= Winter Park =

Winter Park may refer to:

- Winter Park, Colorado
- Winter Park, Florida
- Winter Park Company
- Winter Park cluster housing, Melbourne, Australia
- Winter Park High School, Winter Park, Florida
- Winter Park Resort, Winter Park, Colorado
- Fraser–Winter Park station in Fraser, Colorado
- Winter Park station in Winter Park, Florida
