= Winter Park Resort station =

Train station in Winter Park, Colorado

Winter Park Resort, CO
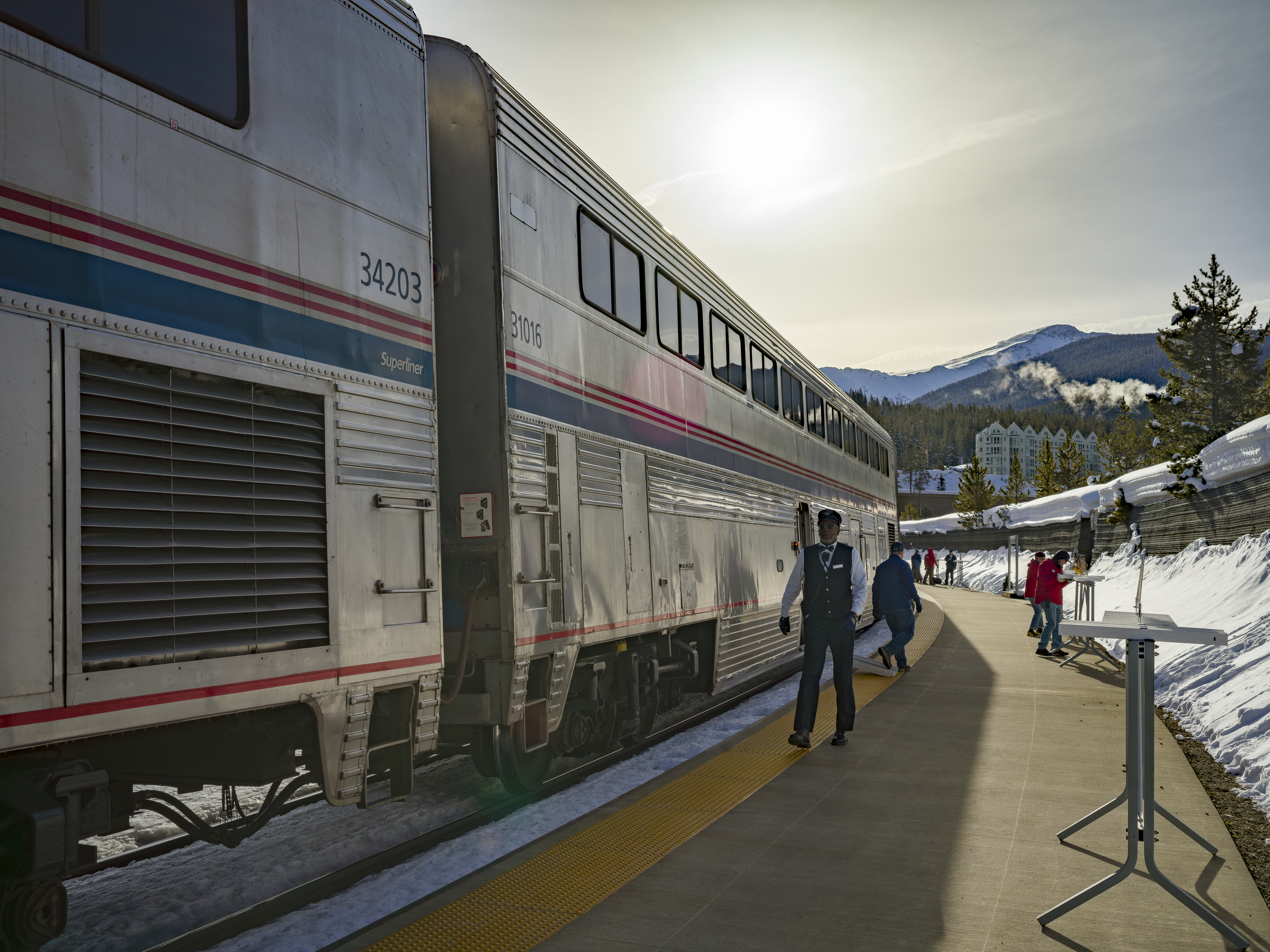
- The Winter Park Express at Winter Park Resort station

General information
- Location: 85 Parsenn Road; Winter Park, Colorado 80402; United States
- Coordinates: 39.887603°N 105.763161°W
- Line: Moffat Tunnel Subdivision
- Platforms: 1 side platform
- Tracks: 2

Construction
- Accessible: yes

Other information
- Station code: Amtrak: WPR

Passengers
- FY 2025: 41,134 (Amtrak)

Services
Preceding station	Amtrak	Following station
Fraser–Winter Park Terminus	Winter Park Express (winter only)	Denver Terminus
California Zephyr does not stop here
Location

Winter Park Resort station is a seasonal train station in Winter Park, Colorado, located at the base of Winter Park Resort just beyond the western portal of the Moffat Tunnel. Amtrak's Winter Park Express serves the single platform five days per week during the winter months with nonstop service to Denver Union Station and nearby Fraser–Winter Park station.
