= Granby station =

American train station in Colorado

Granby, CO
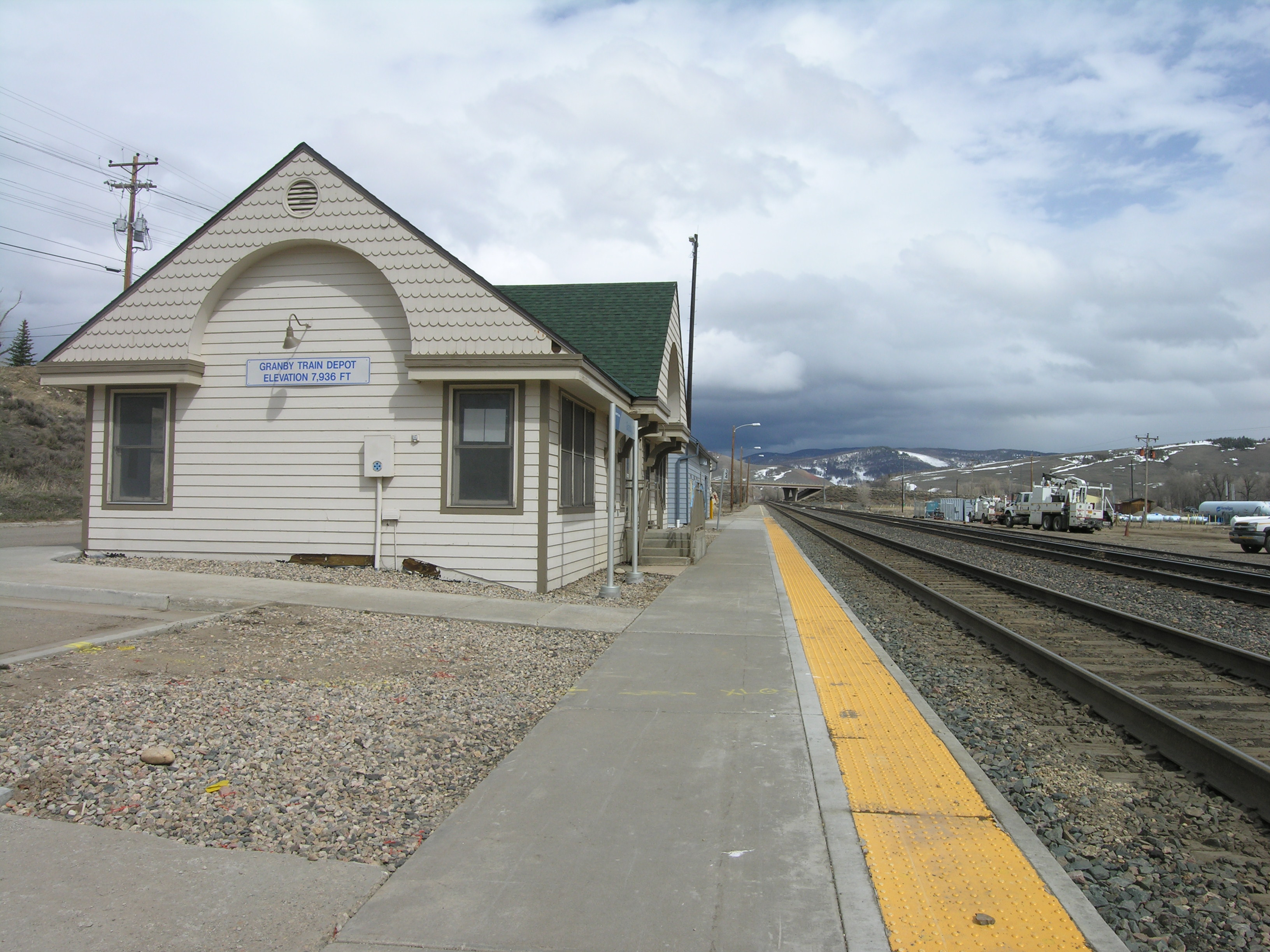
- Granby station.

General information
- Location: 438 Railroad Avenue; Granby, Colorado; United States
- Coordinates: 40.0841°N 105.9355°W
- Owner: Union Pacific Railroad & Town of Granby
- Line: Moffat Tunnel Subdivision
- Platforms: 1 side platform
- Tracks: 2

Construction
- Accessible: Yes

Other information
- Station code: Amtrak: GRA

History
- Opened: 1987

Passengers
- FY 2025: 3,682 (Amtrak)

Services
Preceding station	Amtrak	Following station
Glenwood Springs toward Emeryville	California Zephyr	Fraser–Winter Park toward Chicago
Former services
Preceding station	Amtrak	Following station
Glenwood Springs toward Los Angeles	Desert Wind	Fraser–Winter Park toward Chicago
Glenwood Springs toward Seattle	Pioneer Before 1991 reroute	Fraser–Winter Park toward Chicago
Preceding station	Denver and Rio Grande Western Railroad	Following station
Hot Sulphur Springs toward Ogden	Moffat Tunnel Route	Tabermash toward Denver
Location

Granby station is a train station in Granby, Colorado. It is served by Amtrak's California Zephyr, which runs once daily between Chicago and Emeryville, California, in the San Francisco Bay Area. (Note: The westbound train (Route 5) is scheduled to stop in the late morning and the eastbound train (Route 6) in the mid afternoon.) The wood station building was built in 1987.

Avalanche Car Rentals offers rental SUVs that can be booked for pickup at Granby Station, though the vehicles cannot be driven out of Grand County.

Under the Mountain Rail plan, Granby will be the initial terminus of a new state-supported Amtrak route from Denver, with intermediate stops at Fraser and Winter Park Resort. As of August 2026, service is planned to begin in November 2026, with one daily round trip. In the future, service is planned to expand to three daily round trips, with service extending west to Craig in the Yampa Valley.

Granby is proposed as a station for accessing Rocky Mountain National Park by train. However, while the train ride (from the Denver side) provides impressive views, the station itself lies 16 miles (26 km) from the park, without public transportation connections. In June 2026, the transit agency of Winter Park, the Lift, began operating the ROX Gold Line, a free bus route from Granby Amtrak Station to Grand Lake, the western gateway town of Rocky Mountain National Park. From Grand Lake, however, there are no public shuttle buses operating into the park, only a handful of private guided tours. When planning the ROX Gold Line, Grand County Commissioners discussed extending the route to serve the park directly. Instead, it is proposed that the town of Grand Lake operate a separate seasonal shuttle into the park.
