= 1977 NCAA Skiing Championships =

American college skiing competition

Tournament information
- Sport: College skiing
- Location: Winter Park, Colorado
- Dates: March 2–March 5
- Administrator: NCAA
- Host: University of Colorado
- Venue: Winter Park Resort
- Teams: 13

Final positions
- Champions: Colorado (8th title)
- 1st runners-up: Wyoming
- 2nd runners-up: Dartmouth

The 1977 NCAA Skiing Championships were contested in Winter Park, Colorado from March 2–5, 1977 at the 24th annual NCAA-sanctioned ski tournament to determine the individual and team national champions of men's collegiate downhill skiing, cross-country skiing, and ski jumping in the United States.

Five-time defending champions Colorado, coached by Bill Marolt, once again claimed the team national championship, finishing 24.5 points ahead of Wyoming in the standings. This was the eighth title for the Buffaloes.

== Venue ==
1977 NCAA Skiing Championships site

This year's championships were contested at the Winter Park Resort in Winter Park, Colorado.

This was the fourth time Winter Park hosted the championships, previously hosting in 1972, 1959, and 1956.

== Program changes ==
- Two events were discontinued prior to the 1977 championships: men's Nordic and men's alpine skiing.

== Team scoring ==
Rank	Team	Points
1st place, gold medalist(s)	Colorado	179
2nd place, silver medalist(s)	Wyoming	154.5
3rd place, bronze medalist(s)	Dartmouth	96
4	Vermont	94
5	Utah	80
6	Northern Michigan	42
7	Montana State	31.5
8	New Hampshire	24
9	Alaska–Fairbanks	21
10	Johnson State; Montana	12
12	Middlebury	11
13	Williams	2

== See also ==
- List of NCAA skiing programs
