= Denver Union Station =

Train station in Denver, Colorado

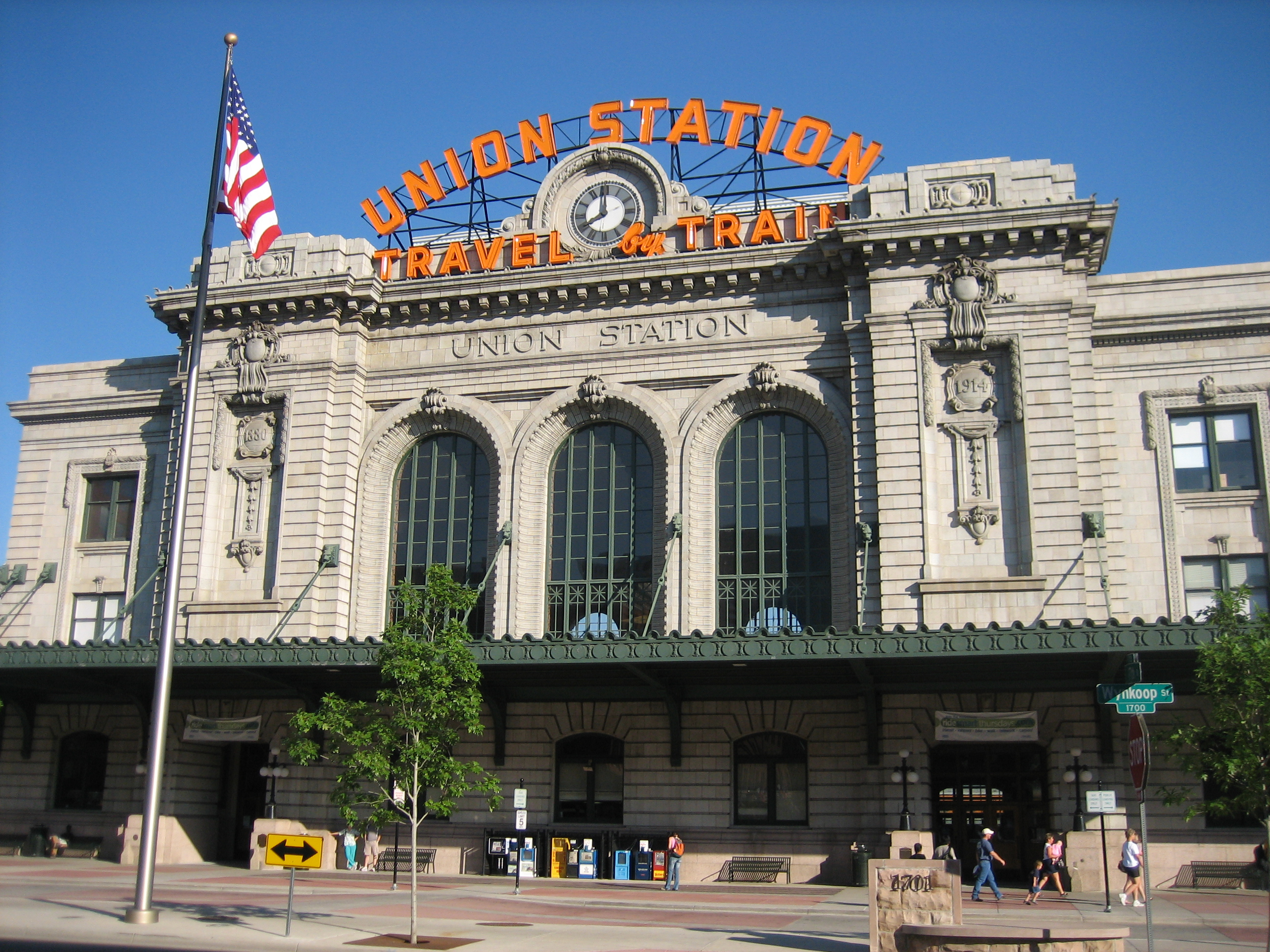
- Front of historic station building

General information
- Location: 1701 Wynkoop Street; Denver, Colorado; United States
- Coordinates: 39°45′11″N 105°00′00″W
- Owner: Regional Transportation District
- Platforms: 2 side platforms, 3 island platforms (Amtrak/commuter rail); 1 side platform, 1 island platform (light rail)
- Tracks: 8 (Amtrak/commuter rail); 2 (light rail)
- Bus stands: 22
- Bus operators: Amtrak Thruway; Bustang; Greyhound Lines
- Connections: RTD Bus: 0, 9, 10, 15, 19, 20, 120X, LD1, LD3, LX2; RTD Flatiron Flyer: FF1, FF2, FF3; RTD MallRide; RTD MetroRide

Construction
- Accessible: Yes

Other information
- Station code: Amtrak: DEN

History
- Opened: May 1881; 145 years ago
- Rebuilt: 1914, 2010–2014

Passengers
- FY 2025: 151,915 annually (Amtrak)
- 2025: 24,326 (average daily) (RTD)
- Rank: 1 of 75

Services
Preceding station	Amtrak	Following station
Fraser–Winter Park toward Emeryville	California Zephyr	Fort Morgan toward Chicago
Winter Park Resort toward Fraser–Winter Park	Winter Park Express (winter only)	Terminus
Preceding station	Rocky Mountaineer	Following station
Glenwood Springs towards Salt Lake City	Canyon Spirit Rockies to the Red Rocks	Terminus
Preceding station	RTD	Following station
41st & Fox toward Westminster	B Line	Terminus
41st & Fox toward Wheat Ridge/Ward	G Line	Terminus
48th & Brighton/National Western Center toward Eastlake/124th	N Line	Terminus
Terminus	A Line	38th & Blake toward Denver Airport
Terminus	C Line	Ball Arena–Elitch Gardens toward Littleton–Mineral
Terminus	E Line	Ball Arena–Elitch Gardens toward RidgeGate Parkway
Terminus	W Line	Ball Arena–Elitch Gardens toward JeffCo Gov't Cntr•Golden
Terminus	Flatiron Flyer	US 36 & Sheridan toward Boulder Junction or Downtown Boulder
Former services
Preceding station	Rocky Mountaineer	Following station
Glenwood Springs towards Moab	Rockies to the Red Rocks	Terminus
Preceding station	Amtrak	Following station
Fraser–Winter Park toward Los Angeles	Desert Wind Discontinued in 1997	Fort Morgan toward Chicago
Fraser–Winter Park 1977-1991 toward Seattle	Pioneer Discontinued in 1997	Fort Morgan toward Chicago
Greeley 1991-1997 toward Seattle	Pioneer Discontinued in 1997	Fort Morgan toward Chicago
Preceding station	Atchison, Topeka and Santa Fe Railway	Following station
Terminus	Denver Branch	South Denver toward La Junta
Terminus	Denver Branch (major stations)	Colorado Springs toward La Junta
Preceding station	Burlington Route	Following station
Terminus	Main Line	Derby toward Chicago
Terminus	Denver – Teague	Littleton toward Teague
through to Oakland via Rio Grande Main Line	California Zephyr	Hastings toward Chicago
Westminster toward Wendover	Wendover – Denver (Colorado and Southern Railway)	Terminus
Preceding station	Chicago, Rock Island and Pacific Railroad	Following station
Terminus	Main Line Via Union Pacific Railroad	Limon toward Chicago
Preceding station	Denver and Rio Grande Western Railroad	Following station
Fraser toward Ogden	Moffat Tunnel Route	Terminus
Glenwood Springs toward Oakland	California Zephyr	through to Chicago via Burlington Route
Littleton toward Ogden	Royal Gorge Route	Terminus
Preceding station	Union Pacific Railroad	Following station
Terminus	Kansas Pacific Railway	Kiowa toward Kansas City
Henderson toward Cheyenne	Cheyenne – Denver	Terminus
St. Vrains toward Boulder	Boulder – Denver	Terminus
Future services
Preceding station	Amtrak	Following station
Winter Park Resort toward Craig	Mountain Rail	Terminus
Terminus	Colorado Connector Opening 2029	Westminster toward Fort Collins
Littleton toward Pueblo	Colorado Connector Phase II Opening 2032	Westminster toward Fort Collins
Empower Field at Mile High Special events only toward Pueblo	Colorado Connector Phase II Opening 2032	Westminster toward Fort Collins
- Union Station
- U.S. National Register of Historic Places
- Colorado State Register of Historic Properties
- Location: 17th St. at Wynkoop, Denver, Colorado
- Area: 25.1 acres (10.2 ha)
- Built: 1881
- Architects: Taylor, A.; Fairfield & Burton
- Architectural style: Beaux-Arts, Classical Revival, Romanesque Revival
- NRHP reference No.: 74000571
- CSRHP No.: 5DV.114
- Added to NRHP: November 20, 1974
Location

Denver Union Station is the main railway station and central transportation hub in Denver, Colorado. It is located at 17th and Wynkoop Streets in the present-day LoDo district and includes the historic station house, a modern open-air train shed, a 22-gate underground bus station, and light rail station. A station was first opened on the site on June 1, 1881, but burned down in 1894. The current structure was erected in two stages, with an enlarged central portion completed in 1914.

In 2012, the station underwent a major renovation transforming it into the centerpiece of a new transit-oriented mixed-use development built on the site's former railyards. The historic station house reopened in the summer of 2014, hosting the 112-room Crawford Hotel, restaurants and retailers.

== History ==
=== 19th century: Original structures ===
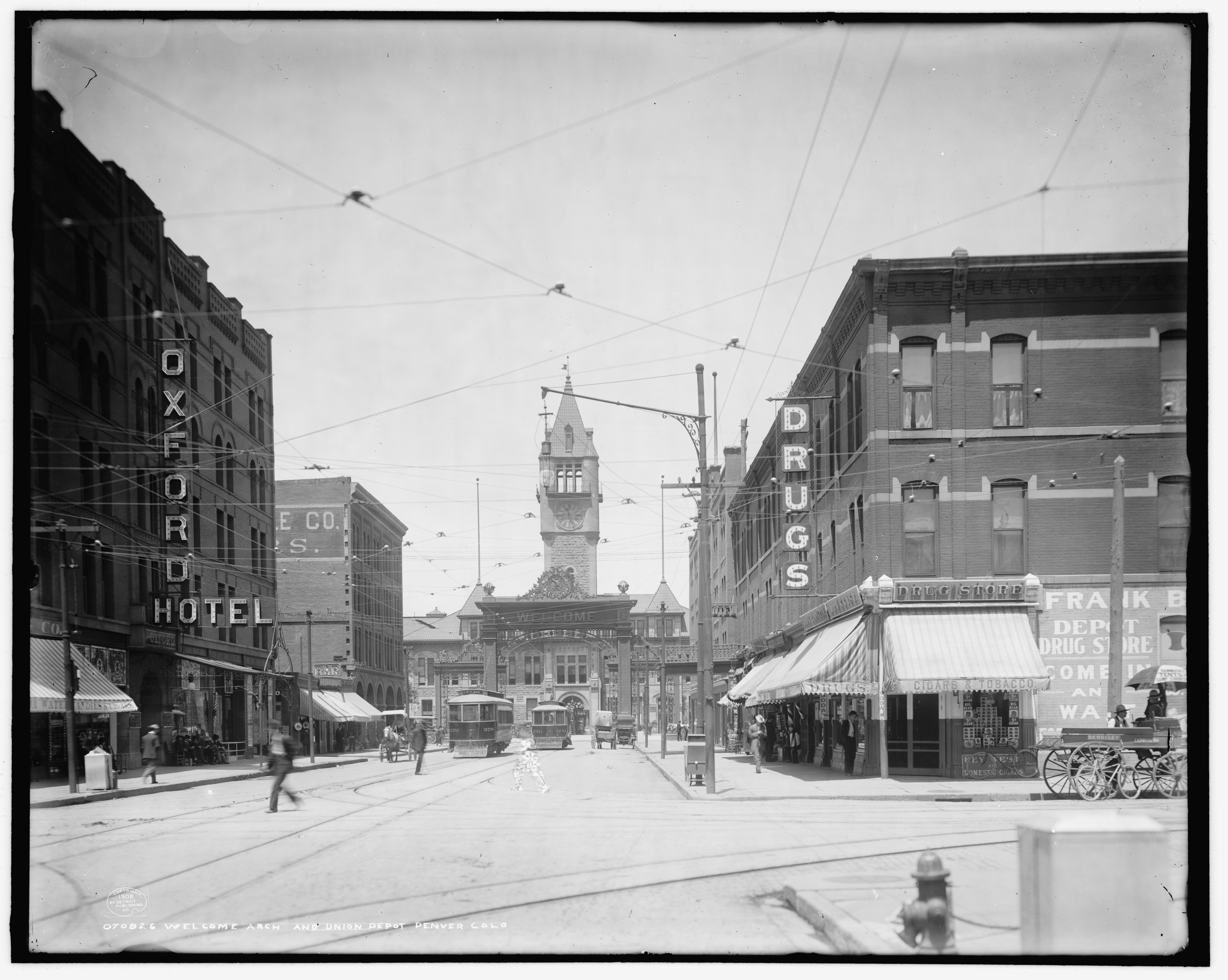
Looking down 17th Street towards the second Union Station building and the Mizpah Arch, c. 1908

Denver's first train station was constructed in 1868 to serve the new Denver Pacific Railway, which connected Denver to the main transcontinental line at Cheyenne, Wyoming. By 1875, there were four different railroad stations, making passenger transfers between different railroad lines inconvenient. To remedy this issue, the Union Pacific Railroad Company proposed creating one central "Union Station" to combine the various operations. In February 1880, the owners of the four lines (the Union Pacific, the Denver & Rio Grande, the Denver, South Park & Pacific and the Colorado Central railroads) agreed to build a station at 17th and Wynkoop Streets. Architect A. Taylor of Kansas City was hired to develop the plans and the station opened June 1, 1881.

A fire that started in the women's restroom in 1894 destroyed the central portion of the 1881 depot. The Kansas City architectural firm of Van Brunt & Howe was hired to design a larger replacement depot in the Romanesque Revival style. Both the 1881 and 1894 depots included a tall central clock tower with four clock faces.

=== Early 20th century ===
On July 4, 1906, a large arch was dedicated in front of the station in order to provide a symbolic threshold for travelers entering and leaving the city. Constructed at a cost of $22,500 with 70 tons of steel and over 2,000 light bulbs, the arch originally featured the word "Welcome" on both sides. The elevation facing 17th Street was changed to "Mizpah", a Hebrew word expressing an emotional bond between separated people, and used as a farewell to people leaving Denver.

In 1912, the original Union Depot partnership was dissolved and replaced by The Denver Union Terminal Railway Company, representing the then-major operators of the station (the Atchison, Topeka and Santa Fe, Chicago, Burlington and Quincy, Chicago, Rock Island and Pacific, Colorado & Southern, Union Pacific and Denver & Rio Grande Western railroads). The new partnership decided to demolish and rebuild the central portion of the station to handle the increasing passenger traffic. The new central portion, designed by Denver architects Gove & Walsh, was built in the Beaux-Arts style and opened in 1914.

By the 1920s and 1930s, over 80 trains served the station daily with notable dignitaries such as Queen Marie of Romania, Presidents Theodore Roosevelt, William Howard Taft and Franklin Delano Roosevelt arriving to Denver through the station. As a result of growing passenger service, the Mizpah Arch in front of the station was deemed a traffic hazard and was torn down in 1931.

=== Late 20th century: Decline ===
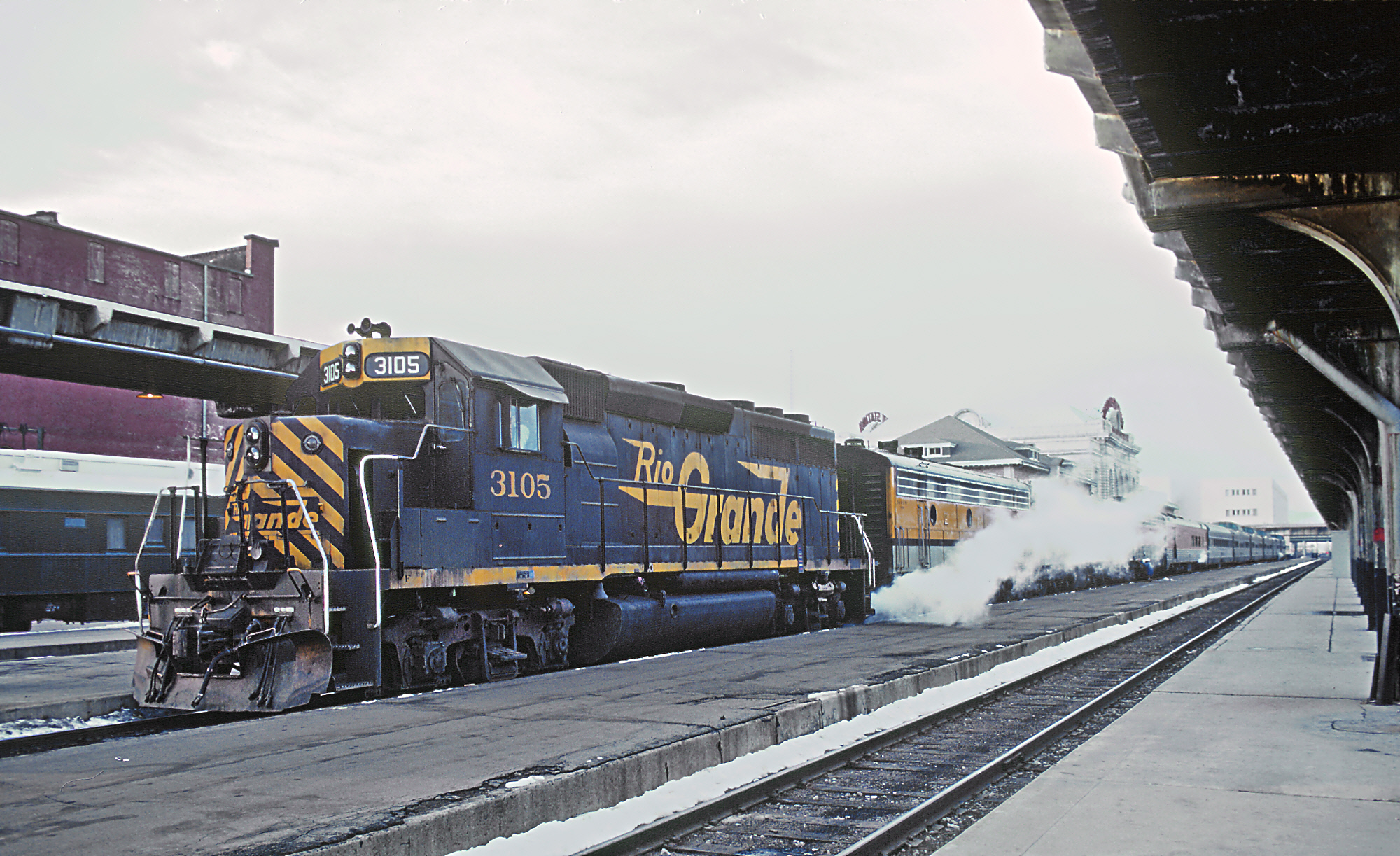
The Rio Grande Zephyr at Union Station, 1980

Although World War II saw a surge in rail traffic, the latter half of the 20th century saw a sharp decline in service for Union Station and countless other train stations in the United States as competition began to grow from automobiles and airlines.

For the first time in 1958, passenger traffic at Stapleton International Airport exceeded that of Union Station. It was during this period that the orange "Union Station: Travel by Train" signs were placed on both sides of the building to advertise intercity rail travel.

Amtrak eventually became the sole provider of rail service through the station, operating only two trains daily between Chicago and the Bay Area with the California Zephyr. From the 1980s to the early 2000s, RTD, the City and County of Denver, the original site owner The Denver Union Terminal Railway Company, and several other entities made periodic improvements such as accommodating an RTD bus lane to access Market Street Station from I-25 and a light rail connection.

The station also served special trains such as the Denver & Rio Grande Western Railroad's Ski Train, which operated until the end of the winter of 2008–2009; in September 2009, plans were announced to revive the service as a special limited route beginning in December, but this fell through due to insurance problems. The ski train returned for the 2022 ski season with weekend service during the peak ski season.

Until the grand renovation, the station served the annual Cheyenne Frontier Days Train, which runs between Denver and Cheyenne, Wyoming, for the Frontier Days Rodeo event. The popular excursion train was later relocated to a site near the Denver Coliseum, where it continued to operate until being discontinued in 2019.

=== 21st century: Renovations ===
==== Redevelopment ====
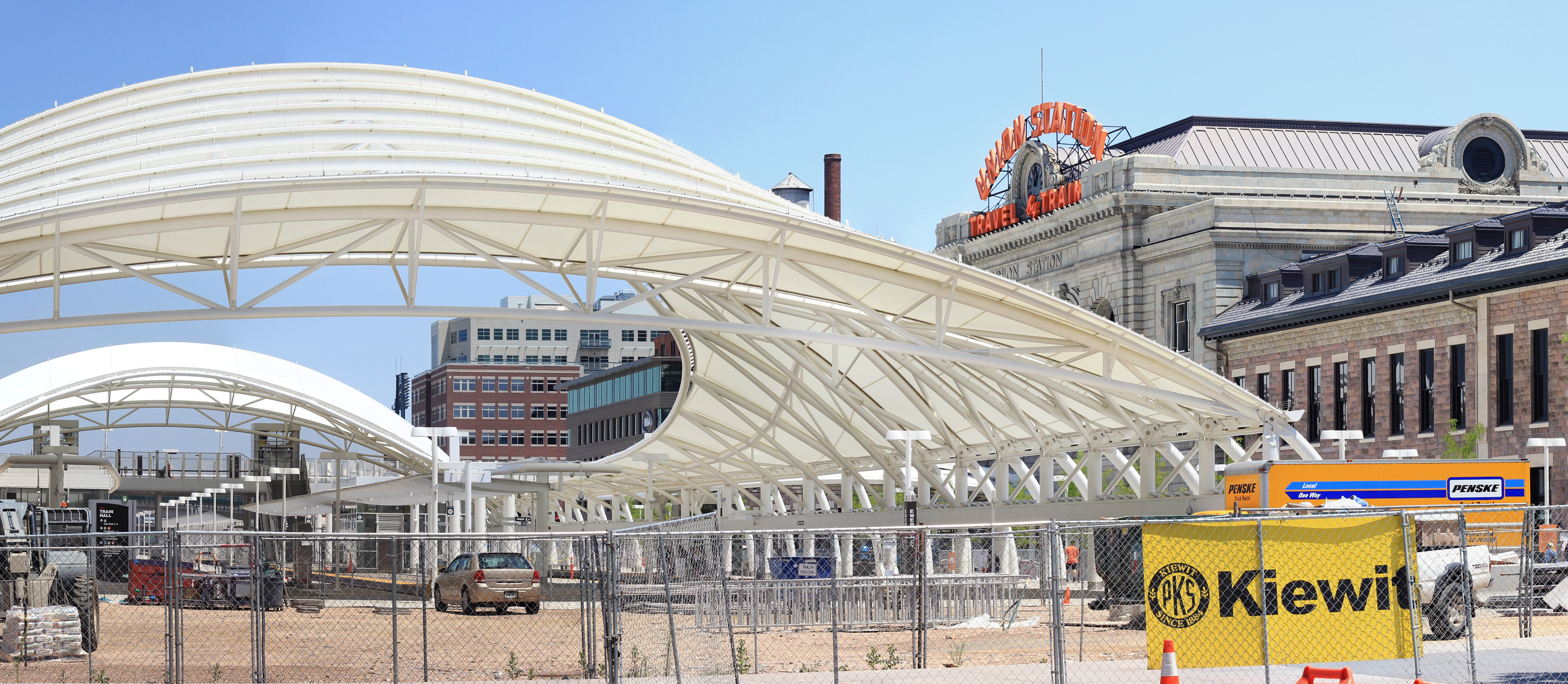
The open air train hall and the historic terminal building, 2014

In 2001, the Regional Transit District (RTD), in partnership with the City of Denver and the State of Colorado bought the station and the 19 acres it sat on. In 2004, the Fast Tracks tax increase passed which provided the funding needed to complete a new regional commuter station at site. In 2009, construction began on the new rail platforms pursuant to a masterplan led by a local development team of Continuum Partners and East West Partners. In 2012, construction began on a major renovation of the historic building transforming it into the centerpiece of a new transit-oriented mixed-use development built on the site's former railyards. The historic station house reopened in the summer of 2014, hosting the 112-room Crawford Hotel, restaurants and retailers.

After a competition in 2006, the Partner Agencies selected a joint venture of Continuum Partners and East West Partners to be "the master developers" of the entire site. Its plan called for the transit elements connected to Union Station in the master plan to be constructed in one single phase at an estimated cost of $500 million. In 2008, Hargreaves Associates and Skidmore, Owings & Merrill were selected to design the public spaces including the landscape, train hall, bus terminal, and light rail station. The project received a $300 million grant from the United States Department of Transportation on July 30, 2010, to help fund construction of three light-rail tracks and eight heavy-rail tracks for both Amtrak and commuter rail services, as well as additional storage and servicing capabilities.

As construction at the site commenced in 2010, Amtrak's passenger station and boarding platform were moved on February 1, 2011, to a temporary site at 21st and Wewatta streets, behind Coors Field. The new light rail station was the first component of the project to open on August 15, 2011, two blocks west of the former light rail stations and adjacent to the consolidated main line railroad tracks near the Denver Millennium Bridge. The westernmost stop of the 16th Street MallRide shuttle, was also moved west adjacent to the new light rail stop.

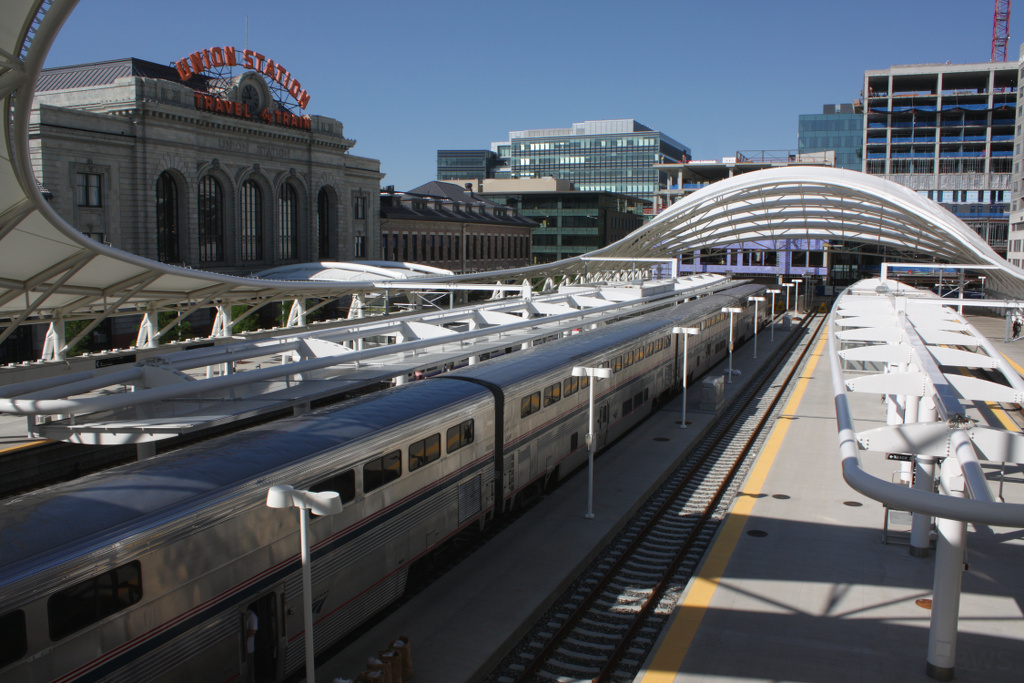
Amtrak California Zephyr at the new train hall, 2016

Amtrak trains started serving the new open air train hall on February 28, 2014, while the new underground 22-gate Bus Concourse opened on May 11, 2014. The new bus concourse replaced Market Street Station at 16th St. & Market St., which closed permanently after thirty years of use as a hub for RTD buses. Bustang served Union Station Bus Concourse since its launch in 2015. In 2020, Greyhound Lines moved their Denver station from a terminal on 19th Street to the Union Station Bus Concourse. Other intercity bus lines at the Bus Concourse are Burlington Trailways and Express Arrow.

Commuter rail service at the new train hall began in April 2016 with the opening of the A Line, offering a connection to Denver International Airport, running every 15 minutes during peak hours with a travel time of approximately 37 minutes. Service between Denver and Westminster began in July 2016 on the first segment of the B Line, which runs every 30 minutes during peak hours. The travel time between the two stations is approximately 11 minutes. Service to Wheat Ridge on the G Line began in April 2019, with an end-to-end travel time of 27 minutes. Service to Thornton on the N Line started in September 2020, with an end-to-end runtime of 29 minutes.

==== Restoration of the historic station house ====
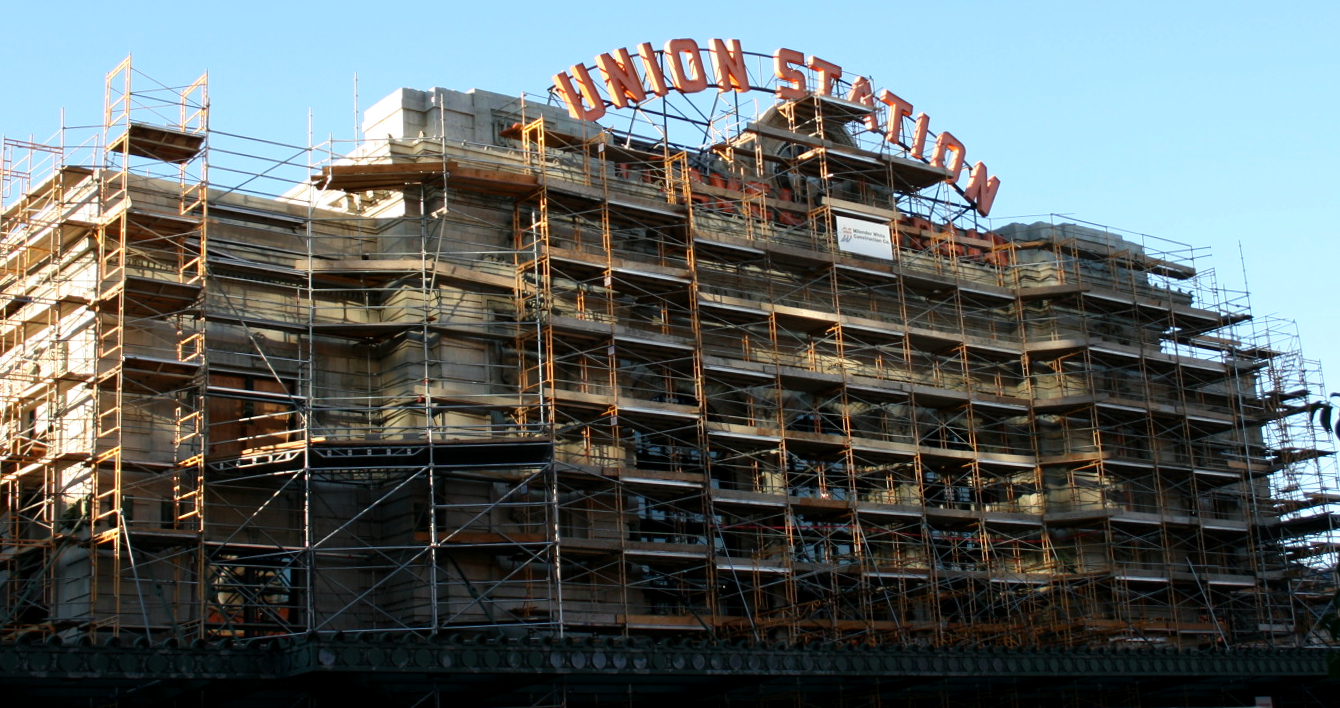
Union Station building during renovations, September 2013

Simultaneous with the construction of its surrounding site, the historic station house also underwent a complete renovation. In 2011, a competition between the Denver Union Station Neighborhood Company and the Union Station Alliance (consisting of local firms Urban Neighborhoods Inc., Sage Hospitality, Larimer Associates, REGen, llc. and McWhinney) created different proposals for the future use of the structure. Both plans called for maintaining a waiting area for transit and spaces for Amtrak, the creation of retail spaces, and integrating the interior spaces with the public plazas facing the station. However, the Denver Union Station Neighborhood plan also envisioned a public market and commercial office space while the Union Station Alliance called for the integration of an independent hotel with an emphasis on creating the Great Hall as "Denver's Living Room".

By 2012, RTD selected the proposal from the Union Station Alliance to renovate the structure as a hotel at a cost of $54 million with retail, public, and transit facilities and approved a 99-year lease for its redevelopment.

The main historic building closed to the public on December 1, 2012, for construction and re-opened July 26, 2014. The majority of the terminal building's upper levels have now become the 112-room Crawford Hotel, with the 12,000 square feet (1,100 m^{2}) Great Hall on the ground level serving as the hotel lobby, public space, and train waiting room and an additional 22,000 square feet (2,000 m^{2}) of the ground level serving as 10 independent retail and restaurant spaces.

==== Future ====
A stop at Union Station has been included in most proposals for Colorado Connector, an under-development inter-city rail service that would connect Pueblo, Colorado Springs, Denver, Boulder, Fort Collins, and Cheyenne. Alternate proposals would have the service bypass Union Station and downtown Denver, instead stopping at Denver Airport station.

== Station layout ==
=== Rail ===
Union Station is aligned northwest to southeast. Tracks 11 and 12 are located approximately 800 feet from Tracks 1-8. Transfers can be made either above ground via the 17th Street promenade or underground via the Bus Concourse.

Tracks 4 and 5 are used by Amtrak. Tracks 1, 2, 7, and 8 are used by RTD commuter rail trains. Commuter rail trains occasionally terminate on tracks 3 and 6 before returning to the yard. Track 12 is used by outbound RTD light rail trains. All inbound light rail trains terminate on Track 11 before short-turning northeast of the station and returning to Track 12. The platforms for Tracks 1-8 are connected on the southwest side of the station, as all are stub tracks.

Track 12	← toward Littleton-Mineral (Ball Arena-Elitch Gardens) ← toward RidgeGate Parkway (Ball Arena-Elitch Gardens) ← toward Jeffco Government Center-Golden (Ball Arena-Elitch Gardens)
Track 12 island platform, doors will open on the left
Track 11	termination track →
Track 11 side platform, alighting passengers only; doors will open on the right
Chestnut Place; 16th Street FreeRide toward Civic Center; escalators to Bus Concourse
17th Street Promenade
Wewatta Street; 19; escalators to Bus Concourse
Tracks 7/8 side platform, doors will open on the right
Track 8	toward Westminster (41st & Fox) →
Track 7	toward Wheat Ridge/Ward (41st & Fox) →
Track 6	← termination track
Track 6 island platform, doors will open on the left
Track 5	California Zephyr toward Emeryville (Fraser-Winter Park) →
Tracks 4/5 island platform, doors will open on the left or right
Track 4	California Zephyr toward Chicago (Fort Morgan) →
Tracks 2/3 island platform, doors will open on the right
Track 3	← termination track
Track 2	toward Eastlake/124th (48th & Brighton/National Western Center) →
Track 1	toward Denver Airport (38th & Blake) →
Track 1 side platform, doors will open on the left
Station house; escalators to Bus Concourse
Wynkoop Street

=== Bus ===
The Union Station Bus Concourse consists of 22 dedicated bus gates. As of 2026, 11 bus gates - B5-B9, B14-B18, and B22 - are used by RTD. Gates B4 and B19 are used by Bustang. Gates B2 and B3 are used by Greyhound Lines. The Greyhound ticket counter is located between the gates. Buses enter the underground concourse via ramps from 18th Street at Wynkoop Street or Chestnut Place.

Escalators to Chestnut Place, 16th Street FreeRide,
B11	Not in regular use	Concourse	Not in regular use	B12
B10	Not in regular use	Concourse	Not in regular use	B13
B9	10 toward Aurora	Concourse	MetroRide toward Civic Center	B14
B8	15 toward Aurora	Concourse	120X toward Thornton	B15
B7	0 toward Englewood	Concourse	LD1 or LD3 or LX2 toward Longmont	B16
B6	20 toward Aurora	Concourse	FF1 Local toward Boulder	B17
B5	9 toward Lakewood	Concourse	FF2 or FF3 Express toward Boulder	B18
Escalators to Wewatta Street; 19,
B4	Bustang North toward Fort Collins or South toward Colorado Springs	Concourse	Bustang West toward Grand Junction or Outrider toward Craig, Crested Butte, or Sterling	B19
B3	Greyhound	Concourse	Not in regular use	B20
B2	Greyhound	Concourse	Not in regular use	B21
B1	Not in regular use	Concourse	Special use gate (e.g. bus bridges)	B22
Escalators to station house, Wynkoop Street, Amtrak,

== Architecture ==
=== Layout ===
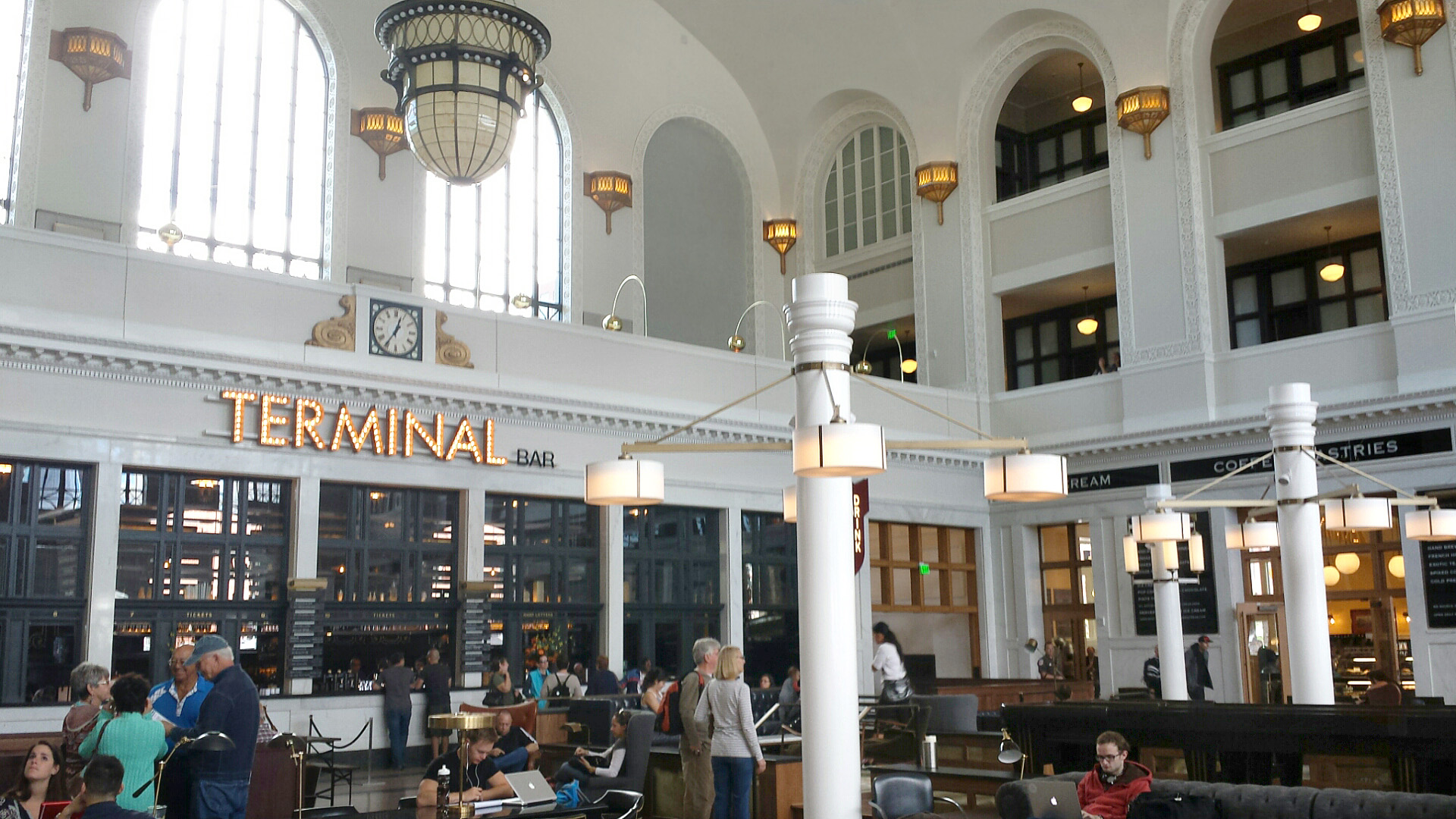
Interior view of the renovated Great Hall

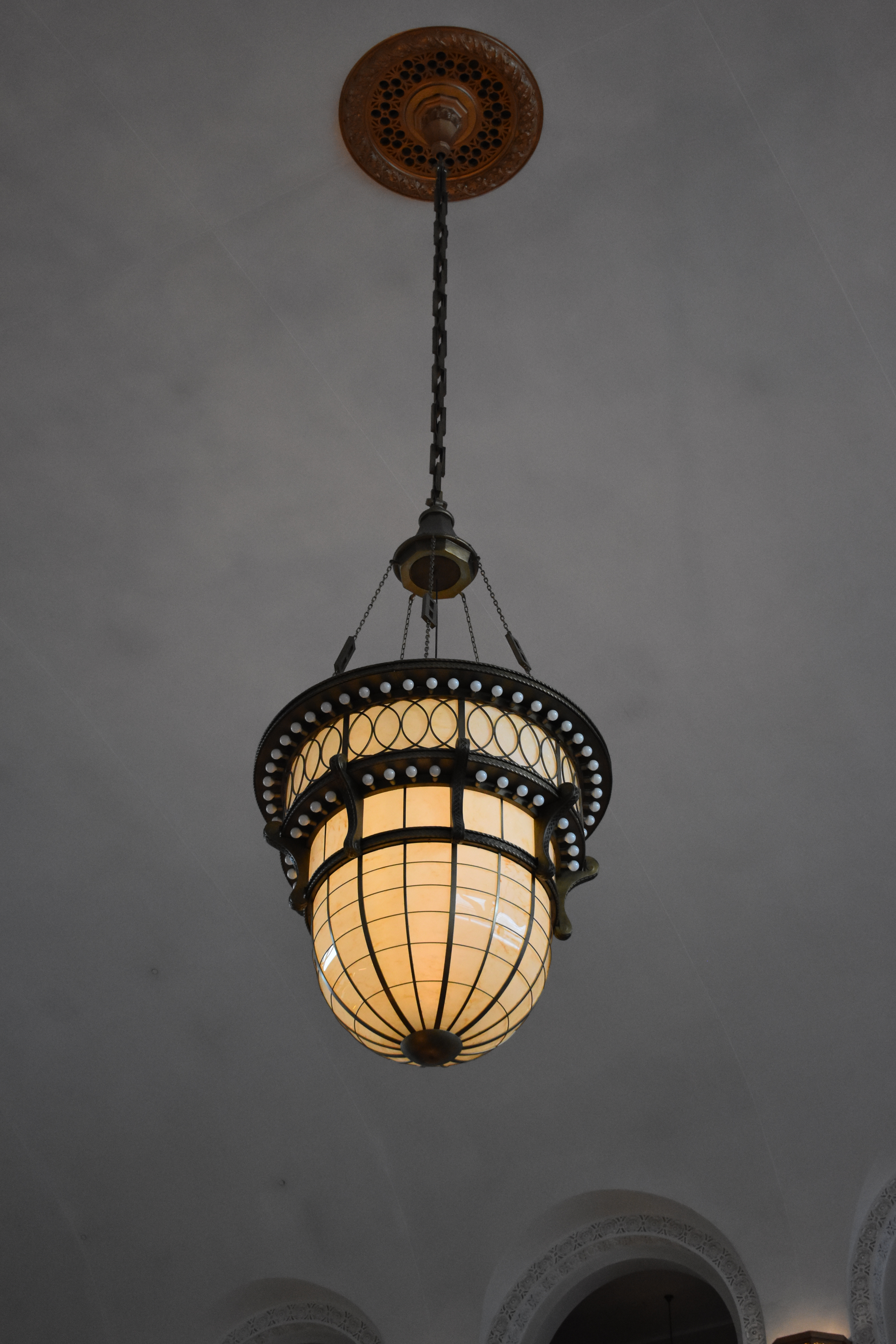
Lighting fixture inside the Great Hall

As an inter-modal transportation hub, Denver Union Station consists of the historic terminal building and, on the site's former rail yards, an open-air train hall, a 22-gate underground bus terminal, and a light rail station. The train hall stands immediately behind the historic building and houses tracks for Amtrak and the commuter rail lines. An entrance between the train hall and the historic building lead directly to the underground bus terminal, which stretches west for two city blocks along 17th Street until it terminates at an above-ground light rail station. Street-level pavilions at the light rail stop/Chestnut Place, Wewatta Street and at each platform in the train hall provide additional vertical circulation to the bus terminal.

Each of these transportation elements are tied together above ground by major public spaces and landscape elements such as the 17 St. Promenade/Gardens, Wynkoop Plaza and several other public plazas.

Historically, a subterranean passage accessed through the northern wing building connected the station to the old rail platforms above. However, the passage and its entrance was demolished with the construction of the bus terminal.

=== Historic building ===
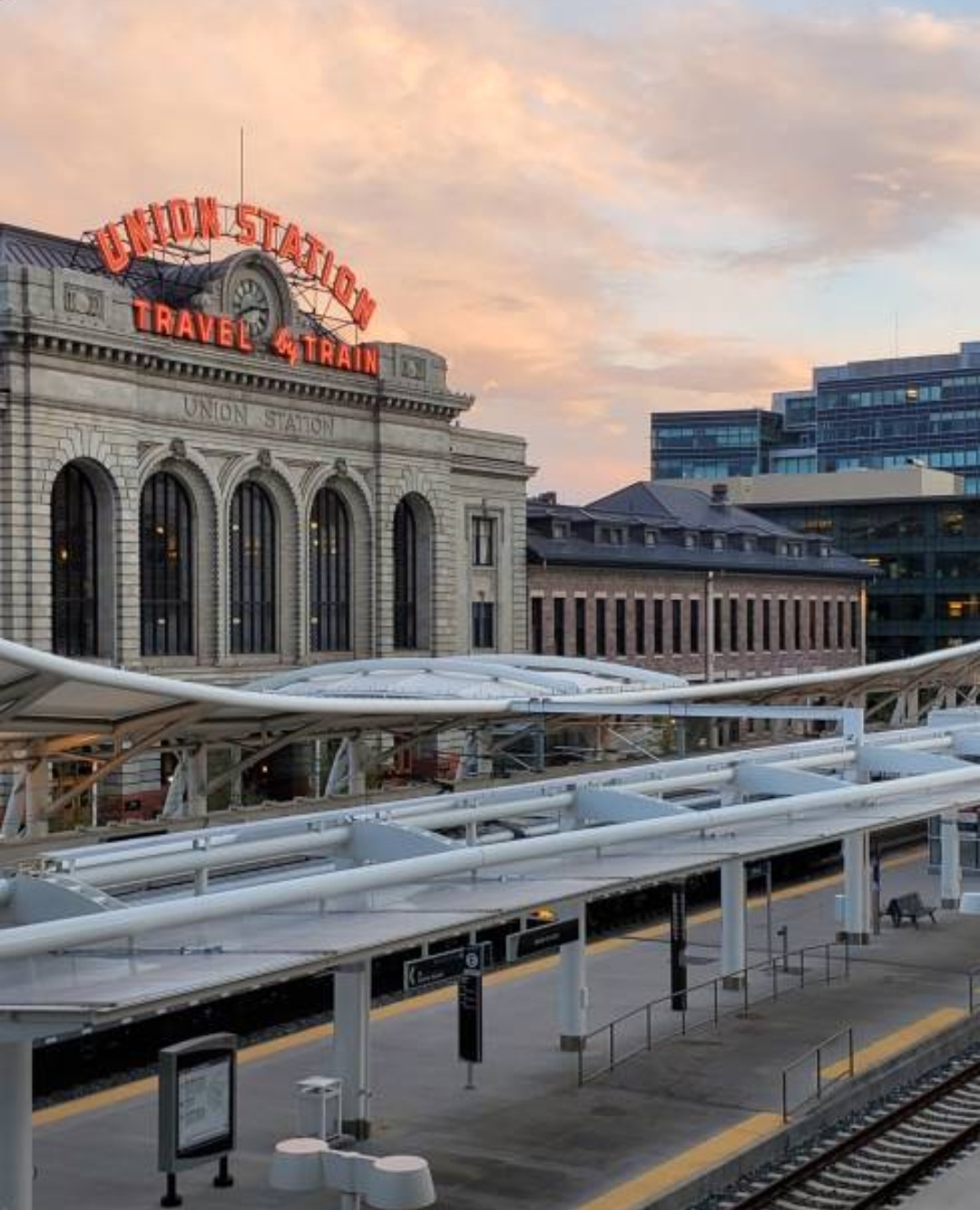
Union Station in 2023

The present-day Union Station building consists mainly of two lower wing buildings flanking a larger central mass built during different parts of the station's history. The wing buildings were built with the first 1881 structure in a Romanesque Revival style, featuring tall, narrow windows, rusticated stonework and motifs of Colorado's state flower, the columbine. When the station was gutted by the 1894 fire, the facades of the wing buildings were incorporated into the 1894 depot and the 1914 renovation. They originally functioned as offices and other facilities for the station through its history, although today the structures house guestrooms for the Crawford Hotel and several restaurants.

When originally constructed, the Great Hall also included three large chandeliers and ten long wooden benches that incorporated heating and lighting into their framework. While the renovation saw the return of similar chandeliers as the originals, it also saw the removal of the benches due to asbestos. Other modifications made during 2012 included changing the brown and tan color scheme of the interior to a more neutral white. The old ticket counters and offices were also converted into the Terminal Bar along with several retail and restaurant spaces being created on the periphery of and opening on to the Great Hall. In general, the 2012 renovation sought to create "Denver's Living Room" in the Great Hall by diversifying its functions. It functions today as part hotel lobby, part Amtrak, part waiting area, part retail, and part public space.
