= Glenwood Springs station =

Railway station in Colorado, United States

Glenwood Springs, CO
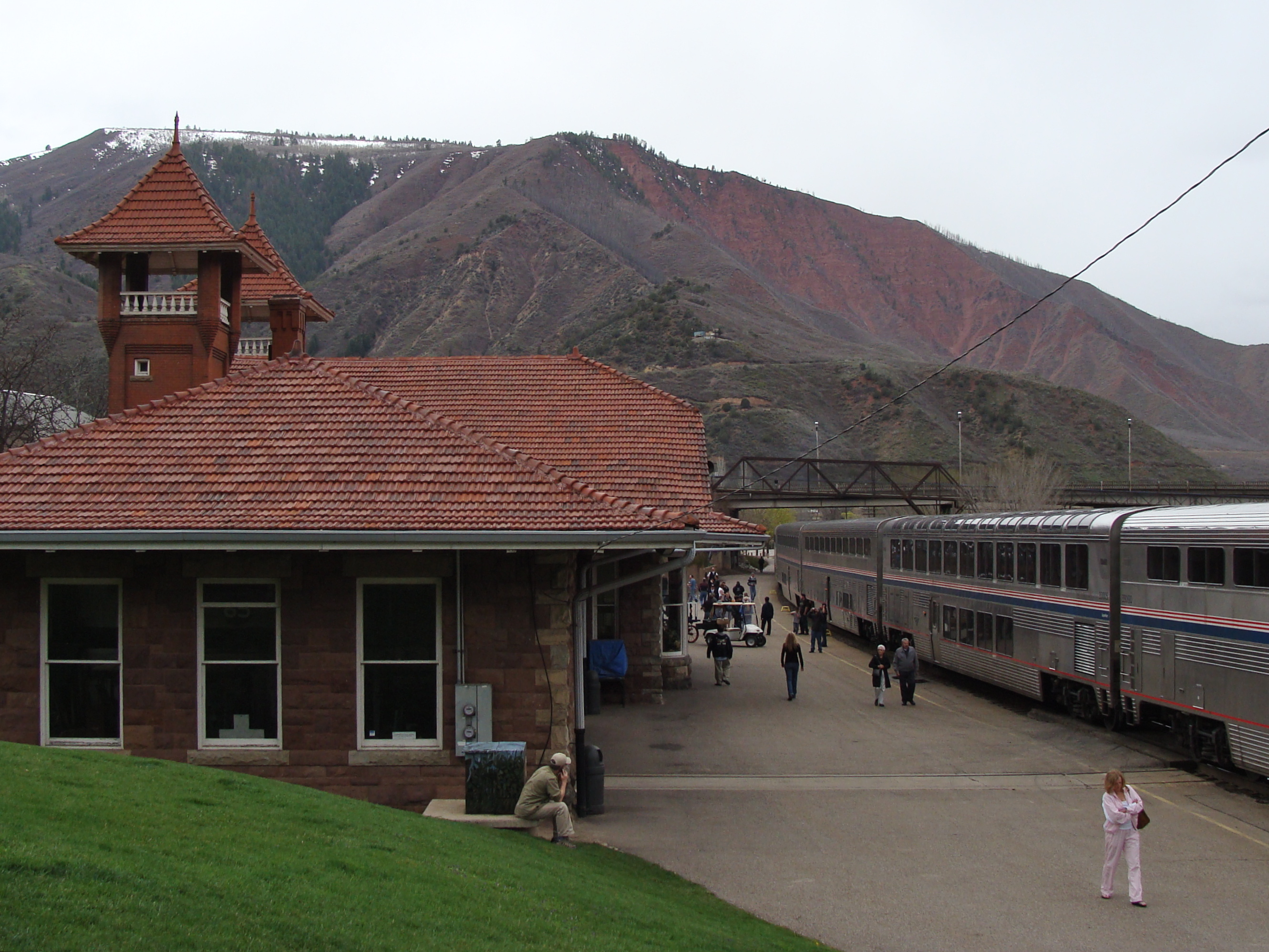

General information
- Location: 413 7th Street; Glenwood Springs, Colorado; United States
- Coordinates: 39°32′53″N 107°19′23″W
- Owner: Union Pacific Railroad Company
- Line: Glenwood Springs Subdivision
- Platforms: 1 side platform
- Tracks: 2

Construction
- Parking: Long and short term
- Accessible: Yes
- Architectural style: Romanesque Revival

Other information
- Station code: Amtrak: GSC

History
- Opened: 1904

Passengers
- FY 2025: 42,841 (Amtrak)

Services
Preceding station	Amtrak	Following station
Grand Junction toward Emeryville	California Zephyr	Granby toward Chicago
Preceding station	Rocky Mountaineer	Following station
Moab towards Salt Lake City	Canyon Spirit Rockies to the Red Rocks	Denver Terminus
Former services
Preceding station	Amtrak	Following station
Grand Junction toward Los Angeles	Desert Wind	Granby toward Chicago
Grand Junction toward Seattle	Pioneer Before 1991 reroute	Granby toward Chicago
Preceding station	Denver and Rio Grande Western Railroad	Following station
Rifle toward Ogden	Moffat Tunnel Route	Dotsero toward Denver
Rifle toward Ogden	Royal Gorge Route	Dotsero toward Denver
Grand Junction toward Oakland	California Zephyr	Denver toward Chicago
Preceding station	Rocky Mountaineer	Following station
Moab Terminus	Rockies to the Red Rocks	Denver Terminus
Location

The Glenwood Springs station is a railway station in Glenwood Springs, Colorado. It is served by the Amtrak California Zephyr, which runs between Chicago and Emeryville, California, in the San Francisco Bay Area and is an overnight stop on Canyon Spirit's Rockies To Red Rocks luxury train service between Denver, Colorado and Moab, Utah.

The Glenwood Springs station was originally built by the Denver & Rio Grande Western Railroad Company (D&RGW) in 1904, and sits close to the southern bank of the Colorado River. The station is composed of brick and Frying Pan River red sandstone, while the roof line is done in a jerkinhead, or half-hip roof style. The entrance is flanked by medieval-inspired brick towers with pyramidal roofs. The Glenwood Railroad Museum occupies the former Ladies' Waiting Room.

The station also serves as one of two Greyhound bus stops in Glenwood Springs. However, The Roaring Fork Transportation Authority city bus does not stop here.

On June 7, 1977, Amtrak introduced the Pioneer, with service between Chicago and Seattle. On October 28, 1979, Amtrak initiated the Desert Wind service between Chicago and Los Angeles. Both trains serviced Glenwood Springs. In 1991, the Pioneer was rerouted through Wyoming, and no longer stopped in Glenwood Springs. Both the Desert Wind and the Pioneer were discontinued on May 10, 1997. The California Zephyr entered service on April 24, 1983, and services Glenwood Springs to this day.

According to the Amtrak Fact Sheet (Colorado), Fiscal Year 2019, Glenwood Springs was the second busiest of the nine Colorado stations served by Amtrak.

The station and the town feature in an episode of the BBC television series Around the World in 80 Days with Michael Palin.

On August 15, 2021, luxury tourist railroad Rocky Mountaineer began using the station as an overnight stop for its Rockies to Red Rocks service.. This service is being rebranded as the "Canyon Spirit" starting in 2026.
