= Fraser–Winter Park station =

Intercity rail station in Fraser, Colorado

Fraser–Winter Park, CO
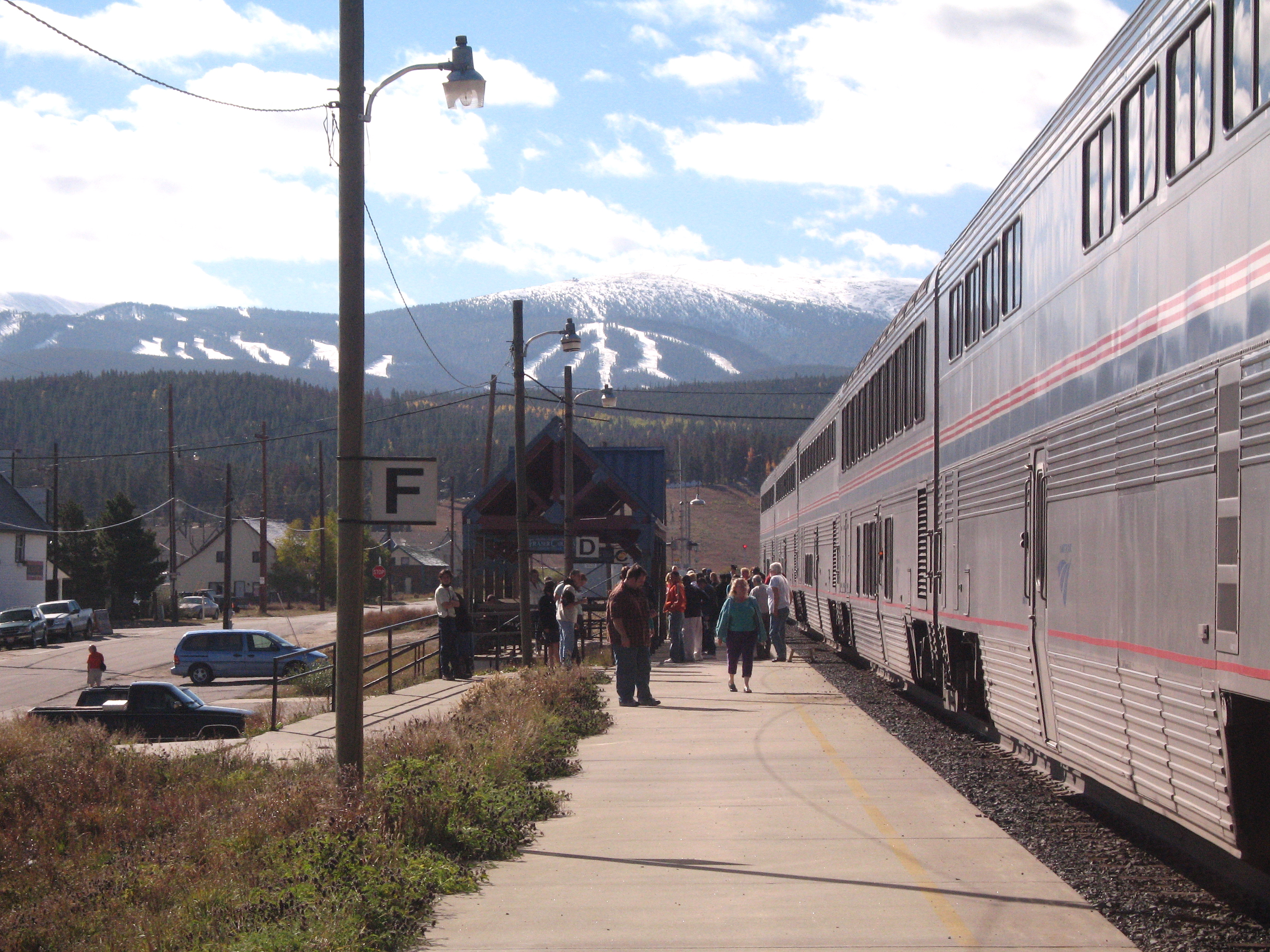
- Fraser–Winter Park Amtrak station.

General information
- Location: 205 Fraser Avenue; Fraser, Colorado; United States
- Coordinates: 39.9476°N 105.8175°W
- Owner: Ronald M. Anderson
- Line: Moffat Tunnel Subdivision
- Platforms: 1 side platform
- Tracks: 2

Construction
- Accessible: yes

Other information
- Station code: Amtrak: WIP

History
- Opened: January 17, 1985

Passengers
- FY 2025: 12,525 (Amtrak)

Services
Preceding station	Amtrak	Following station
Granby toward Emeryville	California Zephyr	Denver toward Chicago
Terminus	Winter Park Express (winter only)	Winter Park Resort toward Denver
Former services
Preceding station	Amtrak	Following station
Granby toward Los Angeles	Desert Wind Discontinued in 1997	Denver toward Chicago
Granby toward Seattle	Pioneer Before 1991 reroute	Denver toward Chicago
Preceding station	Denver and Rio Grande Western Railroad	Following station
Sulphur toward Ogden	Moffat Tunnel Route	Denver Terminus
Location

Fraser–Winter Park station is a train station in Fraser, Colorado. It is served by Amtrak's California Zephyr, which runs once daily in each direction between Chicago and Emeryville, California, in the San Francisco Bay Area. Since December 2024, the station has also been served by the Winter Park Express during the winter months.

The station house is unstaffed, except during winter. At 8,561 feet (2,609 m) above sea level, it is Amtrak's highest-elevation train station.
