= Winter Park Resort =

Ski resort in Colorado, United States

Winter Park

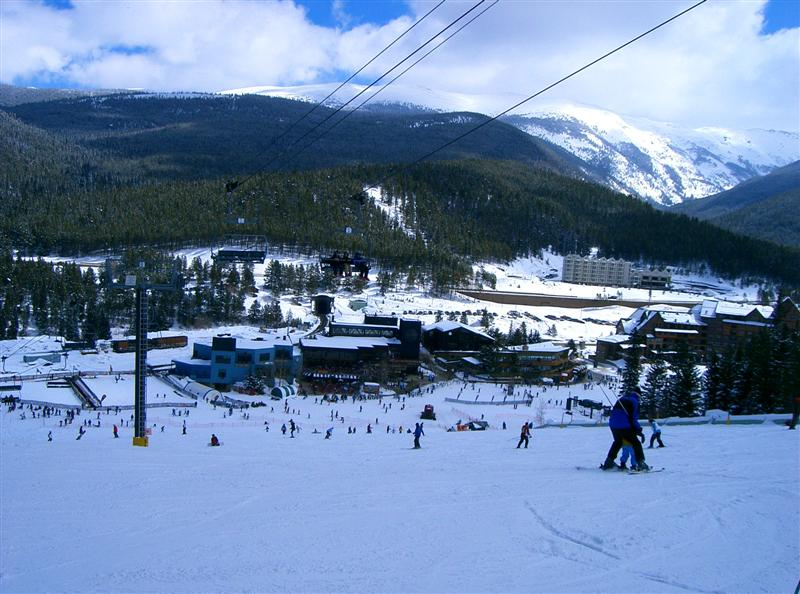
- Winter Park Village in 2006

- Location in the United States Location in Colorado
- Location: Grand County, Colorado, U.S.
- Nearest city: Winter Park, Denver
- Coordinates: 39°53′13″N 105°45′45″W
- Status: Operating
- Owner: City and County of Denver
- Vertical: 3,060 feet (933 m)
- Top elevation: 12,060 feet (3,676 m)
- Base elevation: 9,000 feet (2,743 m)
- Skiable area: 3,081 acres (12.5 km^{2})
- Trails: 167 total 8% beginner 18% intermediate 19% advanced 52% most difficult 3% expert
- Lift system: 23 total: 1 Gondola lift; 9 High-speed chairs; 9 Fixed-grip chairs; 3 Surface lifts; 1 Rope tow
- Snowfall: 370 in (30.8 ft; 9.4 m)
- Website: winterparkresort.com

Winter Park Resort is an alpine ski resort in the western United States, in the Rocky Mountains of Colorado at Winter Park. Located in Grand County just off U.S. Highway 40, the resort is about a ninety-minute drive from Denver.

== History ==
The mountain opened for the 1939–40 season as Winter Park Ski Area and was owned and operated by the city and county of Denver until 2002, when Denver entered into a partnership with Intrawest ULC, a Canadian corporation headquartered in Vancouver, British Columbia, which operated the resort until Intrawest was acquired by Alterra Mountain Company in 2018. For nearly 70 years, a popular way for Denver residents to arrive was via the Ski Train, which arrived at a station the resort's base area through the Moffat Tunnel. Ski Train service ended in 2009 but returned as the Winter Park Express in 2017. Winter Park Resort is home to one of the world's largest and oldest disabled skiing programs, the National Sports Center for the Disabled.

During Intrawest's stint operating the resort, they made several changes to the mountain's infrastructure, renovating the food services in the West Portal base lodge, opening new lifts in 2005 and 2006, and a new base village with hundreds of condominia, a parking structure, a "Village Pond," retail space, and an open-air gondola known as "The Village Cabriolet." The historic 1955 Balcony House was listed as one of Colorado's Most Endangered Places by Colorado Preservation, Inc. This historic building was designed in the Googie style of architecture, which was a popular style in the 1940s to the 1960s.

The resort consists of three interconnected mountain peaks — Winter Park, Mary Jane, and Vasquez Ridge — which share a common lift ticket. Mary Jane, opened in 1975, has a separate base area and is known for its moguls, tree skiing, hidden huts, and generally more difficult terrain. It encompasses the above-tree line terrain of Parsenn Bowl. Vasquez Ridge, opened in 1986, offers intermediate terrain and mogul runs. In 1997, 435 acres (176 ha) of backcountry terrain in Vasquez Cirque were opened to skiing, although access required hiking from the top of Mary Jane; the 2006 relocation of the former Outrigger triple chairlift to the backside of Parsenn Bowl (now called Eagle Wind) provides an easier escape back to Mary Jane after descending Vasquez Cirque.

Beginning with the 2013-14 season, the resort was divided into seven "territories". The three peaks — Winter Park, Mary Jane, and Vasquez Ridge — are each considered their own territories. Parsenn Bowl is now considered its own territory separate from Mary Jane. The remaining three are Vasquez Cirque (the backcountry terrain behind Parsenn Bowl), Eagle Wind (the glade below Vasquez Cirque), and "Terrain Park" (the various terrain parks across the mountain).

Winter Park is a year-round resort; the resort operates the lifts during the summer months for mountain biking, hiking and sightseeing. The Arrow chairlift also services an alpine slide in the summer, and the base area features miniature golf, a climbing wall, and other diversions. While the Winter Park area is also a popular destination for golf, there are no golf courses located at, or operated by, the resort itself. Winter Park boasts the most extensive lift access summer mountain biking trails in Colorado.

In 2018 Winter Park Resort was named "Best ski resort in North America" as voted by the readers of USA Today. In 2019 Winter Park Resort was named "Number 1 Ski Resort in North America".

Winter Park hosted the NCAA Skiing Championships in 1956, 1959, 1972, and 1977. The team title went to Denver in 1956 and Colorado took the latter three.

== Statistics ==
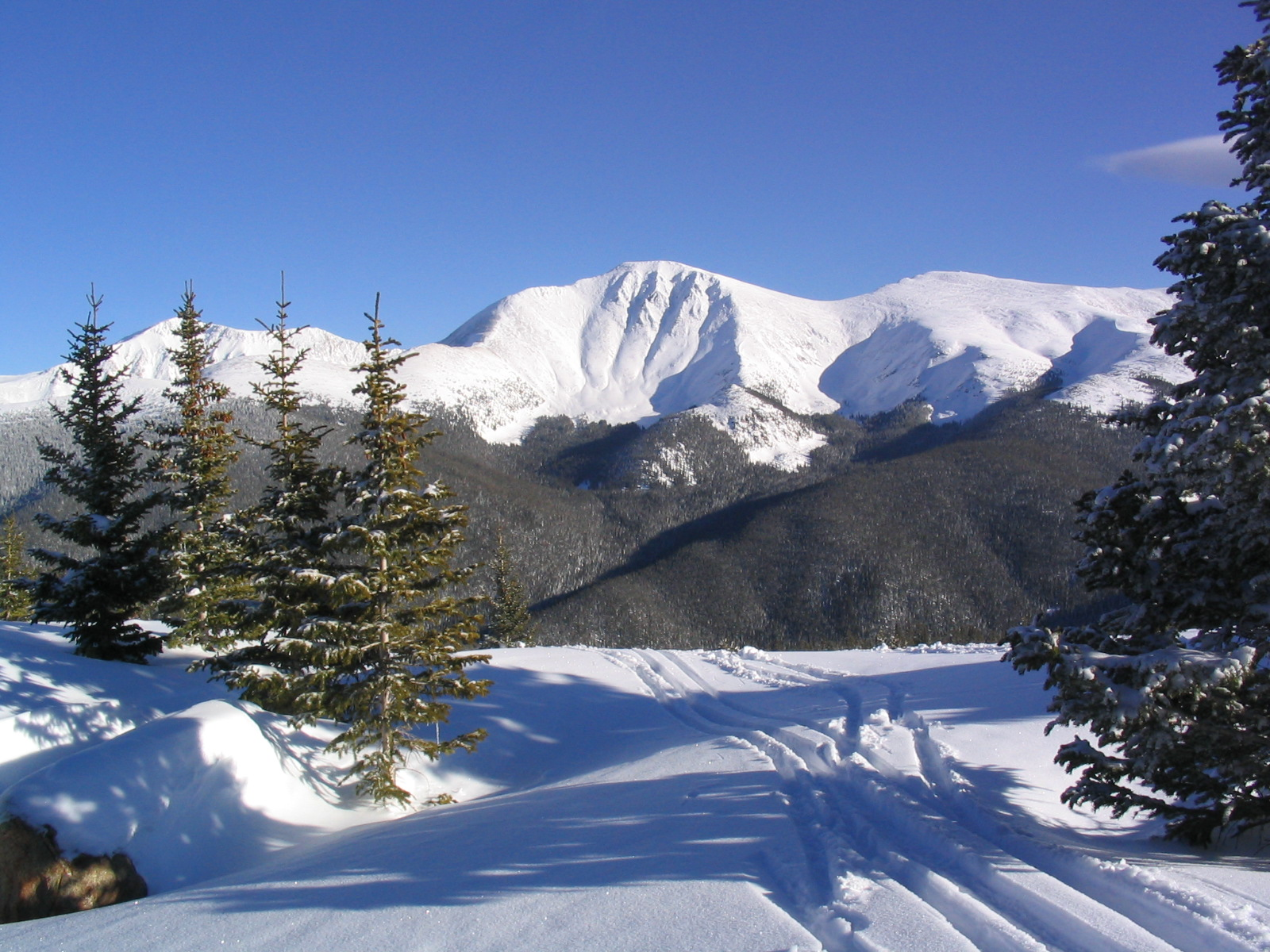
View looking east at Parry Peak from near the top of the Mary Jane.

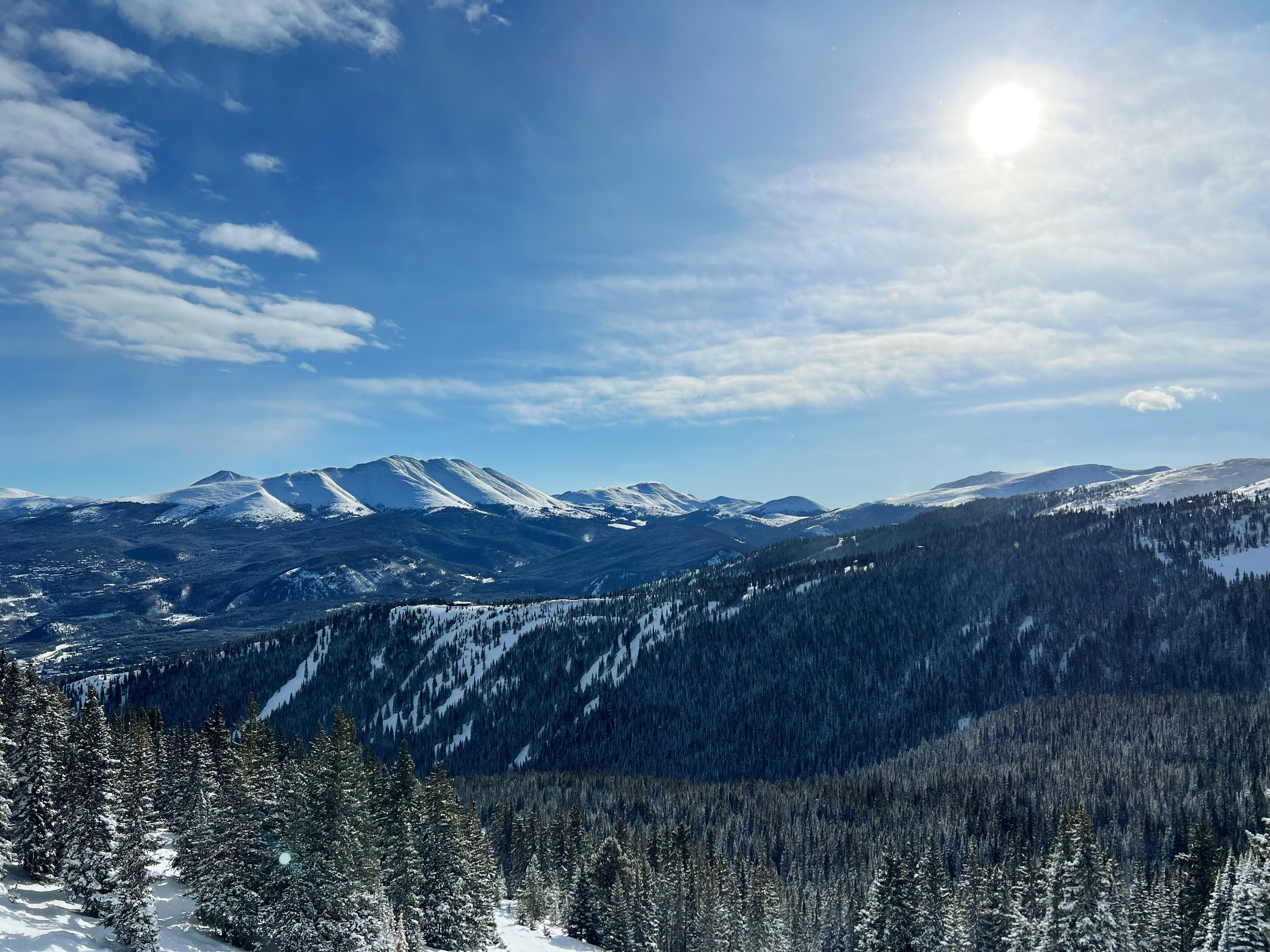
View from Vasquez Ridge

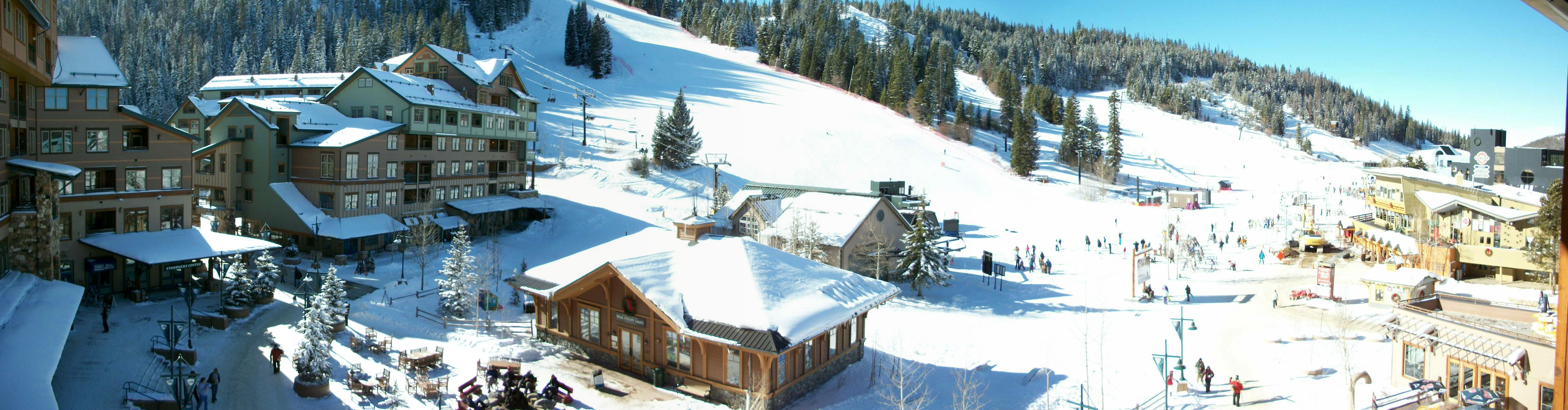
Panoramic view of the Zephyr Express and Zephyr Mountain Lodge.

=== Elevation ===
- Base: 9,000 ft (2,743 m)
- Summit: 12,060 ft (3,676 m)
- Vertical rise: 3,060 ft (933 m)
- Skiable area: 3,081 acres (4.8 mi^{2}; 12.5 km^{2})
- Trails: 166 total (8% beginner, 18% intermediate, 19% advanced, 52% difficult, 3% expert)
- Average annual snowfall: 317.5 inches (26.5 ft; 8.1 m)
- "Territories"
  - Winter Park
  - Vasquez Ridge
  - Parsenn Bowl
  - Terrain Park
  - Mary Jane
  - Eagle Wind
  - The Cirque

=== Slope Aspects ===
- North: 50%
- East: 10%
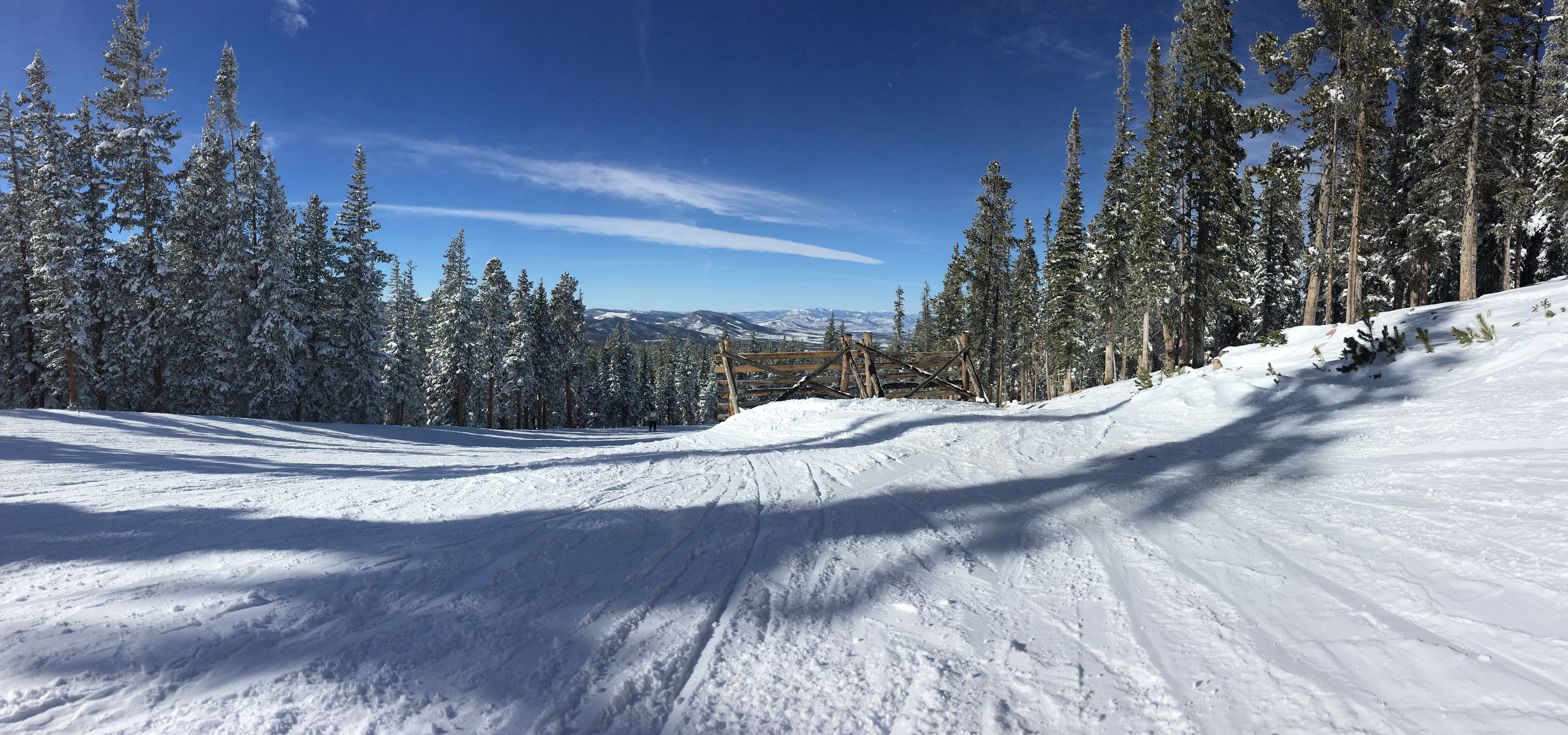
  A panorama taken on Whistlestop run at Winter Park Resort.
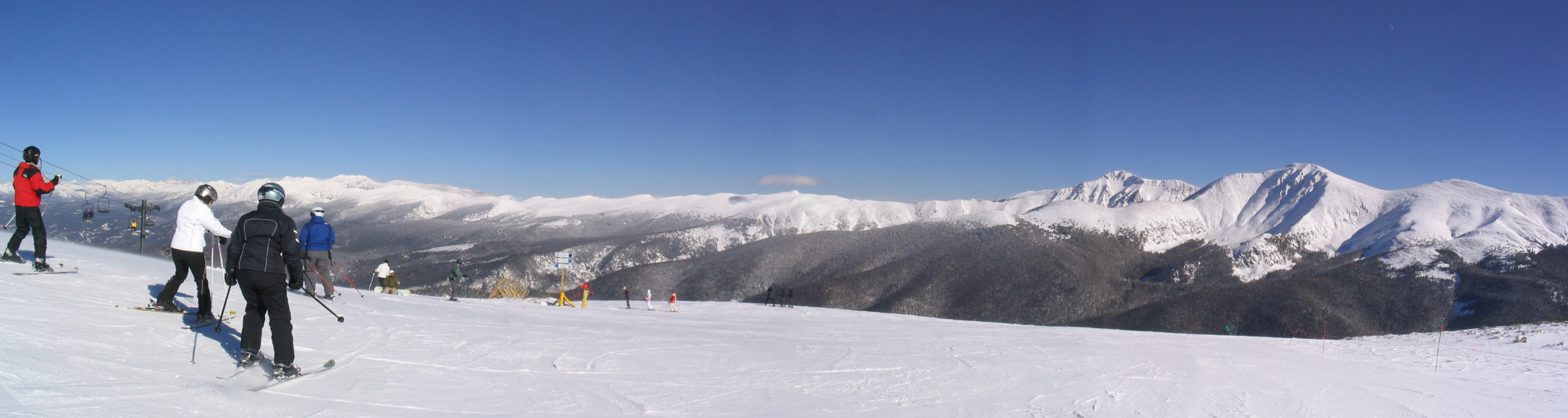
  View looking north from the top of Parsenn Bowl prior to the construction of the Panoramic Express.
- South: 2%
- West: 38%

=== Lifts ===
- Winter Park currently has 23 operating lifts.

Lift Name	Type	Manufacturer	Year built	Territory	Notes
The Gondola	Gondola 10	Leitner-Poma	2018	Winter Park	
Village Cabriolet	Gondola 8	Leitner-Poma	2008	n/a	Does not serve any terrain, used as transportation between Vintage parking lot to Winter Park Village.
Panoramic Express	High speed six pack	Leitner-Poma	2007	Parsenn Bowl	When opened, it was marketed as being the highest high-speed six pack in North America, a title it retained until the Kensho SuperChair at Breckenridge Ski Resort was built in 2013.
Super Gauge Express	High speed six pack	Leitner-Poma	2005	Mary Jane	
Sunnyside Express	High speed six pack	Leitner-Poma	2019	Mary Jane	
Explorer Express	High speed quad	Poma	1999	Winter Park	Formerly called the Eskimo Express from 1999 to 2020
Gemini Express	High speed quad	Poma	1993	Winter Park	
High Lonesome Express	High speed quad	Poma	1991	Mary Jane	
Olympia Express	High speed quad	Poma	1996	Winter Park	
Wild Spur Express	High speed six pack	Leitner-Poma	2023	Vasquez Ridge	Contains a midway load station for skiers lapping the ridge, eliminating a lengthy traverse back to the base of the lift
Prospector Express	High speed quad	Poma	1994	Winter Park	
Arrow	Triple	Yan	1979	Winter Park	
Eagle Wind	Triple	Yan	2006	Eagle Wind	Former Outrigger chair from 1978-2003
Endeavour	Triple	Poma	1993	Winter Park	
Challenger	Double	Heron-Poma	1974	Mary Jane	
Discovery	Double	Heron-Poma	1984	Winter Park	
Galloping Goose	Double	Heron-Poma	1974	Mary Jane	
Iron Horse	Double	Heron-Poma	1974	Mary Jane	
Looking Glass	Double	Riblet	1966	Winter Park	
Pony Express	Double	Heron-Poma	1974	Mary Jane	
Lariat	Rope Tow	Poma	2002	Winter Park	
Spirit	Platter surface lift	Poma	2004	Winter Park	
Comet	Conveyor	Magic Carpet	2019	Winter Park	
Meteor	Conveyor	Magic Carpet	2019	Winter Park	

==== Former lifts ====
Winter Park Colorado

Lift Name	Type	Manufacturer	Years of Operation	Notes
Sunnyside	Triple	CTEC	1989-2019	Replaced by a high-speed six pack
Apollo	Platter	Leitner-Poma	2004-2009	
Apollo	Double	Riblet	1969-1998	Replaced by Eskimo Express
Comet	T-Bar		1957-1977	Replaced by Arrow triple
Eskimo	Double	Riblet	1963-1990	Destroyed in 1990 as part of a series of tests that included an uncontrolled rollback, trees falling on the line, and a fire in the motor room. Replaced by the Eskimo triple.
Eskimo	Triple	Yan	1990-1999	Replaced with Eskimo Express; Relocated from Zephyr. Later sold to Jackson Hole Mountain Resort.
Gemini	Double	Miner-Denver	1969-1993	Replaced by Gemini Express
High Lonesome	Quad	Poma	1985-1991	Converted to high speed quad
Hughes	Double	Riblet	1962-1993	Replaced by Gemini Express
Meteor	T-Bar	Swiss	1957-1977	Replaced with Outrigger triple
Olympia	Double	Heron-Poma	1971-1996	Replaced by Olympia Express; featured a midway unload station
Outrigger	T-Bar	Swiss	1948-1978	
Outrigger	Triple	Yan	1978-2005	SBNO from 2003 to 2005; relocated to Vasquez Ridge and operates as Eagle Wind
Pioneer Express	High Speed Quad	Poma	1986-2023	Replaced by Wild Spur Express
Prospector	Double	Riblet	1963-1994	Replaced by Prospector Express
Summit Express	High speed quad	Poma	1985-2005	Replaced by Super Gauge Express. Lift relocated to Mission Ridge Ski Area where it operated until 2020.
Timberline	Double	Heron-Poma/Thiokol	1992-2007	Relocated from Ski Granby Ranch (formerly Sol Vista); replaced by Panoramic Express
Zephyr	Triple	Yan	1983-1990	Replaced by Zephyr Express; was later reinstalled as Eskimo before being sold to Jackson Hole in 1999
Zephyr Express	High speed quad	Poma	1990-2018	Replaced with ten-person gondola
Bob Woods	T-bar		1940-1969	Replaced with Apollo double

=== Historic Trails ===
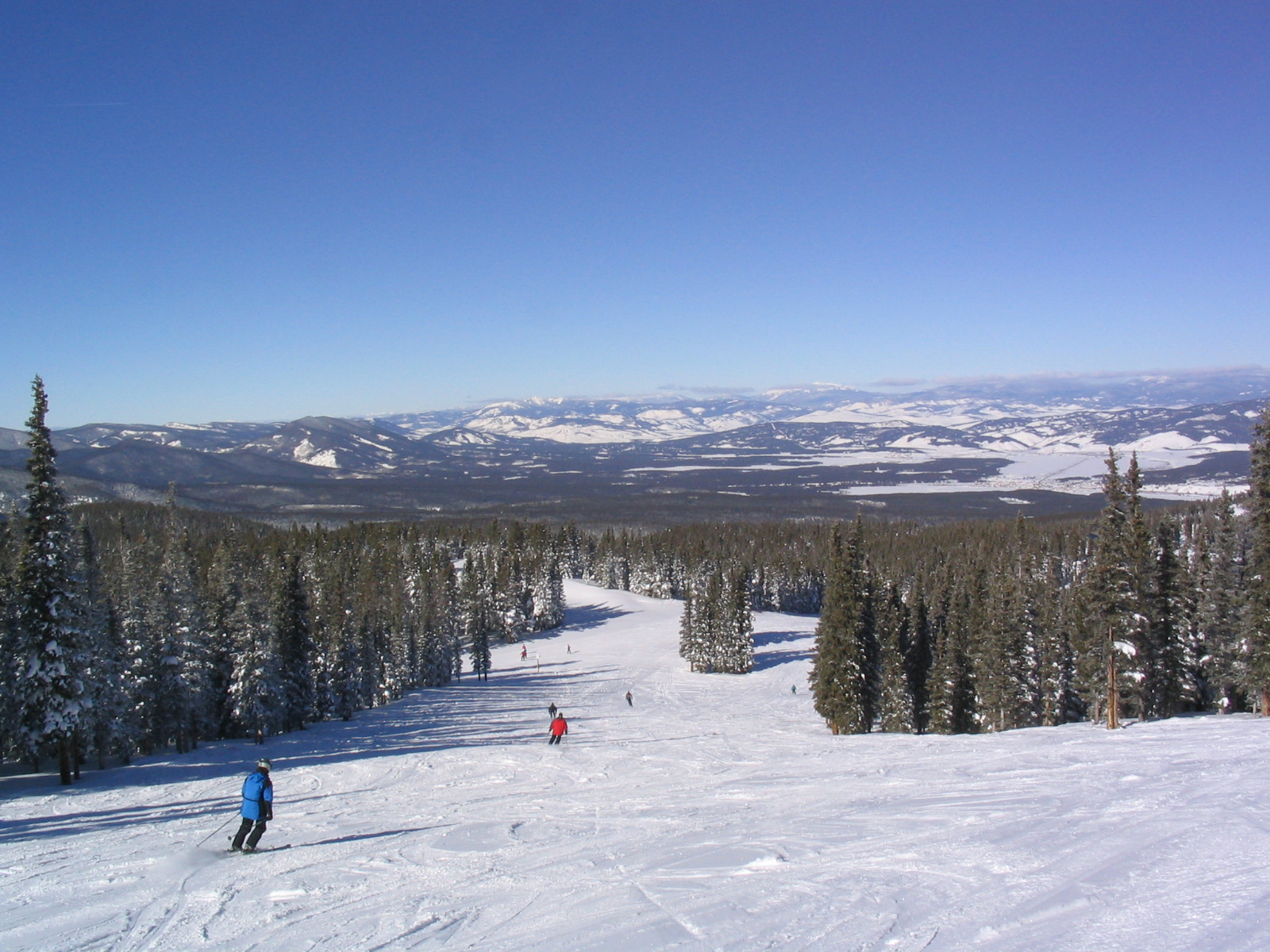
Ski trail near the top of Winter Park Resort.

During Winter Park's 75-year history, many individuals have made significant contributions to the development and image of the ski area. Several ski trails have been identified on the resort's website as "historical trails," and even more exist on the mountain. A commemorative sign, with a brief narrative about the individual's contribution to the ski area, has been installed along each historical trail. Listed are both the run and in parentheses the lift that reaches them:

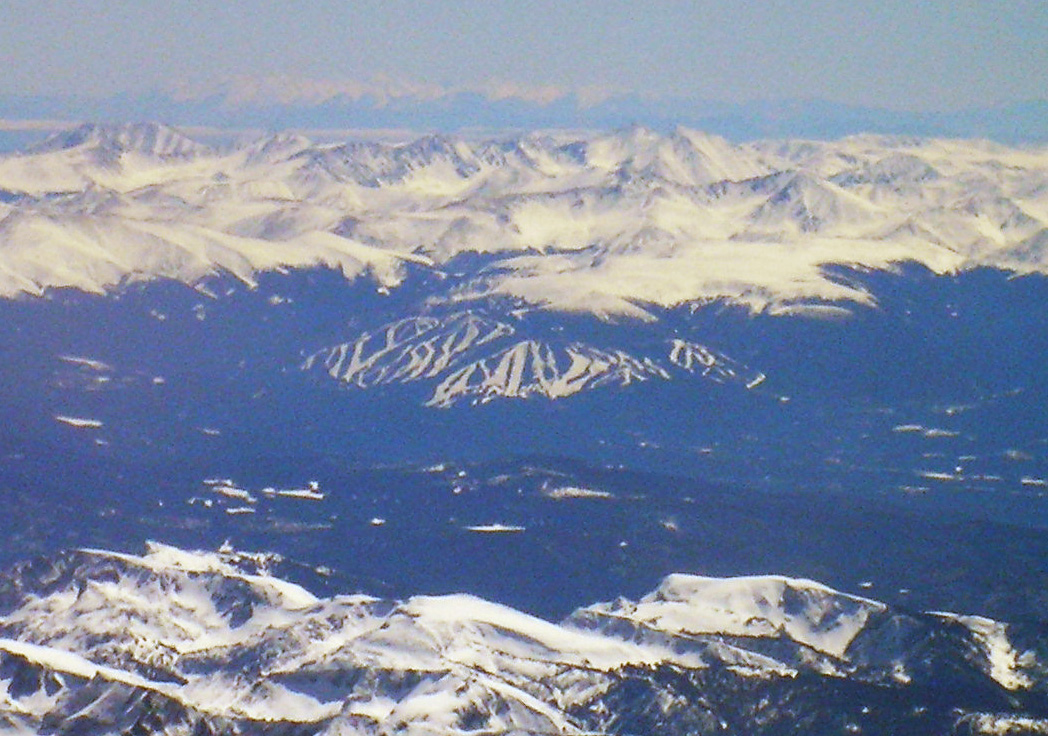
Winter Park Resort nestled in with the Continental Divide

- Hughes (The Gondola or Explorer Express)
- Cranmer (The Gondola or Explorer Express)
- Allan Phipps (The Gondola, Explorer Express or Prospector Express)
- Bradley's Bash (The Gondola or Explorer Express)
- Mulligan's Mile (The Gondola or Explorer Express)
- Jack Kendrick (Prospector Express or Looking Glass)
- Mt. Maury (learning slope with carpet)
- Retta's Run (Explorer Express lift line)
- Engeldive (Prospector Express and Looking Glass)
- Balch (The Gondola or Explorer Express)
- Wilson's Way (Discovery learning double)
- Mary Jane Trail (reached from Super Gauge Express, Olympia Express or High Lonesome Express)
- Over N' Underwood (Prospector Express or Looking Glass) (not listed on website)
- Butch's Breezeway (Prospector Express or Looking Glass) (not listed on website)

== Notable people ==
- Elizabeth McIntyre (born 1965), freestyle skier, Olympic silver medalist; lives in Winter Park
- Ryan Max Riley (born 1979), freestyle skier, US Champion, and humorist; lived in Winter Park
- Ryan St. Onge (born 1983), freestyle skier, World Champion and two-time Olympian; lived in Winter Park
- Michelle Roark (born 1974), freestyle skier, World Champion silver medalist and two-time Olympian; lived in Winter Park
- Birk Irving (born 1999), freestyle skier, World Champion bronze medalist, X-Games silver medalist, X-Games bronze medalist, Olympian; lived in Winter Park

== See also ==
- Winter Park Express, which serves the park at the Winter Park Resort station
- Ski Idlewild
