= Littleton station =

Littleton station may refer to:

- Littleton–Downtown station, Colorado
- Littleton–Mineral station, Colorado
- Littleton/Route 495 station, Massachusetts
