= Winter Park Express =

Seasonal train service between Denver and Winter Park Resort, Colorado

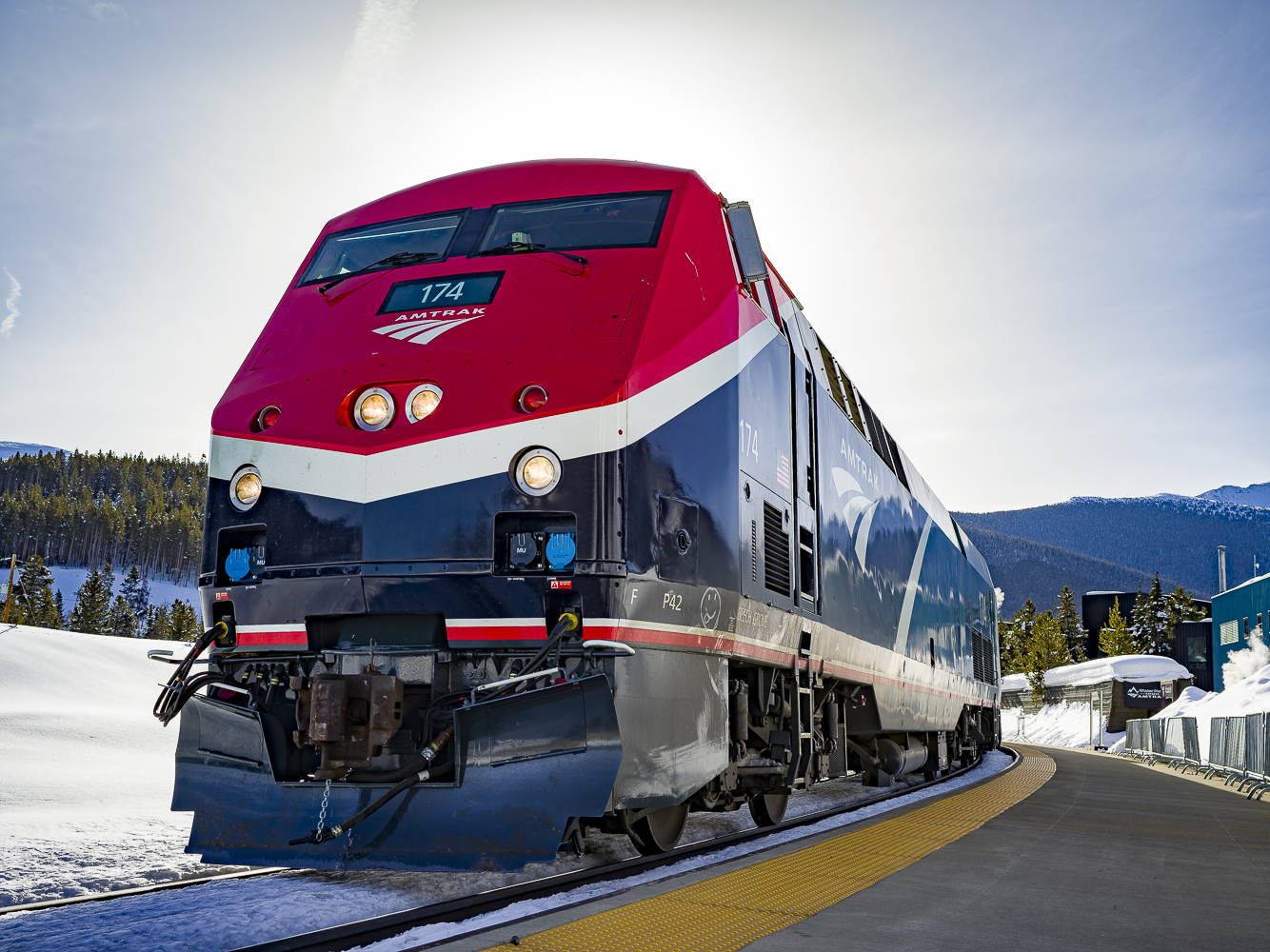
- Westbound Winter Park Express at Winter Park Resort station in March 2022

Overview
- Service type: Inter-city rail
- Status: Seasonal (January–March)
- Locale: Colorado
- First service: 1940
- Current operator: Amtrak
- Former operator: Rio Grande
- Annual ridership: 41,134 (FY 2025)
- Website: amtrak.com/winter-park-express

Route
- Termini: Denver, Colorado; Fraser, Colorado
- Stops: 3
- Distance travelled: 62 miles (100 km)
- Average journey time: 2 hours, 5 minutes
- Service frequency: Five round trips per week (Thursday–Monday)
- Train numbers: 1105 (westbound); 1106 (eastbound)
- Line used: UP Central Corridor

On-board services
- Class: Coach Class
- Disabled access: Train lower level, all stations
- Catering facilities: Café
- Observation facilities: Sightseer lounge car
- Baggage facilities: Overhead racks, dedicated storage for skis

Technical
- Rolling stock: GE Genesis; Superliner
- Track gauge: 4 ft 8 1/2 in (1,435 mm) standard gauge
- Operating speed: 27 mph (43 km/h)
Route map
Key

The Winter Park Express is a seasonal passenger train service operated by Amtrak between Denver Union Station, Winter Park Resort, and Fraser, Colorado. As of 2026, the train runs five days a week (Thursday to Monday) from January to March.

The scenic 62-mile (100 km) route, the shortest in the Amtrak system, uses the same line as the long-distance California Zephyr. From Denver, the Winter Park Express climbs 4,000 feet (1,200 m) into the Front Range and passes through 30 tunnels—including the historic 6.2-mile (10.0 km) Moffat Tunnel under the Continental Divide—before dropping passengers within 100 yards (91 m) of Winter Park's ski lifts. The train then continues 6 miles (9.7 km) to the town of Fraser.

The rail service, formerly known as the Ski Train was started by the Denver and Rio Grande Western Railroad (better known simply as the Rio Grande) when the ski area opened in 1940. Ansco Investment Company ran the Ski Train from 1988 to March 2009, when service was canceled due to mounting costs. Amtrak revived the route in January 2017, after several sold-out special event trains in 2015 showed popular demand. In 2025, more than 41,000 riders made use of the system during the 3-month seasonal service.

== History ==
=== 1940–1988: Rio Grande operation ===
The Denver and Rio Grande Western Railroad started the Ski Train in 1940.

There was one trip in each direction per day, with a travel time of 2 hours and 15 minutes, assuming no delays from freight rail traffic.

In the 1960s, 22-car trains to Winter Park were regularly moving an estimated 1,800 passengers, many of them young, unsupervised and sometimes rowdy. On one trip, a youngster pulled the emergency brake on a moving train, damaging one coach's coupler and steam line. After the incident, the railroad hired three sheriff's deputies to patrol the train.

At least during the early 1970s, the train made a stop in the Rocky Flats area.

=== 1988–2009: Ansco Investment Company operation ===
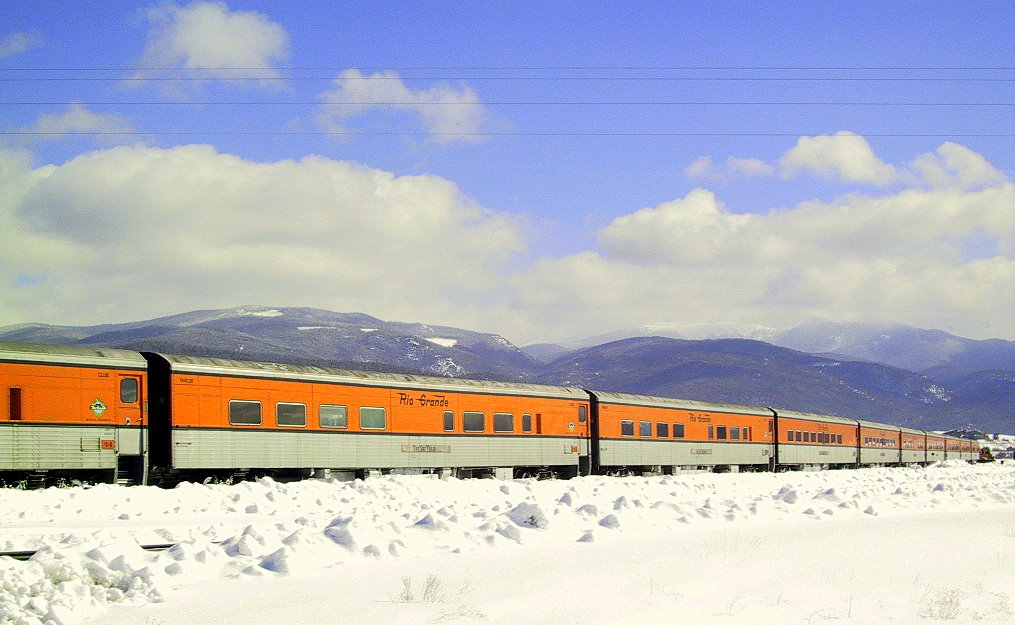
Ski Train at Tabernash, Colorado, 2003

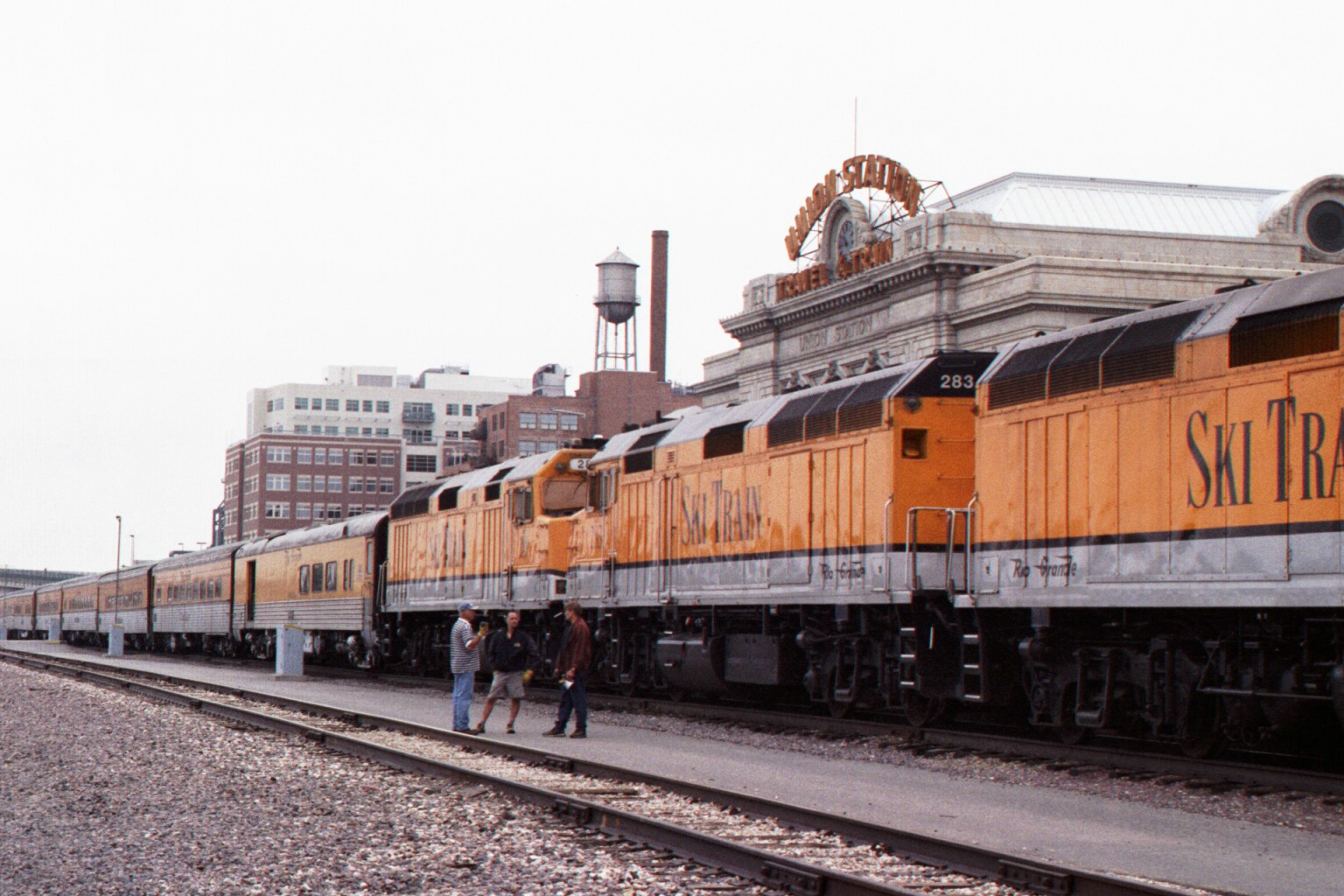
Ski Train at Denver Union Station, 2003

In 1988 the operation was sold to Ansco Investment Company, which made various needed improvements and ran the “New Ski Train” for two decades under the reporting mark SKTX.

In this era the Ski Train consisted of three locomotives pulling fourteen cars: eight coaches, three club cars, two cafe lounge cars, and one retreat car. The train accommodated 750 passengers.

On January 21, 2006, the return trip was canceled after a coal train derailment blocked the line, leaving some 700 passengers stuck in Winter Park. Buses were summoned to provide return transportation to Denver, and refunds offered to those who made alternate arrangements. Just two months later, on March 19, another freight train derailment delayed the return Ski Train for almost six hours, with the train arriving in Denver around midnight.

In 2007, a blizzard forced cancellation of service on December 29 and 30.

The Ski Train made its final run to Winter Park on March 29, 2009. It had been burdened with escalating costs such as liability insurance coverage, operational conflicts with freight traffic, and substantial uncertainties posed by the redevelopment of Denver's Union Station. Combined with the 2008 financial crisis, it was no longer feasible to operate the Ski Train.

The equipment was sold to the Algoma Central Railway, a subsidiary of Canadian National Railway. Ironically, the Ski Train's cars had been originally built in 1968 by Hawker Siddeley for use on CN's Tempos. The F40PH locomotives and most passenger cars were refurbished and repainted to Algoma Central's livery and are now in use on the railway's Agawa Canyon tourist train.

=== 2009: Iowa Pacific Holdings revival bid ===
Iowa Pacific Holdings (IPH), a holding company that owned railroad properties across North America and the United Kingdom (including San Luis & Rio Grande in southern Colorado), made a bid to revive the Ski Train using idle equipment from SL&RG's subsidiary, Rio Grande Scenic Railroad. Plans fell through due to Amtrak, who would be supplying staff, classifying the Ski Train as a commuter operation instead of an excursion train, resulting in higher liability insurance. Iowa Pacific sued Amtrak, with Amtrak agreeing to settle the matter on December 23, 2009, five days prior to the first day operations were to commence (December 27), with a payment to Iowa Pacific. Full refunds were made by IPH to customers who purchased tickets.

=== 2015–present: Amtrak Winter Park Express ===
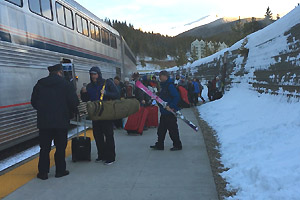
Winter Park Express at the resort, 2018

In February 2015, Amtrak, Winter Park Resort and the Union Pacific Railroad announced that a special one-day-only "Winter Park Express" train would run on Saturday, March 14, in celebration of the 75th anniversary of Winter Park. With tickets priced at $75, all 400 seats sold out within 12 hours. By popular demand, a second train was added for Sunday, March 15, and it also sold out quickly.

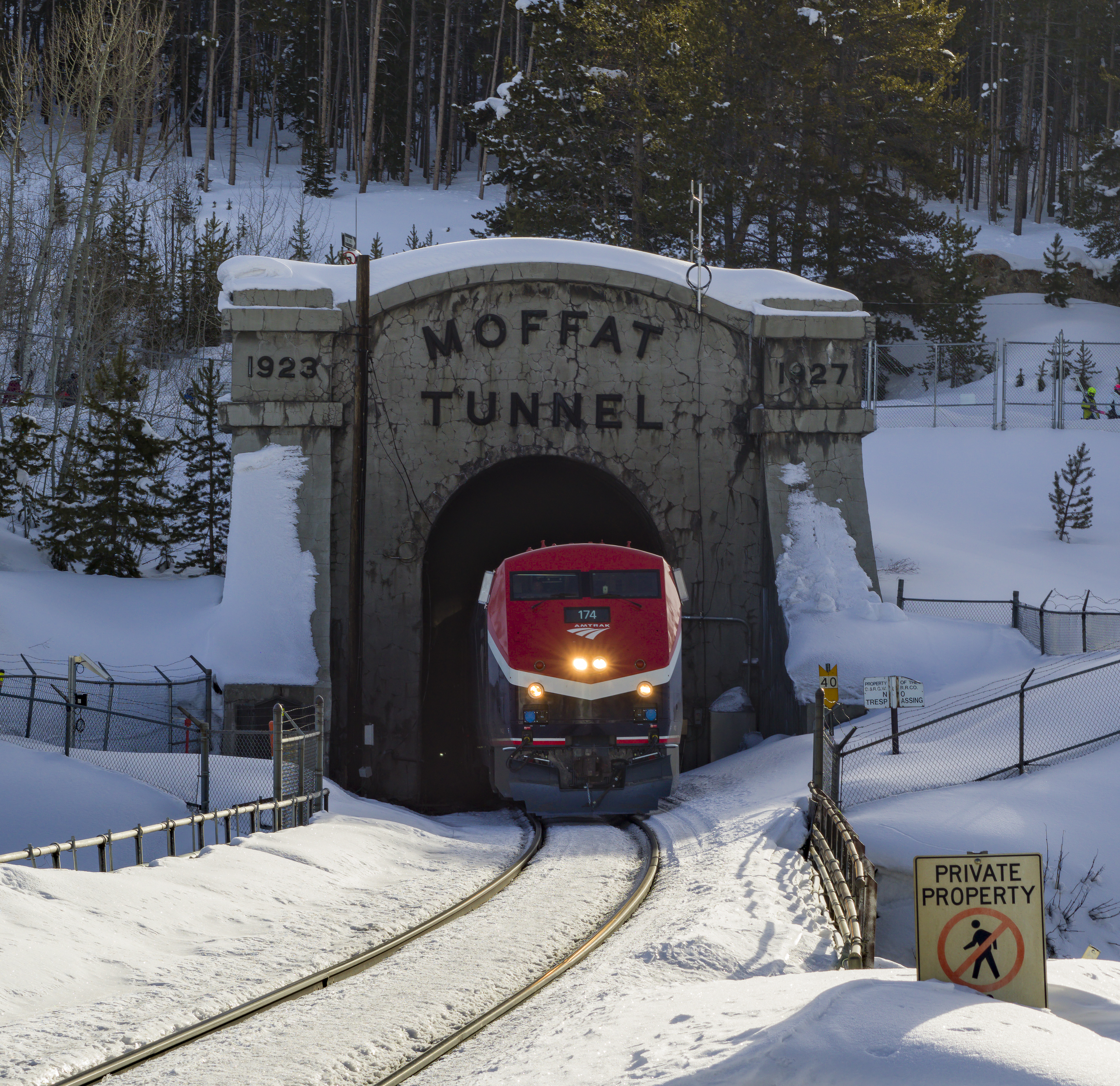
The Winter Park Express exiting the Moffat Tunnel in 2024

With demonstrated enthusiasm for the excursion train, there were renewed hopes that the Ski Train would again operate seasonally from the recently redeveloped Denver Union Station public transit complex. In April, Amtrak and Winter Park officials met to begin work on a proposal to track owner Union Pacific for running at least two trips weekly between January and March 2016. Ultimately the negotiations were unable to make the service happen in 2016, but all groups continued to meet into the new year.

In August 2016, Amtrak and its partners announced regular Winter Park Express weekend service from January through March 2017. In its first full season, the Winter Park Express ran 25 trips and saw 18,000 passengers, about 30% of which were non-skiers. The train suffered one major service disruption on March 11, 2017, when a freight train derailment forced the cancellation of the Saturday run.

After a successful first season, expanded service was announced for the 2017–18 season, including first-Friday round trips and lower ticket prices for some departures. Amtrak added a Superliner Sightseer lounge and café car to the train for the 2018–19 season, featuring food and drink service along with floor-to-ceiling views. This upgrade had been the "biggest request" from riders. For the 2019–20 season, Winter Park's 80th, service was added on every Friday.

In March 2020, the Winter Park Express was suspended during a round of Amtrak service reductions in response to the COVID-19 pandemic. The train did not run in the 2021 season. Amtrak reported total ridership of nearly 70,000 from the train's introduction in 2017 through to the 2020 service suspension.

In November 2021, Amtrak and Winter Park Resort announced that service would return for the 2022 season. The train ran on its 2019 schedule, with Friday, Saturday, and Sunday service from mid-January through early April.

The 2023 season ran for eleven weekends starting on January 13, for 33 total round trips. The 2024 season ran weekends from January 12 to March 31, plus two Thursdays, for a total of 40 round trips.

In November 2024 it was announced that for the 2025 season the train would run five times a week from Thursday to Monday between January 9th and March 31st. In addition, the train would also run Friday to Sunday on the last two weekends of December 2024. Service was extended to Fraser–Winter Park station. As a result of the expanded schedule and lowered prices, the service saw record ridership in the 2025 season, with more than 41,000 bookings made, according to the State of Colorado.

Following this success, Amtrak and the Colorado Department of Transportation (CDOT) confirmed the continuation of the expanded 5 day weekly schedule for the 2026 season. Operations for 2026 began on January 8, utilizing expanded consists with additional Superliner coaches during peak holiday weekends to meet sustained demand.

=== Future plans ===
In June 2021, Colorado created a district to advance Front Range Passenger Rail, a proposed train service between Pueblo, Colorado Springs, Denver, Boulder, and Fort Collins. The legislation specifically calls for interconnectivity with the Winter Park Express. Rail advocates have seen the Winter Park Express as a springboard for building interest in Front Range service.

In September 2023, local officials expressed interest in extending the Winter Park Express to Steamboat Springs to connect more ski resorts. In addition to tourist service, regular commuter rail is proposed between Winter Park, State Bridge, Bond, Yampa, Oak Creek, Steamboat Springs, Hayden, and Craig, with a spur to Yampa Valley Regional Airport. The proposal aims to capitalize on increased line capacity due to a reduction in coal and oil transport.

In December 2024, Union Pacific and the state reached a tentative agreement to extend the railroad's lease of the Moffat Tunnel by 25 years. Under that agreement, daily year-round service between Denver and Grand County could begin by late 2026, with possible expansion to three daily round trips between Denver and Craig.

In January 2026, leveraging the high ridership data from the Winter Park Express, The Colorado legislature advanced initial funding to begin the formal environmental impact study for the full "Mountain Rail" line. The Winter Park Express is viewed as the "Phase 1" operational proof of concept for this broader regional network.

As of February 2026, Mountain Rail is still scheduled to open by the end of the year.

Meanwhile, in July 2026, a private group announced a proposal for a competing railroad called Denver West Express, which would be a new battery locomotive-hauled passenger train between Denver International Airport and several ski areas.

== Route ==
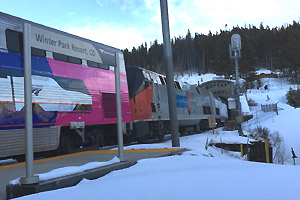
Winter Park Express stopped at the resort, just past the Moffat Tunnel west portal, January 2018

The Winter Park Express runs from Union Station in Denver, Colorado, for 56 miles (90 km) to Winter Park Resort in the town of Winter Park, then continues to Fraser–Winter Park station. Heading west from Denver, the train climbs 3,960 feet (1,210 m) up the Front Range via a series of 29 tunnels—the "Tunnel District"—through the Plainview, Crescent, Wondervu and Gross Reservoir areas, then generally west along South Boulder Creek through Pinecliffe, Tolland and Rollinsville to the final mountain underpass, the 6.2-mile (10.0 km) long Moffat Tunnel under the Continental Divide. This is the highest railroad tunnel in the United States and the third-longest, after the Cascade Tunnel in Washington state and the Flathead Tunnel in Montana.

When the Winter Park Express is not operating, riders can still reach Winter Park via Amtrak's long-distance California Zephyr. This daily train follows the same route from Denver but does not stop directly at Winter Park Resort's platform. Instead, riders can disembark several miles down the track at Fraser–Winter Park station, where transit buses operated by the city's "The Lift" service connects to the resort. Travelers thus have two train options to travel between Denver and Winter Park on days when the Winter Park Express is running.

== See also ==
- List of Colorado historic railroads
