= Winter Park, Colorado =

Town in Colorado, United States

- Home rule town
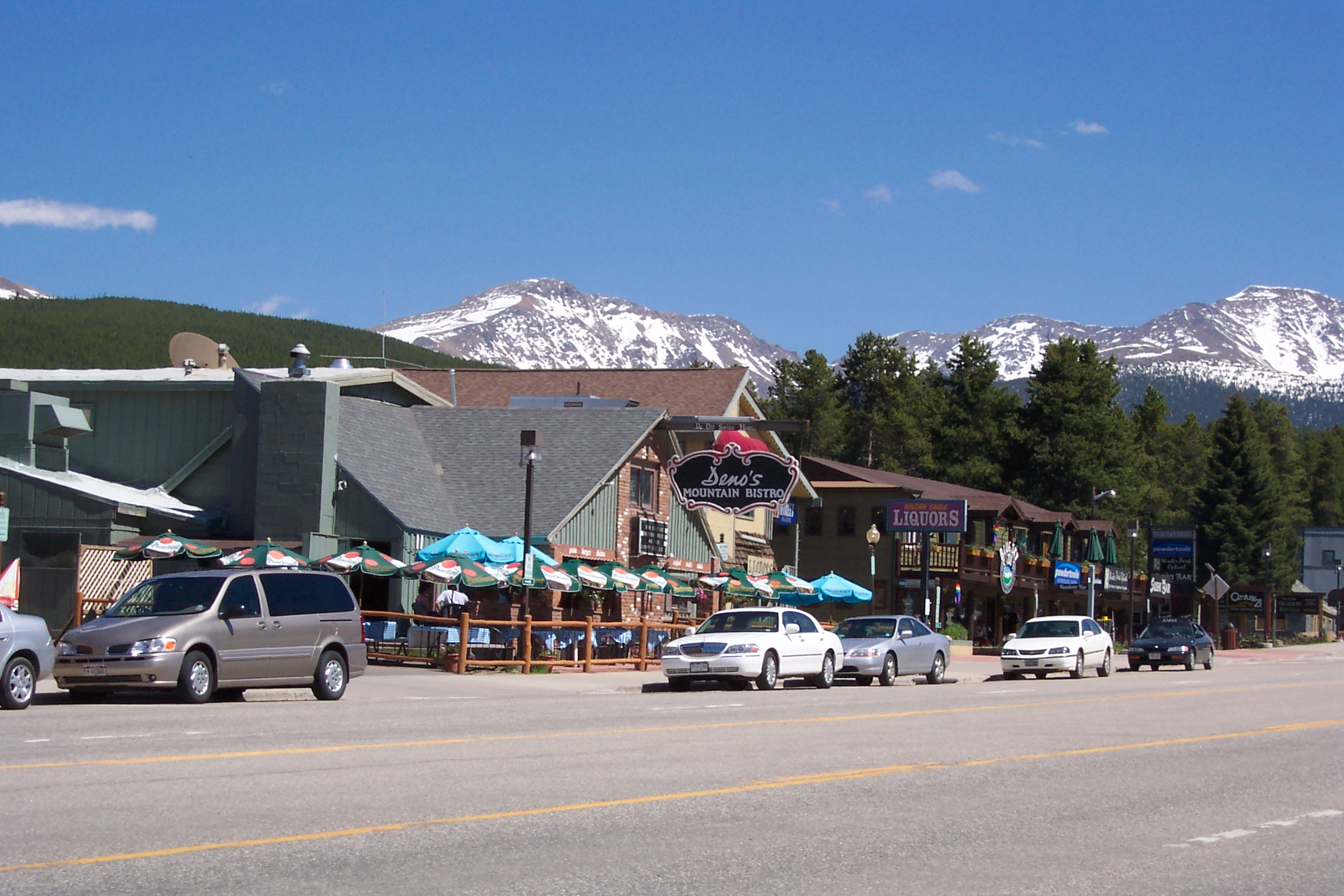
- Part of downtown Winter Park with the Continental Divide in the background
- Motto: Colorado's Highest
- Coordinates: 39°52′43″N 105°46′58″W
- Country: United States
- State: Colorado
- County: Grand
- Founded: August 1, 1978
- Incorporated: September 1, 1979

Government
  - Type: Home rule municipality

Area
  - Total: 16.89 sq mi (43.74 km^{2})
  - Land: 16.89 sq mi (43.74 km^{2})
  - Water: 0 sq mi (0.00 km^{2})
- Elevation: 10,128 ft (3,087 m)

Population (2020)
  - Total: 1,033
  - Density: 61.17/sq mi (23.62/km^{2})
- Time zone: UTC-7 (MST)
  - Summer (DST): UTC-6 (MDT)
- ZIP code: 80482 (PO Box)
- Area code: 970
- FIPS code: 08-85705
- GNIS feature ID: 2413502
- Website: www.wpgov.com
- Highest incorporated town in the U.S.

Winter Park is a home rule municipality in Grand County, Colorado, United States. The permanent population was 1,033 at the 2020 census, although with 2,850 housing units within the town limits the seasonal population can be much higher.

It is home to Winter Park Resort, a ski resort owned by the City of Denver and managed by Alterra Mountain Company. The town and resort are served by the Winter Park Express ski train run by Amtrak. The area also has cross-country skiing opportunities, including Devil's Thumb Ranch Resort & Spa. In the spring and summer, Winter Park is known for mountain biking, concerts, hiking, and fishing.

== Geography ==
Winter Park is located in southeastern Grand County at the southern end of the Fraser Valley. It is bordered to the north by the town of Fraser. U.S. Route 40 passes through the town, leading south and east over Berthoud Pass 66 miles (106 km) to Denver and northwest 20 miles (32 km) to Granby.

According to the United States Census Bureau, the town has a total area of 16.5 square miles (42.7 km^{2}).

Its elevation ranges from approximately 8,700 to 12,060 feet (2,650 to 3,680 m) above sea level, and is considered sub-alpine country. It is snow-covered for about six months a year. Although the town center is at about 9,000 feet (2,700 m) above sea level, Winter Park, using administrative boundaries as a measure, became the highest incorporated town in the United States after the July 2006 annexation of 5,214 acres (21.10 km^{2}) of Winter Park Resort to allow new on-mountain improvements. This claim is disputed since Winter Park has no residences above 9,550 feet (2,910 m), while contiguous residential neighborhoods in Leadville, Colorado, extend to 10,360 feet (3,160 m) and in Alma, Colorado, to 11,680 feet (3,560 m), and Alma's town center is at 10,361 feet (3,158 m).

=== Climate ===
According to the Köppen Climate Classification system, Winter Park has a subarctic climate, abbreviated "Dfc" on climate maps.

Climate data for Winter Park, Colorado, 1991–2020 normals
Month	Jan	Feb	Mar	Apr	May	Jun	Jul	Aug	Sep	Oct	Nov	Dec	Year
Mean daily maximum °F (°C)	29.8 (−1.2)	32.4 (0.2)	40.0 (4.4)	47.1 (8.4)	56.1 (13.4)	68.0 (20.0)	73.1 (22.8)	71.0 (21.7)	64.0 (17.8)	51.7 (10.9)	38.4 (3.6)	29.7 (−1.3)	50.1 (10.1)
Mean daily minimum °F (°C)	6.7 (−14.1)	7.1 (−13.8)	13.7 (−10.2)	19.8 (−6.8)	28.5 (−1.9)	36.6 (2.6)	41.0 (5.0)	40.8 (4.9)	34.1 (1.2)	25.0 (−3.9)	14.5 (−9.7)	6.8 (−14.0)	22.9 (−5.1)
Average precipitation inches (mm)	2.13 (54)	2.29 (58)	2.54 (65)	3.34 (85)	2.42 (61)	1.49 (38)	2.16 (55)	2.01 (51)	1.77 (45)	1.88 (48)	2.17 (55)	2.20 (56)	26.4 (671)
Average snowfall inches (cm)	33.2 (84)	30.8 (78)	31.9 (81)	31.5 (80)	11.2 (28)	1.0 (2.5)	0.0 (0.0)	0.0 (0.0)	1.3 (3.3)	14.2 (36)	26.8 (68)	32.1 (82)	214.0 (544)
Average extreme snow depth inches (cm)	36.0 (91)	42.6 (108)	44.6 (113)	32.9 (84)	12.9 (33)	0.5 (1.3)	0.0 (0.0)	0.0 (0.0)	1.2 (3.0)	6.9 (18)	14.2 (36)	26.3 (67)	46.5 (118)
Average precipitation days (≥ 0.01 in)	13.0	11.3	11.0	11.0	9.5	7.2	10.2	11.6	8.7	8.2	10.7	11.7	124.1
Average snowy days (≥ 0.1 in)	12.3	11.0	10.4	9.6	3.8	0.3	0.0	0.0	0.6	5.3	9.7	10.7	73.7
Source: NOAA

== Demographics ==
Historical population
Census	Pop.	Note	%±
1980	480		—
1990	528		10.0%
2000	662		25.4%
2010	999		50.9%
2020	1,033		3.4%
U.S. Decennial Census

=== 2020 census ===
As of the 2020 census, Winter Park had a population of 1,033. The median age was 39.4 years. 11.3% of residents were under the age of 18 and 15.2% of residents were 65 years of age or older. For every 100 females there were 127.0 males, and for every 100 females age 18 and over there were 129.0 males age 18 and over.

86.0% of residents lived in urban areas, while 14.0% lived in rural areas.

There were 511 households in Winter Park, of which 15.5% had children under the age of 18 living in them. Of all households, 36.2% were married-couple households, 31.1% were households with a male householder and no spouse or partner present, and 19.8% were households with a female householder and no spouse or partner present. About 34.8% of all households were made up of individuals and 5.6% had someone living alone who was 65 years of age or older.

There were 2,736 housing units, of which 81.3% were vacant. The homeowner vacancy rate was 3.1% and the rental vacancy rate was 55.0%.

Racial composition as of the 2020 census
Race	Number	Percent
White	936	90.6%
Black or African American	8	0.8%
American Indian and Alaska Native	4	0.4%
Asian	19	1.8%
Native Hawaiian and Other Pacific Islander	3	0.3%
Some other race	10	1.0%
Two or more races	53	5.1%
Hispanic or Latino (of any race)	47	4.5%

== Notable people ==
- Siblings Birk Irving and Svea Irving, Olympian freestyle skiers, call Winter Park home.
- Elizabeth McIntyre (born 1965), freestyle skier, Olympic silver medalist; lives in Winter Park
- Ryan St. Onge (born 1983), freestyle skier, World Champion and two-time Olympian; lived in Winter Park
- Ryan Max Riley (born 1979), freestyle skier, US Champion, and humorist; lived in Winter Park
- Michelle Roark (born 1974), freestyle skier, World Champion silver medalist and two-time Olympian; lived in Winter Park

== Transportation ==
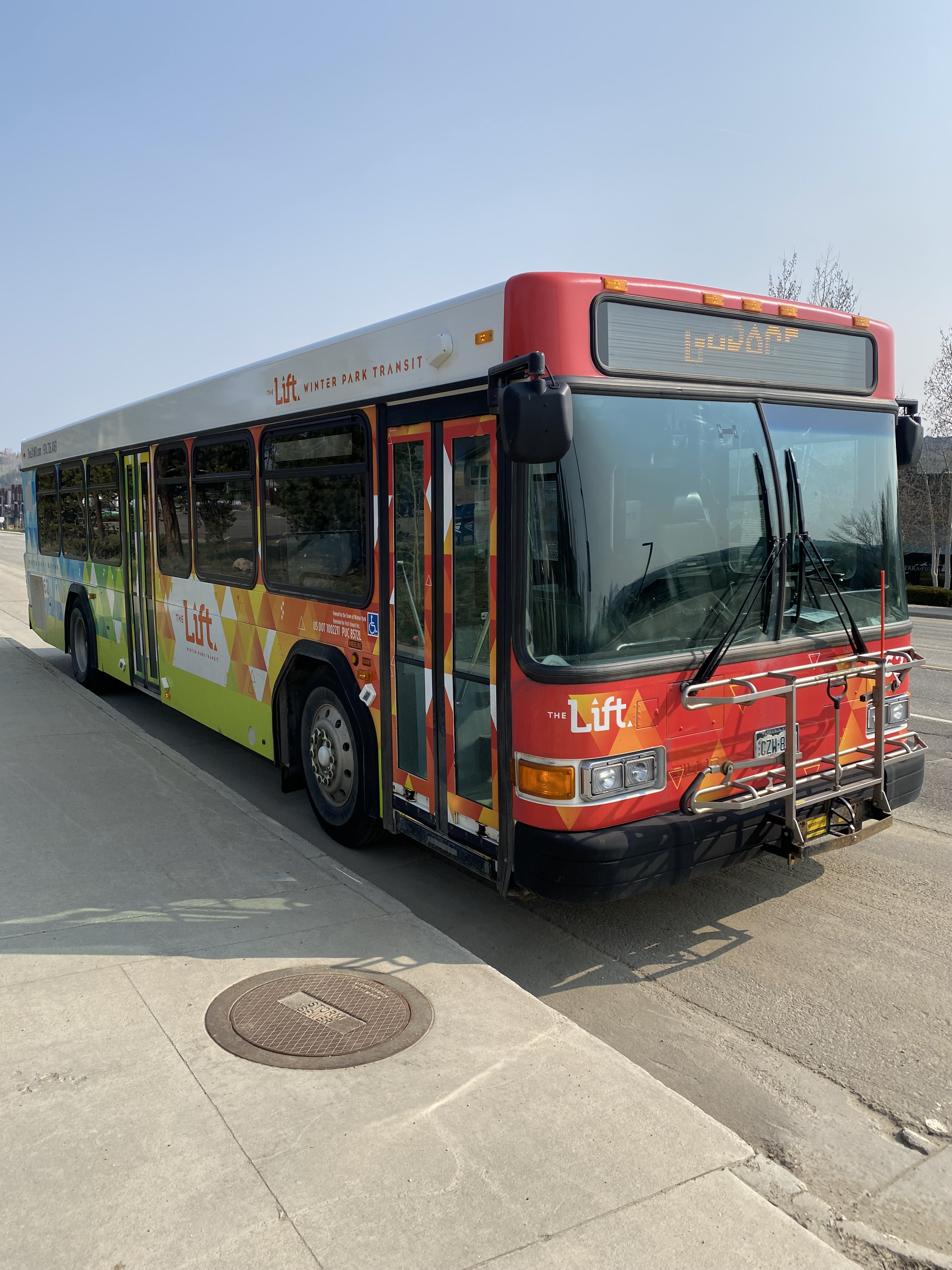
The Lift Bus, Winter Park Transit

The Town of Winter Park provides local and regional bus service with The Lift bus system. The Lift provides fixed route and paratransit to Winter Park, CO, Fraser, CO, and Winter Park Resort. The system also provides commuter bus service to Granby, CO.

Amtrak serves Winter Park via the Fraser-Winter Park station located in Fraser, CO. The California Zephyr and Winter Park Express(winter only) both have twice daily stops at the station, one westbound and one eastbound.

Year round train service from Denver, CO to Granby, CO that will stop at the Fraser-Winter Park station is scheduled to begin service in November 2026.

Bustang Outrider is a state regional bus service providing twice daily service to Winter Park on the Craig-Denver line. The Morning run provides eastbound service to Idaho Springs, CO and Denver, CO. The afternoon/evening run provides westbound service to Steamboat Springs, CO, Craig, CO, and other intermediate stops.

Other transportation options include Home James Transportation and Grand Mountain Rides which have provided shared shuttle and private charter transportation.

== See also ==
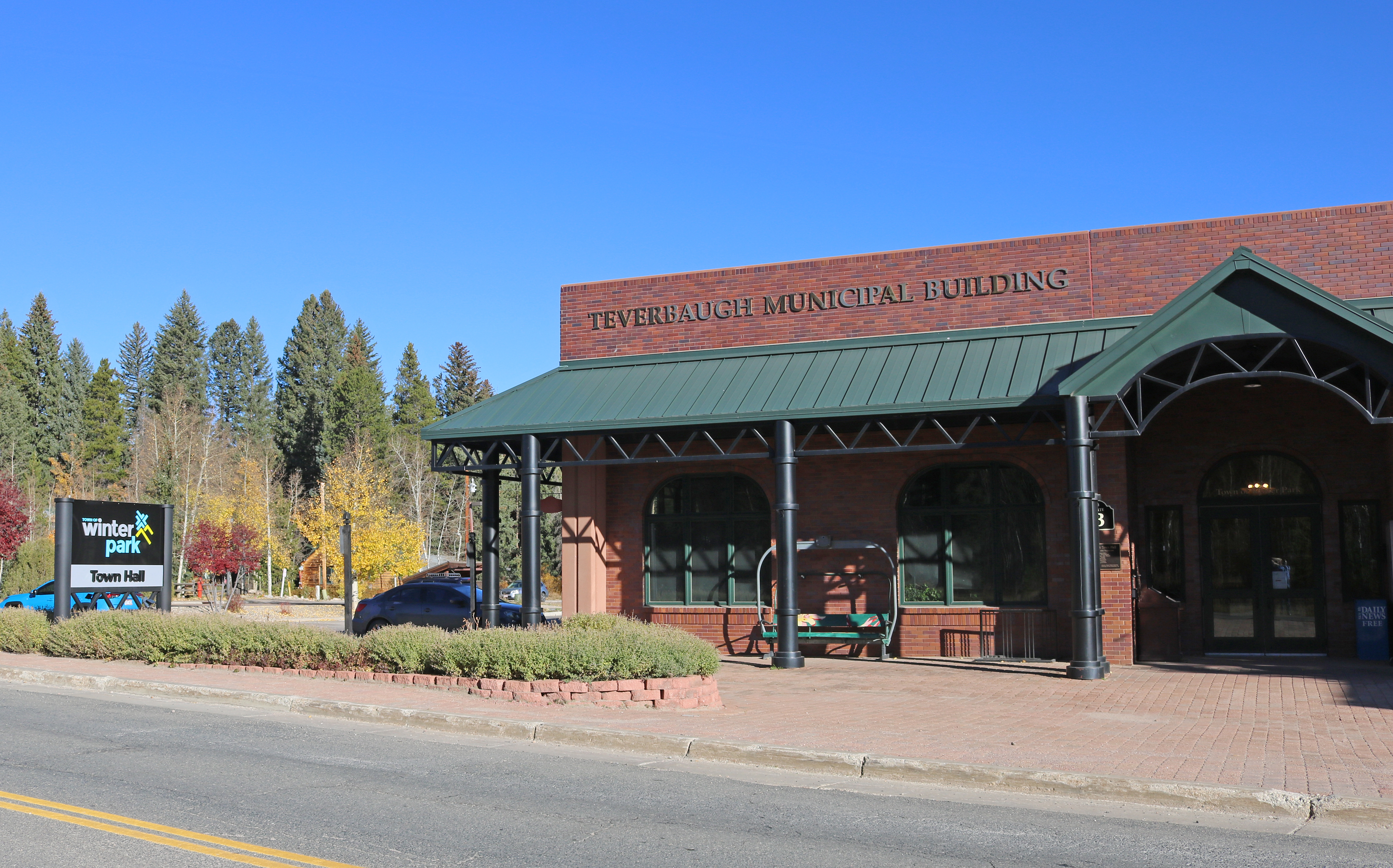
Winter Park Town Hall

- Arapaho National Forest
- Winter Park Resort
- Moffat Tunnel
