= NCAA skiing championships =

American collegiate snow ski tournament

NCAA Skiing Championship
- NCAA logo
- Association: NCAA
- Sport: Skiing
- Founded: 1954; 72 years ago
- Division: Division I, Division II, and Division III
- Country: United States
- Most recent champion: University of Utah (17)
- Most titles: Team: Denver (24); Individual: Colorado (105)
- Website: NCAA.com

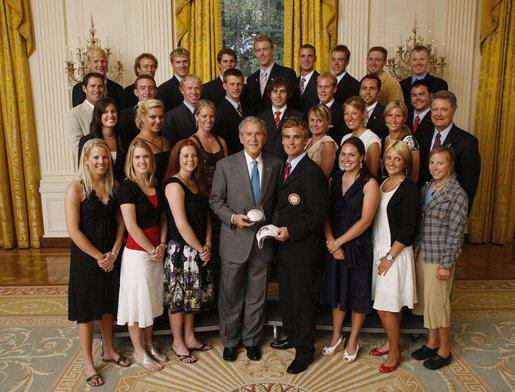
The Denver Pioneers at the White House with President George W. Bush in June 2008. Through 2020, Denver owns the most team titles at 24.

The NCAA Skiing Championships are held annually to crown the National Collegiate Athletic Association combined men's and women's team skiing champion. Before 1983, the championship was only for men's skiing. Unlike many NCAA sports, only one National Collegiate championship is held each season with teams from Division I, Division II, and Division III competing together.

The University of Denver has won a record 24 team titles, including ten since 2000. The University of Colorado is second with 20 titles (plus one AIAW title), and the University of Utah is third with 17 (plus one AIAW title).

Denver won the first NCAA championship in 1954 at Reno with 384 points, 34.4 points ahead of runner-up Seattle University. The scoring system has been modified over the years; in 2012, Vermont scored a record 832 points, with a record margin of 161 points over second-place Utah.

The 2020 edition started on schedule, but was canceled in progress due to the COVID-19 pandemic.

== Team champions ==
NCAA Skiing Championships
Year	Site (Host Team)	Host Resort	Champion	Score	Runner-up	Score
Men's Championships
1954; Details	Reno, NV (Nevada)	Slide Mountain	Denver	384	Seattle	349.6
1955; Details	Northfield, VT (Norwich)	Norwich University Ski Area	Denver	567.05	Dartmouth	558.935
1956; Details	Winter Park, CO (Colorado, Denver)	Winter Park Ski Area	Denver	582.01	Dartmouth	541.77
1957; Details	Huntsville, UT (Utah, Utah State)	Snow Basin	Denver	577.95	Colorado	545.29
1958; Details	Lyme Center, NH (Dartmouth)	Dartmouth Skiway	Dartmouth	561.2	Denver	550.6
1959; Details	Winter Park, CO (Denver, Western State, Air Force)	Winter Park Ski Area	Colorado	549.4	Denver	543.6
1960; Details	Bozeman, MT (Montana State)	Bridger Bowl	Colorado	571.4	Denver	568.6
1961; Details	Hancock, VT (Middlebury)	Middlebury College Snow Bowl	Denver	376.19	Middlebury	366.94
1962; Details	Olympic Valley, CA (California, Nevada)	Squaw Valley	Denver	390.08	Colorado	374.30
1963; Details	Big Cottonwood Canyon, UT (Utah)	Solitude	Denver	384.6	Colorado	381.6
1964; Details	Franconia, NH (Dartmouth)	Cannon Mountain Ski Area	Denver	370.2	Dartmouth	368.8
1965; Details	Mount Baker-Snoqualmie N.F., WA (Washington)	Crystal Mountain	Denver	380.5	Utah	378.4
1966; Details	Crested Butte, CO	Crested Butte	Denver	381.02	Western State	365.92
1967; Details	Carrabassett Valley, ME	Sugarloaf	Denver	376.7	Wyoming	375.9
1968; Details	Steamboat Springs, CO	Mount Werner; Steamboat	Wyoming	383.9	Denver	376.2
1969; Details	Steamboat Springs, CO	Mount Werner; Steamboat	Denver	388.6	Dartmouth	372.0
1970; Details	Franconia, NH	Cannon Mountain Ski Area	Denver	386.6	Dartmouth	378.8
1971; Details	Lead, SD	Terry Peak	Denver	394.7	Colorado	373.1
1972; Details	Winter Park, CO (Colorado)	Winter Park Ski Area	Colorado	385.3	Denver	380.1
1973; Details	Hancock, VT (Middlebury)	Middlebury College Snow Bowl	Colorado	381.89	Wyoming	377.83
1974; Details	Teton Village, WY (Wyoming)	Jackson Hole	Colorado	176	Wyoming	162
1975; Details	Durango, CO (Fort Lewis)	Durango Mountain	Colorado	183	Vermont	115
1976; Details	Newry, ME (Bates)	Sunday River	Colorado; Dartmouth	112	—	
1977; Details	Winter Park, CO (Colorado)	Winter Park Ski Area	Colorado	179	Wyoming	154.5
1978; Details	Franconia, NH (New Hampshire)	Cannon Mountain Ski Area	Colorado	152.5	Wyoming	121.5
1979; Details	Steamboat Springs, CO (Colorado)	Mount Werner; Steamboat	Colorado	153	Utah	130
1980; Details	Lake Placid, NY & Stowe, VT	Whiteface & Stowe	Vermont	171	Utah	151
1981; Details	Park City, UT (Utah)	Park City Mountain Resort	Utah	183	Vermont	172
1982; Details	Lake Placid, NY (St. Lawrence)	Whiteface	Colorado	461	Vermont	436.5
Co-ed Championships
1983; Details	Bozeman, MT (Montana State)	Bridger Bowl	Utah	696	Vermont	650
1984; Details	Pinkham Notch, NH (New Hampshire)	Wildcat Mountain Ski Area	Utah	750.5	Vermont	684
1985; Details	Bozeman, MT (Montana State)	Bridger Bowl	Wyoming	764	Utah	744
1986; Details	Stowe, VT (Vermont)	Stowe Mountain Resort	Utah	612	Vermont	602
1987; Details	Girdwood, AK (Alaska–Anchorage)	Alyeska Resort	Utah	710	Vermont	627
1988; Details	Hancock, VT (Middlebury)	Middlebury College Snow Bowl	Utah	651	Vermont	614
1989; Details	Teton Village, WY (Wyoming)	Jackson Hole Mountain Resort	Vermont	672	Utah	668
1990; Details	Stowe, VT (Vermont)	Stowe Mountain Resort	Vermont	671	Utah	571
1991; Details	Park City, UT (Utah)	Park City Mountain Resort	Colorado	713	Vermont	682
1992; Details	Pinkham Notch, NH (New Hampshire)	Wildcat Mountain Ski Area	Vermont	693.5	New Mexico	642.5
1993; Details	Steamboat Springs, CO (Colorado)	Mount Werner; Steamboat Ski Resort	Utah	783	Vermont	700.5
1994; Details	Carrabassett Valley, ME (Colby College)	Sugarloaf Ski Resort	Vermont	688	Utah	667
1995; Details	Pinkham Notch, NH (New Hampshire)	Wildcat Mountain Ski Area	Colorado	720.5	Utah	711
1996; Details	Bozeman, MT (Montana State)	Bridger Bowl	Utah	719	Denver	635.5
1997; Details	Stowe, VT (Vermont)	Stowe Mountain Resort	Utah	686	Vermont	646.5
1998; Details	Bozeman, MT (Montana State)	Bridger Bowl	Colorado	654	Utah	651.5
1999; Details	Newry, ME (Bates)	Sunday River Ski Resort	Colorado	650	Denver	636
2000; Details	Park City, UT (Utah)	Park City Mountain Resort	Denver	720	Colorado	621
2001; Details	Hancock, VT (Middlebury)	Middlebury College Snow Bowl	Denver	649	Vermont	605
2002; Details	Girdwood, AK (Alaska–Anchorage)	Alyeska Resort	Denver	656	Colorado	612
2003; Details	Lyme Center, NH (Dartmouth)	Dartmouth Skiway	Utah	682	Vermont	551
2004; Details	Truckee, CA (Nevada)	Sugar Bowl Ski Resort	New Mexico	623	Utah	581
2005; Details	Hancock, VT (Middlebury)	Middlebury College Snow Bowl	Denver	622.5	Vermont	575
2006; Details	Steamboat Springs, CO (Colorado)	Howelsen Hill & Mount Werner; Steamboat Ski Resort	Colorado	654	New Mexico	556
2007; Details	Pinkham Notch, NH (New Hampshire)	Wildcat Mountain Ski Area	Dartmouth	698	Denver	648
2008; Details	Bozeman, MT (Montana State)	Bridger Bowl	Denver	649.5	Colorado	619
2009; Details	Newry, ME (Bates)	Sunday River Ski Resort	Denver	659	Colorado	602.5
2010; Details	Steamboat Springs, CO (Colorado)	Howelsen Hill & Mount Werner; Steamboat Ski Resort	Denver	785.5	Colorado	714
2011; Details	Stowe, VT (Vermont)	Stowe Mountain Resort	Colorado	831	Utah	705.5
2012; Details	Bozeman, MT (Montana State)	Bridger Bowl	Vermont	832	Utah	671
2013; Details	Hancock, VT (Middlebury)	Middlebury College Snow Bowl	Colorado	708	Utah	665
2014; Details	Park City, UT (Utah)	Park City Mountain Resort & Soldier Hollow Resort	Denver	556	Vermont	487.5
2015; Details	Lake Placid, NY (St. Lawrence)	Olympic Center	Colorado	506	Denver	478
2016; Details	Steamboat Springs, CO (Colorado)	Howelsen Hill & Mount Werner; Steamboat Ski Resort	Denver	567.5	Colorado	491.5
2017; Details	Franconia & Jackson, NH (New Hampshire)	Cannon Mountain Ski Area & Jackson Nordic Center	Utah	541.5	Colorado	525
2018	Steamboat Springs, CO (Colorado)	Howelsen Hill & Mount Werner; Steamboat Ski Resort	Denver	604	Colorado	563
2019	Stowe, VT (Vermont)	Stowe Mountain Resort	Utah	530.5	Vermont	476
2020	Bozeman, MT (Montana State)	Bridger Bowl	Canceled in progress due to the COVID-19 pandemic			
2021	Franconia & Jackson, NH (New Hampshire) (Note: The 2021 championships were originally scheduled for Middlebury College Snow Bowl in Hancock, Vermont, hosted by Middlebury College. The site was changed after Middlebury opted out of all athletic competition in 2020–21 due to continued COVID-19 concerns.)	Cannon Mountain Ski Area & Jackson Nordic Center	Utah	554	Colorado	522.5
2022	Park City, UT (Utah)	Park City Mountain Resort & Soldier Hollow Resort	Utah	578	Vermont	511.5
2023	Lake Placid, NY (St. Lawrence)	Whiteface Mountain & Mount Van Hoevenberg	Utah	526	Colorado	491.5
2024	Steamboat Springs, CO (Colorado)	Howelsen Hill & Mount Werner; Steamboat Ski Resort	Colorado	569.5	Utah	567.5
2025	Lyme Center, NH (Dartmouth)	Dartmouth Skiway & Dartmouth Cross Country Ski Center	Utah	590.0	Colorado	513.0
2026	Park City/Midway, UT (Utah) (Note: The 2026 championships were originally scheduled to be hosted by Montana State. The site was changed due to the lack of snow in the Bozeman area.)	Utah Olympic Park & Soldier Hollow Resort	Utah	549.5	Colorado	539.0

== Titles by team ==
Schools that have won the NCAA Championship
24, 20, 17, 6, 3, 2, 1

Team	Total	Men	Years: Men	Co-ed	Years: Co-ed
Denver	24	14	1954 1955 1956 1957 1961 1962 1963; 1964 1965 1966 1967 1969 1970 1971	10	2000 2001 2002 2005 2008 2009; 2010 2014 2016 2018
Colorado	20	11	1959 1960 1972 1973 1974 1975 1976; 1977 1978 1979 1982	9	1991 1995 1998 1999 2006 2011; 2013 2015 2024
Utah	17	1	1981	16	1983 1984 1986 1987 1988 1993; 1996 1997 2003 2017 2019 2021 2022 2023 2025 2026
Vermont	6	1	1980	5	1989 1990 1992 1994 2012
Dartmouth	3	2	1958 1976	1	2007
Wyoming	2	1	1968	1	1985
New Mexico	1	-		1	2004

== Appearances by team ==
Key

- CH National Champion
- RU National Runner-up
- Numbers indicate the placement of the team in that tournament beyond second
- The 2020 championships were abandoned due to the COVID-19 pandemic, so team appearances are credited, but no placements.

School	Conference	#	10	5	CH	54	55	56	57	58	59	60	61	62	63	64	65	66	67	68	69	70	71	72	73	74	75	76	77	78	79	80	81	82	83	84	85	86	87	88	89	90	91	92	93	94	95	96	97	98	99	00	01	02	03	04	05	06	07	08	09	10	11	12	13	14	15	16	17	18	19	20	21	22	23	24	25	26
Denver	RMISA	58	54	51	24	CH	CH	CH	CH	RU	RU	RU	CH	CH	CH	CH	CH	CH	CH	RU	CH	CH	CH	RU	4	6	5							20	13										12	7	4	RU	4	3	RU	CH	CH	CH	5	3	CH	4	RU	CH	CH	CH	5	6	4	CH	RU	CH	3	CH	5	•	3	3	3	3	4	3
Colorado	RMISA	70	69	66	20	3	4	6	RU	3	CH	CH	3	RU	RU		6			5	5ᴛ	3	RU	CH	CH	CH	CH	CHᴛ	CH	CH	CH	3	3	CH	4	4	5	4	3	3	3	3	CH	5	4	4	CH	4	3	CH	CH	RU	3	RU	3	4	6	CH	3	RU	RU	RU	CH	3	CH	4	CH	RU	RU	RU	3	•	RU	4	RU	CH	RU	RU
Utah	RMISA	63	60	52	17	6	7	7	6		4						RU	5	4				8	16		12	6	5	5	5	RU	RU	CH	3	CH	CH	RU	CH	CH	CH	RU	RU	3	3	CH	RU	RU	CH	CH	RU	4	4	4	3	CH	RU	3	8	4	3	6	4	RU	RU	RU	5	3	3	CH	4	CH	•	CH	CH	CH	RU	CH	CH
Vermont	EISA	60	58	47	6		6	9								8	13			9		10			3	3	RU	3	4	3	3	CH	RU	RU	RU	RU	3	RU	RU	RU	CH	CH	RU	CH	RU	CH	3	3	RU	4	3	3	RU	5	RU	5	RU	5	5	6	5	6	6	CH	3	RU	4	7	5	5	RU	•	6	RU	4	6	5	5
Dartmouth	EISA	70	68	44	3		RU	RU	3	CH	3	3	4	4	3	RU	4		3	3	RU	RU	4	5	6	4	8	CHᴛ	3	4	5	5	8	6	7	6	4	7	8	5	8	5	5	4	6	10	5	8	9	7	6	7	6	7	6	8	5	3	CH	4	7	5	3	4	5	6	6	5	4	3	4	•		11	5	4	3	6
Wyoming	defunct	34	32	27	2	5	8	11	8			4				3	17	3	RU	CH	5ᴛ	4	6	3	RU	RU	3	4	RU	RU	4	7	4	4	3	5	CH	3	4	4	4	4	4	6																																		
New Mexico	defunct	41	37	18	1																										11	11		9	6	3	6	6	5	6	5	6	6	RU	3	3	7	9	8	6	5	5	5	4	4	CH	14	RU	6ᴛ	7	3	3	4	8	6	3	5	6	7	7	6							
Middlebury	EISA	66	59	14	-		3	3		4	7		RU			5	12		6	7	7ᴛ	6	3	4	5	8	9	6	12	7	6	6	5	5	5	8	10	5	6	8	7	7	9	7	8	5	10	6	6	8	8	6	7	11	8	7	8	7	6ᴛ	5	8	10	9	9	10	12	8	11	14	8	10	•		10	10	10	6	7
Western Colorado	defunct	34	18	10	-		13	4	4		5	6		3	4	4	3	RU	5	6	7ᴛ			14	10		7									17	13	17							9	11	6	5	7	12	18	15	14	14	15	16	22	17	18																			
Alaska Anchorage	RMISA	46	40	7	-																												7	7	11	14	8	9	7	7	6	9	7	8	5	6	8	7	5	5	7	10	10	10	9	6	7	6	12	8	4	7	7	5	7	8	9	9	11	9	8	•	4	5	12	7	7	8
Montana State	RMISA	49	32	5	-									7			16	6		10	4					7	11		7	9	8	8	6	8	8	9	9	10								17		16	15	17	15	17	15	16	18	15	13	13	9	16	18	8	10	7	9	9	7	4	6	6	9	•	5	9	6	5	8	4
New Hampshire	EISA	57	43	4	-		5			6			5									7	5	7	9				8	8	9	9	12	12	9	7	7	8	9	11	10	10	10	9	10	8	9	10	11	10	9	8	11	9	10	14	12	9	11	11	9	9	8	10	8	11	11	10	9	11	11	•	9	6	8	8	9	9
Northern Michigan	CCSA	47	26	3	-																	13	10	9	8	5	4	7	6	6	7	4	9	16										10	11	9	11	11	14	13	10	9	8	8	11	12		14	8	10	12	14	12	11	11	7	10	8	8	10	7	•	7	14	19	18	19	13
Fort Lewis	defunct	9	8	3	-												9			4	3	5	7	6	7	13	10																																																			
Idaho	defunct	7	7	3	-	4		5	5		9		7				8							10																																																						
Nevada	RMISA	40	17	2	-	8					6	5		5			7	7			10		11	8		14	12	8		12		13		17	16	13	17	13	14ᴛ								15	12	16	11	11	11	9	6	7	9	9	11	10	9	10	11													18	19ᴛ	15	12
Washington	defunct	12	10	2	-	9	12	8					8			6	5	4	7	8	9	9			12																																																					
St. Lawrence	EISA	45	5	1	-					5									11			11										10	13	10	12	10	14	11	11	9	11	11	11	11	14	14	17ᴛ	23	17	15	14	13	18	18			19	21	20		15ᴛ	18	16	14	15	23	19			17	18	•	13	17	17	17	16ᴛ	19
Notre Dame	defunct	2	2	1	-										5	10																																																														
Seattle	defunct	1	1	1	-	RU																																																																								
Williams	EISA	52	12	-	-		9						9			7	14		8										13	10	10		14	13	10	11	11	12	12	10	9	8	8	12	7	12	13	13	12	16	12	12	12	12	14	13	14	15	15	14	14	12	14	12	12	15	13	14	12	13	19	•			20ᴛ	23	21	21
Alaska	RMISA	45	12	-	-																								9	11			10	15	14	12	12	14	10	12	12			13	16	15	14	17	21	20	21		16ᴛ	13	12	10	15	10	14	12	15ᴛ	15	13	17	14	10	14	13	13	14	15	•	10	7	7	9	10	10
Washington State	defunct	5	4	-	-	7	11	10	7			7																																																																		
Michigan Tech	CCSA	37	3	-	-			12		7	8						15	8					12	11	13						12													14	17		21						16ᴛ	22	20	21	18	19	17	17	17	19	18	21		18	16	17	18	19	16	•	14	12	14ᴛ	13	18	15
Harvard	EISA	25	3	-	-											9	10		9		11																			14				19			17ᴛ						22	20	19	19							17	15	17	14	21	20ᴛ		23	22	•		20	14ᴛ	15	22	16
Westminster (UT)	RMISA	8	3	-	-																																																																		14	•	8	8	9	11	12	14
Bates	EISA	40	2	-	-																									14				19	17	15	16	16	13		16	12	13	15	13	13	12	14	10	9	13	16	13	15	16	20	21	12	13	15	13	16	11	13	16	22	17	19	17	18	20	•				22		
Colby	EISA	34	2	-	-														10																						15	14	16		15					19	23	18	21	17	13	11	11	16	16	13	11	13	15	16	13	13	12	12	10	15	12	•	16	15	16	14	11	11
Montana	defunct	8	2	-	-												11				12	12	9	12	11				10ᴛ	13																																																
New England College	defunct	9	1	-	-																					10								14	15	16	15	15	14ᴛ	15	17																																					
Norwich	defunct	2	1	-	-		10																																16																																							
California	defunct	2	1	-	-			13						6																																																																
Maine	defunct	2	1	-	-								6						12																																																											
Weber State	defunct	2	1	-	-																			13		9																																																				
Johnson State	defunct	2	1	-	-																								10ᴛ																		19																															
Stanford	defunct	1	1	-	-	10																																																																								
Chico State	defunct	1	1	-	-										6																																																															
Michigan State	defunct	1	1	-	-													9																																																												
Air Force	defunct	1	1	-	-																	8																																																								
Saint Michael's	EISA	23	-	-	-																														18					13								18	20	18	17	19		21							20	21		19	20	19	18	15	15	12	13			13	11	12	13	20
Green Bay	CCSA	22	-	-	-																																							17	19		16	15	13	14	16	14	20		21	22	20	22	22	20	19	17	19					20ᴛ			24	•		22				
Bowdoin	EISA	16	-	-	-																																										20	20	19					23											21	20	23		20	21	17	•		16	20ᴛ	16	16ᴛ	17
St. Scholastica	CCSA	16	-	-	-																																																							19	22			18	19	17	15	18	19	22	23	•	15	18	20ᴛ		23	22
St. Olaf	CCSA	12	-	-	-																																						12	16				19		22	22	20	19	19				23	21							16	22											
Plymouth State	EISA	12	-	-	-																																																													21	20	16	16	16	21	•	11	19	13	21	20	
Boston College	EISA	7	-	-	-																																																																	20		•	12	21		19ᴛ	14	18
Boise State	defunct	5	-	-	-																					11	13																													17	16	20																				
Whitman	defunct	5	-	-	-																																																			18	17	18	19	21																		
Gustavus Adolphus	defunct	5	-	-	-																																																					24		18	21	22	21															
Keene State	defunct	4	-	-	-																																	18			13	13	15																																			
UMass	defunct	4	-	-	-																																								18	18		21	18																													
Colby–Sawyer	EISA	3	-	-	-																																													21														20					21									
Alaska Pacific	defunct	2	-	-	-																			15	14																																																					
Minnesota Duluth	defunct	2	-	-	-																										13			11																																												
Minnesota	defunct	2	-	-	-																											12	11																																													
Castleton	defunct	2	-	-	-																																				14			18																																		
Wisconsin	defunct	2	-	-	-																																						14			16																																
Clarkson	defunct	2	-	-	-																																														20																						17					
Maine–Presque Isle	defunct	2	-	-	-																																																										20		18													
Northern Arizona	defunct	1	-	-	-																	14																																																								
Oregon	defunct	1	-	-	-																					15																																																				
Lyndon State	defunct	1	-	-	-																													18																																												
Cornell	defunct	1	-	-	-																																18																																									
MIT	defunct	1	-	-	-																																					15																																				
Saint Mary's (MN)	defunct	1	-	-	-																																								20																																	
Carleton	defunct	1	-	-	-																																											22																														
Babson	defunct	1	-	-	-																																														19																											
St. Cloud State	CCSA	1	-	-	-																																																		22																							
Whitworth	defunct	1	-	-	-																																																		17																							
Wellesley	defunct	1	-	-	-																																																									20																

== Individual Winners ==
=== Women's Alpine ===
YEAR	Giant Slalom	YEAR	Slalom
1983	Kathy Kreiner, Utah	1983	Asa Svedmark, Wyoming
1984	Bente Dahlum, Utah	1984	Bente Dahlum, Utah
1985	Ann Melander, Wyoming	1985	Ann Melander, Wyoming
1986	Lynda McGehee, Colorado	1986	Gabriella Hamberg, Vermont
1987	Vibeke Hoff, Utah	1987	Eva Pfosi, Dartmouth
1988	Anouk Patty, Dartmouth	1988	Gabriella Hamberg, Vermont
1989	Anke Friedrich, Utah	1989	Gabriella Hamberg, Vermont
1990	Anke Friedrich, Utah	1990	Anke Friedrich, Utah
1991	Keri Schlopy, Vermont	1991	Heather Flood, Middlebury
1992	Sally Knight, Vermont	1992	Katja Lesjak, Utah
1993	Karianne Eriksen, Utah	1993	Gibson LaFountaine, Vermont
1994	Christl Hager, Utah	1994	Gibson LaFountaine, Vermont
1995	Christl Hager, Utah	1995	Narcisa Sehovic, Denver
1996	Jennifer Collins, Dartmouth	1996	Roberta Pergher, Denver
1997	Christl Hager, Utah	1997	Roberta Pergher, Denver
1998	Caroline Gedde-Dahl, Colorado	1998	Brooke Laundon, Middlebury
1999	Aimee-Noel Hartley, Colorado	1999	Linda Wikstrom, Colorado
2000	Aimee-Noel Hartley, Colorado	2000	Cecilie Hagen Larsen, Denver
2001	Erica MacConnell, Vermont	2001	Petra Svet, Utah
2002	Aurore De Maulmont, Alas. Anchorage	2002	Marte Dolve, New Mexico
2003	Jamie Kingsbury, Vermont	2003	Lina Johansson, Utah
2004	Jennifer Delich, New Mexico	2004	Pia Rivelsrud, Denver
2005	Jamie Kingsbury, Vermont	2005	Megan Hughes, Middlebury
2006	Abbi Lathrop, Colby	2006	Lucie Zikova, Colorado
2007	Sarah Schaedler, Western	2007	Malin Hemmingsson, New Mexico
2008	Lucie Zikova, Colorado	2008	Lucie Zikova, Colorado
2009	Lindsay Cone, St. Lawrence	2009	Malin Hemmingsson, New Mexico
2010	Eva Huckova, Utah	2010	Malin Hemmingsson, New Mexico
2011	Ida Dillingoen, Denver	2011	Sterling Grant, Denver
2012	Rebecca Nadler, Harvard	2012	Kate Ryley, Vermont
2013	Kristine Gjelsten Haugen, Denver	2013	Kristine Gjelsten Haugen, Denver
2014	Kristine Gjelsten Haugen, Denver	2014	Kristina Riis-Johannessen, Vermont
2015	Mateja Robnik, New Mexico	2015	Monica Huebner, Denver
2016	Kristine Gjelsten Haugen, Denver	2016	Julie Flo Mohagen, Utah
2017	Benedicte Lyche, Montana State	2017	Paula Moltzan, Vermont
2018	Amelia Smart, Denver	2018	Amelia Smart, Denver
2019	Laurence St. Germain, Vermont	2019	Laurence St. Germain, Vermont
2020	Storm Klomhaus, Denver	2020	cancelled
2021	Cassidy Gray, Colorado	2021	Amelia Smart, Denver
2022	Magdalena Luczak, Colorado	2022	Katie Hensien, Denver
2023	Madison Hoffman, Utah	2023	Madison Hoffman, Utah
2024	Magdalena Luczak, Colorado	2024	Magdalena Luczak, Colorado
2025	Sara Rask, Denver	2025	Sara Rask, Denver
2026	Justine Lamontagne, Montana State	2026	Justine Lamontagne, Montana State

- 4 wins: Kristine Gjelsten Haugen (GS: 2013, 2014, 2016; SL: 2013). 8 All American honors (4x1st, 2x3rd, 1x5th and 1x6th).
- 3 wins: Malin Hemmingsson (SL: 2007, 2009, 2010); Anke Friedrich (GS: 1989, 1990; SL: 1990); Christl Hager (GS: 1994, 1995, 1997); Lucie Zikova (GS: 2008; SL: 2006, 2008); Amelia Smart (GS: 2018; SL: 2018, 2021); Magdalena Luczak (GS: 2022, 2024; SL: 2024).
- 9 sweeps (GS and SL in same year): Bente Dahlum (1984), Anke Friedrich (1990), Lucie Zikova (2008), Kristine Gjelsten Haugen (2013), Amelia Smart (2018), and Laurence St. Germain (2019), Madison Hoffman (2023), Magdalena Luczak (2024), Sara Rask (2025), Justine Lamontagne (2026).

=== Men's Alpine ===
Year	Slalom	Downhill	Combined
1954	John L'Orange, Denver	Pat Myers, Nevada	not awarded
1955	Chiharu Igaya, Dartmouth	Chiharu Igaya, Dartmouth	Chiharu Igaya, Dartmouth
1956	Chiharu Igaya, Dartmouth	Walt Taulbee, Washington	Chiharu Igaya, Dartmouth
1957	Chiharu Igaya, Dartmouth	Ralph Miller, Dartmouth	Ralph Miller, Dartmouth
1958	Robert Gebhardt, Dartmouth	Garry Vaughn, Norwich	Dave Vorse, Dartmouth
1959	Marvin Melville, Utah	Marvin Melville, Utah	Marvin Melville, Utah
1960	Rudy Ruana, Montana	Dave Butts, Colorado	Jim Gaddis, Utah
1961	Buddy Werner, Colorado	Gordi Eaton, Middlebury	Buddy Werner, Colorado
1962	Jim Gaddis, Utah	Myke Baar, Denver	Jim Gaddis, Utah
1963	Jimmie Heuga, Colorado	Dave Gorsuch, Western State; Bill Marolt, Colorado; Buddy Werner, Colorado	Buddy Werner, Colorado
1964	John Clough, Middlebury	John Clough, Middlebury	John Clough, Middlebury
1965	Rick Chaffee, Denver	Bill Marolt, Colorado	Rick Chaffee, Denver
1966	Bill Marolt, Colorado	Terje Overland, Denver	Bill Marolt, Colorado
1967	Rick Chaffee, Denver	Dennis McCoy, Denver	Terje Overland, Denver
1968	Dennis McCoy, Denver	Barney Peet, Fort Lewis	Dennis McCoy, Denver
1969	Paul Rachetto, Denver	Mike Lafferty, Colorado	Paul Rachetto, Denver
1970	Mike Porcarelli, Colorado	Otto Tschudi, Denver	Mike Porcarelli, Colorado
1971	Otto Tschudi, Denver	Otto Tschudi, Denver	Otto Tschudi, Denver
1972	Mike Porcarelli, Colorado	Otto Tschudi, Denver	Mike Porcarelli, Colorado
1973	Peik Christensen, Denver	Bob Cochran, Vermont	Peik Christensen, Denver
1974	Bill Shaw, Boise State	Larry Kennison, Wyoming	Peik Christensen, Denver
1975	Peik Christensen, Denver	Mark Ford, Colorado	Mark Ford, Colorado

Year	Slalom	Giant Slalom	Combined
1976	Mike Meleski, Wyoming	Dave Cleveland, Dartmouth	Mike Meleski, Wyoming

Year	Slalom	Giant Slalom
1977	Stephen Hienzsch, Colorado	Stephen Hienzsch, Colorado
1978	Dan Brelsford, Montana State	Dale Merrill, Wyoming
1979	Per Nicolaysen, Utah	Chris Mikell, Vermont
1980	Bret Williams, Northern Mich.	John Teague, Vermont
1981	Scott Hoffman, Utah	Tor Melander, Vermont
1982	Tiger Shaw, Dartmouth	Seth Bayer, Colorado
1983	Niklas Scherrer, Colorado	Tor Melander, Vermont
1984	James Marceau, Colorado	Andrew Shaw, Vermont
1985	Jeff Durtschi, Utah	Tom Foote, Dartmouth
1986	John Skajem, Colorado	Miles deChamp, Dartmouth
1987	John Skajem, Colorado	John Skajem, Colorado
1988	Dean Keller, Vermont	Tom Foote, Dartmouth
1989	Robert MacLeod, Middlebury	Ian Witter, Colorado
1990	Chris Pederson, Colorado	Einar Bohmer, Vermont
1991	Einar Bohmer, Vermont	Toni Standteiner, Colorado
1992	Einar Bohmer, Vermont	Eric Archer, Colorado
1993	Mark Bonnell, Utah	Sean Ramsden, Colorado
1994	Louis-Francois Gagnon, Utah	Erik Roland, Denver
1995	Scott Wither, Colorado	Bryan Sax, Colorado
1996	Mattias Erlandsson, New Mexico	Andrew Hare, Utah
1997	Izidor Jerman, Alas. Anchorage	Brandon Dyksterhouse, Vermont
1998	Christian Hutter, Denver	David Viele, Dartmouth
1999	Jayme Smithers, Denver	David Viele, Dartmouth
2000	Andy LeRoy, Colorado	Matthew Knittle, Vermont
2001	Jernej Bukovec, Utah	John Minahan, Vermont
2002	Roger Brown, Dartmouth	Tommi Viirret, Nevada
2003	Bradley Wall, Dartmouth	Ben Thornhill, Utah
2004	Paul McDonald, Dartmouth	Ben Thornhill, Utah
2005	David Chodounsky, Dartmouth	Greg Hardy, Vermont
2006	Karl Johnson, Dartmouth	Scott Veenis, Utah
2007	Adam Cole, Denver	Adam Cole, Denver
2008	John Buchar, Denver	John Buchar, Denver
2009	Gabriel Rivas, Colorado	David Donaldson, Vermont
2010	Andreas Adde, Alas. Anchorage	Leif Kristian Haugen, Denver
2011	Tim Kelley, Vermont	Seppi Stiegler, Denver
2012	Espen Lysdahl, Denver	Adam Zika, Colorado
2013	Joonas Rasanen, New Mexico	Jonathan Nordbotten, Vermont
2014	Espen Lysdahl, Denver	Mark Engel, Utah
2015	Dominique Garand, Vermont	Robert Cone, Middlebury
2016	Erik Read, Denver	Endre Bjertness, Utah
2017	David Ketterer, Colorado	David Ketterer, Colorado
2018	Tanguy Nef, Dartmouth	Brian McLaughlin, Dartmouth
2019	Jett Seymour, Denver	Tanguy Nef, Dartmouth
2020	Tobias Kogler, Denver	cancelled
2021	Mathias Tefre, Vermont	Mikkel Solbakken, Westminster
2022	Mathias Tefre, Vermont	Filip Forejtek, Colorado
2023	Mathias Tefre, Vermont	Filip Forejtek, Colorado
2024	Filip Wahlqvist, Colorado	Mikkel Solbakken, Utah
2025	Jayden Buckrell, New Hampshire	Johs Herland, Utah
2026	Oscar Zimmer, Dartmouth	Johs Herland, Utah

- 6 wins - Chiharu Igaya (1955–57)
- 5 wins - Otto Tschudi (1970–72)
- 4 wins - Buddy Werner (1961–63), Bill Marolt (1961–63), Mike Porcarelli (1970–72), Peik Christensen (1973–75)

Alpine Sweep (9): Chiharu Igaya (1955), Marvin Melville (1959), Joch Clough (1964), Otto Tschudi (1971), Stephen Heinzsch (1977), John Skajem (1987), Adam Cole (2007), John Buchar (2008), David Ketterer (2017)

=== Men's Nordic ===
Cross Country		Jumping		Nordic Combined	
1954	Marvin Crawford, Denver	1954	Willis Olson, Denver	not awarded	
1955	Larry Damon, Vermont	1955	Willis Olson, Denver	1955	Eirik Berggren, Idaho
1956	Eirik Berggren, Idaho	1956	Willis Olson, Denver	1956	Eirik Berggren, Idaho
1957	Mack Miller, Western State	1957	Alf Vincelette, Denver	1957	Harol Riiber, Denver
1958	Clarence Servold, Denver	1958	Oddvar Rønnestad, Denver	1958	Clarence Servold, Denver
1959	Clarence Servold, Denver	1959	Dave Butts, Colorado	1959	Ted Farwell, Denver
1960	John Dendahl, Colorado	1960	Dag Helgestad, Washington State	1960	John Dendahl, Colorado
1961	Charlie Akers, Maine	1961	Chris Selbekk, Denver	1961	John Bower, Middlebury
1962	Jim Page, Dartmouth	1962	Oyvind Floystad, Denver	1962	Tor Fageraas, Montana State
1963	Eddie Demers, Western State	1963	Ole Tom Nord, Washington	1963	Aarne Valkama, Denver
1964	Eddie Demers, Western State	1964	Frithjof Prydz, Utah; Erik Jansen, Denver	1964	Erik Jansen, Denver
1965	Mike Elliott, Fort Lewis	1965	Erik Jansen, Denver	1965	Matz Jenssen, Utah
1966	Mike Elliott, Fort Lewis	1966	Frithjof Prydz, Utah	1966	Frithjof Prydz, Utah
1967	Ned Gillette, Dartmouth	1967	Bjorn Loken, Utah	1967	Matz Jenssen, Utah
1968	Clark Matis, Colorado	1968	Peter Robes, Wyoming	1968	Jim Miller, Fort Lewis
1969	Clark Matis, Colorado	1969	Odd Hammernes, Denver	1969	Greg Krog, Denver
1970	Ole Hansen, Denver	1970	Jay Rand, Colorado	1970	Jim Miller, Fort Lewis
1971	Ole Hansen, Denver	1971	Vidar Nilsgard, Colorado	1971	Bruce Cunningham, New Hampshire
1972	Stale Engen, Wyoming	1972	Odd Hammernes, Denver	1972	Bruce Cunningham, New Hampshire
1973	Steiner Hybertsen, Wyoming	1973	Vidar Nilsgard, Colorado	1973	Pertti Reijula, Northern Michigan
1974	Steiner Hybertsen, Wyoming	1974	Didrik Ellefsen, Colorado	1974	Stig Hallingbye, Wyoming
1975	Steiner Hybertsen, Wyoming	1975	Didrik Ellefsen, Colorado	1975	Stig Hallingbye, Wyoming
1976	Stan Dunklee, Vermont	1976	Kip Sundgaard, Utah	1976	Jack Turner, Colorado
1977	Helge Aamodt, Colorado	1977	Ron Steele, Utah	Discontinued	
1978	Sigurd Kjerpseth, Colorado	1978	Tom Jolman Jensen, Colorado; Kare Herje, Vermont	Discontinued	
1979	Svein Arne Osen, Utah	1979	Roger Holden, Vermont	Discontinued	
1980	Pal Sjulstad, Vermont	1980	Jorn Stromberg, Wyoming	Discontinued	
Men's Cross Country		Men's Relay			
1981	Bernt Lund, Utah	1981	Vermont (John Zdechilk, Todd Kempainen, Pal Sjulstad)		
1982	Egil Nilssen, Colorado	1982	Colorado (Thomas Holter, Bjorn Gjelsten, Egil Nilssen)		
1983	Rune Helland, Wyoming	1983	Vermont (Fredrik Thaulow, Todd Boonstra, Pal Sjulsted)		
1984	John Aalberg, Utah	1984	Utah (Bernt Lund, Knut Engebretsen, John Aalberg)		
1985	John Aalberg, Utah	1985	Vermont (Bruce Likely, George Welk, Todd Boonstra)		
1986	Hans-Martin Sjulstad, Utah	1986	Utah (Osmond Driveness, Erik Baumann, Hans-Martin Sjulstad)		
1987	Osmund Drivenes, Utah	1987	Utah (Osmond Driveness, Erik Baumann, Hans-Martin Sjulstad)		
1988	Per Kare Jakobsen, Colorado	1988	Colorado (Ric Schaff, Aage Schanning, Per Kare Jakobsen)		

Men's Freestyle		Men's Classical	
1989	Per Jakobsen, Colorado (20)	1989	Hans Sjulstad, Utah (10)
1990	Tim Miller, Vermont (20)	1990	Luke Bodensteiner, Utah (10)
1991	Björn Svensson, Colorado (10)	1991	Stig Mattsson, Alaska Anchorage (20)
1992	Bernie Lafleur, Wyoming (10)	1992	Trond Nystad, Vermont (20)
1993	Peter Vordenberg, Northern Michigan (20)	1993	Luke Bodensteiner, Utah (10)
1994	Niklas Skoglund, New Mexico (20)	1994	Håvard Solbakken, Utah (10)
1995	Havard Solbakken, Utah (10)	1995	Thomas Weman, Utah (20)
1996	Thorodd Bakken, Vermont (10)	1996	Geir Skari, Denver (20)
1997	Thorodd Bakken, Vermont (20)	1997	Frode Lillefjell, Alaska Anchorage (10)
1998	Thorodd Bakken, Vermont (20)	1998	Thorodd Bakken, Vermont (10)
1999	Rune Kollerud, Utah (10)	1999	Ove Erik Tronvoll, Colorado (20)
2000	Pietro Broggini, Denver (10)	2000	Pietro Broggini, Denver (20)
2001	Pietro Broggini, Denver (20)	2001	Wolf Wallendorf, Denver (10)
2002	Ola Berger, Denver (20)	2002	Ola Berger, Denver (10)
2003	Jimmy Vika, New Mexico (10)	2003	Christopher Cook, Northern Michigan (20)
2004	Henning Dybendel, Utah (10)	2004	Henning Dybendal, Utah (20)
2005	Rene Reisshauer, Denver (10)	2005	Rene Reisshauer, Denver (20)
2006	Kit Richmond, Colorado (20)	2006	John Stene, Denver (10)
2007	Rene Reisshauer, Denver (10)	2007	Snorri Einarsson, Utah (20)
2008	Glenn Randall, Dartmouth (10)	2008	Marius Korthauer, Alaska Fairbanks (20)
2009	Vegard Kjoelhamar, Colorado (20)	2009	Juergen Uhl, Vermont (10)
2010	Franz Bernstein, Vermont (20)	2010	Matt Gelso, Colorado (10)
2011	Sam Tarling, Dartmouth (10)	2011	Reid Pletcher, Colorado (20)
2012	Erik Soderman, Northern Michigan (10)	2012	Miles Havlick, Utah (20)
2013	Miles Havlick, Utah (20)	2013	Rune Oedegaard, Colorado (10)
2014	Mads Stroem, Colorado (20)	2014	Rune Oedegaard, Colorado (10)
2015	Patrick Caldwell, Dartmouth (10)	2015	Fredrik Schwencke, Northern Michigan (20)
2016	Mads Stroem, Colorado (10)	2016	Mads Stroem, Colorado (20)
2017	Martin Bergström, Utah (20)	2017	Martin Bergström, Utah (10)
2018	Ian Torchia, Northern Michigan (20)	2018	Martin Bergström, Utah (10)
2019	Erik Dengerud, Colorado (10)	2019	Ricardo Izquierdo-Bernier, New Mexico (20)
2020	Ben Ogden, Vermont (10)	2020	cancelled
2021	Magnus Bøe, Colorado (20)	2021	Magnus Bøe, Colorado (10)
2022	Ben Ogden, Vermont (20)	2022	Ben Ogden, Vermont (10)
2023	Joe Davies, Alaska Fairbanks (10)	2023	Remi Drolet, Harvard (20)
2024	John Steel Hagenbuch, Dartmouth (7.5)	2024	Magnus Boee, Colorado (20)
2025	Joe Davies, Utah (20)	2025	John Steel Hagenbuch, Dartmouth (7.5)
2026	Mons Melbye, Utah (20)	2026	John Steel Hagenbuch, Dartmouth (7.5)

4 Wins - Thorodd Bakken, Vermont (1996–98)
Nordic Sweeps: Egil Nilssen (1982), John Aalberg (1984), Hans Martin Sjulstad (1986), Osmund Driveness (1987), Per Kare Jakobsen (1988), Thorod Bakken (1998), Pietro Broggini (2000), Ola Berger (2002), Henning Dybendel (2004), Rene Reisshauer (2005), Mads Stroem (2016), Martin Bergström (2017), Magnus Bøe (2021), Ben Ogden (2022)

=== Women's Nordic ===
Women's Cross Country		Women's Relay	
1983	Beth Heiden, Vermont	1983	New Mexico (Wenche Hokholt, Kjersti Stenerg, Heidi Sorensen)
1984	Heidi Sorensen, New Mexico	1984	Vermont (Besty Haines, Joanne Conchieri, Jorunn Gran-Henriksen)
1985	Kristen Petty, Colorado	1985	Wyoming (Grethe-Lise Hagensen, Goril Staf, Hege Peikli-Randall)
1986	Hanne Krogstad, Vermont	1986	Colorado (Ingrid Butts, Jill Anderson, Kristen Petty)
1987	Kristen Petty, Colorado	1987	Vermont (Erika MacDonald, Brenda White, Hanne Krogstad)
1988	Brenda White, Vermont	1988	Vermont (Selma Lie, Laura Wilson, Brenda White)
Women's Freestyle		Women's Classical	
1989	Sari Argillander, Vermont (15)	1989	Sari Argillander, Vermont (5)
1990	Laura Wilson, Vermont (15)	1990	Laura Wilson, Vermont (5)
1991	Laura Wilson, Vermont (5)	1991	Laura Wilson, Vermont (15)
1992	Anette Skjolden, Colorado (5)	1992	Kristin Vestgren, Utah (15)
1993	Ivana Radlova, New Mexico (15)	1993	Anette Skjolden, Colorado (5)
1994	Nina Hamilton, Vermont (15)	1994	Minna Turvo, Alaska Anchorage (5)
1995	Heidi Selnes, Utah (5)	1995	Heidi Selnes, Utah (15)
1996	Lisbeth Johnson, Denver (5)	1996	Lisbeth Johnson, Denver (15)
1997	Amy Crawford, Western State (15)	1997	Doris Hausleitner, Alaska Anchorage (5)
1998	Line Selnes, Colorado (15)	1998	Line Selnes, Colorado (5)
1999	Ekaterina Ivanova, Vermont (5)	1999	Britta Wienand, Denver (15)
2000	Katerina Hanusova, Colorado* (5)	2000	Kristina Strandberg, New Mexico (15)
2001	Katerina Hanusova, Nevada (15)	2001	Katerina Hanusova, Nevada (5)
2002	Katerina Hanusova, Nevada (15)	2002	Mari Storeng, Colorado (5)
2003	Katrin Šmigun, Utah (5)	2003	Katrin Šmigun, Utah (15)
2004	Sigrid Aas, Alaska Fairbanks (5)	2004	Sigrid Aas, Alaska Fairbanks (15)
2005	Mandy Kaempf, Alaska Anchorage (5)	2005	Mandy Kaempf, Alaska Anchorage (15)
2006	Jana Rehemaa, Colorado (15)	2006	Jana Rehemaa, Colorado (5)
2007	Lindsey Williams, Northern Michigan (5)	2007	Lindsey Weier, Northern Michigan (15)
2008	Maria Grevsgaard, Colorado (5)	2008	Maria Grevsgaard, Colorado (15)
2009	Antje Maempel, Denver (15)	2009	Antje Maempel, Denver (5)
2010	Antje Maempel, Denver (15)	2010	Antje Maempel, Denver (5)
2011	Maria Graefnings, Utah (5)	2011	Eliska Hajkova, Colorado (15)
2012	Maria Graefnings, Utah (5)	2012	Amy Glen, Vermont (15)
2013	Joanne Reid, Colorado (15)	2013	Anja Gruber, Vermont (5)
2014	Eva Severus, New Mexico (15)	2014	Anja Gruber, Vermont (5)
2015	Veronkica Mayerhofer, Utah (5)	2015	Emilie Cedervaern, New Mexico (15)
2016	Anika Miller, Montana State (5)	2016	Linn Eriksen, Denver (15)
2017	Petra Hyncicova, Colorado (15)	2017	Petra Hyncicova, Colorado (5)
2018	Katharine Ogden, Dartmouth (15)	2018	Katharine Ogden, Dartmouth (5)
2019	Julia Richter, Utah (5)	2019	Katharine Ogden, Dartmouth (15)
2020	Eveliina Piippo, Denver (5)	2020	cancelled
2021	Sydney Palmer-Leger, Utah (15)	2021	Sydney Palmer-Leger, Utah (5)
2022	Sophia Laukli, Utah (15)	2022	Novie McCabe, Utah (5)
2023	Novie McCabe, Utah (5)	2023	Novie McCabe, Utah (20)
2024	Sydney Palmer-Leger, Utah (7.5)	2024	Jasmine Drolet, Dartmouth (20)
2025	Kendall Kramer, Alaska Fairbanks (20)	2025	Erica Lavén, Utah (7.5)
2026	Rosie Fordham, Alaska Fairbanks (20)	2026	Rosie Fordham, Alaska Fairbanks (7.5)

4 Wins - Laura Wilson (1990–91), Katerina Hanusova, 2000–02), Antje Maempel (2009–10)
Nordic Sweeps: Brenda White (1988), Sari Argillander (1989), Laura Wilson (1990, 1991), Heidi Selnes (1995), Lisbeth Johnson (1996), Line Selnes (1998), Katerina Hanusova (2000), Mandy Kaempf (2005), Jana Rehemaa (2006), Maria Grevsgaard (2008), Antje Maempel (2009, 2010), Petra Hyncicova (2017), Katharine Ogden (2018), Sydney Palmer-Leger (2021), Novie McCabe (2023), Rosie Fordham (2026)

=== Men's combined ===
All four events (cross country, downhill, jumping, slalom)

YEAR	Skimeister
1954	Marvin Crawford, Denver
1955	Les Streeter, Middlebury
1956	John Cress, Denver
1957	Ralph Miller, Dartmouth
1958	Dave Harwood, Dartmouth
1959	Dave Butts, Colorado
1960	John Dendahl, Colorado
1961	Art Brookstrom, Dartmouth
1962	Jim Page, Dartmouth
1963	Jim Page, Dartmouth
1964	Jennings Cress, Western State
1965	Loris Werner, Western State
1966	Loris Werner, Western State
1967	Matz Jenssen, Utah
1968	Eric Piene, Wyoming
1969	Ed Damon, Dartmouth
1970	John Kendall, New Hampshire

== Hosts ==
=== Host sites, by school (Includes co-hosts) ===
Team	Hosted	Years
Air Force	1	1959
Alaska Anchorage	2	1987, 2002
Bates	3	1976, 1999, 2009
California	1	1962
Colby	1	1994
Colorado	10	1956, 1972, 1977, 1979, 1993, 2006, 2010, 2016, 2018, 2024
Dartmouth	5	1958, 1964, 1970, 2003, 2025
Denver	2	1956, 1959
Fort Lewis	1	1975
Middlebury	6	1961, 1973, 1988, 2001, 2005, 2013
Montana State	8	1960, 1983, 1985, 1996, 1998, 2008, 2012, 2020
Nevada	3	1954, 1962, 2004
New Hampshire	7	1978, 1984, 1992, 1995, 2007, 2017, 2021
Norwich	1	1955
St. Lawrence	3	1982, 2015, 2023
Utah	8	1957, 1963, 1981, 1991, 2000, 2014, 2022, 2026
Utah State	1	1957
Vermont	5	1986, 1990, 1997, 2011, 2019
Washington	1	1965
Western State	1	1959
Wyoming	2	1974, 1989

- Non-School Hosts: 1966–69, 1971, 1980, 1983

=== Host sites, by location ===
Site	Hosted	Years
Steamboat Springs, Colorado	9	1968, 1969, 1979, 1993, 2006, 2010, 2016, 2018, 2024
Bozeman, Montana	8	1960, 1983, 1985, 1996, 1998, 2008, 2012, 2020
Hancock, Vermont	6	1961, 1973, 1988, 2001, 2005, 2013
Stowe, Vermont	6	1980, 1986, 1990, 1997, 2011, 2019
Park City, Utah	6	1981, 1991, 2000, 2014, 2022, 2026
Franconia, New Hampshire	5	1964, 1970, 1978, 2017 (alpine only), 2021 (alpine only)
Winter Park, Colorado	4	1956, 1959, 1972, 1977
Pinkham Notch, New Hampshire	4	1984, 1992, 1995, 2007
(New York (state)) Lake Placid, New York	4	1980, 1982, 2015, 2023
Lyme Center, New Hampshire	3	1958, 2003, 2025
Newry, Maine	3	1976, 1999, 2009
Jackson, New Hampshire	2	2017, 2021 (Nordic only for both)
Girdwood, Alaska	2	1987, 2002
Carrabassett Valley, Maine	2	1967, 1994
Teton Village, Wyoming	2	1974, 1989
Truckee, California	1	2004
Durango, Colorado	1	1975
Lead, South Dakota	1	1971
Crested Butte, Colorado	1	1966
(Washington (state)) Seattle-Tacoma, Washington	1	1965
Big Cottonwood Canyon, Utah	1	1963
Olympic Valley, California	1	1962
Huntsville, Utah	1	1957
Northfield, Vermont	1	1955
Reno, Nevada	1	1954

== Individual events ==
=== Current events ===
Cross-Country events

- 20-Kilometer Freestyle, Men
- 10-Kilometer Freestyle, Men
- 15-Kilometer Freestyle, Women
- 5-Kilometer Freestyle, Women
- 10-Kilometer Classical, Men
- 20-Kilometer Classical, Men
- 5-Kilometer Classical, Women
- 15-Kilometer Classical, Women

Downhill Events

- Men's Slalom (1954–present)
- Women's Slalom (1983–present)
- Men's Giant Slalom (1976–present)
- Women's Giant Slalom (1983–present)

=== Discontinued events ===
Cross-country events

- Cross-country, Men (1954–1988)
- Cross-country, Women (1983–1988)
- Cross-country relay, Men (1983–1988)
- Cross-country relay, Women (1983–1988)

Alpine events

- Alpine combined, Men (1955–1976)
- Downhill, Men (1954–1975)

Other events

- Nordic combined, Men (1955–1976)
- Ski jumping, Men (1954–1980)
- Skimeister, Men (1954–1973)

== Individual Championships ==
- Results through 2025-2026 Season

Team	Titles
Colorado	105
Denver	98
Utah	92
Vermont	71
Dartmouth	47
Wyoming	19
New Mexico	16
Middlebury	11
Alaska–Anchorage	9
Northern Michigan	9
Western Colorado (Western State)	9
New Hampshire	7
Montana State	6
Alaska	6
Fort Lewis	5
Nevada	5
Idaho	3
Washington	2
Harvard	2
Boise State	1
Colby	1
Maine	1
Montana	1
Norwich	1
St. Lawrence	1
Washington State	1
Westminster (UT)	1

== Championships by coach ==
- Results through 2025-2026 season, no team title awarded in 2020 due to COVID-19 pandemic in the United States

Coach	Team	Titles
Willy Schaeffler	Denver	13
Pat Miller	Utah	9
Richard Rokos	Colorado	8
Bill Marolt	Colorado	7
Andy LeRoy	Denver	6
Fredrik Landstedt	Utah	6
Kurt Smitz	Denver	4
Chip LaCasse	Vermont	3
Bob Beattie	Colorado	2
Tim Hinderman	Colorado	2
Kevin Sweeney	Utah	2
Tim Ameel	Wyoming	1
George Brooks	New Mexico	1
John Cress	Wyoming	1
Ian Lockhead	Colorado	1
Al Merrill	Dartmouth	1
Jim Page	Dartmouth	1
Peder Pytte	Denver	1
Jana Weinberger	Colorado	1

== See also ==
- List of NCAA skiing programs
- AIAW Intercollegiate Women's Skiing Champions
- Pre-NCAA Intercollegiate Skiing Champions
