= 1968 NCAA skiing championships =

American college skiing competition

Coordinates: 40.459°N 106.803°W

1968 NCAA Skiing Championships

Tournament information
- Sport: College skiing
- Location: Steamboat Springs, Colorado
- Dates: March 21–23, 1968
- Administrator: NCAA
- Venue(s): Mount Werner, Howelsen Hill (jumping)
- Teams: 10
- Number of events: 4 (7 titles)

Final positions
- Champions: Wyoming (1st title)
- 1st runners-up: Denver
- 2nd runners-up: Dartmouth

The 1968 NCAA Skiing Championships were contested at Mount Werner ski area near Steamboat Springs, Colorado, at the fifteenth annual NCAA-sanctioned ski tournament to determine the individual and team national champions of men's collegiate alpine skiing, cross-country skiing, and ski jumping in the United States.

Wyoming, coached by John Cress, captured their first national championship, edging out seven-time defending champion Denver by less than eight points in the team standings. The previous year, Wyoming was runner-up by less than one point.

== Venue ==
This year's championships were held March 21–23 in Colorado at Mount Werner ski area in Steamboat Springs. The jumping event was at Howelsen Hill.

These were the fourth championships in Colorado, and the first at Steamboat Springs. Winter Park hosted the state's first two (1956, 1959), followed by Crested Butte in 1966.

Mount Werner was sold in 1969 and rebranded as "Steamboat" in 1970.

== Team scoring ==
Location in the United States

Rank	Team	Points
1st place, gold medalist(s)	Wyoming	383.9
2nd place, silver medalist(s)	Denver	376.2
3rd place, bronze medalist(s)	Dartmouth	369.5
4	Fort Lewis	369.1
5	Colorado	365.3
6	Western State	360.0
7	Middlebury	348.6
8	Washington	320.4
9	Vermont	306.5
10	Montana State	299.7

== Individual events ==
Location in Colorado

Four events were held, which yielded seven individual titles.

- Thursday: Slalom
- Friday: Downhill, Cross Country
- Saturday: Jumping

Event	Champion		
Event	Skier	Team	Time/Score
Alpine	Dennis McCoy	Denver	3:14.7
Cross Country	Clark Matis	Colorado	53:19
Downhill	Barney Peet	Fort Lewis	1:37.30
Jumping	Peter Robes	Wyoming	221.2
Nordic	Jim Miller	Fort Lewis	7:09.4
Skimeister	Eric Piene	Wyoming	338.8
Slalom	Dennis McCoy	Denver	1:36.32

== See also ==
- List of NCAA skiing programs
