= 1970 NCAA Skiing Championships =

American college skiing competition

Coordinates: 44.177°N 71.701°W

Tournament information
- Sport: College skiing
- Location: (New Hampshire) Franconia, New Hampshire
- Dates: March 4–7, 1970
- Administrator: NCAA
- Venue: Cannon Mountain Ski Area
- Teams: 14
- Number of events: 4 events (7 titles)

Final positions
- Champions: Denver (13th title)
- 1st runners-up: Dartmouth
- 2nd runners-up: Colorado

The 1970 NCAA Skiing Championships were contested at the Cannon Mountain Ski Area in Franconia, New Hampshire, at the seventeenth annual NCAA-sanctioned ski tournament to determine the individual and team national champions of men's collegiate alpine skiing, cross-country skiing, and ski jumping in the United States.

Denver, coached by Willy Schaeffler, captured their thirteenth national championship and ninth in ten years. Denver finished 7.8 points ahead of runners-up Dartmouth in the team standings, the second straight year the Pioneers bested the Big Green.

== Venue ==
This year's NCAA skiing championships were held March 4–7 in New Hampshire at Cannon Mountain Ski Area near Franconia.

The seventeenth edition, these were the second at Cannon Mountain (1964) and third in New Hampshire (1958). The 1964 championships were scheduled for Dartmouth Skiway, but rain forced the transfer of the alpine events to Cannon Mountain.

== Team scoring ==
Location in the United States

Rank	Team	Points
1st place, gold medalist(s)	Denver	386.6
2nd place, silver medalist(s)	Dartmouth	378.8
3rd place, bronze medalist(s)	Colorado	377.3
4	Wyoming	367.0
5	Fort Lewis	362.3
6	Middlebury	362.2
7	New Hampshire	357.3
8	Air Force	351.4
9	Washington	345.2
10	Vermont	341.9
11	St. Lawrence	326.5
12	Montana	323.4
13	Northern Michigan	295.5
14	Northern Arizona	247.1

== Individual events ==
Location in New Hampshire

Four events were held, which yielded seven individual titles.

- Wednesday: Giant Slalom (1st run)
- Thursday: Giant Slalom (2nd run), Cross Country
- Friday: Slalom
- Saturday: Jumping

Event	Champion		
Event	Skier	Team	Time/Score
Alpine	Mike Porcarelli	Colorado	5:04.34
Cross Country	(Norway) Ole Hansen	Denver	62:35
Giant Slalom ^	(Norway) Otto Tschudi	Denver	2:31.22
Jumping	Jay Rand	Colorado	206.3
Nordic	Jim Miller (2)	Fort Lewis	7:15.2
Skimeister	John Kendall	New Hampshire	
Slalom	Mike Porcarelli	Colorado	1:34.99

^ A giant slalom (2 runs) replaced the downhill

== See also ==
- List of NCAA skiing programs
