= 1962 NCAA skiing championships =

American college skiing competition

Coordinates: 39.196°N 120.235°W

1962 NCAA Skiing Championships

Tournament information
- Sport: College skiing
- Location: Olympic Valley, California
- Dates: March 22–25, 1962
- Administrator: NCAA
- Venue: Squaw Valley
- Teams: 7
- Number of events: 4 (7 titles)

Final positions
- Champions: Denver (6th title)
- 1st runners-up: Colorado
- 2nd runners-up: Western State

Location in the United States

The 1962 NCAA Skiing Championships were contested at the Squaw Valley Ski Resort in Olympic Valley, California at the ninth annual NCAA-sanctioned ski tournament to determine the individual and team national champions of men's collegiate alpine skiing, cross-country skiing, and ski jumping in the United States.

Denver, coached by Willy Schaeffler, captured their sixth national championship (and second consecutive), edging out rival Colorado in the team standings.

Scheduled as the opening event on Thursday, the downhill was postponed to Saturday due to heavy snowfall, and the jumping moved to Sunday.

Utah's Jim Gaddis reclaimed the alpine title he won two years earlier; he won the slalom, and was runner-up in the downhill, just a tenth of a second behind.

== Venue ==
This year's championships were held March 22–25 in California at Squaw Valley in Olympic Valley. Two years earlier, Squaw Valley had hosted the 1960 Winter Olympics.

The ninth NCAA championships, these were the first in California and the second in the Lake Tahoe area of the Sierra Nevada (1954 in Reno, Nevada).

== Team scoring ==
Rank	Team	Points
1st place, gold medalist(s)	Denver	390.08
2nd place, silver medalist(s)	Colorado	374.30
3rd place, bronze medalist(s)	Western State	361.40
4	Dartmouth	356.32
5	Nevada–Reno	333.79
6	California	294.17
7	Montana State	280.51

== Individual events ==
Location in California

Four events were held, which yielded seven individual titles.

- Thursday: Downhill (postponed to Saturday)
- Friday: Slalom
- Saturday: Downhill, Cross Country
- Sunday: Jumping

Event	Champion		
Event	Skier	Team	Time/Score
Alpine	Jim Gaddis (2)	Utah	3:29.7
Cross Country	Jim Page	Dartmouth	59:03
Downhill	Myke Baar	Denver	1:44.8
Jumping	(Norway) Oyvind Floystad	Denver	223.6
Nordic	(Norway) Tor Fageraas	Montana State	3:13.57
Skimeister	Jim Page	Dartmouth	361.67
Slalom	Jim Gaddis	Utah	1:26.7

== See also ==
- List of NCAA skiing programs
