= 1961 NCAA skiing championships =

American college skiing competition

Coordinates: 43.939°N 72.958°W

1961 NCAA Skiing Championships

Tournament information
- Sport: College skiing
- Location: Hancock, Vermont
- Dates: March 9–11, 1961
- Administrator: NCAA
- Host: Middlebury College
- Venue: Middlebury College Snow Bowl
- Teams: 7
- Number of events: 4 (7 titles)

Final positions
- Champions: Denver (5th title)
- 1st runners-up: Middlebury
- 2nd runners-up: Colorado

Location in the United States

The 1961 NCAA Skiing Championships were contested at the Middlebury College Snow Bowl in Hancock, Vermont at the eighth annual NCAA-sanctioned ski tournament to determine the individual and team national champions of men's collegiate alpine skiing, cross-country skiing, and ski jumping in the United States.

Denver, coached by Willy Schaeffler, captured their fifth national championship, the first since 1957, edging out host Middlebury in the team standings. This was the start of Denver's seven straight titles from 1961 through 1967.

== Venue ==
This year's championships were held March 9–11 in Vermont at the Middlebury College Snow Bowl in Hancock. Middlebury College, located in nearby Middlebury, served as hosts.

These were the first NCAA Championships hosted by Middlebury, the second in Vermont (Northfield, 1955), and third in the East (Lyme, New Hampshire, 1958).

== Team scoring ==
| Rank | Team | Points |
|---|---|---|
| 1st place, gold medalist(s) | Denver | 376.19 |
| 2nd place, silver medalist(s) | Middlebury | 366.94 |
| 3rd place, bronze medalist(s) | Colorado | 365.54 |
| 4 | Dartmouth | 356.06 |
| 5 | New Hampshire | 332.39 |
| 6 | Maine | 325.66 |
| 7 | Idaho | 309.51 |
| 8 | Washington | 278.57 |
| 9 | Williams | 277.55 |

== Individual events ==
Location in Vermont

Four events were held, which yielded seven individual titles.

- Thursday: Downhill, Cross Country
- Friday: Slalom
- Saturday: Jumping

| Event | Champion | | |
| Event | Skier | Team | Time/Score |
|---|---|---|---|
| Alpine | Buddy Werner | Colorado | 1:39.67 |
| Cross Country | Charlie Akers | Maine | 69:17 |
| Downhill | Gordi Eaton | Middlebury | 1:15.3 |
| Jumping | (Norway) Chris Selbekk | Denver | 226.3 |
| Nordic | John Bower | Middlebury | 3:14.12 |
| Skimeister | Art Bookstrom | Dartmouth | 366.24 |
| Slalom | Buddy Werner | Colorado | 1:35.2 |

== See also ==
- List of NCAA skiing programs
