= 2013 NCAA Skiing Championships =

Sporting event in Vermont, USA

The 2013 NCAA Skiing Championships were held in Ripton and Middlebury Vermont on March 6–9, 2013. Middlebury College hosted the event with alpine events at the Middlebury College Snow Bowl and Nordic events taking place at the Rikert Nordic Center. The competition was won by the Colorado Buffaloes after compiling the largest final-day comeback in NCAA Skiing Championships history. Twenty-one teams from three regions sent skiers to compete for the NCAA collegiate team championship and individual titles.

== Regional competitions ==
The NCAA skiing landscape is made up of three regions, each with one conference. The Western Region comprises the Rocky Mountain Intercollegiate Ski Association (RMISA), the Central Region of the Central Collegiate Ski Association (CCSA) and the Eastern Region of the Eastern Intercollegiate Ski Association (EISA). Qualification for the NCAA Championships is not only attained from competition in each regional.

Regional Name	Host	Date	Alpine Venue	Nordic Venue	Team Results
Western	Montana State Bobcats	Feb. 22–23, 2013	Bridger Bowl, Bozeman, MT	Bohart Ranch, Bozeman, MT	Colorado (905.5), Denver (859), Utah (805), New Mexico (755), Montana State (738.5)
Central	Michigan Tech Huskies	Feb. 21–22, 2013	Nordic Only	Michigan Tech Trails and Recreational Forest, Houghton, MI	Men-Northern Michigan (130), Alaska Fairbanks (123), St. Scholastica (95); Women-Alaska Fairbanks (129), Northern Michigan (124), Michigan Tech (100)
Eastern	Bates Bobcats	Feb. 21–22, 2014	Sunday River, Newry, ME	Black Mountain, Rumford, ME	Vermont (939.5), Dartmouth (908.5), New Hampshire (690), Middlebury (689), Williams (568)

== Venues and events ==
The NCAA Skiing Championships are coed championship made up of eight events, two events in both alpine and Nordic racing for both men and women. Alpine events are giant slalom and slalom and Nordic events are classical and freestyle (skate). In Nordic competition, there is typically one shorter interval start race and one longer mass start race, and every two years it flips.

In 2013, the events were: Women's Giant Slalom and Men's Giant Slalom on Wednesday, March 6; Women's 5K Classical and Men's 10K Classical interval start on Thursday, March 7; Women's and Men's Slalom on Friday, March 8; and Women's 15K Freestyle and Men's 20K Freestyle mass start on Saturday, March 9.

All alpine events took place at the Middlebury College Snow Bowl and Nordic events at the Rikert Nordic Center.

== Team results ==
Place	Team	M-GS	W-GS	M-CL	W-CL	M-SL	W-SL	M-FS	W-FS	Total
1.	Colorado	75	100.5	91	102	82.5	59	73	125	708
2.	Utah	67.5	97	87	98	45	86	133	51	665
3.	Vermont	115	112	67	95	91	84	34	55	653
4.	Denver	98.5	112	54	63	55	101	59	86	629
5.	Dartmouth	23	53.5	85	102	51.5	90	90	99	594
6.	New Mexico	89	55	74	62	91	78	63	64	576
7.	Alaska Anchorage	52.5	34	108	80	52	41	58	68	493.5
8.	New Hampshire	106.5	59	27	36	95	67	5	66	461.5
9.	Montana State	47	56	48	49	51	49	63	59	422
10.	Middlebury	52	31	53	42	103	21	42	13	357
11.	Northern Michigan	0	0	54	57	0	0	83	84	278
12.	Williams	0	33	10	17	0	33	36	14	143
13.	Colby	35	8	0	0	64	25	0	0	132
14.	Alaska Fairbanks	0	0	37	15	0	0	26.5	25	103.5
15.	St. Lawrence	29	14	10	0	7	26	3	0	89
16.	Bates	0	20	.5	3	0	24	2	8	57.5
17.	Harvard	0	22	0	0	0	17	0	0	39
18.	Maine-Presque Isle	0	0	15	0	0	0	23	0	38
19.	St. Scholastica	0	0	1	1	0	0	29	4	35
20.	St. Michael's	11	0	0	0	13	0	0	0	24
21.	Bowdoin	0	0	0	.5	0	0	0	1	1.5

== Individual champions ==
Individual champions are the winners of each of the eight races. Denver, Colorado and Vermont both captured two individual NCAA Championships while New Mexico and Utah had one apiece. Denver's Kristine Haugen became just the second alpine woman since 1990 and fifth overall to sweep the individual championships.

Women's Giant Slalom
Kristine Haugen, Denver
Men's Giant Slalom
Jonathon Norbotton, Vermont
Women's Slalom
Kristine Haugen, Denver
Men's Slalom
Joonas Rasanen, New Mexico
Men's 10K Classical
Rune Oedegaard, Colorado
Women's 5K Classical
Anja Gruber, Vermont
Women's 15K Freestyle
Joanne Reid, Colorado
Men's 20K Freestyle
Miles Havlick, Utah

== All-American honors ==
All-American honors for skiing are administered by the United States Collegiate Ski Coaches Association and are determined by race results from the NCAA Championships. The top five skiers in each race are awarded a first-team All-America honor while skiers 6-10 are awarded second-team honors.

Women's Giant Slalom
First Team: Kristine Haugen, Denver; Kristine Riis-Johannessen, Vermont; Kristiina Rove, Utah; Kate Ryley, Vermont; Brooke Wales, Colorado
Second Team: Devin Delaney, Denver; Thea Grosvold, Colorado; Ana Kobal, Utah; Geordie Lonza, Williams; Mary Sackbauer, Middlebury

Men's Giant Slalom
First Team: Chris Acosta, New Mexico; Jeremy Elliot, Utah; Sean Higgins, Vermont; Jonathon Norbotten, Vermont; Coley Oliver, New Hampshire
Second Team: Andreas Adde, Alaska Anchorage; Espen Lysdahl, Denver; Max Marno, Denver; Trevor Philp, Denver; Taylor Vest-Burton, New Hampshire

Women's Slalom
First Team: Tianda Carroll, Denver; Kristine Haugen, Denver; Lizzie Kistler, Dartmouth; Ana Kobal, Utah; Kristine Riis-Johannessen, Vermont
Second Team: Sara Kikut, Dartmouth; Georgie Lonza, Williams; Mateja Robnik, New Mexico; Kate Ryley, Vermont; Randa Teschner, New Hampshire

Men's Slalom
First Team: Sam Coffey, New Hampshire; David Donaldson, Middlebury; Jonathon Norbotten, Vermont; Joonas Rasanen, New Mexico; Taylor Vest-Burton, New Hampshire
Second Team: Chris Acosta, New Mexico; Kasper Hietanen, Colorado; Max Marno, Denver; Hig Roberts, Middlebury; Andy Trow, Utah

Women's 5K Classical
First Team: Marine Dusser, Alaska Anchorage; Anja Gruber, Vermont; Mary O'Connell, Dartmouth; Joanne Reid, Colorado; Sloan Storey, Utah
Second Team: Silje Benum, Denver; Linda Davind-Malm, Vermont; Annie Hart, Dartmouth; Maria Nordstrom, Colorado; Anna Svendsen, Utah

Men's 10K Classical
First Team: Viktor Brannmark, Alaska Anchorage; Ben Lustgarten, Middlebury; Rune Oedegaard, Colorado; Mats Resaland, New Mexico; Silas Talbot, Dartmouth
Second Team: Lukas Ebner, Alaska Anchorage; Miles Havlick, Utah; Lasse Molgaard-Nielsen, Alaska Anchorage; Scott Patterson, Vermont; Erik Soderman, Northern Michigan

Women's 15K Freestyle
First Team: Silje Benum, Denver; Marine Dusser, Alaska Anchorage; Eliska Hajkova, Colorado; Mary O'Connell, Dartmouth; Joanne Reid, Colorado
Second Team: Anya Bean, New Hampshire; Makayla Cappel, Denver; Annie Hart, Dartmouth; Rose Kemp, Utah; Rosie Frankowski, Northern Michigan

Men's 20K Freestyle
First Team: Miles Havlick, Utah; Niklas Persson, Utah; Rune Oedegaard, Colorado; Erik Soderman, Northern Michigan; Einar Ulsund, Utah
Second Team: Kyle Bratrud, Northern Michigan; Ben Lustgarten, Middlebury; Mats Resaland, New Mexico; Silas Talbot, Dartmouth; Sam Tarling, Dartmouth

Overall All-American Honors By School
Utah 12, Denver 11, Vermont 10, Colorado 9, Dartmouth 8, New Mexico 7, Alaska Anchorage 6, New Hampshire 6, Middlebury 5, Northern Michigan 4, Williams 2

Overall First-Team All-American Honors
Utah 7, Vermont 7, Colorado 6, Dartmouth 4, Alaska Anchorage 3, Denver 3, New Mexico 3, Middlebury 2, Northern Michigan 1

Overall Alpine All-Americans
Denver 8, Vermont 7, New Hampshire 5, Utah 5, New Mexico 4, Colorado 3, Middlebury 3, Dartmouth 2, Williams 2, Alaska Anchorage 1

Overall Nordic All-Americans
Utah 7, Colorado 6, Dartmouth 6, Alaska Anchorage 5, Northern Michigan 4, Denver 3, New Mexico 3, Vermont 3, Middlebury 2, New Hampshire 1
