= 1964 NCAA skiing championships =

American college skiing competition

Coordinates: 44.177°N 71.701°W

1964 NCAA Skiing Championships

Tournament information
- Sport: College skiing
- Location: (New Hampshire) Franconia Notch and Lyme, New Hampshire
- Dates: March 5–7, 1964
- Administrator: NCAA
- Host: Dartmouth
- Venue(s): Cannon Mountain (alpine); Dartmouth Skiway (nordic)
- Teams: 10
- Number of events: 4 events (7 titles)

Final positions
- Champions: Denver (8th title)
- 1st runners-up: Dartmouth
- 2nd runners-up: Wyoming

The 1964 NCAA Skiing Championships were contested at the Cannon Mountain Ski Area in Franconia Notch, New Hampshire at the eleventh annual NCAA-sanctioned ski tournament to determine the individual and team national champions of men's collegiate alpine skiing, cross-country skiing, and ski jumping in the United States.

Denver, coached by Willy Schaeffler, captured their eighth, and fourth consecutive, national championship, edging out host Dartmouth in the team standings.

== Venues ==
This year's championships were held in New Hampshire, with the alpine events at Cannon Mountain, near Franconia Notch, and the nordic events at Dartmouth Skiway, near Lyme.

The eleventh edition, these were the second NCAA championships in New Hampshire (1958 at Dartmouth Skiway) and the fourth in the East; the other two (1955, 1961) were in Vermont.

Originally scheduled for March 5–7 at Dartmouth Skiway, rain forced a move of the alpine events to nearby Vermont at Mount Ascutney, and again to Cannon Mountain; the nordic events were held at Dartmouth on Friday. The downhill was replaced with a giant slalom on Saturday morning, followed by a slalom in the afternoon, both won by John Clough of Middlebury.

== Team scoring ==
Location in the United States

Rank	Team	Points
1st place, gold medalist(s)	Denver	370.2
2nd place, silver medalist(s)	Dartmouth	368.8
3rd place, bronze medalist(s)	Wyoming	359.7
4	Western State	355.0
5	Middlebury	354.3
6	Washington	333.8
7	Williams	322.1
8	Vermont	308.9
9	Harvard	298.5
10	Notre Dame	221.7

== Individual events ==
Locations in New Hampshire

Four events were held, which yielded seven individual titles.

- Thursday: Downhill (cancelled, rain)
- Friday: Cross Country, Jumping
- Saturday: Giant slalom, Slalom

Event	Champion		
Event	Skier	Team	Time/Score
Alpine	John Clough	Middlebury	2:49.4
Cross Country	Eddie Demers (2)	Western State	56:30
Giant slalom ^	John Clough	Middlebury	1:31.3
Jumping	(Norway) Frithjof Prydz (Norway) Erik Jansen	Utah; Denver	214.5
Nordic	(Norway) Erik Jansen	Denver	7:16.3
Skimeister	Jennings Cress	Western State	336.0
Slalom	John Clough	Middlebury	1:24.5

^ A giant slalom replaced the weather-cancelled downhill

== See also ==
- List of NCAA skiing programs
