= 1988 NCAA Skiing Championships =

American college skiing competition

Tournament information
- Sport: College skiing
- Location: Hancock, Vermont
- Administrator: NCAA
- Host(s): Middlebury College
- Venue(s): Middlebury College Snow Bowl
- Teams: 15
- Number of events: 8

Final positions
- Champions: Utah (6th title)
- 1st runners-up: Vermont
- 2nd runners-up: Colorado

The 1988 NCAA Skiing Championships were contested at the Middlebury College Snow Bowl in Hancock, Vermont as part of the 35th annual NCAA-sanctioned ski tournament to determine the individual and team national champions of men's and women's collegiate slalom skiing and cross-country skiing in the United States.

Two-time defending champions Utah, coached by Pat Miller, claimed their sixth team national championship, 37 points ahead of Vermont in the cumulative team standings.

== Venue ==
This year's championships were contested at the Middlebury College Snow Bowl in Hancock, Vermont. Middlebury College served as hosts.

These were the sixth championships held in the state of Vermont (1955, 1961, 1973, 1980, 1986, and 1988).

== Program ==
=== Men's events ===
- Slalom
- Giant slalom
- Cross country
- Cross country relay

=== Women's events ===
- Slalom
- Giant slalom
- Cross country
- Cross country relay

== Team scoring ==
Championships site

Rank	Team	Points
1st place, gold medalist(s)	Utah	651
2nd place, silver medalist(s)	Vermont	614
3rd place, bronze medalist(s)	Colorado	515 1/2
4	Wyoming	506
5	Dartmouth	495
6	New Mexico	411 1/2
7	Alaska Anchorage	277.5
8	Middlebury	244
9	St. Lawrence	228
10	Williams	197
11	New Hampshire	124
12	Alaska Fairbanks	32
13	Saint Michael's	14
14	Harvard	10
15	New England College	7 1/2

== See also ==
- List of NCAA skiing programs
