= 1971 NCAA Skiing Championships =

American college skiing competition

Coordinates: 44.329°N 103.835°W

Tournament information
- Sport: College skiing
- Location: Lead, South Dakota
- Dates: March 4–6, 1971
- Administrator: NCAA
- Venue: Terry Peak
- Teams: 12
- Number of events: 4 (7 titles)

Final positions
- Champions: Denver (14th title)
- 1st runners-up: Colorado
- 2nd runners-up: Middlebury

The 1971 NCAA Skiing Championships were contested at Terry Peak ski area in Lead, South Dakota, at the 18th annual NCAA-sanctioned ski tournament to determine the individual and team national champions of men's collegiate alpine skiing, cross-country skiing, and ski jumping in the United States.

Denver, under new head coach Peder Pytte, captured their fourteenth national championship and tenth in eleven years. They finished 21.6 points ahead of rival Colorado in the team standings.

Denver's Otto Tschudi, winner of the previous year's giant slalom, swept the three alpine titles; teammate Ole Hansen repeated as Cross Country champion, and John Kendall of New Hampshire repeated as Skimeister (all four events).

Despite Denver's impressive streak of success, the Pioneers' next team title came in 2000, nearly three decades later.

== Venue ==
The eighteenth edition, this year's NCAA skiing championships were held March 4–6 in South Dakota at Terry Peak, in the Black Hills near Lead.

Through 2020, these remain the only championships hosted in South Dakota.

== Team scoring ==
Location in the United States

| Rank | Team | Points |
|---|---|---|
| 1st place, gold medalist(s) | Denver | 394.7 |
| 2nd place, silver medalist(s) | Colorado | 373.1 |
| 3rd place, bronze medalist(s) | Middlebury | 368.8 |
| 4 | Dartmouth | 368.3 |
| 5 | New Hampshire | 367.0 |
| 6 | Wyoming | 360.8 |
| 7 | Fort Lewis | 358.5 |
| 8 | Utah | 328.8 |
| 9 | Montana | 326.3 |
| 10 | Northern Michigan | 317.7 |
| 11 | Nevada–Reno | 308.2 |
| 12 | Michigan Tech | 249.0 |

== Individual events ==
Location in South Dakota

Four events were held, which yielded seven individual titles.

- Thursday: Downhill (2 runs), Cross Country
- Friday: Slalom
- Saturday: Jumping

| Event | Champion | | |
| Event | Skier | Team | Time/Score |
|---|---|---|---|
| Alpine | (Norway) Otto Tschudi | Denver | 3:21.68 |
| Cross Country | (Norway) Ole Hansen (2) | Denver | 55:05 |
| Downhill | (Norway) Otto Tschudi (2) | Denver | 2:31.22 |
| Jumping | (Norway) Vidar Nilsgard | Colorado | 222.5 |
| Nordic | Bruce Cunningham | New Hampshire | 7:04.9 |
| Skimeister | John Kendall (2) | New Hampshire | 346.8 |
| Slalom | (Norway) Otto Tschudi | Denver | 1:33.40 |

== See also ==
- List of NCAA skiing programs
