= 2005 NCAA Skiing Championships =

American college skiing competition

Tournament information
- Sport: College skiing
- Location: Hancock, Vermont
- Administrator: NCAA
- Host(s): Middlebury College
- Venue(s): Middlebury College Snow Bowl
- Teams: 22
- Number of events: 8

Final positions
- Champions: Denver (18th overall, 4th co-ed)
- 1st runners-up: Vermont
- 2nd runners-up: Utah

The 2005 NCAA Skiing Championships were contested at the Middlebury College Snow Bowl in Hancock, Vermont as part of the 52nd annual NCAA-sanctioned ski tournament to determine the individual and team national champions of men's and women's collegiate slalom and cross-country skiing in the United States.

Denver, coached by Kurt Smitz, won the team championship, the Pioneers' fourth co-ed title and seventeenth overall.

== Venue ==
The championships were contested at Stowe Mountain Resort in Stowe, VT on the Hayride trail. University of Vermont served as hosts.

These were the tenth championships held in the state of Vermont.

== Program ==
=== Men's events ===
- Cross country, 10 kilometer freestyle
- Cross country, 20 kilometer classical
- Slalom
- Giant slalom

=== Women's events ===
- Cross country, 5 kilometer freestyle
- Cross country, 15 kilometer classical
- Slalom
- Giant slalom

== Team scoring ==
Championships site

Rank	Team	Points
1st place, gold medalist(s)	Denver	622 1/2
2nd place, silver medalist(s)	Vermont	575
3rd place, bronze medalist(s)	Utah (DC)	545
4	New Mexico	518
5	Dartmouth	486
6	Colorado	438
7	Alaska Anchorage	436
8	Middlebury	326
9	Nevada	303
10	Northern Michigan	300
11	Colby	280
12	New Hampshire	222 1/2
13	Montana State	209
14	Williams	201
15	Alaska Fairbanks	165
16	Boise State	92
17	Whitman	71
18	Michigan Tech	61
19	St. Lawrence	56
20	Wisconsin Green Bay	42
21	Bates	30
22	Western State	26

- DC – Defending champions
- Debut team appearance

== See also ==
- List of NCAA skiing programs
