= 2001 NCAA Skiing Championships =

American college skiing competition

Tournament information
- Sport: College skiing
- Location: Hancock, Vermont
- Administrator: NCAA
- Host(s): Middlebury College
- Venue(s): Middlebury College Snow Bowl
- Teams: 22
- Number of events: 8

Final positions
- Champions: Denver (16th overall, 2nd co-ed)
- 1st runners-up: Vermont
- 2nd runners-up: Colorado

The 2001 NCAA Skiing Championships were contested at the Middlebury College Snow Bowl in Hancock, Vermont as part of the 48th annual NCAA-sanctioned ski tournament to determine the individual and team national champions of men's and women's collegiate slalom and cross-country skiing in the United States.

Defending champions Denver, coached by Kurt Smitz, won the team championship, the Pioneers' second co-ed title and sixteenth overall.

== Venue ==
This year's championships were contested at the Middlebury College Snow Bowl in Hancock, Vermont. Middlebury College served as hosts.

These were the ninth championships held in the state of Vermont.

== Program ==
=== Men's events ===
- Cross country, 20 kilometer freestyle
- Cross country, 10 kilometer classical
- Slalom
- Giant slalom

=== Women's events ===
- Cross country, 15 kilometer freestyle
- Cross country, 5 kilometer classical
- Slalom
- Giant slalom

== Team scoring ==
Championships site

Rank	Team	Points
1st place, gold medalist(s)	Denver (DC)	649
2nd place, silver medalist(s)	Vermont	605
3rd place, bronze medalist(s)	Colorado	595 1/2
4	Utah	590 1/2
5	New Mexico	496 1/2
6	Dartmouth	449 1/2
7	Middlebury	368
8	Northern Michigan	361
9	Nevada	334 1/2
10	Alaska Anchorage	284
11	New Hampshire	274
12	Williams	252
13	Bates	174
14	Western State	147 1/2
15	Montana State	137
T16	Alaska Fairbanks	63
T16	Michigan Tech	63
18	St. Lawrence	52
19	St. Olaf	51
20	Wisconsin–Green Bay	50
21	Colby	42
22	Harvard	20

- DC – Defending champions
- Debut team appearance

== See also ==
- List of NCAA skiing programs
