= 2002 NCAA Skiing Championships =

American college skiing competition

Tournament information
- Sport: College skiing
- Location: Girdwood, Alaska
- Administrator: NCAA
- Host(s): University of Alaska Anchorage
- Venue(s): Alyeska Resort
- Teams: 23
- Number of events: 8

Final positions
- Champions: Denver (17th overall, 3rd co-ed)
- 1st runners-up: Colorado
- 2nd runners-up: Utah

The 2002 NCAA Skiing Championships were contested at the Alyeska Resort in Girdwood, Alaska as part of the 49th annual NCAA-sanctioned ski tournament to determine the individual and team national champions of men's and women's collegiate slalom and cross-country skiing in the United States.

Two-time defending champions Denver, coached by Kurt Smitz, again won the team championship, the Pioneers' third co-ed title and seventeenth overall.

== Venue ==
The championships were hosted at the Alyeska Resort in Girdwood, Alaska, with the University of Alaska Anchorage as hosts.

These were the second championships held in Alaska (1987 and 2002).

== Program ==
=== Men's events ===
- Cross country, 20 kilometer freestyle
- Cross country, 10 kilometer classical
- Slalom
- Giant slalom

=== Women's events ===
- Cross country, 15 kilometer freestyle
- Cross country, 5 kilometer classical
- Slalom
- Giant slalom

== Team scoring ==
Championships site

Rank	Team	Points
1st place, gold medalist(s)	Denver (DC)	656
2nd place, silver medalist(s)	Colorado	612
3rd place, bronze medalist(s)	Utah	609 1/2
4	New Mexico	569
5	Vermont	521 1/2
6	Nevada	444
7	Dartmouth	412 1/2
8	Northern Michigan	327
9	New Hampshire	310 1/2
10	Alaska Anchorage	310
11	Middlebury	296
12	Williams	175
13	Alaska Fairbanks	163 1/2
14	Western State	154
15	Bates	116
16	Montana State	82
17	Colby	60 1/2
18	St. Lawrence	60
19	St. Olaf	59
20	Harvard	39
21	Saint Michael's	25
22	Michigan Tech	20
23	Bowdoin	19

- DC – Defending champions
- Debut team appearance

== See also ==
- List of NCAA skiing programs
