= 2014 NCAA Skiing Championships =

Sporting event in Utah, USA

The 2014 NCAA Skiing Championships were held in Park City, Utah and Midway, Utah on March 5–8, 2014. Utah hosted the event with alpine events at Park City Ski Resort and Nordic events taking place at Soldier Hollow in nearby Midway, UT. Utah hosted for the fourth time, all have happened in Park City, the other times being 1981, 1991 and 2000.

The Denver Pioneers won the NCAA Championship, the school's 22nd in the sport, more than any other school. The Pioneers scored 556 points and won by 68.5 points over Vermont, who scored 487.5.

== Regional Competitions ==
The NCAA skiing landscape is made up of three regions, each with one conference. The Western Region comprises the Rocky Mountain Intercollegiate Ski Association (RMISA), the Central Region of the Central Collegiate Ski Association (CCSA) and the Eastern Region of the Eastern Intercollegiate Ski Association (EISA). Qualification for the NCAA Championships is not only attained from competition in each regional.

Regional Name	Host	Date	Alpine Venue	Nordic Venue	Team Results
Western	Denver	Feb. 21-22, 2014	Beaver Creek Resort, Beaver Creek, CO	Maloit Park, Minturn, CO	Utah (639), Colorado (636), New Mexico (617.5), Denver (578.5), Montana State (445)
Central	Michigan Tech	Feb. 15-16, 2014	Nordic Only	Michigan Tech Trails and Recreational Forest, Houghton, MI	Men-Northern Michigan (129), Alaska Fairbanks (122), St. Scholastica (93); Women-Northern Michigan (128), St. Scholastica (109), Alaska Fairbanks (99)
Eastern	Middlebury	Feb. 21-22, 2014	Middlebury College Snow Bowl, Middlebury, VT	Rikert Nordic Center, Ripton, VT	Vermont (1,031), Dartmouth (905), Middlebury (664), Colby (641), New Hampshire (633)

== Venues And Events ==
The NCAA Skiing Championships are coed championship made up of eight events, two events in both alpine and Nordic racing for both men and women. Alpine events are giant slalom and slalom and Nordic events are classical and freestyle (skate). In Nordic competition, there is typically one shorter interval start race and one longer mass start race, and every two years it flips.

In 2014, the events were: Women's Giant slalom and Men's giant slalom on Wednesday, March 5; Women's 5K Classical and Men's 10K Classical interval start on Thursday, March 6; Men's and Women's slalom and Men's 20K Freestyle and Women's 15K Freestyle mass start on Saturday, March 8. The slalom races were originally scheduled for Friday, March 7, but were postponed a day due to course conditions.

All alpine events took place at Park City and Nordic events at Soldier Hollow.

== Team Results ==
Place	Team	M-GS	W-GS	M-CL	W-CL	M-SL	W-SL	M-FS	W-FS	Total
1.	Denver	69	61	89	80	99	77	35	46	556
2.	Vermont	62	39	20.5	65	82	111	37	71	487.5
3.	New Mexico	62	68	57	44	68	41.5	65	53	458.5
4.	Colorado	67.5	60	83	30	10	57	56	39	402.5
5.	Utah	78	87	38	45	42	20	31	51	392
6.	Dartmouth	29	25	40	37	26	24.5	56	24	261.5
7.	Northern Michigan	-	-	66	59	-	-	53	61	239
8.	Alaska Anchorage	49	13	30	2	10	37	33	40	235
9.	Montana State	28.5	20	23.5	32.5	10	37	33	40	224.5
10.	Alaska Fairbanks	-	-	45	31	-	-	50	18	144
11.	New Hampshire	7	38	1	13	42	27	12	0	140
12.	Middlebury	39	19	-	12.5	37	12	-	6	125.5
13.	Colby	3	26	-	5	2	41	-	0	77
14.	Harvard	-	27	0	14	-	11	1	8	61
15.	Williams	-	15	0	0	-	16	16	-	47
16.	St. Olaf	-	-	-	16	-	-	-	25	41
17.	St. Scholastica	-	-	6	-	-	-	23	-	29
18.	Michigan Tech	-	-	-	0	-	-	-	21	21
19.	St. Michael's	4	-	-	-	12	-	-	-	16
20.	Bowdoin	-	-	0	12	-	-	0	3	15
21.	Plymouth State	1	-	-	-	9	-	-	-	10
22.	Bates	-	-	0	1	-	-	0	6	7
23.	St. Lawrence	0	0	-	-	0	0	-	-	0

== Individual Champions ==
Individual champions are the winners of each of the eight races. Ironically, for the second straight season, Denver, Colorado and Vermont both captured two individual championships with New Mexico and Utah claiming one apiece. Three of the eight skiers successfully defended their individual championships; Kristine Haugen in the women's giant slalom race; Colorado's Rune Oedegaard in the men's 10K Classical race and Vermont's Anja Gruber in the women's 5K Classical race. Additionally, Denver's Espen Lysdahl won the men's slalom for a second time, also winning in 2012.

Women's giant slalom
Kristine Haugen, Denver
Men's giant slalom
Mark Engel, Utah
Women's slalom
Kristina Riis-Johannessen, Vermont
Men's slalom
Espen Lysdahl, Denver
Men's 10K Classical
Rune Oedegaard, Colorado
Women's 5K Classical
Anja Gruber, Vermont
Women's 15K Freestyle
Eva Severrus, New Mexico
Men's 20K Freestyle
Mads Stroem, Colorado

== All-American Honors ==
All-American honors for skiing are administered by the United States Collegiate Ski Coaches Association and are determined by race results from the NCAA Championships. The top five skiers in each race are awarded a first-team All-America honor while skiers 6-10 are awarded second-team honors.

Women's giant slalom
First Team: Kristine Haugen, Denver; Chloe Fausa, Utah; Kristiina Rove, Utah; Kate Ryley, Vermont; Brooke Wales, Colorado
Second Team: Courtney Altringer, New Mexico; Jessica Honkonen, Colorado; Rebecca Nadler, Harvard, Karoline Myklebust, New Mexico; Randa Teschner, New Hampshire

Men's giant slalom
First Team: Mark Engel, Utah; Henrik Gunnarsson, Colorado; Niko Harmanen, Alaska Anchorage; Trevor Philp, Denver; Armin Triendl, New Mexico
Second Team: Joergen Brath, Utah; Kevin Drury, Vermont; Sean Horner, New Mexico; Espen Lysdahl, Denver; Jonathan Norbotten, Vermont

Women's slalom
First Team: Kristine Haugen, Denver; Jessica Honkonen, Colorado; Kristine Riis-Johannessen, Vermont; Kate Ryley, Vermont; Elise-Woien Tefre, Vermont
Second Team: Tianda Carroll, Denver; Devin Delaney, Denver; Thea Grosvold, Colorado; Mateja Robnik, New Mexico; Randa Teschner, New Hampshire

Men's slalom
First Team: Niko Harmanen, Alaska Anchorage; Sean Horner, New Mexico; Espen Lysdahl, Denver; Jonathan Nordbotten, Vermont; Trevor Philp, Denver
Second Team: Sebastian Brigovic, Denver; Travis Dawson, Vermont; Kevin Drury, Vermont; Sean Horner, New Mexico; Andy Trow, Utah

Women's 5K Classical
First Team: Nichole Bathe, Alaska Fairbanks; Anja Gruber, Vermont; Sylvia Nordskar, Denver; Eva Severrus, New Mexico; Jessica Yeaton, Montana State
Second Team: Makayla Cappel, Denver; Mary Kate Cirelli, Northern Michigan; Rosie Frankowski, Northern Michigan; Sloan Storey, Utah; Anna Svendsen, Utah

Men's 10K Classical
First Team: Pierre Guedon, Denver; Moritz Madlener, Denver; Rune Oedegaard, Colorado; Niklas Persson, Utah; Mads Stroem, Colorado
Second Team: Kyle Bratrud, Northern Michigan; Lukas Ebner, Alaska Anchorage; Trygve Markset, Denver; Aku Nikander, New Mexico; Fredrik Schwencke, Northern Michigan

Women's 15K Freestyle
First Team: Linda Davind-Malm, Vermont; Rosie Frankowski, Northern Michigan; Anja Gruber, Vermont; Sylvia Nordskar, Denver; Eva Severrus, New Mexico
Second Team: Marine Dusser, Alaska Anchorage; Alice Flanders, Michigan Tech; Anne Hart, Dartmouth; Paige Schember, St. Olaf; Sloan Storey, Utah

Men's 20K Freestyle
First Team: Patrick Caldwell, Dartmouth; Pierre Guedon, Denver; Max Olex, Alaska Fairbanks; Mats Resaland, New Mexico; Mads Stroem, Colorado
Second Team: Lukas Ebner, Alaska Anchorage; Sawyer Kisselheim, Montana State; Aljaz Praznik, New Mexico; Paul Schommer, St. Scholastica; Fredrik Schwencke, Northern Michigan

Overall All-American Honors By School
Denver 16, Vermont 12, New Mexico 11, Utah 9, Colorado 8, Northern Michigan 6, Alaska Anchorage 5, New Hampshire 3, Alaska Fairbanks 2, Dartmouth 2, Harvard 1, Michigan Tech 1, Montana State 1, St. Olaf 1, St. Scholastica 1

Overall First-Team All-American Honors
Denver 10, Vermont 8, Colorado 6, New Mexico 5, Utah 4, Alaska Anchorage 2, Alaska Fairbanks 2, Dartmouth 1, Montana State 1, Northern Michigan 1
