= 1959 NCAA Skiing Championships =

American college skiing competition

Coordinates: 39.887°N 105.763°W

Tournament information
- Sport: College skiing
- Location: Winter Park, Colorado
- Dates: March 27–29, 1959
- Administrator: NCAA
- Venue: Winter Park Ski Area
- Teams: 9
- Number of events: 4 (7 titles)

Final positions
- Champions: Colorado (1st title)
- 1st runners-up: Denver
- 2nd runners-up: Dartmouth

The 1959 NCAA Skiing Championships were contested in Winter Park, Colorado at the sixth annual NCAA-sanctioned ski tournament to determine the individual and team national champions of men's collegiate alpine skiing, cross-country skiing, and ski jumping in the United States.

Colorado, coached by Bob Beattie, captured their first national championship, edging out rival Denver in the team standings.

The sole repeat individual champion was Denver's Clarence Servold, in cross country.

== Venue ==
Location in the United States
Location in Colorado

This year's championships were held March 27–29 in Colorado at Winter Park, west of Denver.

These were the second NCAA championships at Winter Park (and in Colorado), which previously hosted in 1956.

== Team scoring ==
| Rank | Team | Points |
|---|---|---|
| 1st place, gold medalist(s) | Colorado | 549.4 |
| 2nd place, silver medalist(s) | Denver | 543.6 |
| 3rd place, bronze medalist(s) | Dartmouth | 542.7 |
| 4 | Utah | 502.3 |
| 5 | Western State | 489.5 |
| 6 | Nevada | 460.1 |
| 7 | Middlebury | 453.5 |
| 8 | Michigan Tech | 443.6 |
| 9 | Idaho | 406.7 |

== Individual events ==
Four events were held, which yielded seven individual titles.

- Friday: Slalom
- Saturday: Downhill, Cross Country
- Sunday: Jumping

| Event | Champion | | |
| Event | Skier | Team | Time/Score |
|---|---|---|---|
| Alpine | Marvin Melville | Utah | 1:40.0 |
| Cross Country | (Canada) Clarence Servold (2) | Denver | 59:55.0 |
| Downhill | Marvin Melville | Utah | 1:28.8 |
| Jumping | Dave Butts | Colorado | 222.0 |
| Nordic | Ted Farwell | Denver | 1:36.7 |
| Skimeister | Dave Butts | Colorado | 365.0 |
| Slalom | Marvin Melville | Utah | 1:59.0 |

== See also ==
- List of NCAA skiing programs
