= 1997 NCAA Skiing Championships =

American college skiing competition

Tournament information
- Sport: College skiing
- Location: Stowe, Vermont
- Administrator: NCAA
- Venue(s): Stowe Mountain Resort
- Teams: 21
- Number of events: 8

Final positions
- Champions: Utah (9th overall, 8th co-ed)
- 1st runners-up: Denver
- 2nd runners-up: Vermont

The 1997 NCAA Skiing Championships were contested at the Stowe Mountain Resort in Stowe, Vermont as the 44th annual NCAA-sanctioned ski tournament to determine the individual and team national champions of men's and women's collegiate slalom and cross-country skiing in the United States.

Defending champions Utah, coached by Pat Miller, won the team championship, the Utes' ninth title overall and eighth as a co-ed team.

== Venue ==
This year's NCAA skiing championships were hosted at the Stowe Mountain Resort in Stowe, Vermont

These were the seventh championships held in the state of Vermont (1955, 1961, 1973, 1980, 1986, 1990, and 1997) and fourth at Stowe (1980, 1986, 1990, and 1997).

== Program ==
=== Men's events ===
- Cross country, 20 kilometer freestyle
- Cross country, 10 kilometer classical
- Slalom
- Giant slalom

=== Women's events ===
- Cross country, 15 kilometer freestyle
- Cross country, 5 kilometer classical
- Slalom
- Giant slalom

== Team scoring ==
Championships site

Rank	Team	Points
1st place, gold medalist(s)	Utah (DC)	686
2nd place, silver medalist(s)	Vermont	646 1/2
3rd place, bronze medalist(s)	Colorado	638
4	Denver	536
5	Alaska Anchorage	522
6	Middlebury	464
7	Western State	428
8	New Mexico	407 1/2
9	Dartmouth	387
10	Bates	259
11	New Hampshire	242
12	Williams	152 1/2
13	Wisconsin–Green Bay	146 1/2
14	Northern Michigan	133
15	Montana State	84
16	Nevada	76
17	St. Lawrence	46
18	Massachusetts	36
19	Bowdoin	34
20	Saint Michael's	32
21	Alaska Fairbanks	28

- DC – Defending champions
- Debut team appearance

== See also ==
- List of NCAA skiing programs
