= 2004 NCAA Skiing Championships =

American college skiing competition

Tournament information
- Sport: College skiing
- Location: Truckee, California
- Dates: March 10–March 13
- Administrator: NCAA
- Host(s): University of Nevada, Reno
- Venue(s): Auburn Ski Club (nordic); Sugar Bowl Ski Resort (alpine)
- Teams: 22
- Number of events: 8

Final positions
- Champions: New Mexico (1st overall, 1st co-ed)
- 1st runners-up: Utah
- 2nd runners-up: Denver

The 2004 NCAA Skiing Championships were contested at the Sugar Bowl Ski Resort in Truckee, California from March 10–13, 2004 as part of the 51st annual NCAA-sanctioned ski tournament to determine the individual and team national champions of men's and women's collegiate slalom and cross-country skiing in the United States.

New Mexico, coached by George Brooks, won the team championship, the Lobos' first co-ed title and first overall. It was New Mexico's first team NCAA championship in any sport.

== Venue ==
This year's championships were contested at the Sugar Bowl Ski Resort in Truckee, California. The event was hosted by the University of Nevada, Reno.

These were the first NCAA championships hosted at Sugar Bowl and the second in the state of California (1962 and 2004).

== Program ==
=== Men's events ===
- Cross country, 10 kilometer freestyle
- Cross country, 20 kilometer classical
- Slalom
- Giant slalom

=== Women's events ===
- Cross country, 5 kilometer freestyle
- Cross country, 15 kilometer classical
- Slalom
- Giant slalom

== Team scoring ==
Championships site

Rank	Team	Points
1st place, gold medalist(s)	New Mexico	623
2nd place, silver medalist(s)	Utah (DC)	581
3rd place, bronze medalist(s)	Denver	568
4	Colorado	564
5	Vermont	533 1/2
6	Alaska Anchorage	504
7	Middlebury	495 1/2
8	Dartmouth	391
9	Nevada	383
10	Alaska Fairbanks	219
11	Colby	210 1/2
12	Northern Michigan	198 1/2
13	Williams	178
14	New Hampshire	149
15	Montana State	127
16	Western State	110
17	Boise State	67
18	Whitman	62
19	Harvard	40
20	Bates	27
21	Michigan Tech	11
22	Wisconsin Green Bay	1

- DC – Defending champions
- Debut team appearance

== See also ==
- List of NCAA skiing programs
