= 1987 NCAA skiing championships =

American college skiing competition

1987 NCAA Skiing Championships

Tournament information
- Sport: College skiing
- Location: Girdwood, Alaska
- Administrator: NCAA
- Venue(s): Alyeska Resort
- Teams: 16
- Number of events: 8

Final positions
- Champions: Utah (5th title)
- 1st runners-up: Vermont
- 2nd runners-up: Colorado

The 1987 NCAA Skiing Championships were contested at the Alyeska Resort in Girdwood, Alaska as part of the 34th annual NCAA-sanctioned ski tournament to determine the individual and team national champions of men's and women's collegiate slalom skiing and cross-country skiing in the United States.

Defending champions Utah, coached by Pat Miller, claimed their fifth team national championship, 83 points ahead of Vermont in the cumulative team standings.

== Venue ==
This year's NCAA skiing championships were hosted at the Alyeska Resort in Girdwood, Alaska.

These were the first championships held in Alaska.

== Program ==
=== Men's events ===
- Slalom
- Giant slalom
- Cross country
- Cross country relay

=== Women's events ===
- Slalom
- Giant slalom
- Cross country
- Cross country relay

== Team scoring ==
Championships site

Rank	Team	Points
1st place, gold medalist(s)	Utah	710
2nd place, silver medalist(s)	Vermont	627
3rd place, bronze medalist(s)	Colorado	593
4	Wyoming	582
5	New Mexico	506 1/2
6	Middlebury	425 1/2
7	Alaska Anchorage	425
8	Dartmouth	385
9	New Hampshire	196
10	Alaska Fairbanks	172
11	St. Lawrence	167
12	Williams	106
13	Bates	80
14	Nevada–Reno; New England College	41
16	Norwich	23

== See also ==
- List of NCAA skiing programs
