= 1982 NCAA Skiing Championships =

American college skiing competition

Tournament information
- Sport: College skiing
- Location: (New York (state)) Lake Placid, New York
- Administrator: NCAA
- Venue(s): Whiteface Ski Resort
- Teams: 20

Final positions
- Champions: Colorado (11th title)
- 1st runners-up: Vermont
- 2nd runners-up: Utah

The 1982 NCAA Skiing Championships were contested at the Whiteface Ski Resort in Lake Placid, New York, as part of the 29th annual NCAA-sanctioned ski tournament to determine the individual and team national champions of men's collegiate slalom skiing and cross-country skiing in the United States.

Colorado, coached by Tim Hinderman, claimed their eleventh team national championship, 24.5 points ahead of Vermont in the cumulative team standings.

== Venue ==
Championships site

This year's NCAA skiing championships were hosted at the Whiteface Ski Resort in Lake Placid, New York.

These were the second championships held in the state of New York (1980).

== Team scoring ==
Rank	Team	Points
1st place, gold medalist(s)	Colorado	461
2nd place, silver medalist(s)	Vermont	436.5
3rd place, bronze medalist(s)	Utah	412.5
4	Wyoming	401.5
5	Middlebury	324.5
6	Dartmouth	297
7	Alaska–Anchorage	250
8	Montana State	249
9	New Mexico	220.5
10	St. Lawrence	179
11	Minnesota–Duluth	95.5
12	New Hampshire	92
13	Williams	87
14	New England College	68
15	Alaska–Fairbanks	66.5
16	Northern Michigan	59
17	Nevada–Reno	54
18	Lyndon State	19
19	Bates	11
20	Denver	6

== See also ==
- List of NCAA skiing programs
