= 1990 NCAA Skiing Championships =

American college skiing competition

Tournament information
- Sport: College skiing
- Location: Stowe, Vermont
- Administrator: NCAA
- Venue(s): Stowe Mountain Resort
- Teams: 15
- Number of events: 8

Final positions
- Champions: Vermont (3rd title)
- 1st runners-up: Utah
- 2nd runners-up: Colorado

The 1990 NCAA Skiing Championships were contested at the Stowe Mountain Resort in Stowe, Vermont as the 37th annual NCAA-sanctioned ski tournament to determine the individual and team national champions of men's and women's collegiate slalom and cross-country skiing in the United States.

Defending champions Vermont, coached by Chip LaCasse, claimed their third team national championship, finishing 100 points ahead of Utah in the cumulative team standings.

== Venue ==
This year's NCAA skiing championships were hosted at the Stowe Mountain Resort in Stowe, Vermont

These were the sixth championships held in the state of Vermont (1955, 1961, 1973, 1980, 1986, and 1990) and third at Stowe (1980, 1986, and 1990).

== Program ==
=== Men's events ===
- Cross country, 10 kilometer classical
- Cross country, 20 kilometer freestyle
- Slalom
- Giant slalom

=== Women's events ===
- Cross country, 5 kilometer classical
- Cross country, 15 kilometer freestyle
- Slalom
- Giant slalom

== Team scoring ==
Championships site

Rank	Team	Points
1st place, gold medalist(s)	Vermont (DC)	671
2nd place, silver medalist(s)	Utah	571
3rd place, bronze medalist(s)	Colorado	532
4	Wyoming	477
5	Dartmouth	476
6	New Mexico	409
7	Middlebury	394
8	Williams	290
9	Alaska Anchorage	372
10	New Hampshire	190
11	St. Lawrence	129
12	Bates	17
13	Keene State	14
14	Colby	10
15	MIT	23

- DC – Defending champions

== See also ==
- List of NCAA skiing programs
