= 1994 NCAA Skiing Championships =

American college skiing competition

Tournament information
- Sport: College skiing
- Location: Carrabassett Valley, Maine
- Administrator: NCAA
- Venue: Sugarloaf Ski Resort
- Teams: 18
- Number of events: 8

Final positions
- Champions: Vermont (5th overall, 4th co-ed)
- 1st runners-up: Utah
- 2nd runners-up: New Mexico

The 1994 NCAA Skiing Championships were contested at Sugarloaf ski resort in Carrabassett Valley, Maine as the 40th annual NCAA-sanctioned ski tournament to determine the individual and team national champions of men's and women's collegiate slalom and cross-country skiing in the United States.

Vermont, coached by Chip LaCasse, won the team championship, the Catamounts' fifth title overall and fourth as a co-ed team.

== Venue ==
This year's championships were contested at the Sugarloaf Resort in Carrabassett Valley, Maine

These were the second championships held at Sugarloaf (previously 1967) and third in the state of Maine (1967 and 1976).

== Program ==
=== Men's events ===
- Cross country, 10 kilometer classical
- Cross country, 20 kilometer freestyle
- Slalom
- Giant slalom

=== Women's events ===
- Cross country, 5 kilometer classical
- Cross country, 15 kilometer freestyle
- Slalom
- Giant slalom

== Team scoring ==
Championships site

Rank	Team	Points
1st place, gold medalist(s)	Vermont	688
2nd place, silver medalist(s)	Utah (DC)	667
3rd place, bronze medalist(s)	New Mexico	659
4	Colorado	622
5	Middlebury	449
6	Alaska Anchorage	443
7	Denver	438
8	New Hampshire	381
9	Northern Michigan	357
10	Dartmouth	350
11	Western State (CO)	339
12	Williams	204
13	Bates	185
14	St. Lawrence	97
15	Alaska Fairbanks	73
16	Wisconsin	46
17	Montana State	32
18	Massachusetts	11

- DC – Defending champions

== See also ==
- List of NCAA skiing programs
- Lake Placid, New York
