= 1960 NCAA skiing championships =

American college skiing competition

Coordinates: 45.818°N 110.897°W

1960 NCAA Skiing Championships

Tournament information
- Sport: College skiing
- Location: Bozeman, Montana
- Dates: March 24–26, 1960
- Administrator: NCAA
- Host: Montana State College
- Venue: Bridger Bowl
- Teams: 7
- Number of events: 4 (7 titles)

Final positions
- Champions: Colorado (2nd title)
- 1st runners-up: Denver
- 2nd runners-up: Dartmouth

The 1960 NCAA Skiing Championships were contested at Bridger Bowl near Bozeman, Montana, at the seventh annual NCAA-sanctioned ski tournament to determine the individual and team national champions of men's collegiate alpine skiing, cross-country skiing, and ski jumping in the United States. Montana State College served as the hosts.

Colorado, coached by Bob Beattie, repeated as national champions, again edging out rival Denver in the team standings. This was the second title for the Buffaloes.

There were no repeat individual champions this year, but downhill winner Dave Butts of Colorado won his third title; the McCall, Idaho native took the jumping and Skimeister honors the previous year.

== Venue ==
Location in the United States

This year's championships were held March 24–26 in Montana at Bridger Bowl, north of Bozeman. Montana State College, located in Bozeman, served as hosts.

The seventh edition of the championships, these were the first in Montana.

== Team scoring ==
Rank	Team	Points
1st place, gold medalist(s)	Colorado	571.4
2nd place, silver medalist(s)	Denver	568.6
3rd place, bronze medalist(s)	Dartmouth	561.2
4	Wyoming	501.9
5	Nevada	456.4
6	Western State	489.5
7	Washington State	231.3

== Individual events ==
Location in Montana

Four events were held, which yielded seven individual titles.

- Thursday: Slalom
- Friday: Downhill, Cross Country
- Saturday: Jumping

Event	Champion		
Event	Skier	Team	Time/Score
Alpine	Jim Gaddis	Utah	1:39.0
Cross Country	John Dendahl	Colorado	58:13
Downhill	Dave Butts	Colorado	1:27.0
Jumping	Dag Helgestad	Washington State	100.0
Nordic	John Dendahl	Colorado	1:36.4
Skimeister	John Dendahl	Colorado	378.6
Slalom	Rudy Ruana	Montana	1:50.10

== See also ==
- List of NCAA skiing programs
