= 1984 NCAA Skiing Championships =

American college skiing competition

Tournament information
- Sport: College skiing
- Location: Jackson, New Hampshire
- Administrator: NCAA
- Venue(s): Wildcat Mountain Ski Area
- Teams: 17

Final positions
- Champions: Utah (3rd title)
- 1st runners-up: Vermont
- 2nd runners-up: New Mexico

The 1984 NCAA Skiing Championships were contested at the Wildcat Mountain Ski Area in Jackson, New Hampshire as part of the 31st annual NCAA-sanctioned ski tournament to determine the individual and team national champions of men's and women's collegiate slalom skiing and cross-country skiing in the United States.

Defending champions Utah, coached by Phil Miller, claimed their third team national championship, 66.5 points ahead of Vermont in the cumulative team standings.

== Venue ==
Championships site

This year's NCAA skiing championships were hosted at the Wildcat Mountain Ski Area near Jackson, New Hampshire.

These were the fifth championships held in the state of New Hampshire (1958, 1964, 1970, 1978, and 1984).

== Team scoring ==
Rank	Team	Points
1st place, gold medalist(s)	Utah	750.5
2nd place, silver medalist(s)	Vermont	684
3rd place, bronze medalist(s)	New Mexico	580
4	Colorado	556
5	Wyoming	512
6	Dartmouth	491
7	New Hampshire	326.5
8	Middlebury	326
9	Montana State	294
10	St. Lawrence	224.5
11	Williams	157.5
12	Alaska–Fairbanks	88.5
13	Nevada–Reno	59
14	Alaska–Anchorage	52
15	Bates	45
16	New England College	34
17	Western State	5

== See also ==
- List of NCAA skiing programs
