= 2007 NCAA Skiing Championships =

American college skiing competition

Tournament information
- Sport: College skiing
- Location: Jackson, New Hampshire
- Administrator: NCAA
- Host(s): University of New Hampshire
- Venue(s): Wildcat Mountain Ski Area
- Teams: 22
- Number of events: 8

Final positions
- Champions: Dartmouth (1st overall, 1st co-ed)
- 1st runners-up: Denver
- 2nd runners-up: Colorado

The 2007 NCAA Skiing Championships were contested at the Wildcat Mountain Ski Area in Jackson, New Hampshire as part of the 54th annual NCAA-sanctioned ski tournament to determine the individual and team national champions of men's and women's collegiate slalom and cross-country skiing in the United States.

Dartmouth, coached by Cami Thompson, won the team championship, the Big Green's first co-ed title and first overall title.

== Venue ==
This year's NCAA skiing championships were hosted by the Wildcat Mountain Ski Area near Jackson, New Hampshire.

== Program ==
=== Men's events ===
- Cross country, 10 kilometer freestyle
- Cross country, 20 kilometer classical
- Slalom
- Giant slalom

=== Women's events ===
- Cross country, 5 kilometer freestyle
- Cross country, 15 kilometer classical
- Slalom
- Giant slalom

== Team scoring ==
Championships site

Rank	Team	Points
1st place, gold medalist(s)	Dartmouth	698
2nd place, silver medalist(s)	Denver	648
3rd place, bronze medalist(s)	Colorado (DC)	592
4	Utah	536
5	Vermont	400 1/2
T6	Middlebury	390
T6	New Mexico	390
8	Northern Michigan	380
9	Montana State	310
10	Nevada	288 1/2
11	New Hampshire	255
12	Alaska Anchorage	243
13	Bates	231
14	Alaska Fairbanks	217
15	Williams	152
16	Colby	134
17	Michigan Tech	128
18	Western State	78
19	Whitman	35
20	St. Lawrence	32
21	St. Olaf	25
22	Wisconsin Green Bay	8

- DC – Defending champions
- Debut team appearance

== See also ==
- List of NCAA skiing programs
