= 1980 NCAA Skiing Championships =

American college skiing competition

Tournament information
- Sport: College skiing
- Location: (New York (state)) Lake Placid, New York; Stowe, Vermont
- Administrator: NCAA
- Venue(s): Whiteface Ski Resort (NY); Stowe Mountain Resort (VT)
- Teams: 13

Final positions
- Champions: Vermont (1st title)
- 1st runners-up: Utah
- 2nd runners-up: Colorado

The 1980 NCAA Skiing Championships were contested at both the Whiteface Ski Resort at Lake Placid, New York, and the Stowe Mountain Resort in Stowe, Vermont, as part of the 27th annual NCAA-sanctioned ski tournament to determine the individual and team national champions of men's collegiate slalom skiing, cross-country skiing, and ski jumping in the United States.

Vermont, coached by Chip LaCasse, claimed their first team national championship, finishing 20 points ahead of Utah in the cumulative team standings.

== Events ==
This was the final year that ski jumping was included in the event program.

== Venue ==
1980 NCAA Skiing Championships site

This year's NCAA skiing championships were co-hosted at the Whiteface Ski Resort in Lake Placid, New York, and the Stowe Mountain Resort in Stowe, Vermont.

These were the first championships held in the state of New York and fourth in Vermont (1955, 1961, 1973, and 1980).

== Team scoring ==
Rank	Team	Points
1st place, gold medalist(s)	Vermont	171
2nd place, silver medalist(s)	Utah	151
3rd place, bronze medalist(s)	Colorado	98
4	Northern Michigan	92
5	Dartmouth	88
6	Middlebury	86
7	Wyoming	82
8	Montana State	15
9	New Hampshire	14
10	St. Lawrence	10
11	New Mexico	8
12	Minnesota	4
13	Nevada–Reno	3

== See also ==
- List of NCAA skiing programs
