= 1954 NCAA skiing championships =

American college skiing competition

Coordinates: 39.318°N 119.872°W

1954 NCAA Skiing Championships

Tournament information
- Sport: College skiing
- Location: Reno, Nevada
- Dates: March 4–7, 1954
- Administrator: NCAA
- Host: University of Nevada
- Venue: Slide Mountain
- Teams: 10
- Number of events: 4 (5 titles)

Final positions
- Champions: Denver (1st title)
- 1st runners-up: Seattle
- 2nd runners-up: Colorado

Location in the United States
Location in Nevada

The 1954 NCAA Skiing Championships were contested at the first annual NCAA-sanctioned ski tournament to determine the individual and team national champions of men's collegiate alpine and cross-country skiing in the United States. This championships were held March 4–7 at Slide Mountain outside Reno, Nevada, hosted by the University of Nevada.

Denver finished ahead of Seattle to claim the team championship; the Pioneers were coached by Willy Schaeffler. Nevada senior Pat Myers won the downhill, edging out Olympian Darrell Robison of Utah.

== Team scoring ==
| Rank | Team | Points |
|---|---|---|
| 1st place, gold medalist(s) | Denver | 384.0 |
| 2nd place, silver medalist(s) | Seattle | 349.6 |
| 3rd place, bronze medalist(s) | Colorado | 348.6 |
| 4 | Idaho | 348.5 |
| 5 | Wyoming | 347.6 |
| 6 | Utah | 343.5 |
| 7 | Washington State | 338.0 |
| 8 | Nevada (H) | 302.6 |
| 9 | Washington | 290.0 |
| 10 | Stanford | 157.8 |

- (H) = Hosts
- Teams declared ineligible were Western State and Whitman.

== Individual events ==
Four events were held, which yielded five individual titles.

- Thursday: Cross Country
- Friday: Downhill
- Saturday: Slalom
- Sunday: Jumping

| Event | Champion | | |
| Event | Skier | Team | Time/Score |
|---|---|---|---|
| Cross-country | Marvin Crawford | Denver | 50:09.0 |
| Downhill | Pat Myers | Nevada | 1:46.40 |
| Jumping | Willis Olson | Denver | 213.3 |
| Skimeister | Marvin Crawford | Denver | 383.5 |
| Slalom | (Norway) John L’Orange | Denver | 2:07.90 |
