= 1981 NCAA Skiing Championships =

American college skiing competition

Tournament information
- Sport: College skiing
- Location: Park City, Utah
- Administrator: NCAA
- Venue(s): Park City Mountain Resort
- Teams: 13

Final positions
- Champions: Utah (1st title)
- 1st runners-up: Vermont
- 2nd runners-up: Colorado

The 1981 NCAA Skiing Championships were contested at the Park City Mountain Resort in Park City, Utah as part of the 28th annual NCAA-sanctioned ski tournament to determine the individual and team national champions of men's collegiate slalom skiing, and cross-country skiing in the United States.

Utah, coached by Pat Miller, claimed their first team national championship, finishing 11 points ahead of defending champions Vermont in the cumulative team standings.

== Events ==
One event was added to the program this year:

- Men's crossing country relay

== Venue ==
1981 NCAA Skiing Championships site

This year's NCAA skiing championships were held at the Park City Mountain Resort in Park City, Utah.

These were the third championships held in the state of Utah (1957 and 1963).

== Team scoring ==
Rank	Team	Points
1st place, gold medalist(s)	Utah	183
2nd place, silver medalist(s)	Vermont	172
3rd place, bronze medalist(s)	Colorado	113
4	Wyoming	105.5
5	Middlebury	57
6	Montana State	52.5
7	Alaska–Anchorage	46
8	Dartmouth	32
9	Northern Michigan	26
10	Alaska–Fairbanks	22
11	Minnesota	16
12	New Hampshire	11
13	St. Lawrence	4
14	Williams	1

== See also ==
- List of NCAA skiing programs
