= 1991 NCAA Skiing Championships =

Skiing championships

Tournament information
- Sport: College skiing
- Location: Park City, Utah
- Administrator: NCAA
- Venue(s): Park City Mountain Resort
- Teams: 16
- Number of events: 8

Final positions
- Champions: Colorado (12th title, 1st co-ed)
- 1st runners-up: Vermont
- 2nd runners-up: Utah

The 1991 NCAA Skiing Championships were contested at the Park City Mountain Resort in Park City, Utah as the 38th annual NCAA-sanctioned ski tournament to determine the individual and team national champions of men's and women's collegiate slalom and cross-country skiing in the United States.

Colorado, coached by Richard Rokos, claimed their twelfth overall team championship and first as a co-ed team.

== Venue ==
This year's NCAA skiing championships were held at the Park City Mountain Resort in Park City, Utah.

These were the fourth championships held in the state of Utah (previously 1957, 1963, and 1981).

== Program ==
=== Men's events ===
- Cross country, 20 kilometer classical
- Cross country, 10 kilometer freestyle
- Slalom
- Giant slalom

=== Women's events ===
- Cross country, 15 kilometer classical
- Cross country, 5 kilometer freestyle
- Slalom
- Giant slalom

== Team scoring ==
NCAA Skiing Championships site

Rank	Team	Points
1st place, gold medalist(s)	Colorado	713
2nd place, silver medalist(s)	Vermont (DC)	682
3rd place, bronze medalist(s)	Utah	615
4	Wyoming	574
5	Dartmouth	492
6	New Mexico	458
7	Alaska Anchorage	431
8	Williams	345
9	Middlebury	340
10	New Hampshire	300
11	St. Lawrence	130
12	St. Olaf	49
13	Bates	35
14	Wisconsin	33
15	Keene State	25
16	Colby	23

- DC – Defending champions

== See also ==
- List of NCAA skiing programs
