= 1995 NCAA Skiing Championships =

American college skiing competition

Tournament information
- Sport: College skiing
- Location: Jackson, New Hampshire
- Administrator: NCAA
- Host(s): University of New Hampshire
- Venue(s): Wildcat Mountain Ski Area
- Teams: 21
- Number of events: 8

Final positions
- Champions: Colorado (13th overall, 2nd co-ed)
- 1st runners-up: Utah
- 2nd runners-up: Vermont

The 1995 NCAA Skiing Championships were contested at the Wildcat Mountain Ski Area in Jackson, New Hampshire as the 42nd annual NCAA-sanctioned ski tournament to determine the individual and team national champions of men's and women's collegiate slalom and cross-country skiing in the United States.

Colorado, coached by Richard Rokos, won the team championship, the Buffaloes' thirteenth title overall and second as a co-ed team.

== Venue ==
This year's NCAA skiing championships were hosted by the Wildcat Mountain Ski Area near Jackson, New Hampshire.

These were the seventh championships held in the state of New Hampshire (previously 1958, 1964, 1970, 1978, 1984, and 1992).

== Program ==
=== Men's events ===
- Cross country, 20 kilometer classical
- Cross country, 10 kilometer freestyle
- Slalom
- Giant slalom

=== Women's events ===
- Cross country, 15 kilometer classical
- Cross country, 5 kilometer freestyle
- Slalom
- Giant slalom

== Team scoring ==
Championships site

Rank	Team	Points
1st place, gold medalist(s)	Colorado	720 1/2
2nd place, silver medalist(s)	Utah	711
3rd place, bronze medalist(s)	Vermont (DC)	567
4	Denver	505
5	Dartmouth	462
6	Western State (CO)	447 1/2
7	New Mexico	440
8	Alaska Anchorage	411 1/2
9	New Hampshire	345
10	Middlebury	310 1/2
11	Northern Michigan	206
12	Bates	167
13	Williams	152
14	Alaska Fairbanks	124
15	Nevada	84
16	Wisconsin–Green Bay	36
17	Harvard; St. Lawrence	33
19	Johnson State	17
20	Bowdoin	11
21	Michigan Tech	10

- DC – Defending champions

== See also ==
- List of NCAA skiing programs
