= 1986 NCAA skiing championships =

American college skiing competition

1986 NCAA Skiing Championships

Tournament information
- Sport: College skiing
- Location: Stowe, Vermont
- Administrator: NCAA
- Venue(s): Stowe Mountain Resort
- Teams: 18
- Number of events: 8

Final positions
- Champions: Utah (4th title)
- 1st runners-up: Vermont
- 2nd runners-up: Wyoming

The 1986 NCAA Skiing Championships were contested at the Stowe Mountain Resort in Stowe, Vermont as part of the 33rd annual NCAA-sanctioned ski tournament to determine the individual and team national champions of men's and women's collegiate slalom skiing and cross-country skiing in the United States.

Utah, coached by Pat Miller, claimed their fourth team national championship, ten points ahead of Vermont in the cumulative team standings.

== Venue ==
This year's NCAA skiing championships were hosted at the Stowe Mountain Resort in Stowe, Vermont

These were the fifth championships held in the state of Vermont (1955, 1961, 1973, 1980, and 1986).

== Program ==
=== Men's events ===
- Slalom
- Giant slalom
- Cross country
- Cross country relay

=== Women's events ===
- Slalom
- Giant slalom
- Cross country
- Cross country relay

== Team scoring ==
Championships site

Rank	Team	Points
1st place, gold medalist(s)	Utah	612
2nd place, silver medalist(s)	Vermont	602
3rd place, bronze medalist(s)	Wyoming	554
4	Colorado	543
5	Middlebury	431
6	New Mexico	409
7	Dartmouth	342
8	New Hampshire	226
9	Alaska Anchorage	190
10	Montana State	136
11	St. Lawrence	98
12	Williams	52
13	Nevada–Reno	49
14	Alaska Fairbanks	39
15	New England College	18
16	Bates	16
17	Western State	15
18	Keene State	6

== See also ==
- List of NCAA skiing programs
