= 1992 NCAA Skiing Championships =

American collegiate skiing tournament

Tournament information
- Sport: College skiing
- Location: Jackson, New Hampshire
- Administrator: NCAA
- Host(s): University of New Hampshire
- Venue(s): Wildcat Mountain Ski Area
- Teams: 19
- Number of events: 8

Final positions
- Champions: Vermont (4th overall, 3rd co-ed)
- 1st runners-up: New Mexico
- 2nd runners-up: Utah

The 1992 NCAA Skiing Championships were contested at the Wildcat Mountain Ski Area in Jackson, New Hampshire as the 39th annual NCAA-sanctioned ski tournament to determine the individual and team national champions of men's and women's collegiate slalom and cross-country skiing in the United States.

Vermont, coached by Chip LaCasse, claimed their fourth overall team championship and third as a co-ed team.

== Venue ==
This year's NCAA skiing championships were hosted by the Wildcat Mountain Ski Area near Jackson, New Hampshire.

These were the sixth championships held in the state of New Hampshire (previously 1958, 1964, 1970, 1978, and 1984).

== Program ==
=== Men's events ===
- Cross country, 20 kilometer classical
- Cross country, 10 kilometer freestyle
- Slalom
- Giant slalom

=== Women's events ===
- Cross country, 15 kilometer classical
- Cross country, 5 kilometer freestyle
- Slalom
- Giant slalom

== Team scoring ==
Championships site

Rank	Team	Points
1st place, gold medalist(s)	Vermont	693 1/2
2nd place, silver medalist(s)	New Mexico	642 1/2
3rd place, bronze medalist(s)	Utah	626
4	Dartmouth	621 1/2
5	Colorado (DC)	590
6	Wyoming	585 1/2
7	Middlebury	518
8	Alaska Anchorage	506
9	New Hampshire	372
10	Northern Michigan	259
11	St. Lawrence	207
12	Williams	133
13	Alaska Fairbanks	120
14	Michigan Tech	70
15	Bates	38
16	St. Olaf	30
17	Wisconsin–Green Bay	23
18	Castleton	8
19	Harvard	7

- DC – Defending champions

== See also ==
- List of NCAA skiing programs
