= 1989 NCAA Skiing Championships =

American college skiing competition

Tournament information
- Sport: College skiing
- Location: Teton Village, Wyoming
- Administrator: NCAA
- Venue: Jackson Hole Mountain Resort
- Teams: 17
- Number of events: 8

Final positions
- Champions: Vermont (2nd title)
- 1st runners-up: Utah
- 2nd runners-up: Colorado

The 1989 NCAA Skiing Championships were contested at the Jackson Hole Mountain Resort in Jackson Hole, Wyoming as the 36th annual NCAA-sanctioned ski tournament to determine the individual and team national champions of men's and women's collegiate slalom and cross-country skiing in the United States.

Vermont, coached by Chip LaCasse, claimed their second team national championship, just four points ahead of three-time defending champions Utah in the cumulative team standings.

== Venue ==
This year's championships were contested at the Jackson Hole Mountain Resort in Jackson Hole, Wyoming. These were the second NCAA championships held at Jackson Hole as well as the second in the state of Wyoming (1974 and 1989).

== Program ==
=== Men's events ===
- Cross country, 10 kilometer classical
- Cross country, 20 kilometer freestyle
- Slalom
- Giant slalom

=== Women's events ===
- Cross country, 10 kilometer classical
- Cross country, 20 kilometer freestyle
- Slalom
- Giant slalom

== Team scoring ==
Championships site

Rank	Team	Points
1st place, gold medalist(s)	Vermont	672
2nd place, silver medalist(s)	Utah (DC)	668
3rd place, bronze medalist(s)	Colorado	600 1/2
4	Wyoming	592
5	New Mexico	520
6	Alaska Anchorage	459 1/2
7	Middlebury	439
8	Dartmouth	403
9	Williams	372
10	New Hampshire	221
11	St. Lawrence	101
12	Alaska Fairbanks	66
13	Keene State	47
14	Castleton State	24
15	Colby	23
16	Bates	12
17	New England College	8

- DC – Defending champions

== See also ==
- List of NCAA skiing programs
