= 1965 NCAA skiing championships =

American college skiing competition

Coordinates: 46.93°N 121.48°W

1965 NCAA Skiing Championships

Tournament information
- Sport: College skiing
- Location: (Washington (state)) Mount Baker-Snoqualmie National Forest, Pierce County, Washington
- Dates: March 25–28, 1965
- Administrator: NCAA
- Host: Washington
- Venue: Crystal Mountain
- Teams: 17
- Number of events: 4 (7 titles)

Final positions
- Champions: Denver (9th title)
- 1st runners-up: Utah
- 2nd runners-up: Western State

The 1965 NCAA Skiing Championships were contested at the Crystal Mountain ski area in the Mount Baker-Snoqualmie National Forest in Pierce County, Washington at the twelfth annual NCAA-sanctioned ski tournament to determine the individual and team national champions of men's collegiate alpine skiing, cross-country skiing, and ski jumping in the United States.

Denver, coached by Willy Schaeffler, captured their ninth, and fifth consecutive, national championship, edging out Utah in the team standings. The downhill title went to Bill Marolt of Colorado, and Rick Chaffee of Denver won the slalom and the combined.

== Venue ==
This year's championships were held March 25–28 in Washington at Crystal Mountain, located in the Mount Baker-Snoqualmie National Forest in Pierce County, southeast of Seattle. Opened in late 1962, the ski area was completing its third season.

The twelfth edition, these were the first championships held in Washington and the first in the Cascade Range.

== Team scoring ==
Location in the United States
Location in Washington

Rank	Team	Points
1st place, gold medalist(s)	Denver	380.5
2nd place, silver medalist(s)	Utah	378.4
3rd place, bronze medalist(s)	Western State	367.3
4	Dartmouth	360.3
5	Washington	344.9
6	Colorado	300.7
7	Nevada–Reno	294.8
8	Idaho	190.5
9	Fort Lewis	114.6
10	Harvard	91.9
11	Montana	74.7
12	Middlebury	65.8
13	Vermont	59.4
14	Williams	30.3
15	Michigan Tech	29.8
16	Montana State	0.33
17	Wyoming	0.27

== Individual events ==
Four events were held, which yielded seven individual titles.

- Thursday: Cross Country
- Friday: Slalom
- Saturday: Downhill
- Sunday: Jumping

Event	Champion		
Event	Skier	Team	Time/Score
Alpine	Rick Chaffee	Denver	2:49.4
Cross Country	Mike Elliott	Fort Lewis	55:34
Downhill	Bill Marolt (2)	Colorado	2:11.89
Jumping	(Norway) Erik Jansen (2)	Denver	219.8
Nordic	(Norway) Matz Jenssen	Utah	7:31.65
Skimeister	Loris Werner	Western State	356.6
Slalom	Rick Chaffee	Denver	1:48.25

== See also ==
- List of NCAA skiing programs
