= 2000 NCAA Skiing Championships =

American college skiing competition

Tournament information
- Sport: College skiing
- Location: Park City, Utah
- Administrator: NCAA
- Venue(s): Park City Mountain Resort
- Teams: 20
- Number of events: 8

Final positions
- Champions: Denver (15th overall, 1st co-ed)
- 1st runners-up: Colorado
- 2nd runners-up: Vermont

The 2000 NCAA Skiing Championships were contested at the Park City Mountain Resort in Park City, Utah as the 47th annual NCAA-sanctioned ski tournament to determine the individual and team national champions of men's and women's collegiate slalom and cross-country skiing in the United States.

Denver, coached by Kurt Smitz, won the team championship, the Pioneers' first co-ed title and fifteenth overall.

== Venue ==
The championships were held at the Park City Mountain Resort in Park City, Utah.

These were the fifth championships held in the state of Utah (previously 1957, 1963, 1981, and 1991).

== Program ==
=== Men's events ===
- Cross country, 10 kilometer freestyle
- Cross country, 20 kilometer classical
- Slalom
- Giant slalom

=== Women's events ===
- Cross country, 5 kilometer freestyle
- Cross country, 15 kilometer classical
- Slalom
- Giant slalom

== Team scoring ==
NCAA Skiing Championships site

Rank	Team	Points
1st place, gold medalist(s)	Denver	720
2nd place, silver medalist(s)	Colorado (DC)	621
3rd place, bronze medalist(s)	Vermont	592
4	Utah	555
5	New Mexico	551
6	Middlebury	500
7	Dartmouth	439
8	New Hampshire	391
9	Northern Michigan	312
10	Alaska Anchorage	273
11	Nevada	272
12	Williams	230
13	St. Lawrence	110
14	Wisconsin–Green Bay	106
15	Western State	105
16	Bates	91
17	Montana State	54
18	Colby	35
19	Saint Michael's	28
20	St. Olaf	17

- DC – Defending champions
- Debut team appearance

== See also ==
- List of NCAA skiing programs
