= 1956 NCAA skiing championships =

American college skiing competition

Coordinates: 39.887°N 105.763°W

1956 NCAA Skiing Championships

Tournament information
- Sport: College skiing
- Location: Winter Park, Colorado
- Dates: March 23–25, 1956
- Administrator: NCAA
- Host(s): Colorado, Denver
- Venue: Winter Park Ski Area
- Teams: 13
- Number of events: 4 (7 titles)

Final positions
- Champions: Denver (3rd title)
- 1st runners-up: Dartmouth
- 2nd runners-up: Middlebury

The 1956 NCAA Skiing Championships were contested in Winter Park, Colorado at the third annual NCAA-sanctioned ski tournament to determine the individual and team national champions of men's collegiate alpine skiing, cross-country skiing, and ski jumping in the United States.

Led by coach Willy Schaeffler, co-host Denver claimed their third national championship in as many years, with Dartmouth repeating as the runner-up in the team standings.

Repeat individual champions were Dartmouth's Chiharu Igaya (Alpine, Slalom), Denver's Willis Olson (Jumping, third consecutive), and Idaho's Eirik Berggren (Nordic). Less than two months earlier, Igaya was the silver medalist in slalom at the 1956 Winter Olympics in Cortina d'Ampezzo, Italy.

== Venue ==
Location in the United States
Location in Colorado

This year's championships were held March 23–25 in Colorado at Winter Park, west of Denver.

The third edition, these were the first NCAA championships in Colorado and the Rocky Mountains.

== Team scoring ==
Rank	Team	Points
1st place, gold medalist(s)	Denver	582.01
2nd place, silver medalist(s)	Dartmouth	541.77
3rd place, bronze medalist(s)	Middlebury	541.28
4	Western State (CO)	531.58
5	Idaho	528.63
6	Colorado	520.62
7	Utah	504.61
8	Washington	502.25
9	Vermont	473.51
10	Washington State	472.67
11	Wyoming	470.15
12	Michigan Tech	446.99
13	California	389.63

== Individual events ==
Four events were held, which yielded seven individual titles.

- Friday: Slalom
- Saturday: Downhill, Cross Country
- Sunday: Jumping

Event	Champion		
Event	Skier	Team	Time/Score
Alpine	(Japan) Chiharu Igaya (2)	Dartmouth	3:02.0
Cross Country	(Norway) Eirik Berggren	Idaho	58:27.8
Downhill	Walt Taulbee	Washington	1:30.6
Jumping	Willis Olson (3)	Denver	220.8
Nordic	(Norway) Eirik Berggren (2)	Idaho	7:21.2
Skimeister	John Cress	Denver	369.23
Slalom	(Japan) Chiharu Igaya (2)	Dartmouth	2:07.8

== See also ==
- List of NCAA skiing programs
