= 1967 NCAA skiing championships =

American college skiing competition

Coordinates: 45.053°N 70.310°W

1967 NCAA Skiing Championships

Tournament information
- Sport: College skiing
- Location: Carrabassett Valley, Maine
- Dates: March 2–4, 1967
- Administrator: NCAA
- Venue: Sugarloaf
- Teams: 12
- Number of events: 4 (7 titles)

Final positions
- Champions: Denver (11th title)
- 1st runners-up: Wyoming
- 2nd runners-up: Dartmouth

The 1967 NCAA Skiing Championships were contested at Sugarloaf ski area in Carrabassett Valley, Maine at the 14th annual NCAA-sanctioned ski tournament to determine the individual and team national champions of men's collegiate alpine skiing, cross-country skiing, and ski jumping in the United States.

Denver, coached by Willy Schaeffler, captured their eleventh, and seventh consecutive, national championship, edging Wyoming by less than a point in the team standings.

No individual champions from the previous year repeated, but two reclaimed titles won two years earlier, Rick Chaffee (slalom) and Matz Jennsen (nordic).

== Venue ==
This year's championships were held March 2–4 in Maine at Sugarloaf in Carrabassett Valley.

The fourteenth edition, these were the first championships in Maine and the fifth in the East; the previous eastern sites were in New Hampshire and Vermont.

== Team scoring ==
Location in the United States

Rank	Team	Points
1st place, gold medalist(s)	Denver	376.7
2nd place, silver medalist(s)	Wyoming	375.9
3rd place, bronze medalist(s)	Dartmouth	374.0
4	Utah	366.5
5	Western State	362.2
6	Middlebury	356.1
7	Washington	354.5
8	Williams	342.6
9	Harvard	336.4
10	Colby	320.0
11	St. Lawrence	292.0
12	Maine	291.2

== Individual events ==
Location in Maine

Four events were held, which yielded seven individual titles.

- Thursday: Slalom
- Friday: Downhill, Cross Country
- Saturday: Jumping

Event	Champion		
Event	Skier	Team	Time/Score
Alpine	(Norway) Terje Øverland	Denver	4:25.83
Cross Country	(United States) Ned Gillette	Dartmouth	64:07
Downhill	(United States) Dennis McCoy	Denver	2:11.20
Jumping	(Norway) Bjorn Loken	Utah	213.5
Nordic	(Norway) Matz Jenssen (2)	Utah	7:10.5
Skimeister	(Norway) Matz Jenssen	Utah	365.2
Slalom	(United States) Rick Chaffee (2)	Denver	1:21.96

== See also ==
- List of NCAA skiing programs
