= 1955 NCAA skiing championships =

American college skiing competition

Coordinates: 44.139°N 72.655°W

1955 NCAA Skiing Championships

Tournament information
- Sport: College skiing
- Location: Northfield, Vermont
- Dates: March 4–6, 1955
- Administrator: NCAA
- Host: Norwich University
- Venue: Norwich University Ski Area
- Teams: 13
- Number of events: 4 (7 titles)

Final positions
- Champions: Denver (2nd title)
- 1st runners-up: Dartmouth
- 2nd runners-up: Middlebury

Location in the United States
Location in Vermont

The 1955 NCAA Skiing Championships were contested in Northfield, Vermont at the second annual NCAA-sanctioned ski tournament to determine the individual and team national champions of men's collegiate alpine skiing, cross-country skiing, and ski jumping in the United States.

Denver, coached by Willy Schaeffler, repeated as national champions, topping Dartmouth in the team standings.

== Highlights ==
- As a result of the event's location in the East, six programs participated for the first time: Dartmouth, Middlebury, New Hampshire, Norwich, Vermont, and Williams
- Two new individual titles were added to the championship: Alpine (downhill, slalom) and Nordic (cross country, jumping)
- Dartmouth's Chiharu Igaya, a Japanese national, claimed three of the individual titles: alpine, downhill, and slalom
- Denver ski jumper Willis Olson repeated as national champion in his event, the first collegiate skier to accomplish this feat

== Venue ==
This year's championships were contested in Vermont at the Norwich University Ski Area in Northfield. The second edition, it was the first in the Eastern United States.

The NU ski area had a vertical drop of approximately 900 feet (270 m) and closed in 1992.

== Team scoring ==
Rank	Team	Points
1st place, gold medalist(s)	Denver	567.050
2nd place, silver medalist(s)	Dartmouth	558.935
3rd place, bronze medalist(s)	Middlebury	546.878
4	Colorado	540.926
5	New Hampshire	534.663
6	Vermont	530.284
7	Utah	516.429
8	Wyoming	512.081
9	Williams	508.282
10	Norwich (H)	410.847
11	Washington State	373.400
12	Washington	257.018
13	Western State (CO)	91.235

- (H) = Hosts
- Idaho sent only two competitors; three were required for the team competition.

== Individual events ==
Four events were held, which yielded seven individual titles.

Event	Champion		
Event	Skier	Team	Time/Score
Alpine	(Japan) Chiharu Igaya	Dartmouth	4:16.7
Cross Country	Larry Damon	Vermont	54:10.2
Downhill	(Japan) Chiharu Igaya	Dartmouth	2:09.3
Jumping	Willis Olson (2)	Denver	204.9
Nordic	(Norway) Eirik Berggren	Idaho	7:12.1
Skimeister	Les Streeter	Middlebury	368.2
Slalom	(Japan) Chiharu Igaya	Dartmouth	2:07.4
