= Central Collegiate Ski Association =

The Central Collegiate Ski Association (CCSA) is an NCAA skiing-only conference. As the NCAA does not have divisions in skiing, it is composed of NCAA Division I, Division II, and Division III schools, as well as one community college. Members are located in Michigan, Minnesota and Wisconsin. The conference is organized for Nordic skiing only.

== Members ==
The following schools are CCSA members:

- College of St. Scholastica
- Michigan Tech University
- Northern Michigan University
- St. Cloud State University (women only)
- St. Olaf College
- University of Wisconsin – Green Bay

== Former Members ==
- University of Alaska Fairbanks Members from 1992 to 2015–16
