= Jay Rand =

American ski jumper

Jay Rand (born March 4, 1950, in Lake Placid, New York) is an American former ski jumper who competed at the 1968 Winter Olympics.
