= Clark Matis =

American cross-country skier (born 1946)

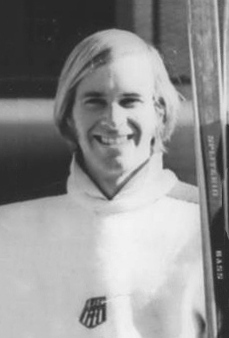
- Matis in 1972

Personal information
- Born: July 1, 1946 (age 80) Durango, Colorado, U.S.
- Height: 180 cm (5 ft 11 in)
- Weight: 64 kg (141 lb)

Sport
- Sport: Cross-country skiing
- Club: University of Colorado Racing Club

Clark Arvo Matis (born July 1, 1946) is a retired American cross-country skier. He competed in the 30 km event at the 1972 Winter Olympics and finished 53rd.

Matis' mother was the first female member of the University of Colorado ski team, and his father, Arvo Matis, headed the Durango Ski Club. Clark won the 1968 and 1969 NCAA cross-country championships, and was a member of the national skiing team in 1969–72. After retiring from competitions he became an executive with Skis Rossignol. In 1981 he co-founded Merrell, an outdoor shoe company. Around that time he designed boots and received multiple patents on shoe and boot designs.
