= Marvin Melville =

American alpine skier (born 1935)

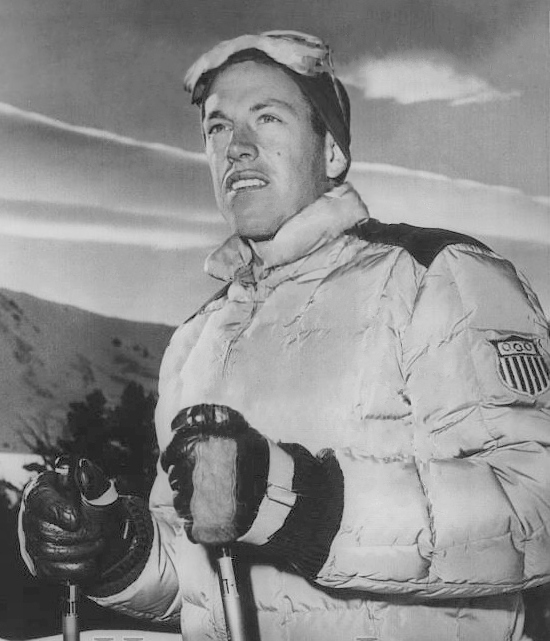
- Melville in 1959

Personal information
- Nationality: American
- Born: February 15, 1935 (age 90); Salt Lake City, Utah, United States

Sport
- Sport: Alpine skiing
- Club: University of Utah

Marvin Alton Melville (born February 15, 1935) is a retired American alpine skier. He competed in the downhill event at the 1956 and 1960 Winter Olympics and placed 22nd in 1960.

Melville won the 1959 NCAA championships in the slalom and combined events. During his skiing career, he worked in construction in the summers to earn money for competing in the winters. After retiring from skiing, he served in the army, and then ran his ski school for children and coached the University of Utah ski team.
