= Jim Miller (skier) =

American Nordic combined skier (born 1947)

Personal information
- Born: November 10, 1947 (age 78) Syracuse, New York, U.S.

Sport
- Sport: Nordic combined

Jim Miller (born November 10, 1947) is an American skier. He competed in the Nordic combined event at the 1968 Winter Olympics and the 1972 Winter Olympics.
