= Willis S. Olson =

American ski jumper (1930–2021)

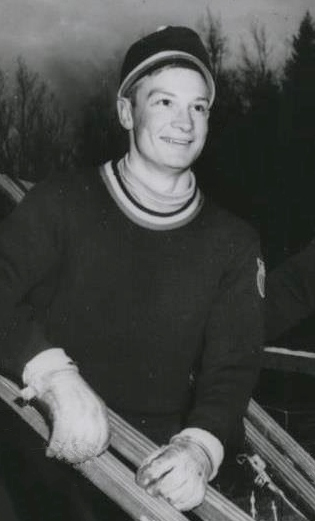
- Olson in 1954

Personal information
- Born: January 3, 1930 Eau Claire, Wisconsin, U.S.
- Died: April 9, 2021 (aged 91)

Sport
- Sport: Ski jumping
- Club: Denver Pioneers

Willis Stuart Olson (January 3, 1930 – April 9, 2021) was an American ski jumper. He competed in the normal hill at the 1952 and 1956 Winter Olympics and placed 22nd and 43rd, respectively. Olson won the NCAA ski jumping championships for the University of Denver in 1954-56 and another national title in 1958. In 1965 he moved to the veteran's category, winning the national veteran's championships in 1965, 1966 and 1968. Olson was inducted into the US Ski and Snowboard Hall of Fame in 1972.
