= Middlebury College Snow Bowl =

Ski area in Vermont, United States

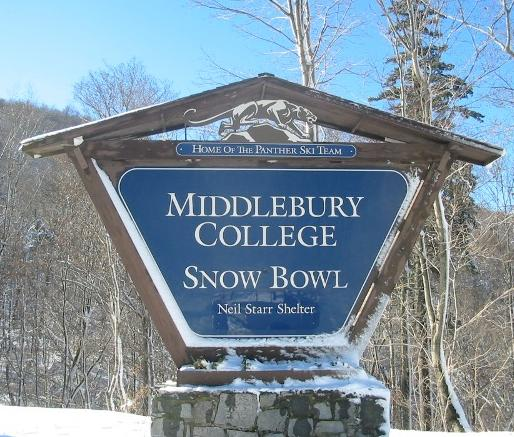
- Interactive map of Middlebury College Snow Bowl
- Location: Hancock, Vermont, US
- Coordinates: 43.94°N 72.96°W
- Vertical: 1,000 ft (300 m)
- Top elevation: 2,720 ft (830 m)
- Base elevation: 1,720 ft (520 m)
- Skiable area: 600 acres (2.4 km^{2})
- Trails: 17
- Lift system: 3 chairs
- Snowfall: 200 in (510 cm)
- Website: middleburysnowbowl.com

The Middlebury College Snowbowl is a ski area in Hancock, Vermont, 13 miles (21 km) east of Middlebury in the Green Mountains. The site has been owned and operated by Middlebury College since its first trails were cut in 1934. The Snowbowl has 17 trails and 3 lifts, offering access to more than 700 acres (2.8 km^{2}) of terrain. In 2006, it became the first carbon-neutral ski area in the United States.

== History ==
One of the second oldest ski areas in Vermont, the Snowbowl has hosted intercollegiate competitions since the 1930s. The original lodge—a traditional log cabin—was built in 1938 and remains the oldest standing base lodge in the nation.

== The Mountain ==
Located on the north slope of Worth Mountain, the Snowbowl rises near Middlebury Gap on land willed to Middlebury College by Joseph Battell in 1915. The property is surrounded by the Joseph Battell Wilderness, land once owned by the College but now part of the Green Mountain National Forest. The mountain features 600+ skiable acres, 100 acres of trails and 500 acres of skiable woods. Averaging 200 inches (5.1 m) of natural snowfall annually, additional snowmaking covers nearly half of all trails, including most terrain served by the Worth Mountain and Sheehan chairlifts. The Snowbowl's eastern face, colloquially known as "the backside", relies mainly on natural snow and is accessed by the Bailey Falls triple chairlift.

== Sustainability ==
Middlebury College Snowbowl carries on Middlebury College's commitment to creating a more sustainable world by implementing efficiency and electrification projects in all of their operations. For the Snowbowl, this has included switching to more efficient snow guns, an electric compressor, and installing more efficient lighting in the lodge.

The Snowbowl endeavors to electrify their vehicle fleet with electric snowmobiles and passenger cars. In the future, they are pursuing projects related to composting and renewable energy.
