= List of New England ski areas by vertical drop =

The following is a list of ski areas in New England by vertical drop. Unless otherwise noted, vertical drop figures are from Verticalfeet.com, vertical for Bolton Valley and Magic Mountain directly from their websites.

Rank	Resort name	State	Vertical (ft)	Skiable acres	Trails	Lifts	Notes
1	Killington	Vermont	3,050	1,509	155	21	Largest drop in New England, 26th largest drop in the United States
2	Sugarloaf	Maine	2,820	1,360	176	15	Largest drop in Maine
3	Smugglers' Notch	Vermont	2,564	1,000	78	8	Second largest drop in Vermont
4	Sugarbush	Vermont	2,552	581	111	16	
5	Stowe	Vermont	2,341	485	116	12	
6	Sunday River	Maine	2,340	870	135	20	Second largest drop in Maine
7	Cannon Mountain	New Hampshire	2,230	285	97	11	Largest drop in New Hampshire
8	Loon Mountain	New Hampshire	2,190	403	73	13	Second largest drop in New Hampshire
9	Jay Peak	Vermont	2,153	385	81	9	
10	Okemo Mountain	Vermont	2,100	632	119	19	
11	Wildcat Mountain	New Hampshire	2,027	225	48	5	
12	Burke Mountain	Vermont	2,011	267	50	4	Home to Burke Mountain Academy
13	Waterville Valley	New Hampshire	2,003	265	62	12	
14	Stratton Mountain	Vermont	2,003	670	99	11	
15	Saddleback	Maine	2,000	600	66	5	
16	Mad River Glen	Vermont	1,992	120	45	4	
17	Pico Mountain	Vermont	1,967	468	57	7	One of the first commercial ski resorts in Vermont.
18	Attitash	New Hampshire	1,750	310	75	13	
19	Bolton Valley	Vermont	1,703	300	71	6	
20	Mount Snow	Vermont	1,700	600	86	20	
21	Mount Sunapee	New Hampshire	1,510	233	65	10	
22	Bretton Woods	New Hampshire	1,500	464	101	9	
23	Magic Mountain	Vermont	1,500	195	40	4	
24	Tenney Mountain	New Hampshire	1,500	130	50	5	Vertical data from skitenney.com/about/mountain-information/
25	Gunstock Mountain	New Hampshire	1,400	227	50	6	Vertical data from Gunstock.com
26	Black Mountain	Maine	1,380	300	35	2	Vertical data from skiblackmountain.org
27	Bromley	Vermont	1,334	178	45	10	
28	Pleasant Mountain	Maine	1,300	249	40	5	
29	Ragged Mountain	New Hampshire	1,250	220	47	5	Vertical data from Wikipedia
30	Cranmore Mountain	New Hampshire	1,200	200	54	10	
31	Berkshire East	Massachusetts	1,180	180	45	6	Tallest vertical in Massachusetts
32	Mount Abram	Maine	1,150	450	44	5	
33	Jiminy Peak	Massachusetts	1,140	170	45	8	Second tallest in Massachusetts
34	Ski Butternut	Massachusetts	1,000	110	22	10	
35	Black Mountain	New Hampshire	1,110	143	40	4	
36	Middlebury College Snow Bowl	Vermont	1,040	110	17	3	
37	Crotched Mountain	New Hampshire	1,016	100	23	5	
38	Wachusett Mountain	Massachusetts	1,000	110	22	7	
39	Catamount	Massachusetts	1,000	100	43	7	Ski area crosses the MA/NY state border
40	Bigrock	Maine	980	60	28	5	
41	Dartmouth Skiway	New Hampshire	968	107	31	4	
42	Camden Snow Bowl	Maine	943	60	11	5	
43	Bousquet	Massachusetts	750	200	23	5	
44	Pats Peak	New Hampshire	710	90	23	10	
45	Whaleback	New Hampshire	700	85	30	4	
46	Mohawk Mountain	Connecticut	650	107	25	7	Largest drop in Connecticut.
47	Ski Quechee	Vermont	650	100	13	3	
48	Saskadena Six	Vermont	650	100	23	3	
49	Ski Sundown	Connecticut	625	65	15	5	
50	Powder Ridge	Connecticut	550	80	20	3	
51	Granite Gorge	New Hampshire	525	25	17	2	
52	Cochran's Ski Area	Vermont	500	30	6	5	
53	Arrowhead	New Hampshire	500	5 to 20	9	2	
54	Blandford	Massachusetts	465	158	22	5	
55	Mount Southington	Connecticut	425	51	14	7	
56	Thunder Ridge	New York	403	90	30	7	
57	Otis Ridge	Massachusetts	400	60	11	5	
58	Hermon Mountain	Maine	350	75	18	3	
59	Titcomb Mountain	Maine	350	45	16	2	
60	King Pine	New Hampshire	350	45	17	6	
61	Mount Greylock Ski Club	Massachusetts	350	45	20	2	Vertical data from NewEnglandSkiHistory.com
62	Blue Hills	Massachusetts	309	60	12	4	
63	Woodbury	Connecticut	300	100	15	6	
64	Ski Bradford	Massachusetts	208	48	15	10	
65	Yawgoo Valley	Rhode Island	245	36	12	4	Tallest/only drop in Rhode Island
66	Lost Valley	Maine	240	45	17	2	
67	Nashoba Valley	Massachusetts	240	59	17	11	
68	Ski Ward	Massachusetts	220	45	9	6	
69	Abenaki Ski Area	New Hampshire	200	18	7	2	
70	McIntyre	New Hampshire	147	100	9	2	
