= Pleasant Mountain Ski Area =

Ski area in Bridgton, Maine

- Interactive map of Pleasant Mountain Ski Area
- Location: Bridgton, Maine, US
- Coordinates: 44°3′30″N 70°48′55″W
- Status: Operating
- Owner: Boyne Resorts
- Vertical: 1,300 ft (400 m)
- Trails: 44
- Lift system: 4 chairs: 1 Quad, 3 Triples, 2 Surface Lifts
- Snowmaking: Yes, 99%
- Night skiing: Yes, 23 Trails
- Website: www.pleasantmountain.com

Pleasant Mountain is a ski resort located in Bridgton, Maine, in Cumberland County.

Located on the northern end of Pleasant Mountain, the resort features two base areas and 245 skiable acres. Pleasant Mountain first opened on January 23, 1938 and is the oldest major ski area in Maine. From 1988 until 2022, the area was known as Shawnee Peak.

== History ==
The first trails on Pleasant Mountain were developed by local community groups in 1935. Two years later with assistance from the Works Progress Administration, the town added a rope tow, which opened to the public in January 1938.

In 1960, Pleasant Mountain had five ski runs, one chair-lift and two t-bar lifts, lift fees were US$4, and the ski season was from approximately December 15 to April 10.

In 1988, the ski area was acquired by the owners of Shawnee Mountain Ski Area in Pennsylvania. Pleasant Mountain was subsequently renamed Shawnee Peak to mirror the name of its sister property. After Shawnee Mountain Corporation sold the resort in the early 1990s, new owners considered restoring the original name but ultimately decided against it.

On October 21, 2021, Shawnee Peak was purchased by Boyne Resorts, with the purchase finalized on October 22. Shawnee Peak joins Sugarloaf, Sunday River, and Loon Mountain as Boyne's fourth resort in New England, and third property in Maine. Boyne restored the resort's original name, Pleasant Mountain, on September 14, 2022.

== Terrain and lifts ==
Serving mainly intermediate and Advanced trails, Pleasant Mountain is split up into 3 distinct areas. Those areas (from left to right) are the Sunnyside Area, the front face, and the Pine beginner area. Most of trails on the mountain can be accessed by taking the Summit Triple. The trails Sunset Boulavard, Haggetts, Jack Spratt, and Pine Slope all start from the top of the Summit Triple and bring you over to the beginners area, while Appalachian, Roosevelt, Yee Haw, and Upper Kanc trails can bring you over to the Sunnyside area.

In March of 2024, Pleasant Mountain announced that the Summit Express triple would be replaced with a used high-speed detachable quad, which came from Sunday River, another Boyne Resort. The new lift called "The Summit Express", will have a vertical rise of 1,200 vertical feet and an uphill capacity of 2,400 riders per hour.

Pleasant Mountain has 4 chairlifts, and 2 magic carpets.

Name	Type	Builder	Built	Notes
Summit Express	High Speed Quad	Doppelmayr USA	2024	Relocated from Sunday River, formerly the Jordan Bowl Express.
Sunnyside	Triple	CTEC / Hall	1972	Retrofitted by CTEC, and expanded from a double to a triple. Used to have a mid-station.
Rabbit Run	Triple	Partek	2014	Expanded from a double in 2014.
Pine	Quad	Garaventa CTEC	1997	Services the beginner area, and terrain parks.

Former lifts:

Name	Type	Builder	Years active	Notes
Summit Express	Triple	CTEC	2010 - 2024	Relocated from Loon, and had a mid-station.
Summit	Triple	Riblet	1985 - 2010	This lift now operates at Camden Snow Bowl in eastern Maine.
Rabbit Run	Double	Partek	1988 - 2014	Replaced with a triple lift, in the same alignment.
Old Blue	Double	Constam / Müller	1955 - 1984	First chairlift at Pleasant Mountain. Had a mid-station.

== Night skiing ==
Pleasant Mountain has 19 trails for all abilities lit for night skiing.

== Photos ==
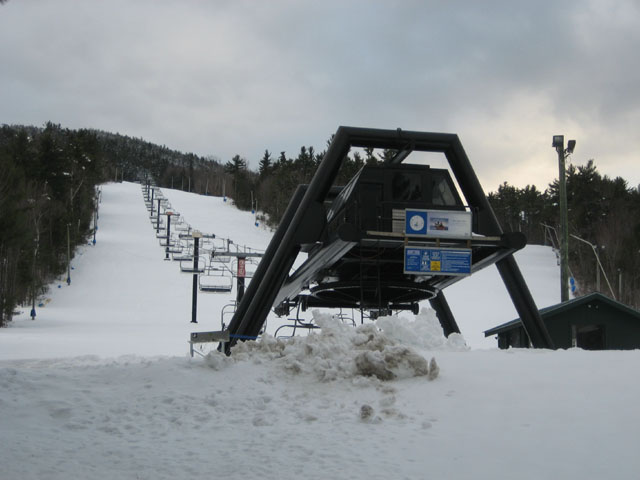
The Pine Quad at Pleasant Mountain, then known as Shawnee Peak.

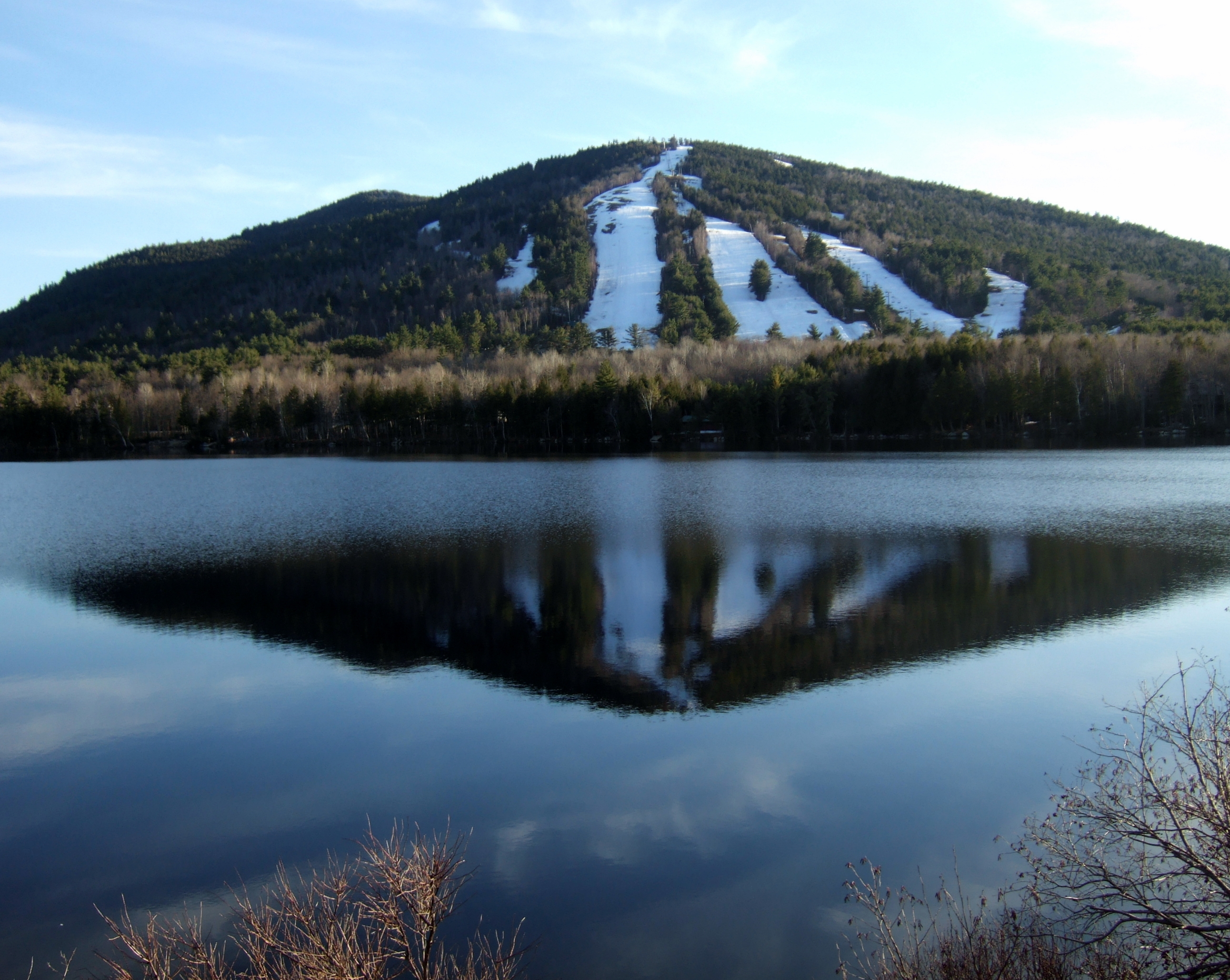
Seen across Moose Pond, Spring 2009.
