= Boyne Resorts =

American resort operator

- Type: Private
- Founded: 1947 (as Boyne Ski Lodge)
- Headquarters: Boyne Falls, Michigan
- Key people: Stephen Kircher, President and CEO
- Number of employees: 10,500+ full time and seasonal (2023)
- Website: www.boyneresorts.com

Boyne Resorts is an owner and operator of ski and golf resorts in North America. The company employs over 10,000 full-time and seasonal staff. It operates 12 resort properties including 10 ski resorts, an adventure park, and 12 golf courses. The company, based in Boyne Falls, Michigan, owns and operates properties in the U.S. states of Michigan, Montana, Washington, Maine, New Hampshire, Tennessee, and Utah, and the Canadian province of British Columbia.

== History ==
Boyne Resorts was founded by Everett Kircher, Jim Christianson and John Norton in 1947. They purchased a steep hill in Northern Michigan for $1 from former State Senator Pierson. Then the co-founders bought a single chairlift from Sun Valley in Idaho and installed it at their Northern Michigan resort as its first lift. This chairlift was the first ever built and is still in service today, it has been upgraded several times. In 1954, Boyne built and opened Gatlinburg SkyLift in Tennessee, a scenic chairlift that operated as a year-round tourist attraction. In 1963, Boyne Highlands in Northern Michigan was added and by 1967, Boyne Mountain expanded to include additional lifts and a golf course. Robert Trent Jones designed the first resort course in the region at Boyne Highlands in 1966.

After Boyne passed opportunities to acquire Telluride Ski Resort in Colorado and Jackson Hole Mountain Resort in Wyoming, they closed a deal to purchase Chet Huntley's Big Sky Resort in 1976, only a few years after its opening in December 1973, and now is the second-largest ski resort in the United States by acreage. In 1986, Boyne purchased Brighton outside of Salt Lake City, Utah. In the 1990s, Boyne purchased golf courses in Michigan and Florida. 1997 brought along the company's fifth ski resort, Crystal Mountain, Washington.

In 2001, Boyne added its first Canadian resort, Cypress Mountain outside Vancouver, British Columbia. Cypress Mountain was the host to all the Freestyle and Snowboard events for the 2010 Winter Olympic Games. In 2002, the company's founder and visionary, Everett Kircher died; his children maintained Boyne as a privately held company (Kircher had transferred ownership of the company to his children in 1976). Son, John Kircher oversaw the Brighton, Cypress Mountain, and Crystal Mountain operations. Son, Stephen Kircher was overseeing the Midwest operations as well as operations at Big Sky Resort. Daughter, Amy Kircher Wright served as the Chairperson of the board. In 2007, Boyne Resorts entered into a sale and leaseback arrangement with CNL Income Properties on the Gatlinburg SkiLift, Brighton and Cypress Mountain. The leases run for at least 40 years to Boyne for operations and all have buy back provisions. Later in 2007, Boyne purchased Sunday River and Sugarloaf in Maine from The American Skiing Company and entered into a sale and leaseback arrangement with CNL Income Properties with similar 40-year leases.

On September 19, 2007, Boyne announced their purchase of CNL Income Properties leases for The Summit at Snoqualmie, Washington, and Loon Mountain, New Hampshire, from Booth Creek Resorts. This purchase made Boyne the largest family owned ski resort operator in North America in terms of number of resorts, and second in number of skier visits at almost 3.6 million visitors.

Boyne Resorts also holds or held numerous patents on snowmaking technologies and has unveiled its latest technology in the Boyne Low E Fan Gun throughout its eastern resorts.

In 2016, CNL Income Properties sold all six of the ski resorts they leased to Boyne to Och-Ziff Capital Management. On March 31, 2017, John Kircher, son of co-founder, acquired Crystal Mountain by trading it with his shares in the company. In March 2018, Boyne Resorts purchased Sunday River, Sugarloaf, The Summit at Snoqualmie, Loon Mountain, Brighton, Cypress Mountain Ski Area, and Gatlinburg SkyLift from Och-Ziff Capital Management after years of leasing the properties. Crystal Mountain was sold to Alterra Mountain Company in 2018.

== Properties ==
=== Ski Resorts ===
- Boyne currently owns and operates ten ski resorts in six U.S. states and one Canadian province.

Name	Location	Number of lifts	Date opened	Date acquired	Notes
Boyne Mountain	Boyne Falls, Michigan	10	1947	1948	
The Highlands	Harbor Springs, Michigan	8	December 26, 1963	1963	
Big Sky Resort	Madison County, Montana	36	December 1973	March 4, 1974	
Brighton	Brighton, Utah	6	1936	1986	
Cypress Mountain	Cypress Provincial Park, British Columbia	6	1970	2001	
The Summit at Snoqualmie	Snoqualmie Pass, Washington	19	1967	October 5, 2007	Acquired from Booth Creek Ski Holdings in 2007.
Loon Mountain	Lincoln, New Hampshire	13	December 1966	October 5, 2007	Acquired from Booth Creek Ski Holdings in 2007.
Pleasant Mountain	Bridgton, Maine	5	January 23, 1938	October 21, 2021	
Sugarloaf	Carrabassett Valley, Maine	12	1953	August 8, 2007	Acquired from ASC in 2007.
Sunday River	Newry, Maine	19	December 19, 1959	August 8, 2007	Acquired from ASC in 2007.

=== Other Properties ===
Name	Location	Notes
Inn at Bay Harbor	Petoskey, Michigan	
Avalanche Bay Indoor Waterpark	Michigan	
Gatlinburg SkyPark	Tennessee	Damaged by fire in 2016, opened Gatlinburg SkyBridge in 2019

== Retail stores ==
Boyne Resorts owns Boyne Country Sports, a sporting goods store chain with seven locations across Michigan.
