= Sugarloaf (ski resort) =

Ski resort in Maine, USA

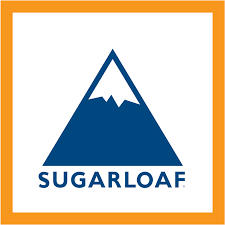
- Sugarloaf Logo
- Interactive map of Sugarloaf
- Location: Carrabassett Valley, Franklin County, Maine; United States
- Nearest city: Farmington
- Coordinates: 45°01′53″N 70°18′47″W
- Status: Operating
- Owner: Boyne Resorts
- Vertical: 2,820 feet (860 m)
- Top elevation: 4,237 feet (1,291 m)
- Base elevation: 1,417 feet (432 m)
- Skiable area: 1,360 acres (550 ha)
- Trails: 176
- Longest run: 3.5 miles (5.6 km)
- Lift system: 15
- Lift capacity: 25,388 skiers per hour
- Terrain parks: 3 (+ Superpipe)
- Snowfall: 200 inches (510 cm) (10 year average)
- Snowmaking: Yes, 95%
- Night skiing: No
- Website: Sugarloaf.com

Sugarloaf (formerly Sugarloaf/USA) is a ski area and resort located on Sugarloaf Mountain in Carrabassett Valley, western Maine. It is the second largest ski resort east of the Mississippi in terms of skiable area (1,360 acres or 550 hectares after Killington's 1,509 acres or 611 ha) and snowmaking percentage (95%); its continuous vertical drop of 2,820 feet (860 m) is the second longest in New England (after Killington's 3,050 feet (930 m)). Sugarloaf recorded a total of 352,000 skier visits in the 2005–2006 season, ranking it second among Maine resorts and 11th in New England.

At 4,237 feet (1291 m) Sugarloaf Mountain is third in elevation to Maine's highest peak, Mount Katahdin. It is second to Hamlin Peak, an adjacent spur of Mt Katahdin. It has the highest peak elevation of any ski resort in New England (just 8 feet above Killington's 4,229 foot summit) and offers the only lift-serviced above-treeline skiing in the Northeast. The Appalachian Trail crosses within 0.6 miles (0.97 km) of Sugarloaf's peak and the summit offers 360-degree views of Maine's western mountains and New Hampshire's White Mountains.

In 1960, Sugarloaf had five ski runs, three t-bar lifts, lift fees were US$4 per day (or $24.50/week), and the ski season was from approximately December 1 to April 30.

As of January 2025, there were over 65 miles (105 km) of marked trails and a total of 651 acres (263 ha) of developed trails. There were 1,400 acres (570 ha) of skiable area boundary to boundary. The fifteen chairlifts have the capacity to carry 25,388 skiers per hour. There are also 174 marked trails and glades, most of which are named after logging terms in a tribute to Maine's logging history. Trails include forty rated as green circle (23%), fifty-four blue square (31%), forty-four black diamond (25%), and thirty-six rated double black diamond (21%). There are also thirty named glades, six terrain parks, and a boarder-cross course. Lifts include three high-speed quads, three fixed-grip quads, one triple, five doubles, two T-bars, and one carpet surface lift. The Sugarloaf season runs from mid-November through early May.

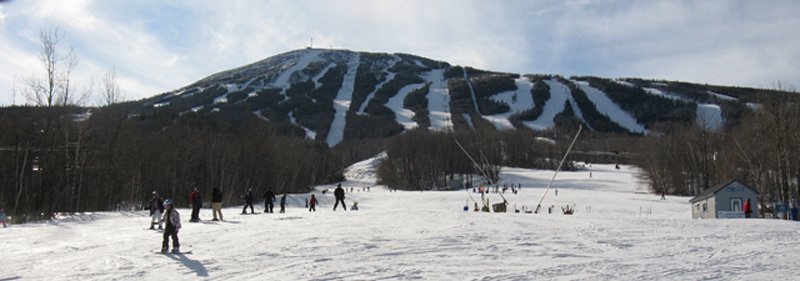

== History ==
=== The beginnings: 1950–1960 ===
The first trail was cut at Sugarloaf in 1950 by the Sugarloaf Mountain Ski Club and a group of locals known as "The Bigelow Boys". Led by Amos Winter, along with Stub Taylor, they transformed the mountain into what is today one of the largest ski areas in the Northeast. The founding of the mountain was called for by the US ski association. They hired Pheous Sprague to find a mountain in Maine. Initially, they planned to have the mountain on the Bigelow mountain range, but when Flagstaff Lake was made the plans had to be scrapped. Phin Sprague then found Amos and Stub who knew of a mountain called Sugarloaf. Many documents relating to the founding and early years now reside at the Ski Museum of Maine in Kingfield, Maine.

In the summer of 1950 Sugarloaf Mountain Ski Club was formed and club member Amos Winter and many volunteers helped cut the first trail up Sugarloaf Mountain, appropriately named Winter's Way. It wound down the Mountain with a 1,800 vertical foot drop and was cut in many places across the hill. Amos noted later that this trail was flawed in its design. In 1952, the first of many ski races was held on Winter's Way.

In 1953 a 700 ft (210 m) rope tow was installed up the lower part of Winter's Way, which was a gentle slope and could be used by beginners and intermediates, while it helped take a few steps out of the hike for experts.

In the summer of 1955 the ski club issued stock and formed the Sugarloaf Mountain Corporation and the first T-Bar was installed. It ascended some 900 vertical feet from the base (a warming hut) and was capable of carrying some 600 skiers per hour. The Narrow Gauge trail was cut to skiers' left and Sluice to skiers' right.

A year later in the summer of 1956 another Constam T-Bar was purchased and installed. This T-Bar ran from the top of the first T-bar up into the snowfields another 2,600 ft (790 m) away (This T-bar is in the same place as the current #3 T-bar is today, and the first T-bar was in the place of current "Long Side" or Double Runner West).

In the summer of 1959 the base area was relocated some 250 feet (76 m) down the hill. A two-story lodge was built and another T-bar added to service the beginner area.

=== Sugarloaf/USA: 1960–1971 ===
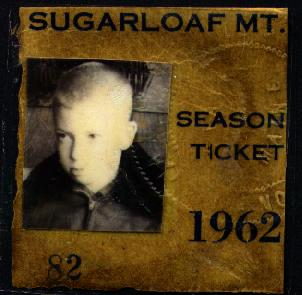
1962 season pass

During the summer of 1961 the #4 and #5 T-bars were installed on the east side of the mountain. They opened up the area that is now called Whiffletree and King Pine Bowl. As of late 1961 electricity only went as far south as Sugarloaf (from the south through Rangeley via Rangeley Power Company Lines west to Eustis, and then south into Carrabassett Valley). The efforts of Leo Tague, a motel owner, brought power to the valley in the beginning of that winter.

During the summer of 1964 it was decided to install a lift made by Polig-Heckel-Bleichert. In the summer of 1965, Sugarloaf installed "The Mighty Gondola", a four-passenger PHB, 8,430 ft (2,570 m) aerial lift, rising convert 2350 vertical feet to the top of Sugarloaf Mountain.

In the summer of 1969 the first chairlift was installed to the west of Tote Road. The chairlift, Bucksaw (which was taken down in 2015 and replaced with a high-speed quad chair in 2024), carried 945 passengers per hour up 1,200 vertical feet and over a mile. It opened up new intermediate terrain referred to now as West Mountain.

The second chairlift was installed in 1970 when Sugarloaf Mountain Corporation (SMC) bought the Sugarloaf Inn. This lift, Sawduster, was installed to carry passengers from the Inn to the Base Lodge.

The Tall Timber Classic is an alpine race course held on Sugarloaf's Narrow Gauge Trail. It has hosted the World Cup (1971) and three U.S. Nationals (1996) (2006) (2008) events, along with many other Downhills and Super-G's. Statistics for the Tall timber classic include a men's downhill vertical drop of 2,430 feet (740 m) and length of 8,220 feet (2,510 m); a women's downhill vertical drop of 1,957 feet (596 m) and length of 6,850 feet (2,090 m); a men's giant slalom vertical drop of 1,347 feet (411 m) and length of 4,830 feet (1,470 m); and a women's giant slalom vertical drop of 1,347 feet (411 m) and length of 4,830 feet (1,470 m).

=== Growth and expansion: the 1970s ===
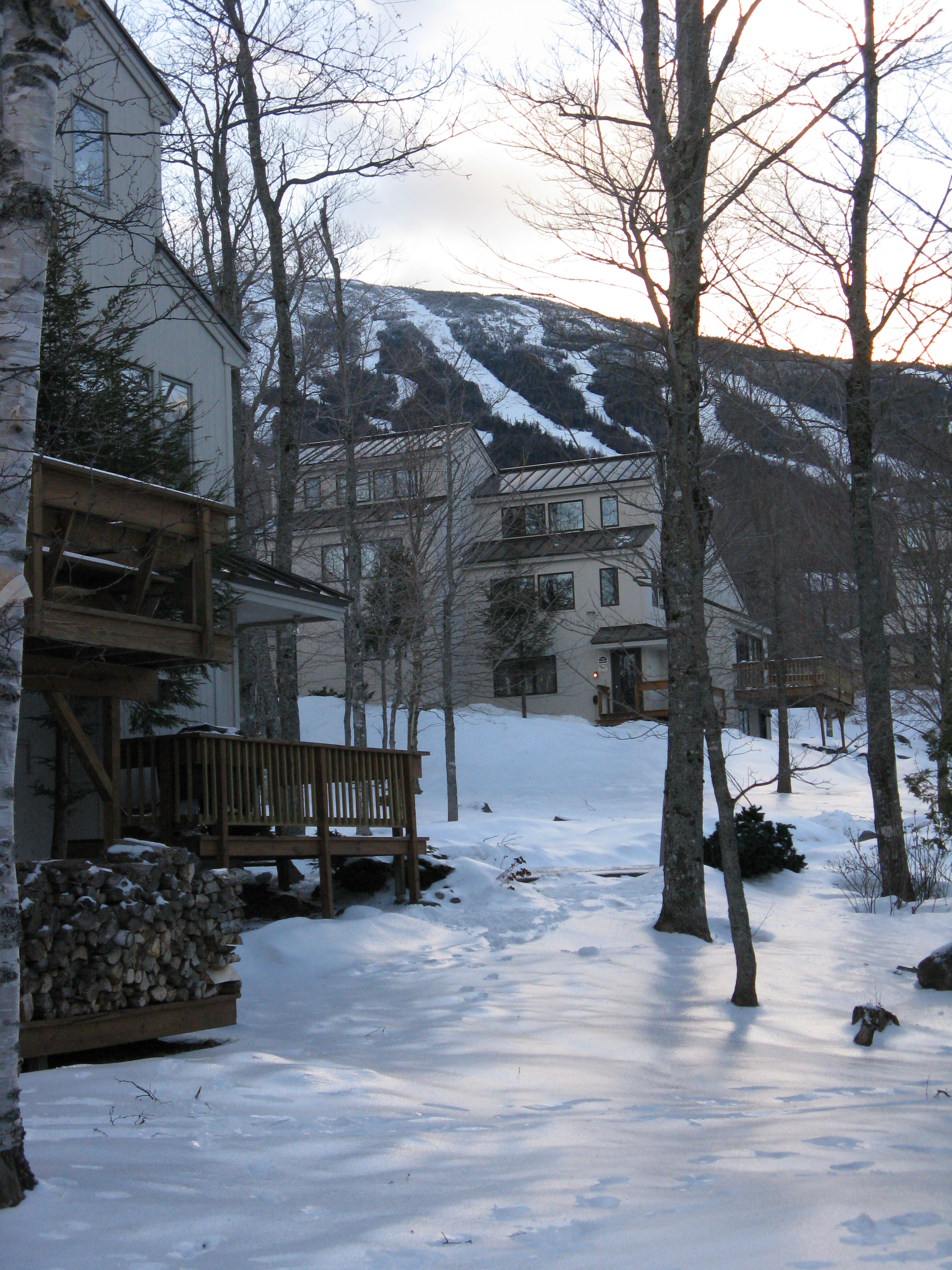
Condominiums built during the 70s

During the early 1970s there was a lack of snowfall throughout the Northeast. This event and the 1967 Oil Embargo a few years earlier would set Sugarloaf on a path towards bankruptcy a decade later. This lack of snowfall did have some positive effects however - snowmaking was installed. In 1973 Sugarloaf was unable to make any snow for December. Saddleback, located in nearby Rangeley, Maine did, however, have snowmaking (it was limited to the Wheeler Slope).

On October 26, 1971, the residents of then Jerusalem Township voted 21–13 to incorporate and create the town of Carrabassett Valley, Maine. The first town meeting was held the next year on April 26, 1972. Crocker and Wyman Townships declined to join Jerusalem township at first, but Crocker township joined the next year. The town would play a huge role in the development of Sugarloaf/USA and the nearby Sugarloaf Outdoors Center.

Valley Crossing was built near the airport, where the fire station, town hall, and many other local government and private buildings are located. The Valley Crossing Complex included ski shops, restaurants, condos, and commercial shops. Due to its location, however, the entire complex was moved up to the base of Sugarloaf.

In the summer of 1972 WTOS-FM "The Mountain of Pure Rock" radio station out of Skowhegan, Maine began transmitting from a radio tower perched on the top of Sugarloaf Mountain.

In the summer of 1973 two more lifts were installed, Double Runner East and West. They replaced the #2 T-Bar and were extended down further to be closer to the base lodge. They were both Borvig Double Chairs. They both had an uphill capacity of about 1,200 passenger per hour, and the two lifts are 4,000 ft (1,200 m) and 3,100 ft (940 m). These lifts are both still in use today.

Because of the lack of snow for the 1973–74 season, SMC decided to install snowmaking. The first trail to have snowmaking installed was Narrow Gauge, where it was installed top to bottom.

That same summer the Spillway Chairs were installed. Spillway East, rated one of New England's best double chairs, stretched about 4,020 feet (1,230 m) long with a vertical rise of 1,500 ft (460 m), and could carry about 1,200 passengers per hour. Those lifts were replaced in 2011 by the Skyline quad, after a derailment accident on Spillway East. The #3 T-Bar is still in operation today and operates on busy days and when the wind is too strong to allow for the Spillway Chairs to run.

With all the new real estate development and an increase in skier days, the power supply was becoming a problem. This changed however in 1975 when Rangeley Power Company was purchased by Central Maine Power (CMP). CMP built a new transmission line from the Wyman Hydro Dam in Moscow, Maine. Additionally, Carrabassett Valley annexed Sugarloaf Township (formerly Crocker Township).

=== Mountainside Corporation and the Appalachian Trail ===
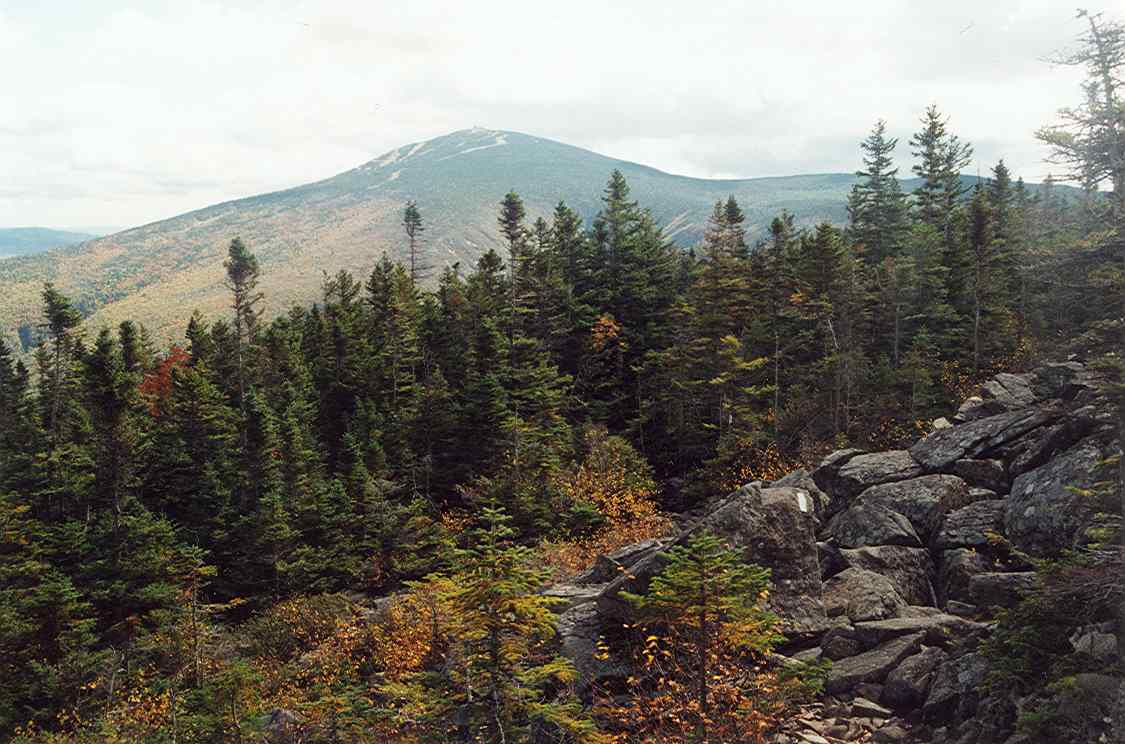
A view from the rerouted A.T.

Several important developments occurred in the late 1970s. On June 25, 1976, Mountainside Corporation was created to take charge of developing and marketing real estate development on Sugarloaf. Mountainside sold the Sugarloaf Inn to Peter Weber. Mountainside is responsible for the condos built along Buckboard off Whiffletree, and many other projects important to Sugarloaf's growth.

During this summer, the Appalachian Trail was moved from the summit of Sugarloaf, to over the summit of Crocker Mountain. In 1978 a fleet of Pisten Bullies was purchased for grooming; this became necessary because of the lack of natural snow. Larry Warren, appointed president in spring of 1979, negotiated the purchase of 1,170 acres (4.7 km^{2}) of land on the adjoining Burnt Mountain for future lift and trail development. At the end of the 1970s, Sugarloaf/USA had an uphill capacity of more than 9,000 skiers per hour.

=== The 1980s and 90s ===
With the help of Peter Weber, a golf course, designed by Robert Trent Jones Jr, was constructed at the resort. At the same time, the Carrabassett Valley Academy was also founded. The cost of building new real estate and overruns, along with the lack of natural snow and snowmaking, put SMC in debt.

In the year 2000, Sugarloaf/USA officially celebrated its 50th anniversary. The celebrations included a new color scheme which included orange, introduced for the year. In just fifty years Sugarloaf had moved from a mountain with just one trail, to one with over one-hundred-and-thirty trails, fourteen lifts, and had hosted World Cups, U.S. Nationals, and many other ski and snowboard events (Pictured is the Sugarloaf Logo with the orange scheme).

=== New ownership: 2007–present ===
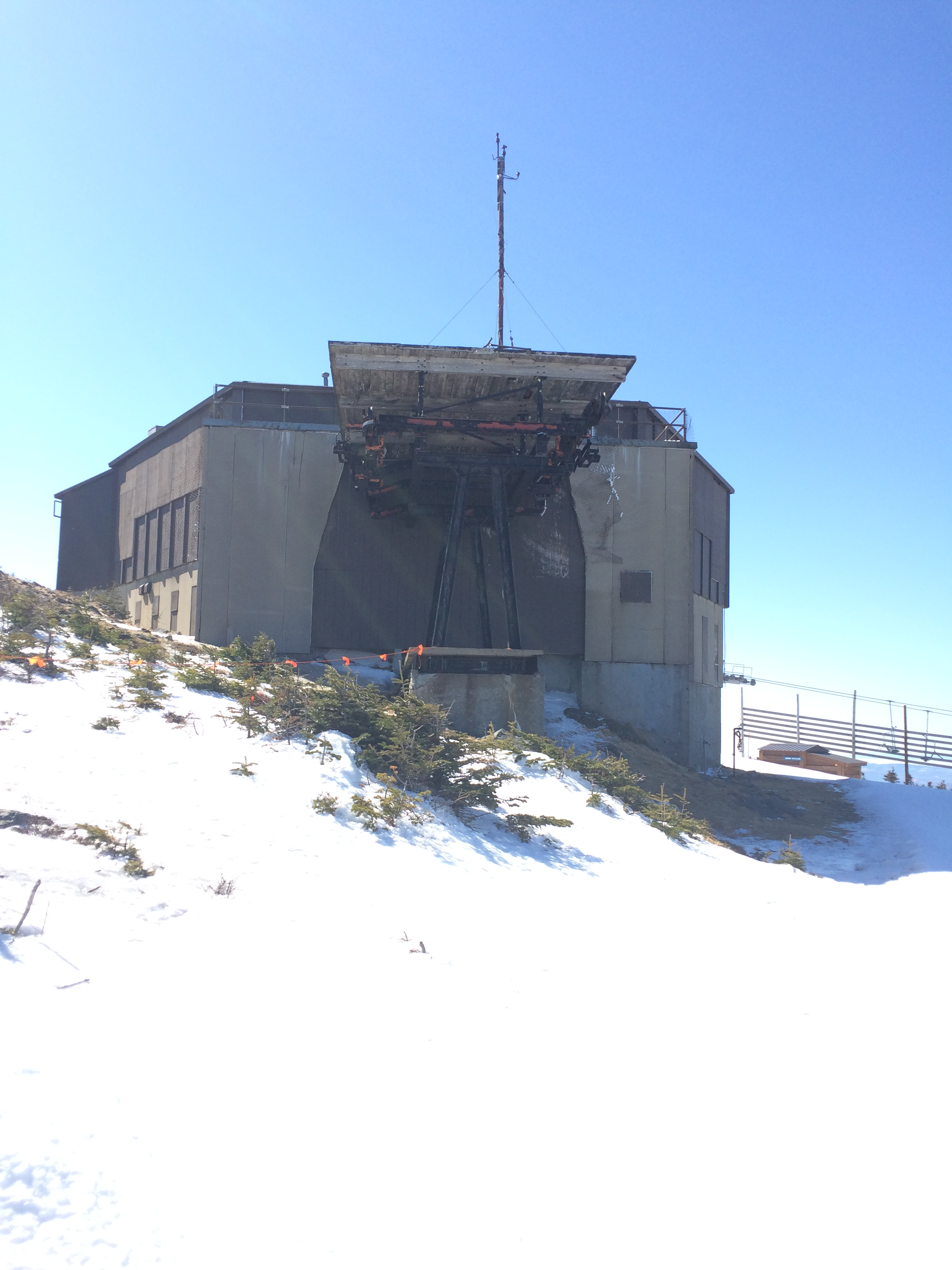
Abandoned gondola building, March 2016

In August 2007 Sugarloaf was sold by American Skiing Company to CNL Lifestyle Properties, to be managed by Boyne Resorts. CNL/Boyne also purchased Sunday River, another Maine ski area owned by ASC.

Under new management, the resort promptly began performing overdue maintenance and upkeep that had begun to be neglected during lean ASC years. This included dismantling the old Gondola mid-station building, re-painting and maintaining lifts, towers, and buildings that were showing signs of neglect, and making significant upgrades to the resort's snowmaking system. Boyne Resorts also removed the "USA" from "Sugarloaf/USA." Boyne also installed the Moosecalator, a Magic Carpet, on The Birches Slope.

During the Summer of 2008, Sugarloaf saw more than $5 million in offseason upgrades, including all new pumps for the snowmaking system, 25 new Boyne Low-E fan guns, and 50 low energy HKD tower guns. The resort also installed all new trail signage, replaced old, run-down lift shacks with new lift building, and completely redesigned its Terrain Parks, including a new snowboardcross course designed by Olympian Seth Wescott. The resort also saw a significant expansion to its on-mountain restaurant, Bullwinkle's.

In the fall of 2009, Sugarloaf and Boyne, with the help of Olympic gold medalist Seth Wescott are trying to team up with the town to help purchase a new "signature lift". Seth Wescott presented a proposal during a town meeting to see if the town would help finance for a new $10 million gondola that would run the same path as the original gondola. This led to the announcement of the resort's ten-year plan, which was revealed in September 2010, going by the name Sugarloaf 2020. This plan announced expansion of sidecountry glade terrain into Brackett Basin and Burnt Mountain, areas controlled by the resort for years that were only rumored for expansion. Sugarloaf 2020 also announced many new upgrades to the mountain's snowmaking and lift systems. Lifts listed for potential upgrade included the Spillway, Double Runner, Timberline, and West Mountain chairlifts. As for new lifts, the "signature lift" was listed as well as a T-Bar that would run from the top of the #3 T-Bar to the summit.

Brackett Basin would open immediately for Winter 2010–2011. A crew of 12 men worked clearing 60 acres of terrain from the top of the King Pine chair directly to the east of the existing Cant Dog Glade, introducing Cant Dog 2, Birler, Edger, and Sweeper Glade. Glades were woven together and emptied out at the bottom of the King Pine chair. Low angle terrain sat beneath the King Pine chair and was cleared down to the bottom of Lower Stub's, offering run outs via the Sugarloaf Nordic Center to the Snubber chair or by crossing Mountainside Road through local condominium complexes to the Whiffletree chair. Logging companies were given the opportunity to log the lower terrain. The glades opened in Winter 2010 down low included Rough Cut, Red Horse, High Ball, and Blacksmith Glade, as well as the Logging Road. The Brackett Basin project was completed in co-ordination with the Maine Department of Environmental Protection so as to protect environments home to endangered species such as the Bicknell's Thrush. On January 19, 2011, the terrain accessible via the King Pine chair opened for the first time.

As a result of the derailment of the Spillway East chair, it was announced that in the summer of 2011 a new fixed-grip quad chairlift would replace the aged Spillway lift. That work was completed and the Skyline lift, a $3 million Doppelmayr carpet-loading fixed-grip quad chair, opened during the 2011–12 season. The construction process started on April 19 with chair removal on Spillway West. Spillway East continued to run until May 1. Demolition of the old Spillway chair was complete by the end of June. Construction of the new Skyline chair was completed by November 17 when the load test was conducted. Also for the 2011 ski season cutting began on phase two of the Burnt Mountain Expansion and the Drive system in the SuperQuad was upgraded from analog to digital. On Burnt Mountain, the existing Brackett Basin section saw additional trimming and cutting while the glade traverse was added this year into Phase 2. This traverse, called the Golden Road, started a hiking trail over the ridge between Sugarloaf and Burnt Mountain, offering higher entrances to Birler, Edger, and Sweeper, as well as the furthest down entrance into the Eastern Territory, a logged area mixed with glades and skidder roads on the western and northern facing, low-lying slopes of Burnt Mountain. The Eastern Territory did not open in 2011–12 as more clearing needed to be done in the summer of 2012.

In addition to clearing the Eastern Territory in 2012, the entrance to Brackett Basin was improved to minimize skier backups and exposure of rocks and brush through the snow. The main additions of the offseason included the purchase of 300 low-energy HKD snowguns, remodeling the ski shop and renaming it the Downhill Supply Company, as well as implementing a $1.4 million irrigation system on the golf course. In 2013, 200 more low-energy HKD snowguns were purchased and a new snowmaking line was put in on Gondola Line. In terms of guest experience, the lodge saw improvements to the Mountain Magic area for beginner skiers, a newer and larger hot tub was put in at the Sugarloaf Mountain Hotel and the renovation of the new restaurant 45 North was completed. Additionally, the Upper West Mountain trail was widened in sections for ski team usage. Off to the skier's left of West Mountain, Greenhorn Glade was cut as a sidecountry experience, starting as a glade opening up into logged terrain as the pitch levels out, the run dumps out above the West Mountain developments. On Burnt Mountain, Phase 3 was started with the first glade cut off the summit, Androscoggin Glade, only accessible via the Burnt Mountain hiking trail at the end of the Golden Road, dumping into the Eastern Territory as a run out. It covers 68 acres and 1200 vertical feet. A new glade was cut on the main mountain as well off the skier's right on Upper Gondola Line called Gondi Glade. Finally, land was acquired off the backside of the mountain that locals had been skiing for years. These runs known as Awesome, Adrenaline Rush, Hell's Gate, and Ball and Chain offered extreme skiing with cliff drops from the backside runout to the Brackett Basin traverse in the King Pine area.

In 2014, snowmaking improvements were conducted on Slasher, to improve connection points on the eastern part of the mountain, and 40 new low-energy HKD snowguns were purchased. A new winch cat was purchased and a new tuning machine was bought to modernize operations in the ski shop. The Sugarloaf Mountain Hotel lobby was upgraded. A new 10-acre glade, Slashfire, was cut in Brackett Basin off the Golden Road to the east of Sweeper, which dumps into the bottom of Sweeper Glade near the "Sweeper Bridge". The 2014-15 ski season was also the first in which the village was completely pedestrian friendly. Vehicular traffic was eliminated, moving the bus drop off in front of the base lodge near the Birches Slope instead of in the village between the lodge and the hotel.

During the 2015–16 season, a new Doppelmayr terminal was installed at the King Pine lift due to a roll back issue that occurred the previous season. In addition, the Bucksaw lift that had long served the West Mountain area was taken off-line and dismantled due to old age. In summer 2016, the competition center was re-built and expanded as a state of the art facility. This process removed the old gondola building which the center called home, effectively removing suspicions that a "signature lift" would be constructed. That summer, a cut off from Androscoggin Glade was cut called Little Androscoggin Glade.

In 2016, CNL sold its ski resorts; Sugarloaf was sold to Och-Ziff Capital Management.

In 2017, cat skiing on Burnt Mountain was announced. Starting from the log yard, the cat will travel up Burnt Mountain on the boundary line near Androscoggin Glade to the top of Burnt Mountain. Kennebec Glade was cut in 2018 to introduce another run off of Burnt Mountain.

In 2019, Sugarloaf added their first beginner's glade area to the map, Alice's Winter Land Glade, opening access to the woods beneath the Skidway chair for the first time. In addition, the Widowmaker Lounge was renovated. Some upgrades included re-locating the bar and the stage, as well as providing better utilization of the upstairs space by adding deck access. The Narrow Gauge snowmaking line was upgraded to a 12-inch line, a new air line was put in at the Timbers, and new Klik hydrants were put in on early season trails, such as Hayburner, King's Landing, and Candy Side. A new bullwheel was placed on Snubber's base terminal and a new haul rope was spliced on the Skidway chair.

Boyne purchased the resort from Och-Ziff Capital Management in March 2018, along with sister resorts Sunday River and Loon, to gain full control of the mountain with the hopes of funding more on-mountain projects. As 2020 approached, many of the announced capital improvements in the 10-year plan, Sugarloaf 2020, were not fulfilled under CNL ownership. With Boyne now holding much of the mountain, and the passage of time, new plans for capital improvements were announced at the 2019 Homecoming Meeting. Among Boyne's goals in coming years is expansion of snow-making with Caribou Pond as a new water source. That project has been approved to start in 2020. Initial construction will focus on re-constructing the dam at Caribou Pond, then in future years providing transportation of water from the pond to the mountain and the golf course for snowmaking and irrigation, respectively. This new system will greatly increasing the mountain's snowmaking capacity. Other proposed improvements include a new Timberline Quad, with the possibility of extension to Bullwinkle's. Additionally, development on West Mountain of a new chair, parking lot, tubing park, Bullwinkle's access road, and short golf course. Finally, a yurt at the top of Whiffletree was proposed to provide on-mountain restrooms on the east side of the mountain.

== Lift system ==
Sugarloaf has 15 lifts.

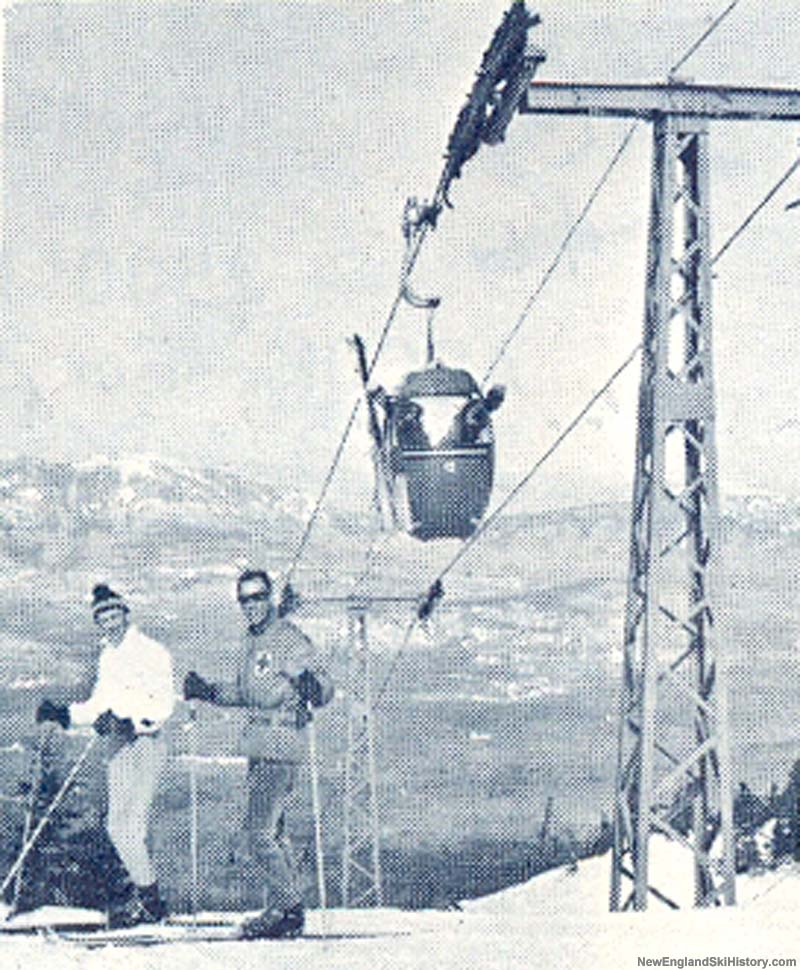
"The Mighty Gondola", pictured sometime in the early 1970s

=== Accidents ===
On February 3, 1987, a counterweight cable on the lower section of the Gondola snapped, resulting in two injuries and subsequent rope evacuation. This resulted in the gondola's closure until 1991, when the lower section was pillaged for parts in order to reopen the upper section. The gondola closed permanently in 1997 and summit access is now provided by the Timberline Quad.

On December 28, 2010, the Spillway East double chair derailed, sending some passengers on a 30-foot (9.1 m) fall. The accident injured 8 people and was blamed on a misaligned cable. At least one lawsuit against Sugarloaf was filed in regards to the incident.

On March 21, 2015, the King Pine quad chair experienced a rollback (the chair started to go backwards down the hill), seriously injuring seven skiers when a chairlift malfunctioned. Four were taken to the hospital.
