= The Summit at Snoqualmie =

Resort in Washington, United States

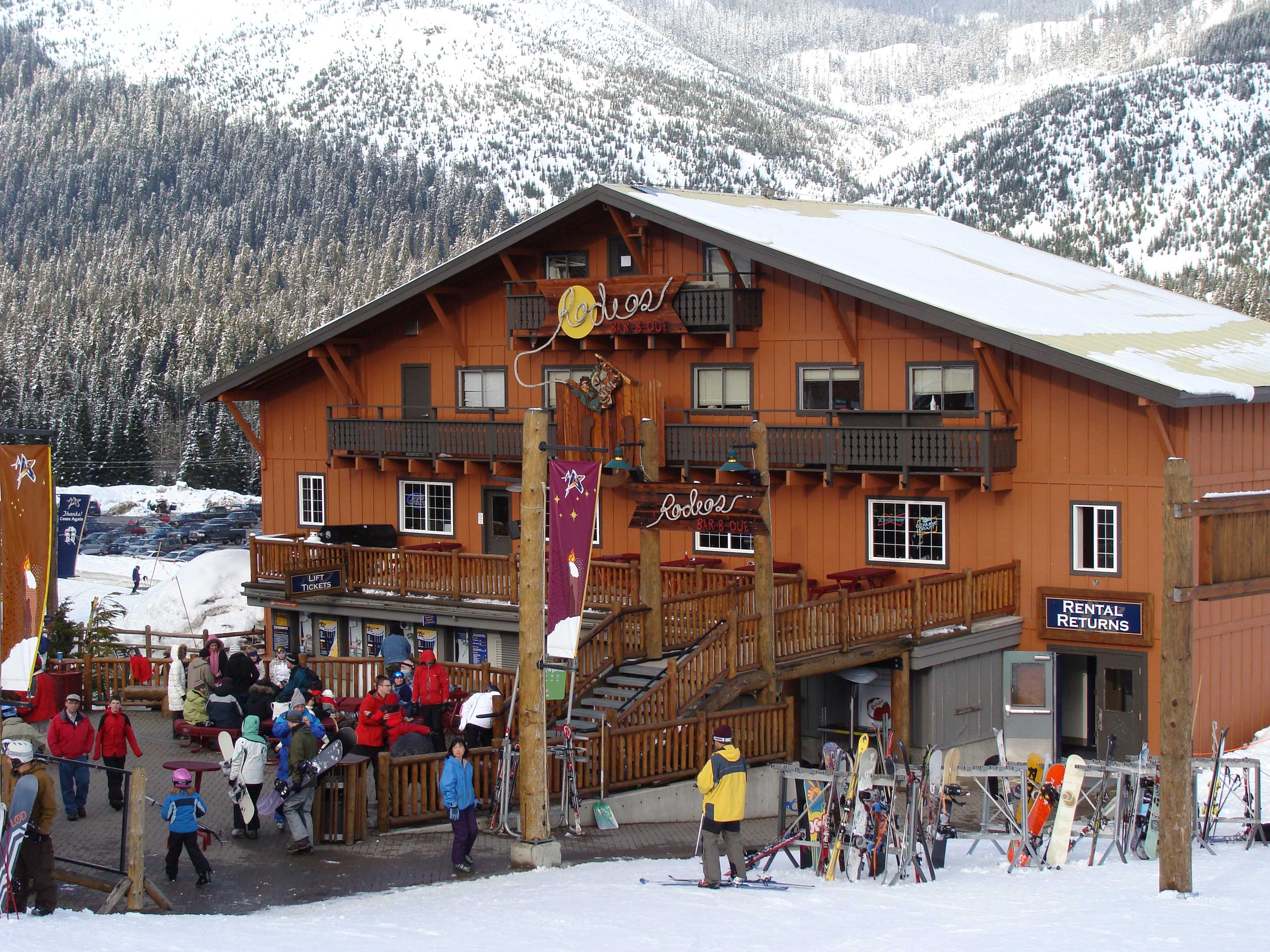

- Location in Washington Location in the United States
- Location: Snoqualmie Pass, Washington, U.S.
- Nearest city: North Bend – 18 miles (29 km)
- Coordinates: 47.424°N 121.416°W
- Status: Operating
- Owner: Boyne Resorts
- Vertical: 2,280 ft (695 m); Alpental – 2,280 ft (695 m); Summit; Central – 1,025 ft (312 m); West – 765 ft (233 m); East – 1,100 ft (335 m)
- Top elevation: 5,420 ft (1,652 m) (Alpental)
- Base elevation: 2,610 ft (796 m) (Summit East)
- Skiable area: 1,914 acres (7.7 km^{2}) (combined)
- Trails: 62 (combined): 14% easiest; 45% more difficult; 41% most difficult
- Longest run: Internationale; 1.2 mi (1.9 km)
- Lift system: 20 chairs, 5 surface lifts Alpental: 5 chairs, 1 surface lift Summit Central: 7 chairs, 1 surface lift Summit West: 5 chairs, 3 surface lifts Summit East: 3 chairs
- Snowfall: 435 inches (36.3 ft; 11.0 m)
- Website: summitatsnoqualmie.com

The Summit at Snoqualmie is a recreation area in the northwest United States, located on Snoqualmie Pass, Washington. It provides alpine skiing and snowboarding, Nordic skiing, mountain biking, winter tubing, and scenic lift rides. Owned and managed by Boyne Resorts, it is 52 miles (80 km) east of downtown Seattle on Interstate 90.

The Summit consists of four base areas that used to be individually owned and operated resorts. Alpental, Summit West (formerly Snoqualmie Summit), Summit Central (formerly Ski Acres), and Summit East (formerly Hyak and PacWest), border Lake Keechelus on the East and the Alpine Lakes Wilderness on the West/North. The Summit at Snoqualmie is the closest ski area to Seattle, about an hour away.

Ski Lifts, Inc., the operator of what became Summit West, acquired the other three resorts. Booth Creek Ski acquired the properties in 1997. Booth Creek sold The Summit to CNL Lifestyle in 2006, but continued to operate the resort under a lease. Booth Creek sold The Summit lease to Boyne Resorts in 2007. CNL Lifestyle sold Booth Creek in a batch of resorts to Och-Ziff Capital Management in 2016. Boyne purchased the ski resort in March 2018.

The vertical drop ranges from 2,280 ft (690 m) at Alpental, to 765 ft (233 m) at Summit West. Combined, the four base areas have 20 chairlifts and 5 surface lifts. The resort is open seven days and six nights per week.

== Alpental ==
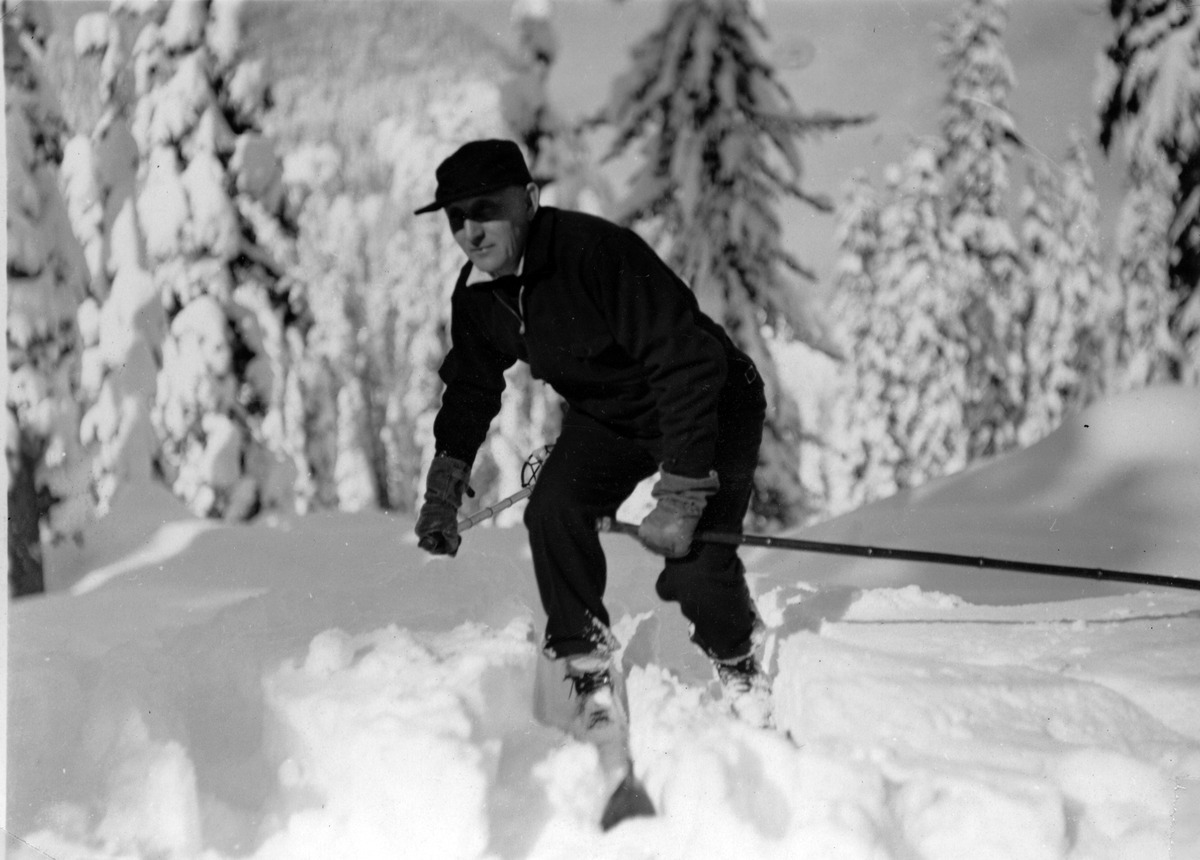
Ben Evans, Director of Playfields of the Seattle Parks Department, skiing at Seattle's Municipal Park at Snoqualmie Summit, 1935.

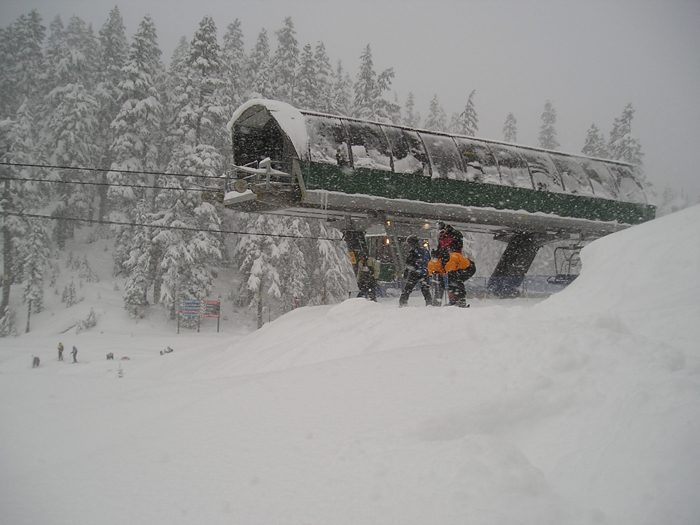
Top of Armstrong Express (also known as Chair 1)

Of the four base areas, only Alpental is located north of I-90 and is known for its advanced and backcountry terrain, including some of the steepest runs in the state. It has 2 double lifts, 2 triple chairlifts, 1 high-speed detachable-quad, and 1 surface lift.

=== History ===
The territory of Alpental ski area was first owned through mining claims by early prospectors of the valley. Bob Mickelson and some friends bought options on the mining claims around 1960 with plans to develop a ski area on Denny Mountain and a community in the lower area. To help out with their plan, they enlisted Warren Miller to produce a promotional video simply titled "Alpental". To gain access to the area, they had to reach agreement with the Sahalie Ski Club to allow a road through their property. Alpental ski area agreed to maintain this section of road at their cost for the Sahalie group in exchange for this access for 99 years.

The ski area opened for the 1967–68 season with 3 chairlifts, then called Eins (1), Zwei (2), Drei (3), and 5 rope tows, had night skiing from the beginning, and was closed on Mondays. In 1970, the beginner lift, St. Bernard, was installed along with a platter pull that can be accessed via the Drei lift. In 1979, the ski area was sold to Westours (an Alaska tour operator), who gave the lifts real names, Meister (Master), Edelweiss, and Sessel (chair), and named the rope tows by German numbers, similar to the chairlifts’ old names. Then, in 1984 Westours sold the resort to Ski Lifts, Inc..

In 1984, Debbie Armstrong, a local skier, won the Winter Olympics, which made the summit rename the Meister lift and the Sessel Piste (Chair Slope) Trail into Debbie's Gold. The Debbie's Gold lift was replaced with a high-speed quad called Armstrong Express in 1998.

In 2023, the Sessel triple was completed and has been open since the 2023-2024 season. The following year, another triple, Internationale, was completed. It opened for the 2024-2025 season in December 2024 and had a mechanical issue shortly after it opened. The two-seat, 1,100-foot (340 m) Edelweiss chair will be replaced by a triple-seat chair and is scheduled to open for the 2025-2026 season.

== Summit West ==
Mainly a beginner/intermediate area, Summit West is home to the Summit Learning Center (SLC), which offers many varieties of lessons for all ages. It has 2 double lifts, 1 triple lift, 2 quad lifts, and 3 surface lifts.

=== History ===
In 1933, the city of Seattle opened a city park called Municipal Park on the location which is now called Summit West. The city operated this area until 1937, when the townspeople decided Snoqualmie Pass was too far away to be run as a city park. Operations were turned over to Ski Lifts, Inc. co-owned by Jim Parker and Chauncey Griggs, who had been the concessionaire since 1937, the year they added rope tows to the park. Under the ownership of Ski Lifts, Inc. the area was renamed Snoqualmie Summit Ski Area because of its location at the top of the mountain pass. In 1942, Griggs and Parker sold Ski Lifts, Inc. to Rance Morris and Webb Moffett for $3,500. In 1955, the first double lift at what is now known as the Summit at Snoqualmie, Thunderbird, was installed. In 1963, 1966, and 1967, 3 new lifts were installed: Big Bill, 360, and Dodge Ridge, respectively. In 1969, the Beaver Lake rope tow was replaced with a double lift. In 1973, the last double chair at Snoqualmie Summit, Julie's Chair, was installed. The first two triple lifts, installed in 1974 and 1975, were Wild Side and Easy Rider. The first quad was installed in 1987, named Little Thunder, replacing three rope tows. Later Snoqualmie Summit was sold to Booth Creek, who renamed it to Summit West, and replaced the aging Big Bill lift with a quad lift called Pacific Crest, and removed the 360 Bowl and Beaver Lake lifts. In 2002, the Thunderbird lift was removed and in 2005, a pole was hauled down to the base. Then the Summit at Snoqualmie was sold to Boyne Mountain, a family owned corporation consisting of nine resorts located in the United States and Canada. In 2018, Boyne removed the Easy Rider chairlift.

Ski Lifts, Inc. acquired Ski Acres in 1980, Alpental in 1983, and Hyak in 1992, agreeing in December 1996 to sell the entire operation to Booth Creek Ski Holdings, Inc.

In 2024, the 50-year-old Wildside triple lift was replaced by a Doppelmayr quad, primarily due to staff shortages and mechanical issues in previous years.

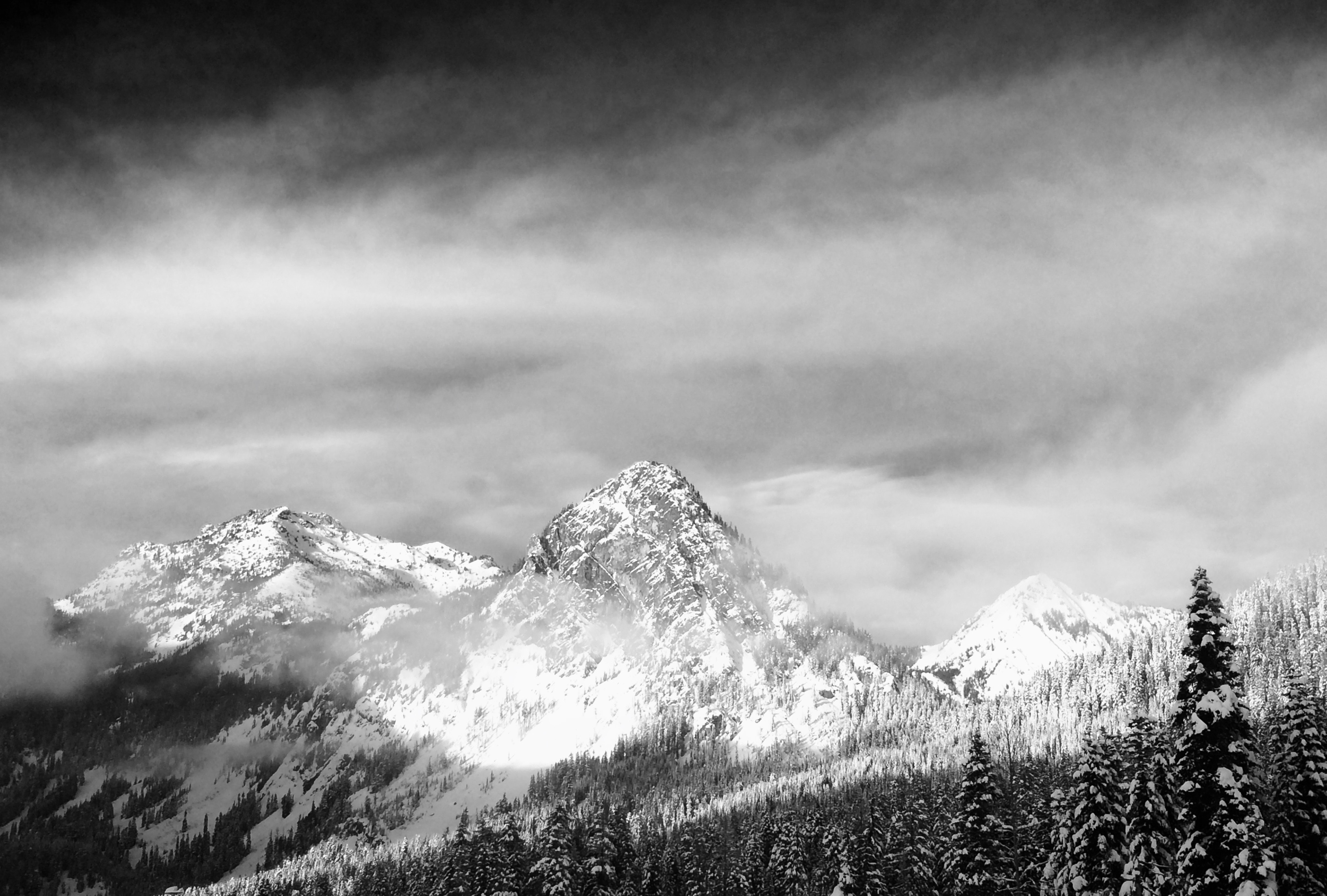
Looking West

== Summit Central ==
Summit Central provides a variety of terrain and is typically the most crowded of the slopes. It is also home to a large terrain park which hosts many events throughout the season. It has 3 double lifts, 1 triple lift, 1 quad lift, 2 high-speed detachable-quads, and 1 surface lift.

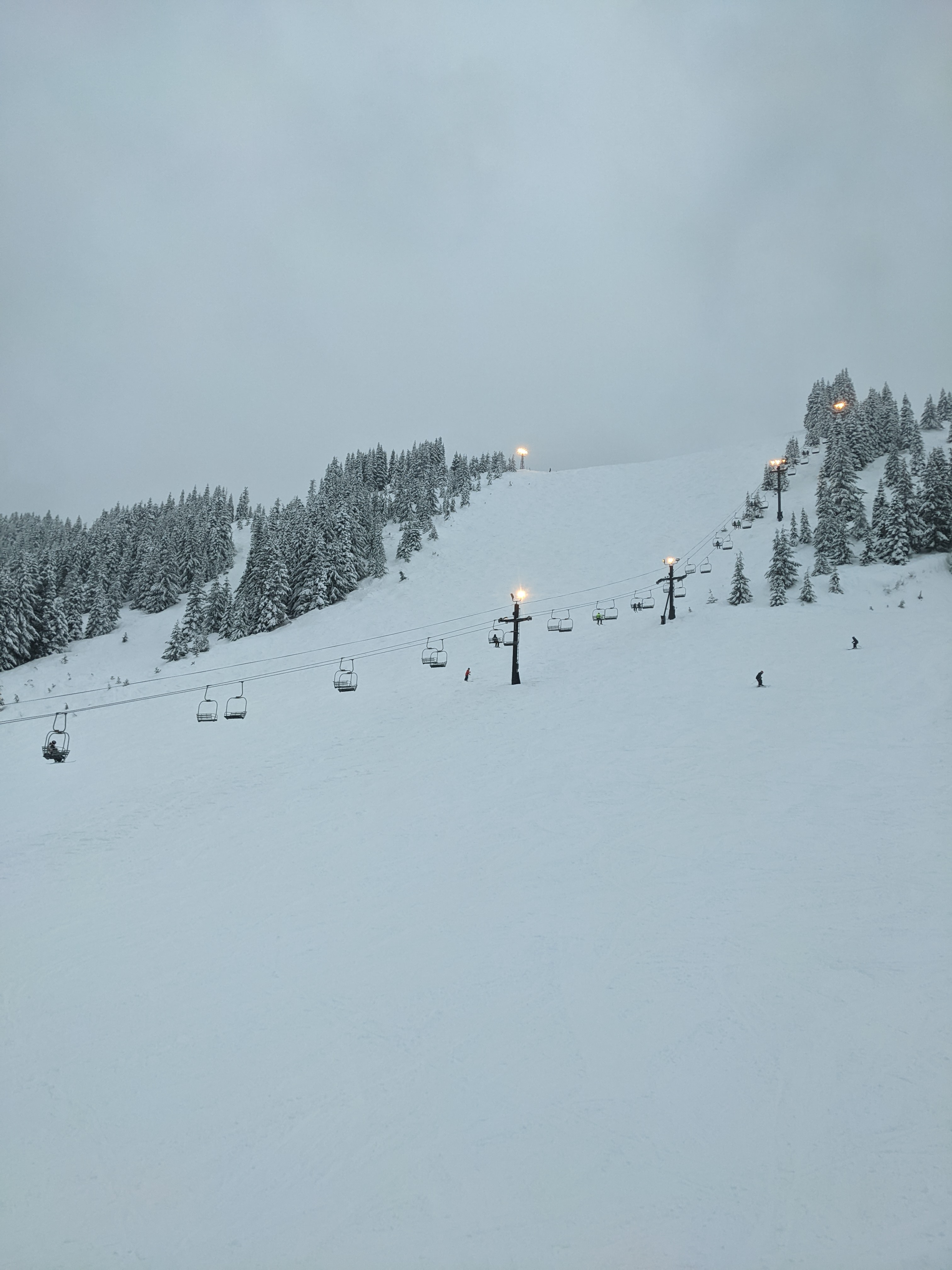
Triple 60 run at Summit Central with the Triple 60 lift running up across and Show-Off run in background.

=== History ===
In 1948, the "Ski Acres" ski area was opened by Ray Tanner. The following year in 1949, the first chairlift in Washington was built. In 1962, a new lift called Alpine was installed by Ray Tanner, servicing the Alpine Bowl, a now popular hill at the resort. In 1966, another lift adjacent to Alpine, called Bonanza, was installed, servicing Golden Nugget, Hog Wild, Outback and Bonanza. In 1967, the Intermediate Chair was installed replacing a Hall T-bar, followed by Condominium (which serviced lower Hog Wild) and then Edelweiss in 1970 and 1972, respectively. In 1975, the Holiday lift was installed running on the north end of Ski Acres. In 1980, Ski Lifts, Inc. acquired Ski Acres and combined the operation with adjacent Snoqualmie Summit. In 1983, the Single Chair, installed in 1949, was replaced with a triple lift called Triple 60, and the Edelweiss chair was renamed Easy Street due to a name conflict with the Edelweiss chair of Alpental, and the Intermediate Chair was renamed Gallery. In 1986, new terrain was added on the south end called Silver Fir, and in 1988, a triple chairlift of the same name was installed in the area. After the purchase by Booth Creek in 1997 Ski Acres was renamed Summit Central and the Condominium and chair was renamed Reggie's. In 1998, a high-speed quad called Central Express replaced the Alpine and Bonanza doubles. In 2008 the Silver Fir triple chair was replaced with a high-speed detachable-quad called Silver Fir Express. In 2019 the Holiday Riblet double chair was replaced with a new Doppelmayr fixed grip quad with a loading carpet. Also in 2019, lighting for Silver Fir Express is installed. In 2023, the upper and lower magic carpets were removed and a single, dual-track magic carpet was installed.

== Summit East ==
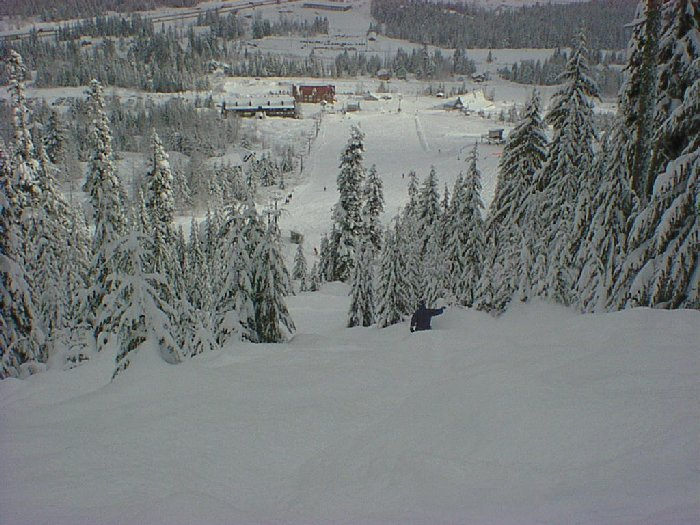
Looking from slopes above the original Easy Gold chair from Roz's Run at the Summit East ski area in MLK day 2002.

Summit East (also known as "Hyak") is the easternmost of the four base areas and is accessible via I-90 exit 54. A mix of intermediate and advanced runs, Summit East is where to go for glade skiing. Adjacent to the alpine ski area, the Hyak area has free cross-country skiing on groomed trails along Lake Keechelus on the Iron Horse Trail (maintained by the Washington State Parks). It has 2 triple lifts and 1 quad lift.

=== History ===
In 1959, a new ski area was developed on the north side of Hyak Mountain by three businessmen who formed the Hyak Ski Corporation. In 1965, the up-and-over Chair 1 was constructed, and then a beginner Chair 2 in 1968, originally planned to go up "New Cut". Then, the company made some bad financial moves. On December 30, 1971, at approximately 3 p.m., Chair 1 went out of control in reverse, leaving an 18-year-old skier with permanent damage. A backup lift, Chair 3, was installed in 1974. A subsequent lawsuit, along with a bad season sent the area into bankruptcy in 1977.

The area was purchased in 1980 by Pac West and expanded terrain to the north in 1986, but they too filed bankruptcy in 1988, when Chair 1 stopped working. Pac West was one of the few ski resorts to allow snowboarding, along with Mt. Baker ski area. Bob Barci helped set up the first snowboard competition in 1985 which was won by Craig Kelly. In 1991 the area was purchased by Ski Lifts, Inc who now owned all 4 local Snoqualmie Pass ski areas. The name was then reverted to Hyak and the 3 chairs were given proper names: Chair 1 was Dinosaur, Chair 2 was Easy Gold, and Chair 3 was Keechelus. In 1998, Booth Creek purchased the areas from Ski Lifts, Inc, and Hyak then became Summit East.

On January 7, 2009, a large landslide destroyed the Keechelus ski lift, one house and damaged 3 others, which ended downhill skiing and snowboarding for the rest of the 2008–2009 season and the entire 2009–2010 season. Alpine operations returned for the 2010–2011 season with the installation of the used Silver Fir triple chair from Summit Central on the front side as well as reopening terrain in Hidden Valley re-using a combination of parts from the old Keechelus and Easy Gold double chairs.

On May 15, 2014, The Summit at Snoqualmie announced that the ski resort will start construction of a new chairlift in the spring. Rampart Chair was opened for the 2015/2016 winter season with construction starting in June 2014. The fixed-grip quad chair featuring an easy-load conveyor system was built and installed by SkyTrac, an American chairlift company based in Salt Lake City, Utah. The Rampart chairlift was a long-awaited addition to Summit East and increased uphill capacity substantially while opening up a sizable portion of glade skiing in the area. The chairlift is located on the northern facing slopes of the Summit East ski area.

The new chair was constructed at Summit East in the summer of 2014 and is a fixed-grip quad. It was proposed to open for the 14-15 ski season, but due to lack of snow and storm damage, it was unable to be used. It opened on New Years Day 2016.

In April 2022, The Summit at Snoqualmie released its Summit 2030 Plan, and announced that a triple lift replacing the Hidden Valley double that summer. Hidden Valley opened on Dec 28, 2022.

== Cross-Country Skiing ==
The Summit at Snoqualmie operates over 50 kilometers of Nordic ski trails. The Nordic center typically operates mid-December to early April. The Nordic center is located at Summit East. Trails feature two warming huts along the trail. The Jim Brooks warming hut is located over Windy Pass (on the west side). There is another hut located at Grand Junction.

In addition to the cross-country ski trails at the Summit at Snoqualmie, there are several miles of cross-country ski trails that are maintained by Washington State Parks and are accessible from the Sno-Park adjacent to the Summit East base area.

== Other activities ==
The Summit Tubing Center, adjacent to Summit Central, has 20 machine-groomed lanes. The runs are approximately five hundred feet long and use magic carpets, which replaced two handle-tow lines.

During the skiing off-season, several parts of the ski area are open for other recreational uses. A summertime mountain bike park opened in 2022 and uses the Silver Fir Express and Central Express lifts. It replaced an earlier mountain biking area that closed in 2002. The Pacific Crest chair lift runs during the summer months to provide scenic views and access to hiking areas. A nine-hole disc golf course opened at Summit West in 2024.

The Summit at Snoqualmie offers shuttle bus service from the Rattlesnake Lake trailhead of the Palouse to Cascades Trail to the Hyak trailhead. It also offers shuttle service from the Summit Bike Park at Silver Fir to the Hyak trailhead. Its main purpose was to make the trail more accessible and convenient to reach, as going eastbound on the trail required going uphill for most of the time.

== Summit 2030 ==
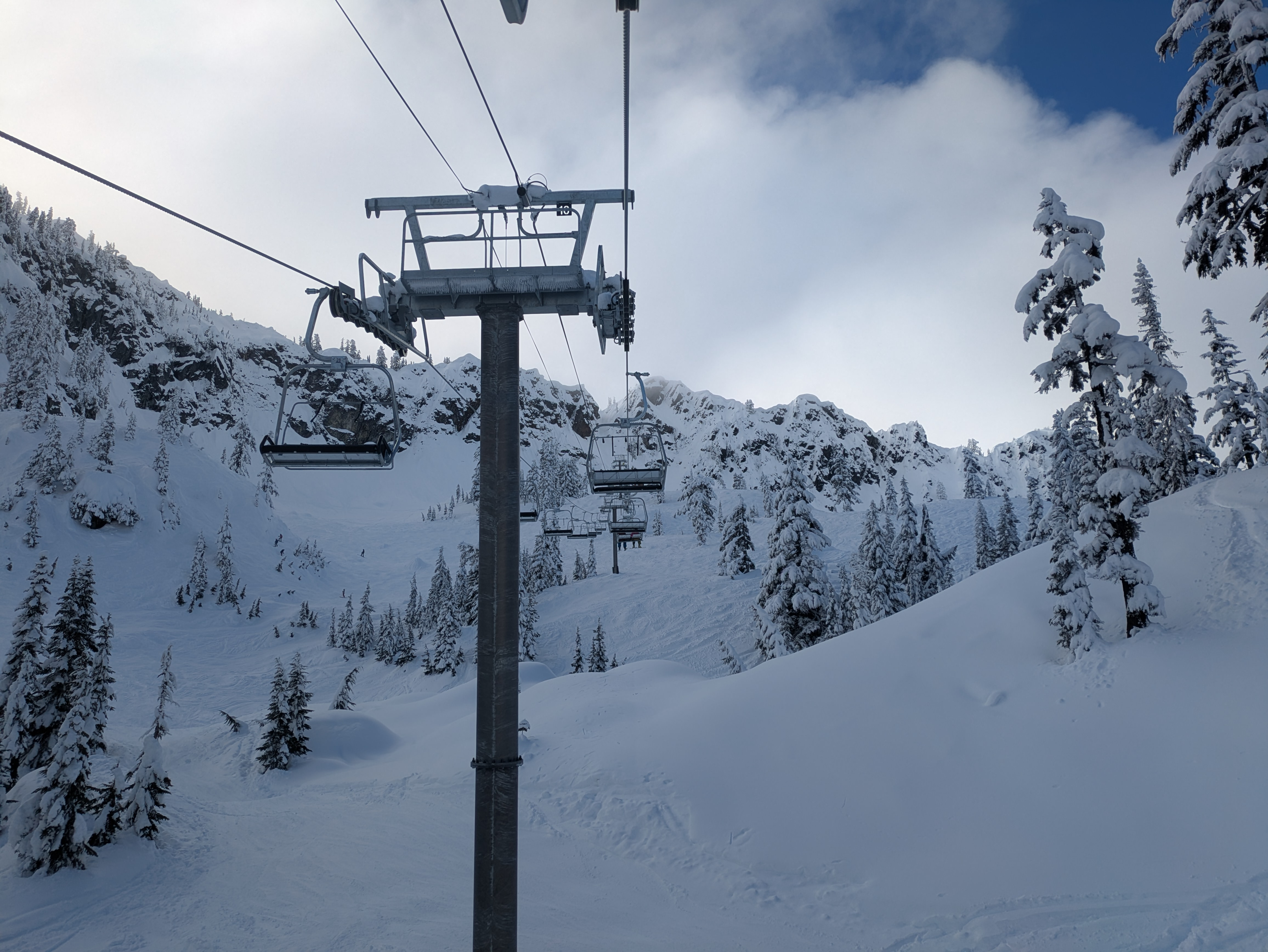
Views from the new Internationale chairlift at Alpental in February 2025

In April 2022, the Summit at Snoqualmie released the Summit 2030 plan, and is the "Future of Your Home Mountain." They said that between 2022 and 2030, there will be many major improvements, "enhancing the experience from Summit East to the top of Alpental." The plan has 5 major projects: Summit Transformed, Summit Summers, ForeverProject, Alpental Aspect, and Easier Escapes.

=== Summit Transformed ===
Summit Transformed is arguably the largest and most important of the five projects. It includes lift upgrades, more snowmaking, and lodge upgrades.

=== The Alpental Aspect ===
Alpental is best known for its expert terrain in contrast with intermediate runs under the cliff, but its lifts were aging, and capacity is very low. They announced 2 new lifts and one lift upgrade. The Sessel chairlift was completed in the summer of 2023 and the addition of new chairs on Armstrong Express were also completed in the same year. Internationale, a lift that leads from the top of the Sessel lift to the Upper Mountain, was built in the summer of 2024. In 2025 the ski resort closed early in order to replace the 2-seat Edelweiss chairlift with a new, higher capacity one.

=== Summit Summers ===
Originally, the Summit at Snoqualmie was a winter resort, but integrated some summer activities like music and scenic lift rides. The Summit continues to plan on opening new summer activities.

== Chairlifts ==
List of Chairlifts at The Summit at Snoqualmie
Name	Area	Type	Status
Armstrong Express	Alpental	High Speed Quad	Operational
Debbie's Gold	Alpental	Double	Removed
Edelweiss	Alpental	Double	Removed
Edelweiss	Alpental	Triple	Construct
Internationale	Alpental	Triple	Operational
Sessel	Alpental	Double	Removed
Sessel	Alpental	Triple	Operational
St. Bernard	Alpental	Double	Operational
Alpine	Summit Central	Double	Removed
Bonanza	Summit Central	Double	Removed
Central Express	Summit Central	High Speed Quad	Operational
Central Express	Summit Central	High Speed Six	Proposed
Easy Street	Summit Central	Double	Operational
Gallery	Summit Central	Double	Operational
Holiday	Summit Central	Double	Removed
Holiday	Summit Central	Quad	Operational
Triple 60 Express	Summit Central	High Speed Quad	Proposed
Reggie's	Summit Central	Double	Operational
Single Chair	Summit Central	Single	Removed
Silver Fir	Summit Central	Triple	Removed
Silver Fir Express	Summit Central	High Speed Quad	Operational
Triple 60	Summit Central	Triple	Operational
Dinosaur	Summit East	Double	Removed
East Peak	Summit East	Triple	Operational
Easy Gold	Summit East	Double	Removed
Hidden Valley	Summit East	Double	Removed
Hidden Valley	Summit East	Triple	Operational
Keechelus	Summit East	Double	Removed
Rampart	Summit East	Quad	Operational
360 Bowl	Summit West	Double	Removed
Beaver Lake	Summit West	Double	Removed
Big Bill	Summit West	Double	Removed
Dodge Ridge	Summit West	Double	Operational
Easy Rider	Summit West	Triple	Removed
Julie's	Summit West	Double	Operational
Little Thunder	Summit West	Quad	Operational
Pacific Crest	Summit West	Quad	Operational
Pacific Crest Express	Summit West	High Speed Six	Proposed
Thunderbird	Summit West	Double	Removed
Wildside	Summit West	Triple	Removed
Wildside	Summit West	Quad	Operational
