= 1999 NCAA Skiing Championships =

American college skiing competition

Tournament information
- Sport: College skiing
- Location: Newry, Maine
- Administrator: NCAA
- Host(s): Bates College
- Venue(s): Sunday River
- Teams: 23
- Number of events: 8

Final positions
- Champions: Colorado (15th overall, 4th co-ed)
- 1st runners-up: Denver
- 2nd runners-up: Vermont

The 1999 NCAA Skiing Championships were contested at the Sunday River ski area, near the town of Newry, Maine, at the 46th annual NCAA-sanctioned ski tournament to determine the individual and team national champions of men's and women's collegiate slalom and cross-country skiing in the United States.

Defending champions Colorado, coached by Richard Rokos, won the team championship, the Buffaloes' fifteenth title overall and fourth as a co-ed team.

== Venue ==
This year's championships were contested at the Sunday River ski area, in Newry, Maine.

Bates College, in Lewiston, Maine, served as hosts.

These were the second championships held at Sunday River and the third in the state of Maine (1967, 1976, and 1999).

== Program ==
=== Men's events ===
- Cross country, 10 kilometer freestyle
- Cross country, 20 kilometer classical
- Slalom
- Giant slalom

=== Women's events ===
- Cross country, 5 kilometer freestyle
- Cross country, 15 kilometer classical
- Slalom
- Giant slalom

== Team scoring ==
NCAA championships site

| Rank | Team | Points |
|---|---|---|
| 1st place, gold medalist(s) | Colorado (DC) | 650 |
| 2nd place, silver medalist(s) | Denver | 636 |
| 3rd place, bronze medalist(s) | Vermont | 600 |
| 4 | Utah | 578 1/2 |
| 5 | New Mexico | 572 |
| 6 | Dartmouth | 539 |
| 7 | Alaska Anchorage | 396 |
| 8 | Middlebury | 369 1/2 |
| 9 | New Hampshire | 357 1/2 |
| 10 | Northern Michigan | 311 |
| 11 | Nevada | 304 1/2 |
| 12 | Williams | 159 1/2 |
| 13 | Bates | 116 1/2 |
| 14 | St. Lawrence | 78 |
| 15 | Montana State | 70 |
| 16 | Wisconsin–Green Bay | 48 |
| 17 | Saint Michael's | 45 |
| 18 | Western State | 36 |
| 19 | Babson | 35 |
| 20 | Clarkson | 31 |
| 21 | Alaska Fairbanks | 21 |
| 22 | St. Olaf | 19 |
| 23 | Colby | 16 |

- DC – Defending champions
- Debut team appearance

== See also ==
- List of NCAA skiing programs
