= American Skiing Company =

American resort operation company

- Formerly: LBO Resort Enterprises Corp
- Company type: Public
- Founded: 1994; 32 years ago
- Founder: Les Otten
- Defunct: 2007

American Skiing Company was one of the largest operators of alpine ski, snowboard and golf resorts in the United States. Its resorts included Sunday River and Sugarloaf in Maine, The Canyons in Utah, Killington, Mount Snow, Haystack, Heavenly and Steamboat. In the early 2000s, the company sold all assets and shut down in 2007.

== History ==
In 1980, Les Otten, the son of a German immigrant, purchased the Sunday River resort for $840,000 from the Sherburne Corporation. Sunday River included one double chair and a couple of surface lifts at the time. Sunday River slowly grew to become New England's second most popular resort in the 1990s.

In 1994, Otten formed LBO Resort Enterprises Corp and purchased Attitash in New Hampshire. By 1995, Sugarbush, Vermont was added to the portfolio of LBO resorts.

In 1996, Otten purchased Mount Cranmore in the Mount Washington Valley of New Hampshire. Later that year, Otten sought to purchase S-K-I Ltd., owners of Killington, Mount Snow, and Haystack, Vermont, Waterville Valley, New Hampshire, and controlling interest in Sugarloaf, Maine. Because of monopoly concerns, the company was only allowed to purchase Killington, Mount Snow, Haystack, and Sugarloaf. Upon acquiring S-K-I Ltd., LBO Resort Enterprises was renamed the American Skiing Company

By 1997, the company expanded west, buying Wolf Mountain in Park City, Utah. It quickly was transformed into The Canyons, now the largest resort in Utah. In 1997, the company, now known as American Skiing Company went public on the New York Stock Exchange and purchased Heavenly, California and Steamboat, Colorado from Kamori International. All American Skiing Company resorts have a Grand Summit Hotel, a condominium-hotel in which investors were to buy a quarter of a year ownership of the hotel room units. The income from these condo quarter-shares was intended to be key to finances of the company.

By the time the new millennium rolled around, Les Otten had left the company amidst a huge debt crises; their earnings had not kept pace with their growth. William (BJ) Fair took over as CEO. As the huge debts racked up, ASC was forced to sell Heavenly to Vail Resorts, Steamboat to Intrawest, and Sugarbush to a group of investors.

In January 2007, rumors surfaced that ASC might be in the process of selling Killington and Pico to Powdr Corporation, and Attitash and Mount Snow to Peak Resorts. It was later confirmed in a letter to the All For One pass holders that Mount Snow and Attitash had been sold to Peak Resorts and that Killington and Pico had been sold to SP Land Company, LLC, who would join with Powdr in a new venture to operate the two mountains.

In June 2007, ASC announced plans to sell Sunday River and Sugarloaf to Boyne Resorts.

Finally in July 2007, it was announced that American Skiing Company's last remaining and flagship resort, The Canyons had been bought by the Talisker Corporation for $100 million. This was the final resort sold by the American Skiing Company, in preparation for the dissolution of the company by September 2007.
