= Pleasant Mountain =

Mountain in Bridgton and Denmark, Maine

Coordinates: 44°01′37″N 70°49′20″W

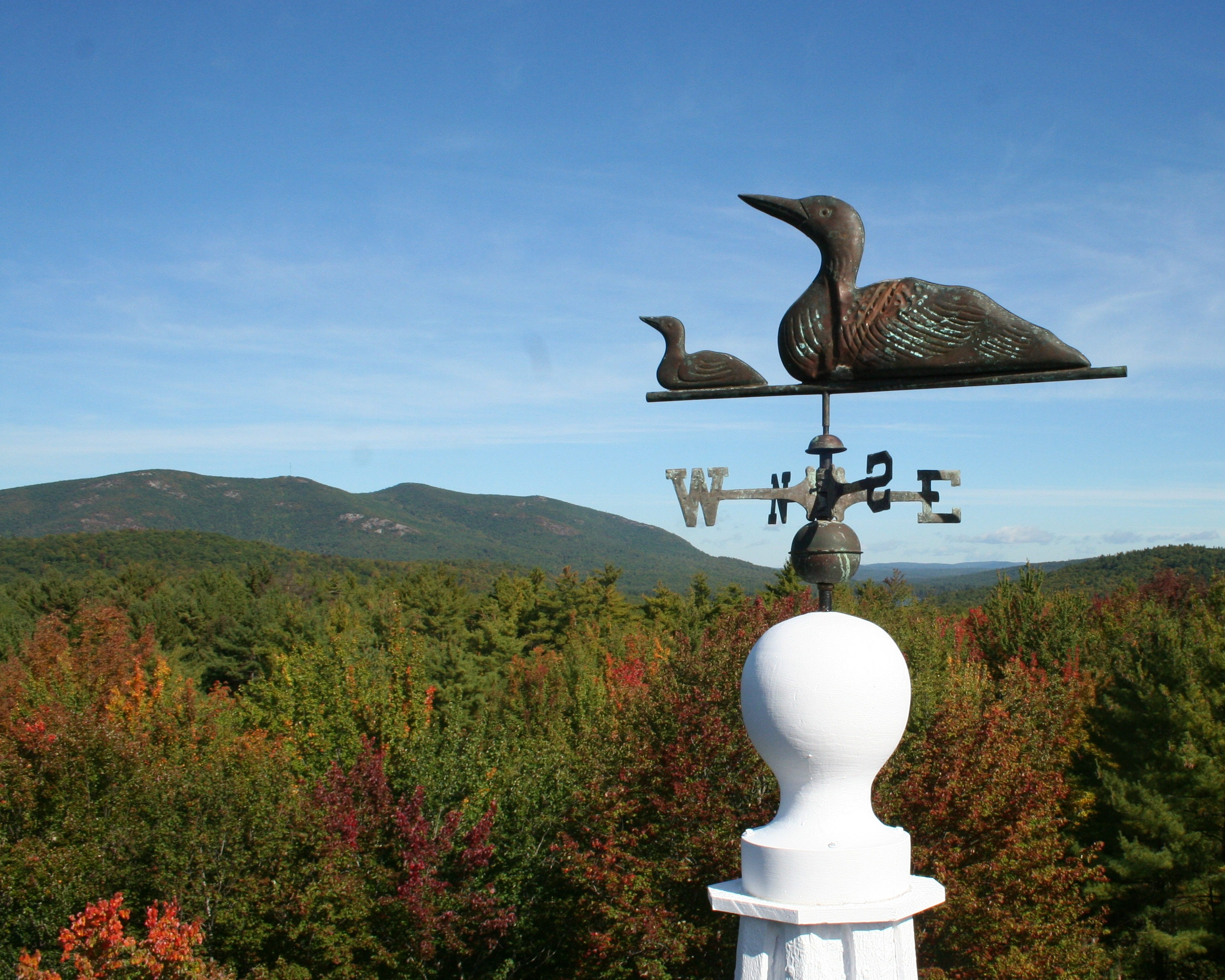
View of Pleasant Mountain

Pleasant Mountain is located in Bridgton and Denmark, Maine, in the United States, and has a summit altitude of 2,006 feet.

Over 2,000 acres on the east side of Pleasant Mountain is owned and managed by Loon Echo Land Trust. The Trust also maintains the 10-mile trail network on the mountain. Pleasant Mountain Ski Area is located on the north side of the mountain. The northern slope of the Pleasant Mountain is also the highest point in Cumberland County, Maine.
