= Loon Mountain Ski Resort =

Ski resort in Lincoln, New Hampshire, United States

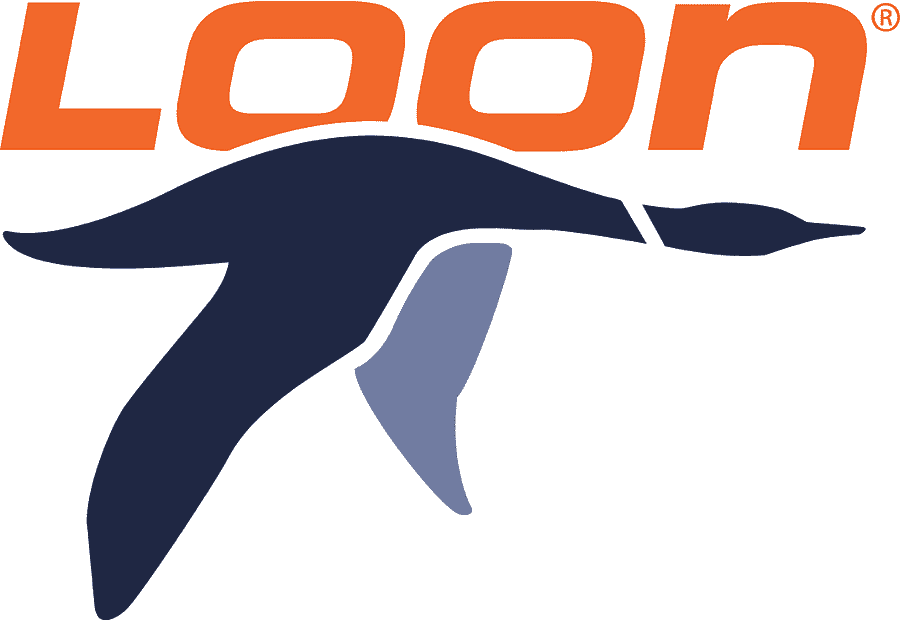
- Interactive map of Loon Mountain Ski Resort
- Location: Lincoln / Livermore, New Hampshire, U.S.
- Nearest city: Lincoln, New Hampshire
- Coordinates: 44°2′10″N 71°37′18″W
- Status: Operating
- Owner: Boyne Resorts
- Vertical: 2,190 feet (670 m)
- Top elevation: 3,050 feet (930 m)
- Base elevation: 860 feet (260 m)
- Skiable area: 403 acres (163 ha)
- Trails: 73; 19% Beginner; 53% Intermediate; 28% Expert
- Longest run: Bear Claw 2.5 miles
- Lift system: 13 Total (1 4 Passenger Gondola, 1 High Speed 8 Passenger Lift, 3 High Speed Quads, 2 Quads, 4 Doubles, 2 carpets
- Lift capacity: 17,152 skiers/hour
- Terrain parks: Yes, 6
- Snowfall: 163 inches (4.1 m)
- Snowmaking: Yes, 86.3%
- Website: loonmtn.com

Loon Mountain Ski Resort is a ski resort in Lincoln, Grafton County, New Hampshire, United States. It is located on Loon Mountain and sits within the White Mountain National Forest. Its vertical drop of 2,190 feet (670 m) is the eighth largest in New England and has three peaks.

== History ==
The history of Loon Mountain Ski Resort can be traced back to former governor and New Hampshire native Sherman Adams. Adams spent much of his time growing up in the town of Lincoln, New Hampshire, and attended nearby Dartmouth College. After departing from his position of Chief of Staff in Eisenhower's cabinet, Adams proclaimed he went off "to operate a ski lodge" in 1958. Following his departure from Washington D.C, he founded Loon Mountain Corporation, which later contributed to the construction of Loon Mountain in the fall of 1965.

Loon Mountain officially opened in December 1966 with 12 trails over 80 acres. The terrain was served by a 4-passenger gondola and two Hall double chairlifts. A hotel was built the following year, and third double chairlift serving new advanced terrain was built in 1968.

More expansions followed over the next two decades. West Basin debuted in 1978, featuring a new base area, a dedicated beginner area, and another double chairlift. In 1984, the North Peak area was completed, featuring a CTEC triple and another lodge, and increasing Loon's vertical to 2,100 feet.

From the late 1980s to the early 90s, Loon began pursuing an expansion to the west. While the United States Forest Service approved the plan in 1993, the expansion was halted after two lawsuits were filed by the United States Court of Appeals for the First Circuit based on potential environmental impacts. These were not settled until 2001. A scaled-down proposal was approved and finally completed in 2007 as the South Peak complex. It now features a high-speed quad and 7 trails.

As of 2022, the location has 73 trails and 13 chairlifts.

In of 2024, improvements were made to snowmaking technology, including the addition of 100 new semi-automated snowmaking hydrants. Also added was the Kancamagus 8, an eight-seat D-Line Doppelmayr chair. This eight seat chair is noted as "a first-of-its-kind lift for New England".

=== Ownership History ===
Loon Mountain was acquired by Booth Creek Ski Holdings in 1997. Booth Creek sold Loon Mountain to CNL Lifestyle in 2006, but continued to operate the resort. On September 19, 2007, Boyne Resorts, a Michigan-based resort company, announced it had acquired the lease to operate Loon from Booth Creek. It also increased the number of snow guns by 170 to a total of 600, at a total cost of $1.4 million. Loon Mountain was among several resorts sold by CNL to Och-Ziff Capital Management in 2016. Boyne purchased the ski area in March 2018 and has been operating it since.

== Gallery ==
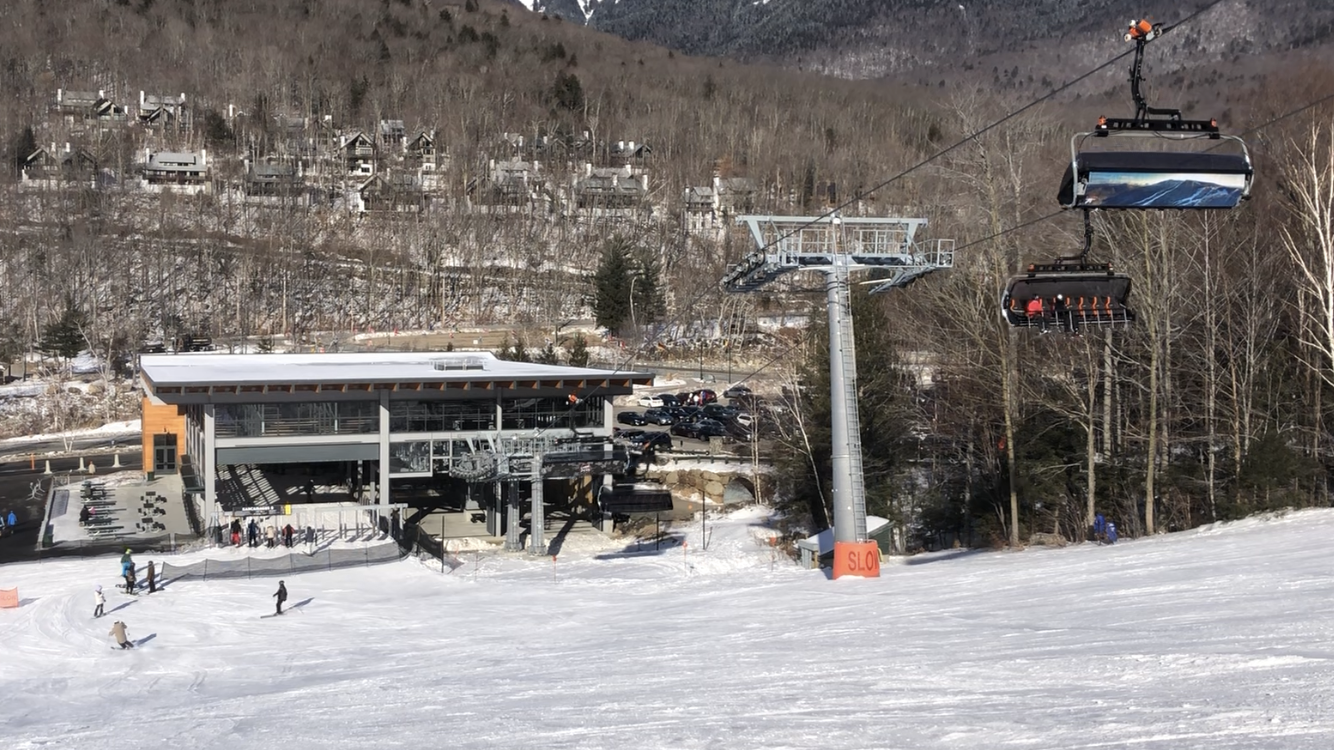
Kanc8 loading area, January 2022.

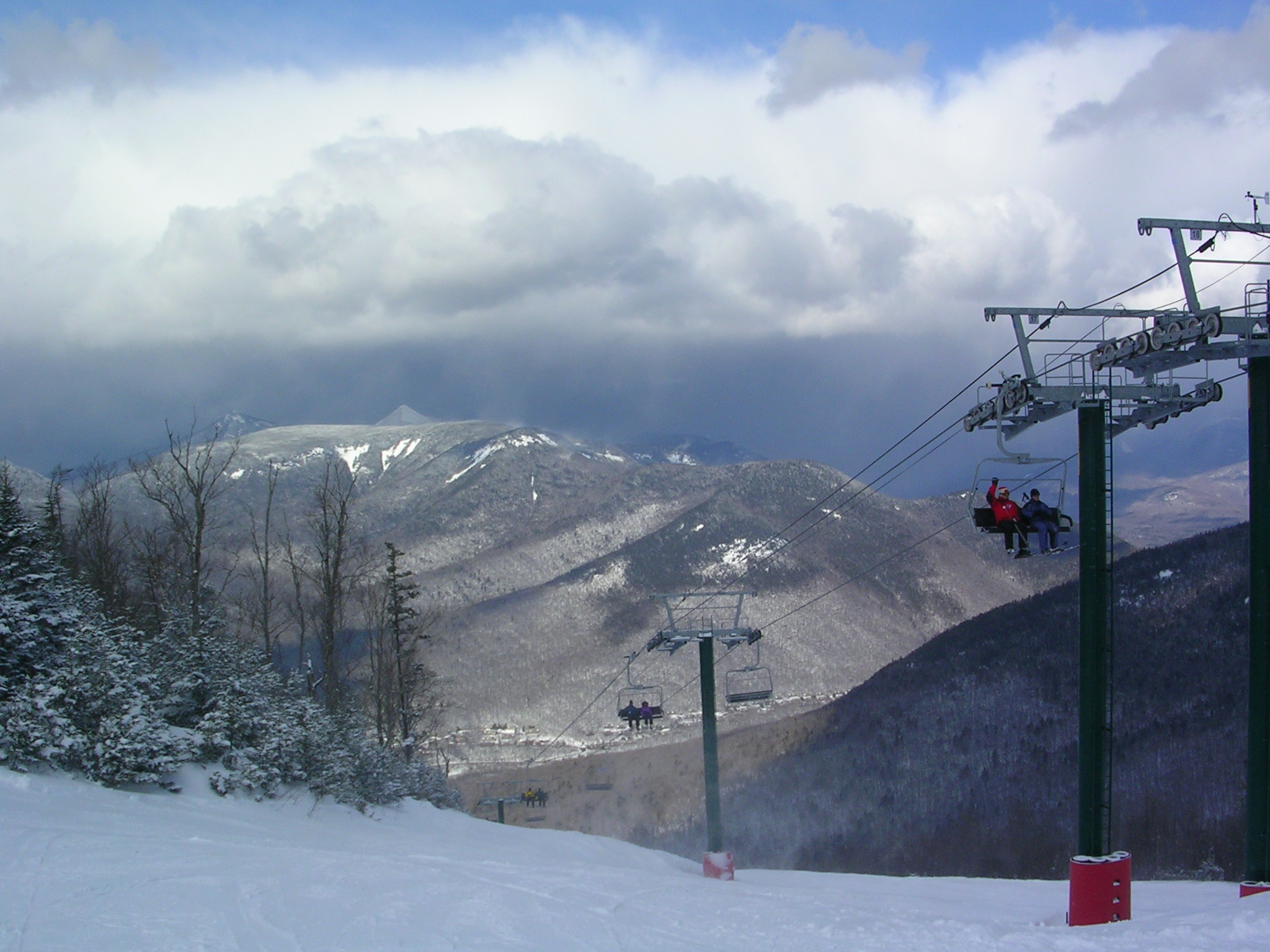
Loon Mountain view from the top of the North Peak quad, 2007.

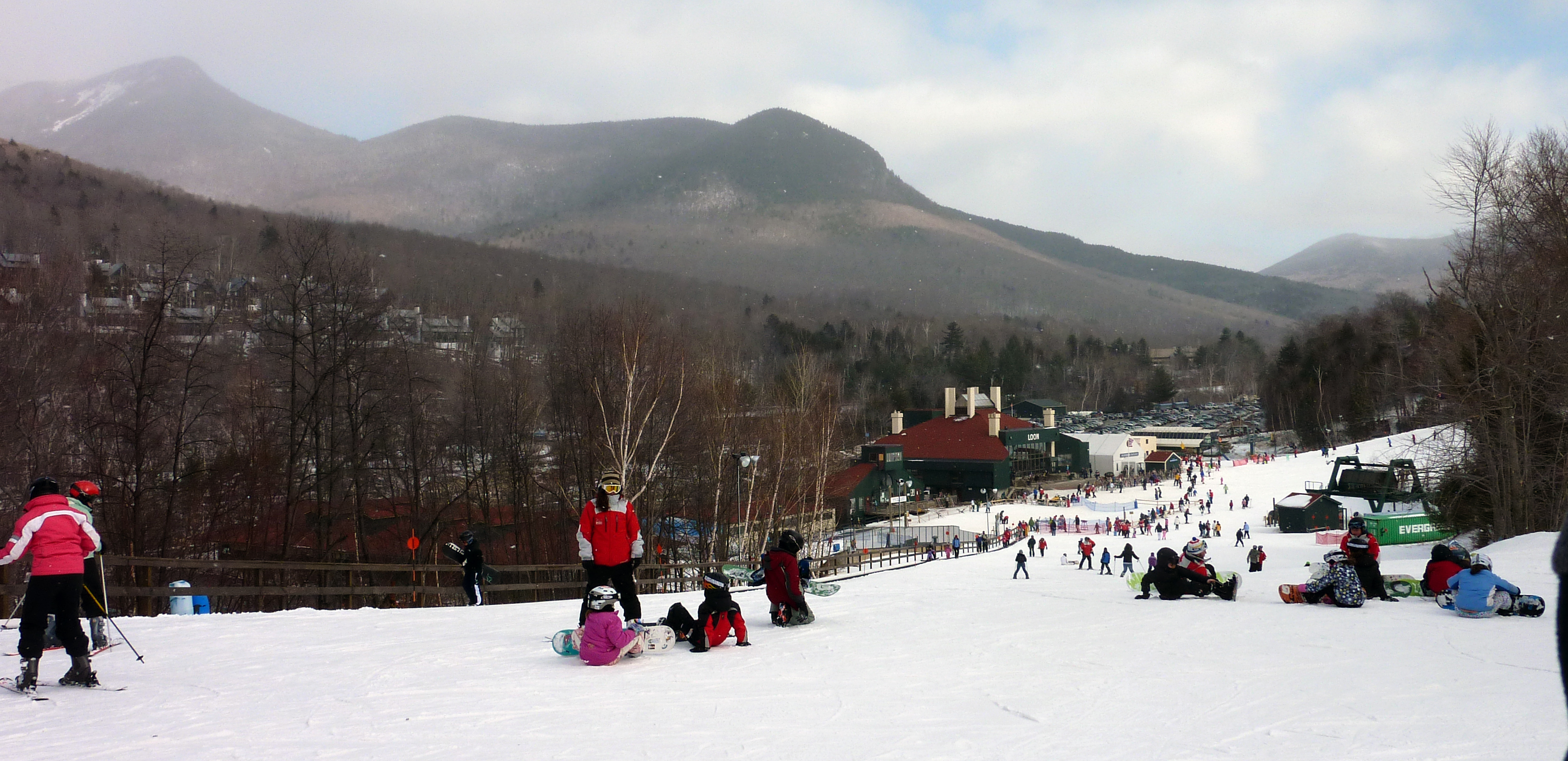
View from one of the beginner slopes, called "Sarsaparilla".

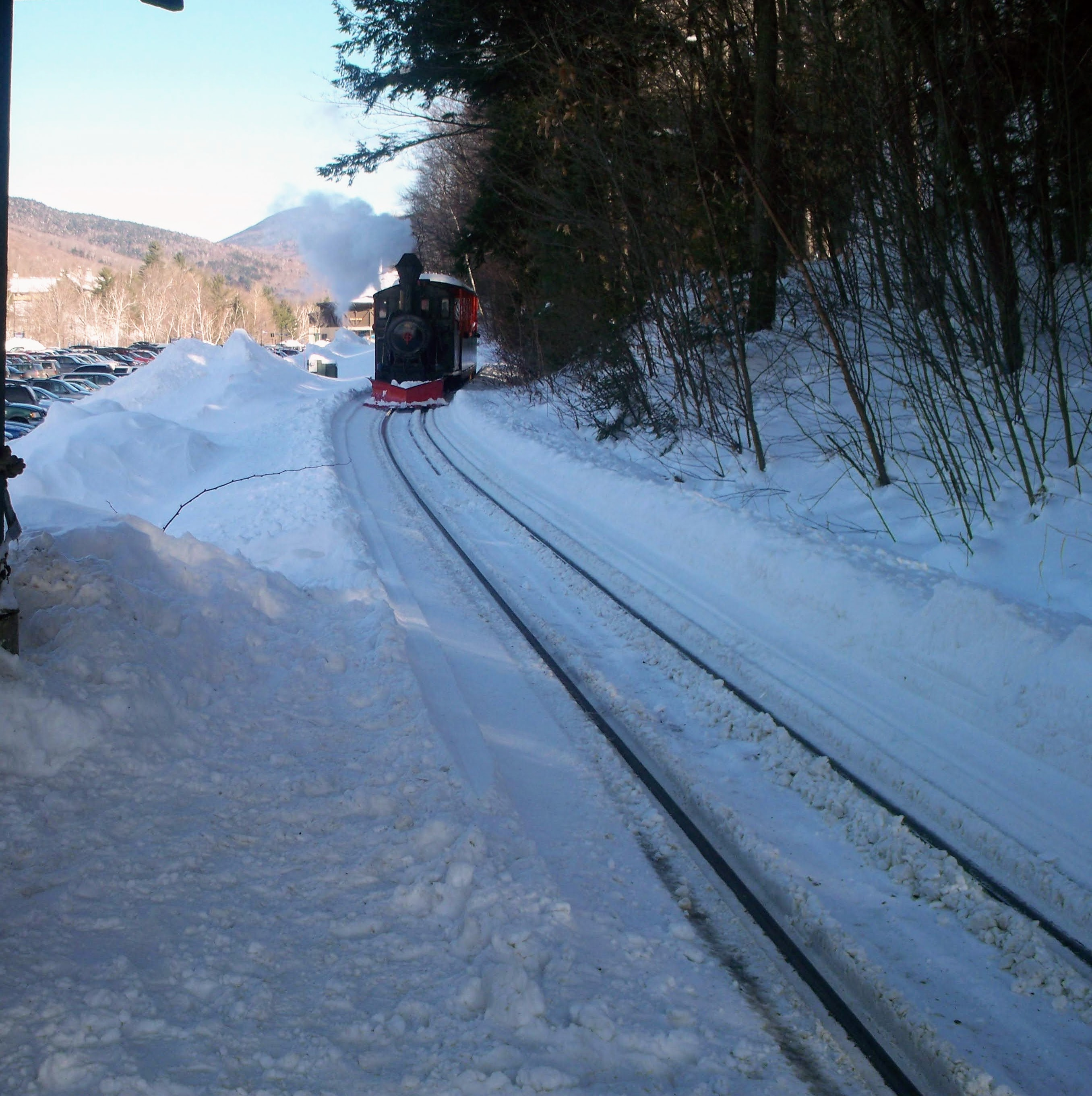
J.E Henry Railroad with steam-powered locomotive on narrow-gauge railway
