= Whaleback (ski area) =

Ski area in New Hampshire, United States

Coordinates: 43°36′05″N 72°10′53″W

- Interactive map of Whaleback
- Nearest city: Enfield, New Hampshire
- Vertical: 700 ft (210 m)
- Top elevation: 1,800 ft (550 m)
- Base elevation: 1,100 ft (340 m)
- Skiable area: 85 acres (34 ha)
- Trails: 30
- Longest run: 1 mi (1.6 km)
- Terrain parks: 1
- Snowfall: 110 inches (280 cm)
- Snowmaking: Yes
- Night skiing: Yes
- Website: http://www.whaleback.com/

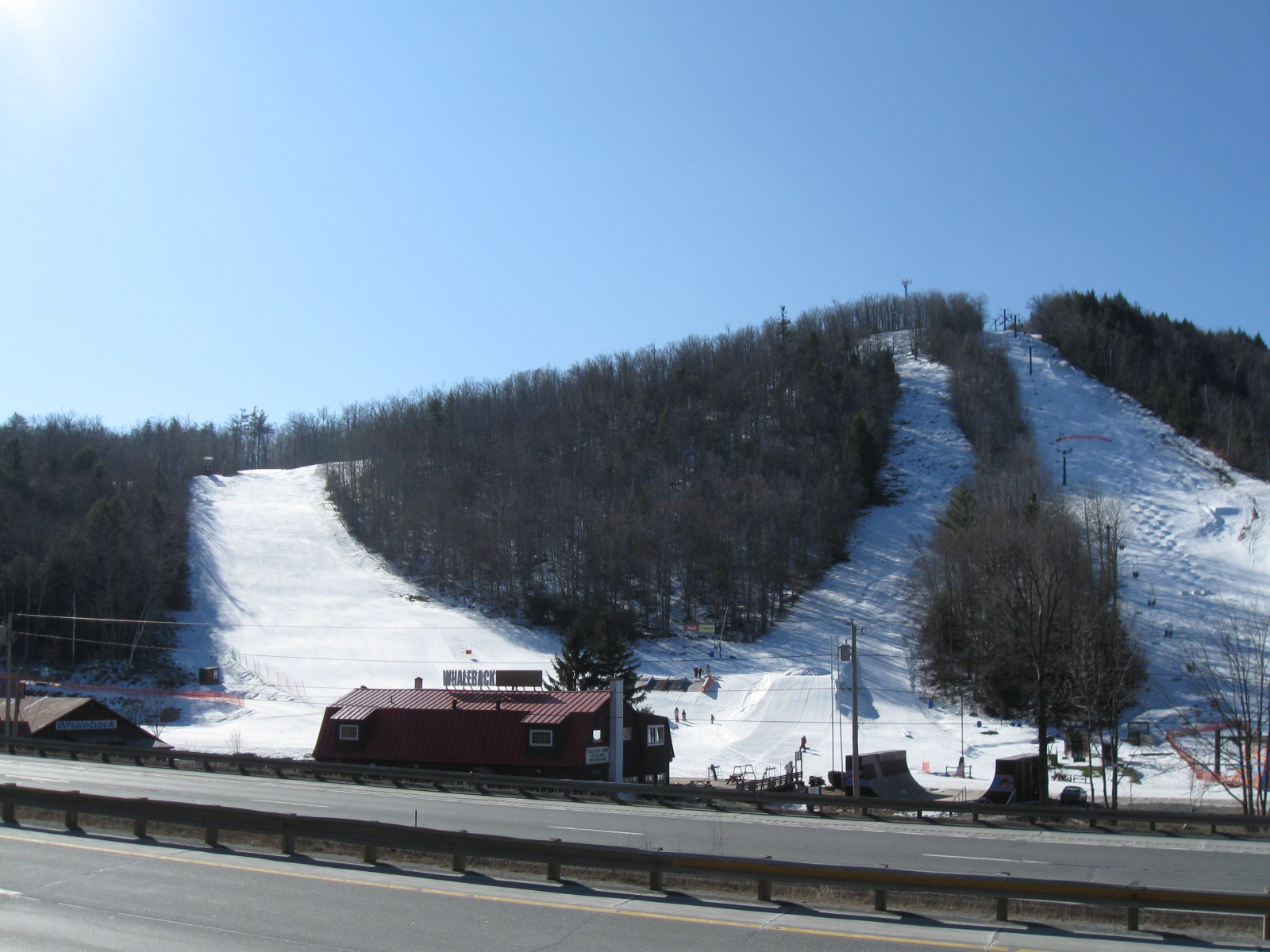
View of ski area from Interstate 89

Whaleback is a ski area located in Enfield, New Hampshire, United States. In 2013, after several bankruptcies over previous decades, it was bought by operated by a non-profit organization called the Upper Valley Snow Sports Foundation.

== History ==
The ski area dates to 1956, when a small slope called Snow Crest Ski Area was developed by Lebanon Outing Club ski jumping champion Ernest Dion. It had a 1,500-foot (460 m) T-bar and a 600-foot (180 m) rope tow for novices.

Snow Crest closed in 1968 and was reopened in 1970 as Whaleback Ski Area by Jim Griffiths. In the 1970s Whaleback was a vibrant community ski area known for its "Ski Week" where community members trained to become ski instructors for local kids during February school vacation. Whaleback was sold and had multiple owners during the 1980s, operating continuously until 2001 when then-owner Timothy Herbert closed it. On 8 December 2004, Herbert sold Whaleback to Evan Dybvig, a former freestyle skier for the US Ski Team. In preparation for its reopening, $1 million was spent in renovating the area, which opened for the 2005-2006 ski season. Dybvig intended for the ski area to diversify its offerings into the freestyle sports market, including constructing an indoor sports facility. However, after several investors dropped out of the project, and a planned loan from the Small Business Administration failed to materialize, these plans were dropped. During the area's first two seasons, poor weather hurt it financially, leading to a program announced in August 2006 where individuals could pay to either place a plaque on or paint one of the chairs on Whaleback's chairlift. As of 2010, the ski area employed between five and nine employees, and had a revenue of between $500,000 and $1 million per year.

On 14 March 2013, Whaleback announced that high debt had led the mountain to close. According to Dybvig, Whaleback owed its creditors more than $1 million, and was unable to raise additional funding, leading it to liquidate before it was forced into foreclosure.

During the summer of 2013, a local non-profit organization, the Upper Valley Snow Sports Foundation (UVSSF), was established to operate and eventually purchase the mountain. An initial round of fundraising raised about $200,000, enough to reopen Whaleback for the 2013–2014 season. The UVSSF signed an agreement with the owner of the property, Randolph National Bank, to operate the ski area for a year, and purchased it in 2013 for $650,000. It is seeking to raise money to purchase a second parcel adjoining the ski area.

During the 2024–25 season, the singular chairlift to the top of the mountain broke, ending that years ski season early and requiring Whaleback to begin fundraising to cover the cost of repairs and the lost revenue from a shorter season.

== Mountain statistics ==
Whaleback has 30 trails on 85 acres (34 ha) of skiable terrain. 28% of the trails are rated as easy, 39% are intermediate, and 33% are advanced. The longest trail is 1 mi (1.6 km) long. There is one terrain park, and 60% of the terrain has snowmaking installed on it. There are four lifts: a double chair, a T-Bar, a magic carpet and a handle tow. The mountain's base elevation is at 1,100 ft (340 m), and the summit is at 1,800 ft (550 m), for a vertical drop of 700 ft (210 m). Whaleback has an average annual snowfall of 110 inches (280 cm).
