= Sunday River (ski resort) =

Ski area in Newry, Maine

Sunday River Ski Resort

- Location within the United States Location within Maine
- Location: Newry, Maine, U.S.
- Nearest city: Portland
- Coordinates: 44.4734°N 70.8569°W
- Status: Operating
- Owner: Boyne Resorts
- Vertical: 2,340 ft (713 m)
- Top elevation: 3,140 ft (957 m)
- Base elevation: 800 ft (244 m)
- Skiable area: 870 acres (3.5 km^{2})
- Trails: 135; 33% Beginner; 36% Intermediate; 19% Advanced; 12% Expert
- Longest run: Lollapalooza 3 mi (5 km)
- Lift system: 20 (16 Chairlifts): • 1 High-Speed 8-Pack • 1 High-Speed 6-Pack • 1 Chondola • 2 High-Speed Quads • 5 Quads • 5 Triples • 1 Double • 1 T-Bar • 3 Surface Lifts
- Snowfall: 155 in (390 cm)
- Snowmaking: Yes, 95%
- Night skiing: Yes
- Website: www.sundayriver.com

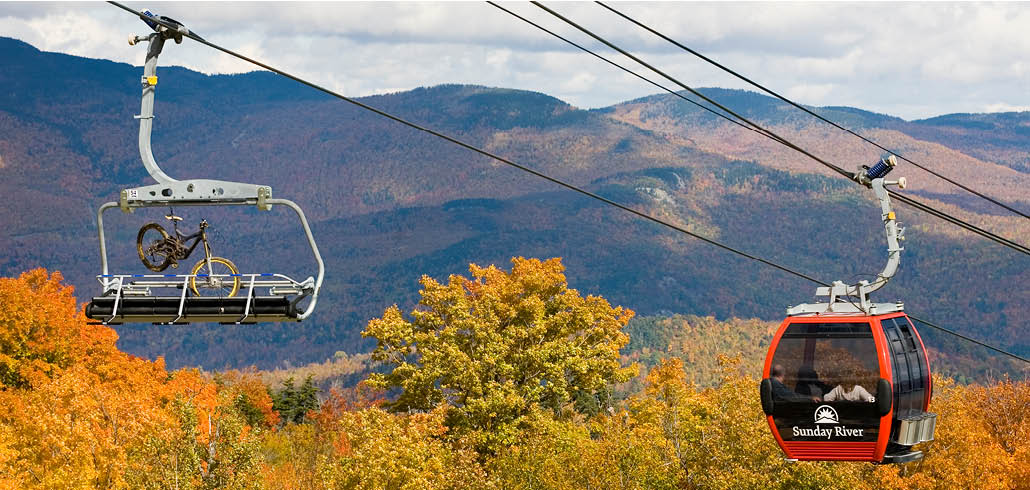
The Chondola during the fall. Notice the chairlift converted to carry a mountain bike.

Sunday River is a ski resort in the northeastern United States, located in Newry, Maine, One of Maine's largest and most visited ski resorts, its vertical drop of 2,340 feet (713 m) is the second largest in Maine (after Sugarloaf) and the sixth largest in New England. The resort features 139 trails across eight interconnected mountain peaks, and is serviced by a network of 19 lifts.

In 1960, Sunday River had four ski runs, a t-bar lift and a rope-tow lift, lift fees were US$3.50 (or $1 for tow-rope), and the ski season was from approximately December 20 to April 15.

Sunday River and its sister resort Sugarloaf have been operated by Boyne Resorts since being sold by American Skiing Company in 2007 for a combined $77 million. The resort's land has been owned by CNL Lifestyle, then Och-Ziff Capital Management, and leased back to Boyne.

In 2018, Boyne Resorts completed the purchase of all leased ski areas in New England from CNL Lifestyle.

== Vertical descent ==
Vertical Descent of the mountain, as well as the vertical descent from the chairlifts.

- Total Vertical: 2,340 ft.
- White Cap: 1,630 ft.
- Locke Mountain: 1,460 ft.
- Barker Mountain: 1,400 ft.
- Spruce Peak: 1,500 ft.
- North Peak: 1,000 ft.
- South Ridge: 500 ft.
- Aurora Peak: 1,100 ft.
- Oz: 1,100 ft.
- Jordan Bowl: 1,490 ft.

== Gallery ==
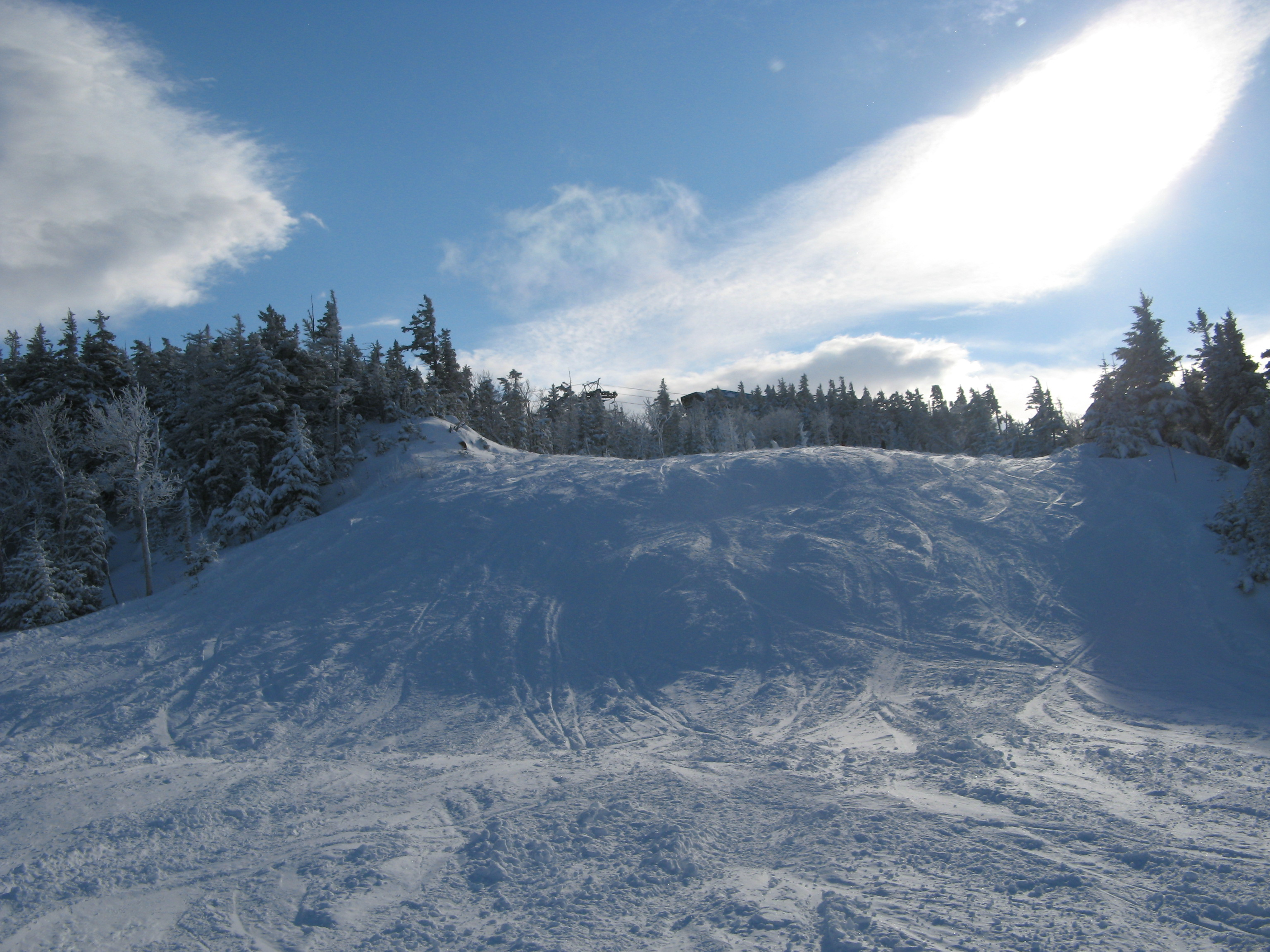
Looking up toward the Jordan Bowl summit.

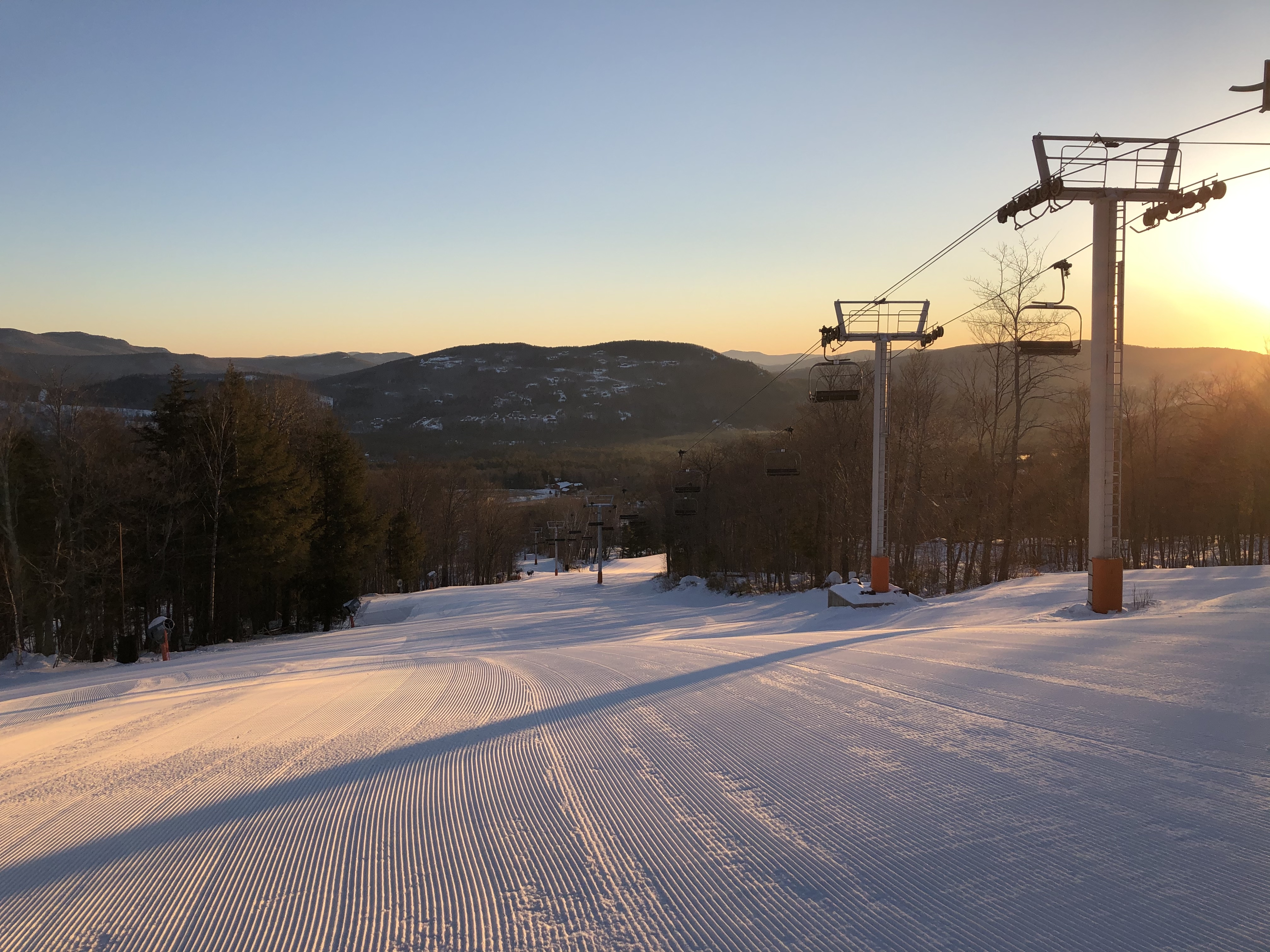
Sunrise over lift #2, early January 2021.

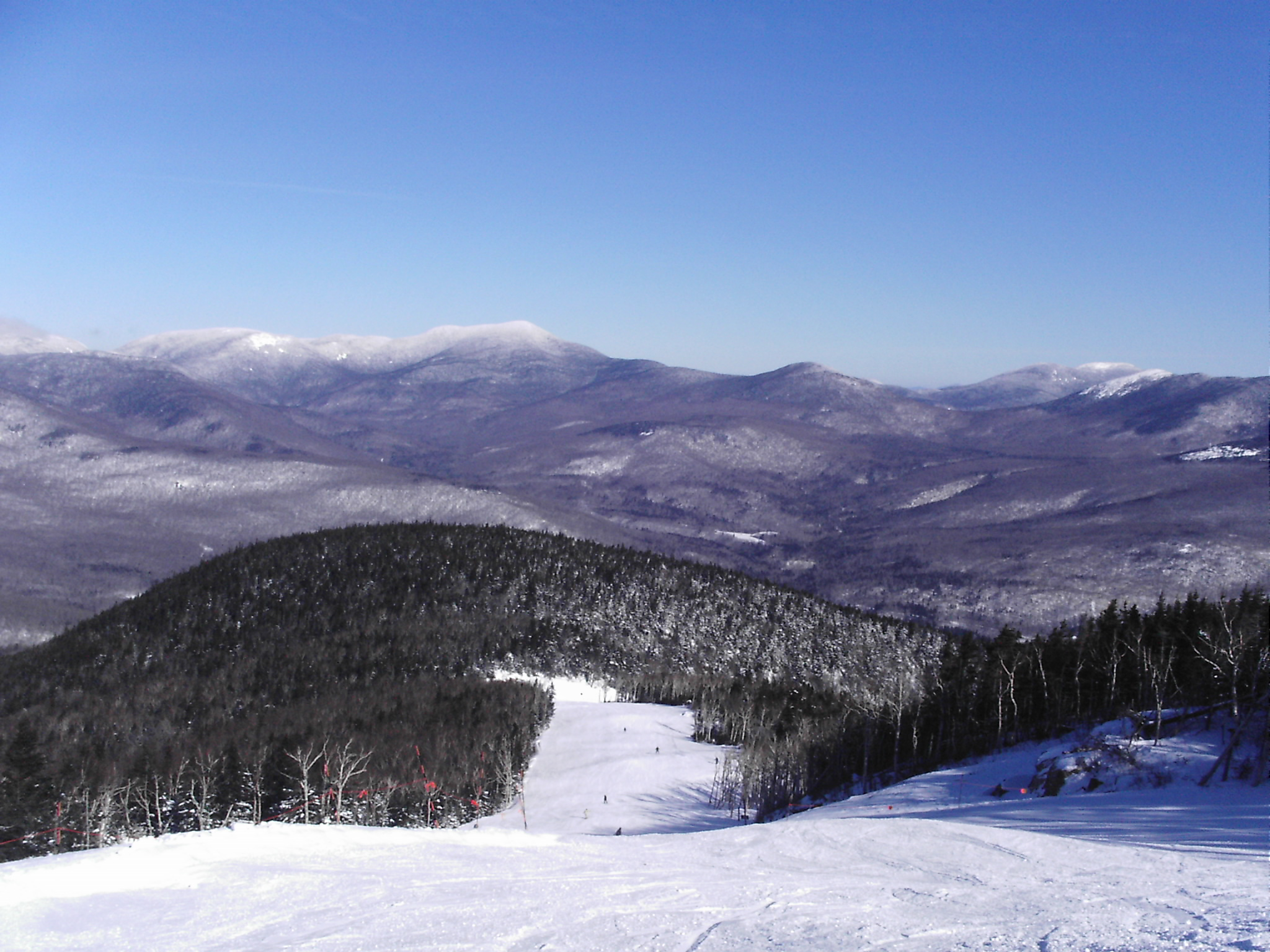
Sunday River from the Jordan Bowl, with Old Speck Mountain on center horizon.

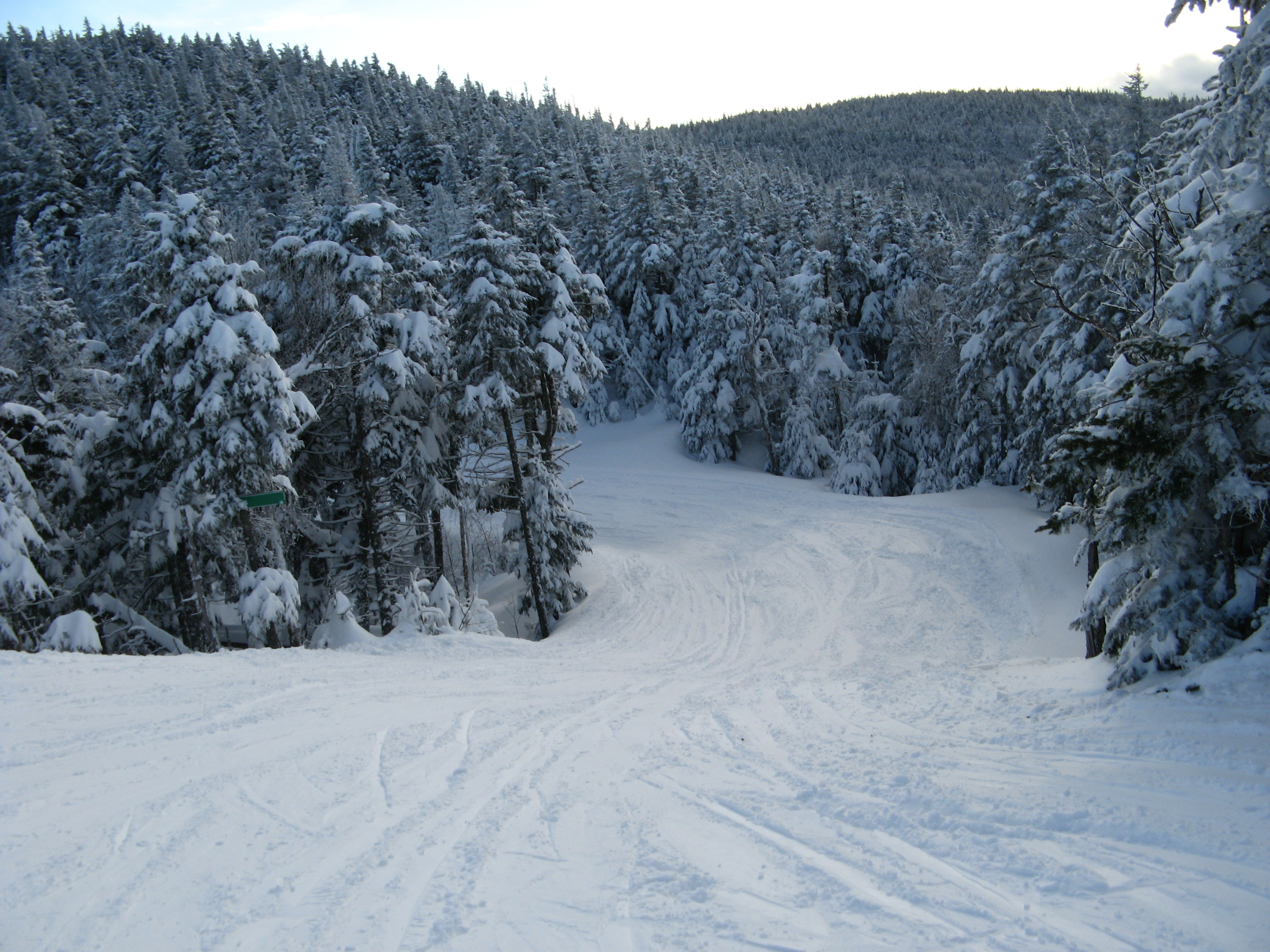
Looking down the trail "Kansas."

== Competition ==
Sunday River is home to the Gould Academy Competition Program for skiing. The program is for junior skiers in Alpine skiing (slalom, giant slalom, super G and downhill), Freestyle skiing (moguls and freeride), and Snowboarding (halfpipe, slopestyle, Slalom, Giant Slalom and boardercross), and runs from mid November through March.

Sunday River hosted the NCAA skiing championships in 1976, 1999, and 2009. It is home to the Dumont Cup, created by Simon Dumont.

- Dumont Cup

In 2009, Simon Dumont wanted to create an opportunity for young and rising skiers to gain exposure and decided to host it at his home mountain, Sunday River in Newry, Maine. Six Dumont Cups later, the success stories of amateur skiers like Nick Geopper and Gus Kenworthy winning the Dumont Cup and stepping into the pro scene has help achieve Simon's vision. The event was eventually officially discontinued in 2016, and the last competition held in March 2015 on the T72 terrain park.

- Frozen Rush

In early 2014, the first Frozen Rush race was held on the slopes. It was the first off-road race of its type on snow. The event featured a match race of the United States' top short course off-road racing drivers racing their trophy trucks. Ricky Johnson beat Johnny Greaves to win the inaugural event.

- Bust 'N' Burn!

The Bust 'N' Burn was an annual mogul skiing competition held in mid-April. The event was open to all skiers willing to participate, and was held in various locations year-to-year around the mountain. It was held annually from 1987 to 2009, and was brought back after a decade-long hiatus in 2024. The re-branded event in 2024 was held on the White Heat trail, and was well received by many skiers and riders. The event also saw multiple Olympic athletes attend the event, including Troy Murphy, competing under the persona of "Donnie Pelletier", Troy's stereotype of the Maine way of life.

== Santa Sunday ==
The Santa Sunday ski is an annual charitable event held at Sunday River. A limited number of tickets, usually between 250-300, are sold for the event held on a Sunday before Christmas. The Santas take the South Ridge Express and then ski down Broadway, a green trail. South Ridge is the best location for spectators. Participants can ski or board but must wear: a red Santa hat with white pompom, a red Santa jacket, a pair of red Santa pants, and a Santa beard. The first Santa Sunday ski was in 2000.

== See also ==
- Sunday River Ski Train
