= King Pine =

King Pine Ski Area at Purity Spring Resort
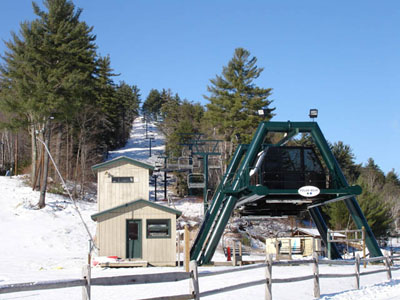
- The Polar Bear Triple Chairlift
- Interactive map of King Pine Ski Area at Purity Spring Resort
- Location: Madison, New Hampshire, US
- Nearest city: Berlin, NH
- Coordinates: 43°52′17″N 71°05′22″W
- Vertical: 350 ft (110 m)
- Trails: 17 trails – 44% Beginner – 31% Intermediate – 25% Advanced
- Longest run: Pokey Pine
- Lift system: 6 chairs: 3 Triples, 2 Surface Lifts, 1 Tubing Tow
- Snowmaking: 100%
- Night skiing: Currently open daily during the season until 6 p.m.
- Website: http://www.kingpine.com/

King Pine Ski Area is an all-ages ski resort located in the White Mountains near Madison, New Hampshire, United States.

King Pine has 45 skiable acres, with six ski lifts and seventeen trails. King Pine also has 20 kilometers of skate and track groomed cross country trails as well as snowshoeing, Zamboni-groomed ice skating, snowtubing, and a PSIA-certified ski school.

== Amenities ==
=== Skiing and snowboarding ===
King Pine features 17 trails with easy-to-navigate terrain that is accessed by 6 lifts, as well as base lodge amenities, a cafeteria, tavern, and slopeside lodging.

44% of King Pine's terrain is designed for novice skiers and riders, and 31% is designated as intermediate.

Adventure can be found on Pitch Pine (one of New England's steepest trails) or in the Twisted Pine Terrain Park which is complete with hits, rails and challenging elements.

==== Night skiing ====
King Pine offers illuminated trails for skiing and snowboarding in the evening. Hours of operation vary. Eight trails are open at night and are served by two triple chairlifts: Powder Bear and Polar Bear. The following trails have night skiing available: White Pine, King Pine, East Slope, West Slope, Pine Cone, Pine Board, Pine Spills, Knotty Pine, Scotch Pine and Crooked Pine.

=== Snowtubing ===
The Pine Meadows Snowtubing Park has three snowtubing lanes, each of which are serviced by a tow rope.

=== Ice skating ===
The Tohko Dome is an outdoor, covered ice rink. It is Zamboni groomed weekly as conditions permit. The ice rink has an outdoor firepit, lights for skating at night and music.

=== Nordic skiing ===
The Purity Spring XC & Snowshoe Reserve features 20 km of scenic, back-country Nordic, and snowshoe trails. The trails wind through the forest surrounding Purity Lake, twisting through tall pines to the adjacent New Hampshire Audubon wildlife sanctuary. Cross-country skis are available in the King Pine Rental and Tune Shop.

=== Snowshoeing ===
There are 20 km of snowshoe trails around King Pine and Purity Spring, including the adjacent New Hampshire Audubon wildlife sanctuary. Snowshoe rentals are available in the King Pine Rental and Tune Shop.
