= 1975 NCAA Skiing Championships =

Skiing competitions during 1975

Coordinates: 37.63°N 107.815°W

Tournament information
- Sport: College skiing
- Location: Durango, Colorado
- Dates: March 5–8, 1975
- Administrator: NCAA
- Host: Fort Lewis College
- Venue: Durango Mountain
- Teams: 13
- Number of events: 4 (6 titles)

Final positions
- Champions: Colorado (6th title)
- 1st runners-up: Vermont
- 2nd runners-up: Wyoming

The 1975 NCAA Skiing Championships were contested at Durango Mountain ski area, north of Durango, Colorado, at the 22nd annual NCAA-sanctioned ski tournament to determine the individual and team national champions of men's collegiate alpine, cross country skiing, and ski jumping in the United States.

Three-time defending champion Colorado, coached by alumnus Bill Marolt, captured their sixth national championship, finishing 68 points ahead of runner-up Vermont, the largest victory margin to date.

Repeat champions were Wyoming's Steiner Hybertsen (cross country), Colorado's Didrik Ellefsen (jumping), and Stig Hallingbye (nordic) of Wyoming; Hybertsen's win was his third consecutive. Denver's Peik Christensen reclaimed his slalom title of two years earlier; he entered the week as the two-time defending champion in alpine.

This was the last time for the downhill event at the NCAA championships; it was replaced by giant slalom in 1976.

== Venue ==
This year's championships were held March 5–8 in Colorado at Durango Mountain in the San Juan Mountains of La Plata County, north of Durango. Fort Lewis College in Durango served as host.

These were the first NCAA championships at Durango, and the seventh in Colorado; previous sites were Winter Park (1956, 1959, 1972), Crested Butte (1966), and Steamboat Springs (1968, 1969).

== Team scoring ==
Location in the United States
Location in Colorado

Rank	Team	Points
1st place, gold medalist(s)	Colorado	183
2nd place, silver medalist(s)	Vermont	115
3rd place, bronze medalist(s)	Wyoming	93
4	Northern Michigan	85.5
5	Denver	83
6	Utah	78
7	Western State	68.5
8	Dartmouth	64
9	Middlebury	44
10	Fort Lewis	43
11	Montana State	24
12	Nevada–Reno	18
13	Boise State	15

== Individual events ==
Four events were held, which yielded six individual titles.

- Wednesday: Downhill
- Thursday: Cross Country
- Friday: Slalom
- Saturday: Jumping

Event	Champion		
Event	Skier	Team	Time/Score
Alpine	Mark Ford	Colorado	2:31.45
Cross Country	(Norway) Steiner Hybertsen (3)	Wyoming	53:53.06
Downhill	Mark Ford	Colorado	1:14.80
Jumping	(Norway) Didrik Ellefsen (2)	Colorado	214.2
Nordic	(Norway) Stig Hallingbye (2)	Wyoming	6:37.0
Slalom	(Norway) Peik Christensen (2)	Denver	1:48.83

== See also ==
- List of NCAA skiing programs
