= 1972 NCAA Skiing Championships =

American college skiing competition

Coordinates: 39.887°N 105.763°W

Tournament information
- Sport: College skiing
- Location: Winter Park, Colorado
- Dates: March 16–18, 1972
- Administrator: NCAA
- Host: Colorado
- Venue: Winter Park Ski Area
- Teams: 16
- Number of events: 4 (7 titles)

Final positions
- Champions: Colorado (3rd title)
- 1st runners-up: Denver
- 2nd runners-up: Wyoming

The 1972 NCAA Skiing Championships were contested in Winter Park, Colorado at the nineteenth annual NCAA-sanctioned ski tournament to determine the individual and team national champions of men's collegiate alpine, cross country skiing, and ski jumping in the United States.

Host Colorado, coached by alumnus Bill Marolt, captured their third national championship (and first since 1960), finishing 5.2 points ahead of three-time defending champion Denver in the team standings.

Colorado's Mike Porcarelli reclaimed the slalom and alpine titles he won two years earlier; the repeat champions were Otto Tschudi of Denver in downhill and Bruce Cunningham of New Hampshire in Nordic combined. Denver's Odd Hammernes won his second jumping title, three years after the first.

In the downhill race, Utah sophomore David Novelle was killed after he lost a ski, went off the course, and collided with a tree. As a result, the Utah team withdrew from the competition.

== Venue ==
This year's championships were held March 16–18 in Colorado at Winter Park, west of Denver.

The nineteenth edition, these were the sixth NCAA Championships in Colorado and the third at Winter Park (1956, 1959); the others were at Crested Butte (1966) and Steamboat Springs (1968, 1969).

== Team scoring ==
Location in the United States
Location in Colorado

Rank	Team	Points
1st place, gold medalist(s)	Colorado	385.3
2nd place, silver medalist(s)	Denver	380.3
3rd place, bronze medalist(s)	Wyoming	373.0
4	Middlebury	368.9
5	Dartmouth	367.0
6	Fort Lewis	360.9
7	New Hampshire	359.3
8	Nevada–Reno	324.6
9	Northern Michigan	310.5
10	Idaho	290.0
11	Michigan Tech	249.7
12	Montana	220.3
13	Weber State	181.3
14	Western State	93.0
15	Alaska Methodist	92.9
16	Utah	92.0

== Individual events ==
Four events were held, which yielded seven individual titles.

- Thursday: Downhill, Cross Country
- Friday: Slalom
- Saturday: Jumping

Event	Champion		
Event	Skier	Team	Time/Score
Alpine	Mike Porcarelli (2)	Colorado	2:19.6
Cross Country	(Norway) Stale Engen	Wyoming	52:24
Downhill	(Norway) Otto Tschudi (3)	Denver	1:09.22
Jumping	(Norway) Odd Hammernes (2)	Denver	224.5
Nordic	Bruce Cunningham (2)	New Hampshire	7:07.7
Skimeister	Kim Kendall	New Hampshire	336.1
Slalom	Mike Porcarelli (2)	Colorado	1:25.71

== See also ==
- List of NCAA skiing programs
