= 1969 NCAA skiing championships =

American college skiing competition

Coordinates: 40.459°N 106.803°W

1969 NCAA Skiing Championships

Tournament information
- Sport: College skiing
- Location: Steamboat Springs, Colorado
- Dates: March 27–29, 1969
- Administrator: NCAA
- Venue(s): Mount Werner, Howelsen Hill (jumping)
- Teams: 12
- Number of events: 4 (7 titles)

Final positions
- Champions: Denver (12th title)
- 1st runners-up: Dartmouth
- 2nd runners-up: Fort Lewis

The 1969 NCAA Skiing Championships were contested at Mount Werner ski area near Steamboat Springs, Colorado at the 16th annual NCAA-sanctioned ski tournament to determine the individual and team national champions of men's collegiate alpine skiing, cross-country skiing, and ski jumping in the United States.

Denver, coached by Willy Schaeffler, captured their twelfth national championship and eighth in nine years (the Pioneers' previous streak of seven consecutive titles was interrupted by Wyoming in 1968). Denver finished 16.6 points ahead of runners-up Dartmouth in the team standings.

The sole repeat champion was Clark Matis of Colorado in cross country.

== Venue ==
This year's championships were held March 27–29 in Colorado at Mount Werner ski area in Steamboat Springs, with the jumping event at Howelsen Hill. The previous year's championships were held at the same sites.

The sixteenth edition, these were the fifth in Colorado, and the second at Steamboat Springs. Winter Park hosted the state's first two (1956, 1959), followed by Crested Butte in 1966.

Mount Werner was sold later this year and rebranded as "Steamboat" in 1970.

== Team scoring ==
Location in the United States

Rank	Team	Points
1st place, gold medalist(s)	Denver	388.6
2nd place, silver medalist(s)	Dartmouth	372.0
3rd place, bronze medalist(s)	Fort Lewis	367.5
4	Montana State	365.1
5	Colorado; Wyoming	360.6
7	Middlebury; Western State	359.4
9	Washington	352.1
10	Nevada–Reno	336.7
11	Harvard	325.8
12	Montana	320.6

== Individual events ==
Location in Colorado

Four events were held, which yielded seven individual titles.

- Thursday: Slalom
- Friday: Downhill, Cross Country
- Saturday: Jumping

Event	Champion		
Event	Skier	Team	Time/Score
Alpine	Paul Rachetto	Denver	3:25.3
Cross Country	Clark Matis (2)	Colorado	52:22
Downhill	Mike Lafferty	Colorado	1:31.41
Jumping	(Norway) Odd Hammernes	Denver	220.0
Nordic	Georg Krog	Denver	7:22.2
Skimeister	Ed Damon	Dartmouth	347.6
Slalom	Paul Rachetto	Denver	1:31.43

== See also ==
- List of NCAA skiing programs
