= 1974 NCAA Skiing Championships =

1974 US Skiing contest

Coordinates: 43.59°N 110.83°W

Tournament information
- Sport: College skiing
- Location: Teton Village, Wyoming
- Dates: March 7–9, 1974
- Administrator: NCAA
- Venue: Jackson Hole
- Teams: 15
- Number of events: 4 (6 titles)

Final positions
- Champions: Colorado (5th title)
- 1st runners-up: Wyoming
- 2nd runners-up: Vermont

The 1974 NCAA Skiing Championships were contested at the Jackson Hole Mountain Resort in Jackson Hole, Wyoming at the 21st annual NCAA-sanctioned ski tournament to determine the individual and team national champions of men's collegiate alpine skiing, cross-country skiing, and ski jumping in the United States.

Two-time defending champion Colorado, coached by alumnus Bill Marolt, captured their fifth national championship, finishing six points ahead of runner-up Wyoming in the team standings.

Repeat champions were Denver's Peik Christensen (alpine) and Steiner Hybertsen (cross country) of Wyoming.

== Venue ==
This year's NCAA championships were held March 7–9 in Wyoming at Jackson Hole. The 21st edition, these were the first in Wyoming.

== Team scoring ==
Location in the United States
Location in Wyoming

Rank	Team	Points
1st place, gold medalist(s)	Colorado	176
2nd place, silver medalist(s)	Wyoming	162
3rd place, bronze medalist(s)	Vermont	98
4	Dartmouth	89
5	Northern Michigan	78
6	Denver	62
7	Montana State	53
8	Middlebury	42
9	Weber State	32
10	New England College	31
11	Boise State	27
12	Utah	24
13	Fort Lewis	19
14	Nevada–Reno	14
15	Oregon	7

== Individual events ==
Four events were held, which yielded six individual titles.

- Thursday: Downhill, Cross Country
- Friday: Slalom
- Saturday: Jumping

Event	Champion		
Event	Skier	Team	Time/Score
Alpine	(Norway) Peik Christensen (2)	Denver	3:46.5
Cross Country	(Norway) Steiner Hybertsen (2)	Wyoming	57:58.3
Downhill	Larry Kennison	Wyoming	1:48.38
Jumping	(Norway) Didrik Ellefsen	Colorado	236.8
Nordic	(Norway) Stig Hallingbye	Wyoming	6:51.6
Slalom	Bill Shaw	Boise State	1:42.62

== See also ==
- List of NCAA skiing programs
