= 1973 NCAA Skiing Championships =

American college skiing competition

Coordinates: 43.939°N 72.958°W

Tournament information
- Sport: College skiing
- Location: Hancock, Vermont
- Dates: March 7–10, 1973
- Administrator: NCAA
- Host: Middlebury College
- Venue: Middlebury College Snow Bowl
- Teams: 14
- Number of events: 4 (7 titles)

Final positions
- Champions: Colorado (4th title)
- 1st runners-up: Wyoming
- 2nd runners-up: Vermont

The 1973 NCAA Skiing Championships were contested at the Middlebury College Snow Bowl in Hancock, Vermont at the twentieth annual NCAA-sanctioned ski tournament to determine the individual and team national champions of men's collegiate alpine skiing, cross-country skiing, and ski jumping in the United States.

Defending champion Colorado, coached by alumnus Bill Marolt, captured their fourth, and second consecutive, national championship, finishing 4.04 points ahead of Wyoming in the team standings.

These were the first NCAA championships in which Denver did not finish in either first (fourteen titles) or second (five times).

Repeat champions were Colorado's Vidar Nilsgard (jumping) and Kim Kendall (skimeister) of New Hampshire,

== Venue ==
This year's championships were held March 7–10 in Vermont at the Middlebury College Snow Bowl in Hancock. Middlebury College, located in nearby Middlebury, served as hosts.

The twentieth edition, these were the second NCAA championships hosted by Middlebury (1961), third in Vermont (Northfield, 1955), and seventh in the East, all in New England.

== Program changes ==
- This was the final year that skimeister was included in the event program. This award went to the skier with the best performance across all four disciplines.

== Team scoring ==
Location in the United States

Rank	Team	Points
1st place, gold medalist(s)	Colorado	381.89
2nd place, silver medalist(s)	Wyoming	377.83
3rd place, bronze medalist(s)	Vermont	376.85
4	Denver	372.55
5	Middlebury	362.38
6	Dartmouth	361.14
7	Fort Lewis	355.70
8	Northern Michigan	350.52
9	New Hampshire	345.78
10	Western State	341.05
11	Montana	335.23
12	Washington	187.20
13	Michigan Tech	178.37
14	Alaska Methodist	90.79

== Individual events ==
Location in Vermont

Four events were held, which yielded seven individual titles.

- Wednesday: Cross Country
- Thursday: Slalom
- Friday: Downhill
- Saturday: Jumping

Event	Champion		
Event	Skier	Team	Time/Score
Alpine	(Norway) Peik Christensen	Denver	3:35.06
Cross Country	(Norway) Steiner Hybertsen	Wyoming	53:41
Downhill	Bob Cochran	Vermont	1:46.94
Jumping	(Norway) Vidar Nilsgard (2)	Colorado	226.3
Nordic	(Finland) Pertti Reijula	Northern Michigan	6:31.7
Skimeister	Kim Kendall (2)	New Hampshire	336.45
Slalom	(Norway) Peik Christensen	Denver	1:20.31

== See also ==
- List of NCAA skiing programs
