= 1966 NCAA skiing championships =

American college skiing competition

Coordinates: 38.9°N 106.965°W

1966 NCAA Skiing Championships

Tournament information
- Sport: College skiing
- Location: Crested Butte, Colorado
- Dates: March 3–5, 1966
- Administrator: NCAA
- Venue: Crested Butte
- Teams: 9
- Number of events: 4 (7 titles)

Final positions
- Champions: Denver (10th title)
- 1st runners-up: Western State
- 2nd runners-up: Wyoming

The 1966 NCAA Skiing Championships were contested at the Crested Butte ski area in Created Butte, Colorado at the thirteenth annual NCAA-sanctioned ski tournament to determine the individual and team national champions of men's collegiate alpine skiing, cross-country skiing, and ski jumping in the United States.

Denver, coached by Willy Schaeffler, captured their tenth, and sixth consecutive, national championship, edging out locals Western State in the team standings. The Pioneers' sole individual win was by Terje Øverland in downhill.

Repeat individual champions were Mike Elliott of Fort Lewis in cross country, and Western State's Loris Werner (skimeister). Bill Marolt of Colorado won the slalom and alpine titles to add to his two previous in downhill (1963, 1965). Utah's Frithjof Prydz regained the jumping crown he won two years earlier and added the nordic.

== Venue ==
This year's championships were held March 3–5 in Colorado at Crested Butte, north of Gunnison.

The thirteenth edition, these were the third championships in Colorado and the first at Crested Butte; Winter Park hosted in 1956 and 1959.

== Team scoring ==
Location in the United States

Rank	Team	Points
1st place, gold medalist(s)	Denver	381.02
2nd place, silver medalist(s)	Western State	365.92
3rd place, bronze medalist(s)	Wyoming	359.22
4	Washington	357.88
5	Utah	355.04
6	Montana State	291.63
7	Nevada–Reno	168.84
8	Michigan Tech	150.86
9	Michigan State	115.66

== Individual events ==
Location in Colorado

Four events were held, which yielded seven individual titles.

- Thursday: Slalom
- Friday: Cross Country
- Saturday: Downhill, Jumping

Event	Champion		
Event	Skier	Team	Time/Score
Alpine	Bill Marolt	Colorado	3:16.2
Cross Country	Mike Elliott (2)	Fort Lewis	53:19
Downhill	(Norway) Terje Øverland	Denver	1:52.50
Jumping	(Norway) Frithjof Prydz (2)	Utah	225.3
Nordic	(Norway) Frithjof Prydz	Utah	7:09.4
Skimeister	Loris Werner (2)	Western State	361.47
Slalom	Bill Marolt	Colorado	1:38.21

== See also ==
- List of NCAA skiing programs
