= 1983 NCAA Skiing Championships =

American college skiing competition

Tournament information
- Sport: College skiing
- Location: Bozeman, Montana
- Administrator: NCAA
- Venue(s): Bridger Bowl Ski Area
- Teams: 18

Final positions
- Champions: Utah (2nd title)
- 1st runners-up: Vermont
- 2nd runners-up: Wyoming

The 1983 NCAA Skiing Championships were contested at the Bridger Bowl Ski Area in Bozeman, Montana as part of the 30th annual NCAA-sanctioned ski tournament to determine the individual and team national champions of men's and women's collegiate slalom skiing and cross-country skiing in the United States.

These were the first championships with teams composed of both men's and women's skiers.

Utah, coached by Phil Miller, claimed their second team national championship, 46 points ahead of Vermont in the cumulative team standings.

== Venue ==
Championships site

This year's NCAA skiing championships were hosted at the Bridger Bowl Ski Area near Bozeman, Montana.

These were the second championships held in the state of Montana (1960 and 1983).

== Program ==
Four new events were added this year:

- Women's slalom
- Women's giant slalom
- Women's cross country
- Women's cross country relay

== Team scoring ==
| Rank | Team | Points |
|---|---|---|
| 1st place, gold medalist(s) | Utah | 696 |
| 2nd place, silver medalist(s) | Vermont | 650 |
| 3rd place, bronze medalist(s) | Wyoming | 629.5 |
| 4 | Colorado | 539 |
| 5 | Middlebury | 468 |
| 6 | New Mexico | 446 |
| 7 | Dartmouth | 348 |
| 8 | Montana State | 329.5 |
| 9 | New Hampshire | 259 |
| 10 | Williams | 215.5 |
| 11 | Alaska–Anchorage | 172 |
| 12 | St. Lawrence | 138 |
| 13 | Denver | 90 |
| 14 | Alaska–Fairbanks | 77 |
| 15 | New England College | 51.5 |
| 16 | Nevada–Reno | 39 |
| 17 | Bates | 5 |
| 18 | Saint Michael's | 3 |

== See also ==
- List of NCAA skiing programs
