= 1985 NCAA Skiing Championships =

American college skiing competition

Tournament information
- Sport: College skiing
- Location: Bozeman, Montana
- Administrator: NCAA
- Venue(s): Bridger Bowl Ski Area
- Teams: 18

Final positions
- Champions: Wyoming (2nd title)
- 1st runners-up: Utah
- 2nd runners-up: Vermont

The 1985 NCAA Skiing Championships were contested at the Bridger Bowl Ski Area in Bozeman, Montana as part of the 32nd annual NCAA-sanctioned ski tournament to determine the individual and team national champions of men's and women's collegiate slalom skiing and cross-country skiing in the United States.

Wyoming, coached by Tim Ameel, claimed their second team national championship, 20 points ahead of Utah in the cumulative team standings.

== Venue ==
Championships site

This year's NCAA skiing championships were hosted at the Bridger Bowl Ski Area near Bozeman, Montana.

These were the third championships held in the state of Montana (1960, 1983, and 1985).

== Team scoring ==
Rank	Team	Points
1st place, gold medalist(s)	Wyoming	764
2nd place, silver medalist(s)	Utah	744
3rd place, bronze medalist(s)	Vermont	721
4	Dartmouth	599
5	Colorado	595
6	New Mexico	591
7	New Hampshire	368
8	Alaska Anchorage	360
9	Montana State	354
10	Middlebury	321
11	Williams	173
12	Alaska Fairbanks	116
13	Western State	108
14	St. Lawrence	62
15	New England College	54
16	Bates	49
17	Nevada–Reno	17
18	Cornell	13

== See also ==
- List of NCAA skiing programs
