= 1976 NCAA Skiing Championships =

American college skiing competition

Coordinates: 44.473°N 70.858°W

Tournament information
- Sport: College skiing
- Location: Newry, Maine
- Dates: March 3–6, 1976
- Administrator: NCAA
- Host: Bates College
- Venue: Sunday River
- Teams: 8
- Number of events: 4 (6 titles)

Final positions
- Champions: Colorado (7th title); Dartmouth (2nd title)
- Runner-up: Vermont (3rd place)

The 1976 NCAA Skiing Championships were contested at Sunday River ski area, near the town of Newry, Maine, at the 23rd annual NCAA-sanctioned ski tournament to determine the individual and team national champions of men's collegiate alpine, cross country skiing, and ski jumping in the United States.

Four-time defending champion Colorado, coached by alumnus Bill Marolt, finished tied with Dartmouth, coached by Jim Page, atop the team standings, with 112 points each, and shared the team national championship. Both teams finished a mere four points ahead of third-place Vermont, a point ahead of Wyoming; this was the seventh title for the Buffaloes and the second for the Big Green.

== Venue ==
This year's championships were held March 3–6 in Maine at Sunday River ski area in the town of Newry. Bates College of Lewiston served as host.

These were the second NCAA championships in Maine (1967, Sugarloaf) and eighth in the East, all in New England.

== Team scoring ==
Location in the United States

Rank	Team	Points
1st place, gold medalist(s)	Colorado; Dartmouth	112
3rd place, bronze medalist(s)	Vermont	108
4	Wyoming	107
5	Utah	64
6	Middlebury	52
7	Northern Michigan	49
8	Nevada–Reno	8

== Individual events ==
Location in Maine

Four events were held, which yielded six individual titles.

- Wednesday: Giant Slalom
- Thursday: Cross Country
- Friday: Slalom
- Saturday: Jumping

Event	Champion		
Event	Skier	Team	Time/Score
Alpine	Mike Meleski	Wyoming	5:47.7
Cross Country	Stan Dunklee	Vermont	42:11.7
Giant Slalom	Dave Cleveland	Dartmouth	2:56.96
Jumping	Kip Sundgaard	Utah	215.9
Nordic	Jack Turner	Colorado	6:20.3
Slalom	Mike Meleski	Wyoming	1:34.74

== See also ==
- List of NCAA skiing programs
