= 1996 NCAA Skiing Championships =

American college skiing competition

Tournament information
- Sport: College skiing
- Location: Bozeman, Montana
- Administrator: NCAA
- Venue(s): Bridger Bowl Ski Area
- Teams: 23
- Number of events: 8

Final positions
- Champions: Utah (8th overall, 7th co-ed)
- 1st runners-up: Denver
- 2nd runners-up: Vermont

The 1996 NCAA Skiing Championships were contested at the Bridger Bowl Ski Area in Bozeman, Montana as part of the 43rd annual NCAA-sanctioned ski tournament to determine the individual and team national champions of men's and women's collegiate slalom and cross-country skiing in the United States.

Utah, coached by Pat Miller, won the team championship, the Utes' eighth title overall and seventh as a co-ed team.

== Venue ==
This year's NCAA skiing championships were hosted at the Bridger Bowl Ski Area near Bozeman, Montana.

These were the fourth championships held in the state of Montana (1960, 1983, 1985, and 1996).

== Program ==
=== Men's events ===
- Cross country, 20 kilometer classical
- Cross country, 10 kilometer freestyle
- Slalom
- Giant slalom

=== Women's events ===
- Cross country, 15 kilometer classical
- Cross country, 5 kilometer freestyle
- Slalom
- Giant slalom

== Team scoring ==
Championships site

| Rank | Team | Points |
|---|---|---|
| 1st place, gold medalist(s) | Utah | 719 |
| 2nd place, silver medalist(s) | Denver | 635 1/2 |
| 3rd place, bronze medalist(s) | Vermont | 615 |
| 4 | Colorado (DC) | 602 1/2 |
| 5 | Western State | 505 |
| 6 | Middlebury | 450 |
| 7 | Alaska Anchorage | 435 |
| 8 | Dartmouth | 433 |
| 9 | New Mexico | 413 |
| 10 | New Hampshire | 317 |
| 11 | Northern Michigan | 251 |
| 12 | Nevada | 206 |
| 13 | Williams | 158 |
| 14 | Bates | 130 |
| 15 | Wisconsin–Green Bay | 62 |
| 16 | Montana State | 49 |
| 17 | Alaska Fairbanks | 46 |
| 18 | Saint Michael's | 42 |
| 19 | St. Olaf | 34 |
| 20 | Bowdoin | 29 |
| 21 | Massachusetts | 24 |
| 22 | Carleton | 14 |
| 23 | St. Lawrence | 8 |

- DC – Defending champions
- Debut team appearance

== See also ==
- List of NCAA skiing programs
