= 1963 NCAA skiing championships =

1963 skiing championship in Utah

Coordinates: 40.619°N 111.594°W

1963 NCAA Skiing Championships

Tournament information
- Sport: College skiing
- Location: Big Cottonwood Canyon, Utah
- Dates: March 21–23, 1963
- Administrator: NCAA
- Host: Utah
- Venue: Solitude Ski Resort
- Teams: 6
- Number of events: 4 (7 titles)

Final positions
- Champions: Denver (7th title)
- 1st runners-up: Colorado
- 2nd runners-up: Dartmouth

The 1963 NCAA Skiing Championships were contested at the Solitude Ski Resort in Big Cottonwood Canyon, Utah at the tenth annual NCAA-sanctioned ski tournament to determine the individual and team national champions of men's collegiate alpine skiing, cross-country skiing, and ski jumping in the United States.

Denver, coached by Willy Schaeffler, captured their seventh, and third consecutive, national championship, again edging out rival Colorado in the team standings.

Jim Page of Dartmouth repeated as Skimeister (all four events). The downhill competition on Friday was a three-way tie, won by Dave Gorsuch of Western State and Colorado's Bill Marolt and Buddy Werner, who reclaimed the alpine combined title he won two years earlier. Future Olympic bronze medalist Jimmie Heuga of Colorado won Thursday's slalom, passing teammates Marolt and Werner in the second run.

== Venue ==
This year's championships were held March 21–23 in Utah at Solitude in Big Cottonwood Canyon, southeast of Salt Lake City. The tenth edition, these were the second in Utah and the Wasatch Range; Snow Basin (on Mount Ogden) hosted six years earlier in 1957.

== Team scoring ==
Location in the United States

Rank	Team	Points
1st place, gold medalist(s)	Denver	384.6
2nd place, silver medalist(s)	Colorado	381.6
3rd place, bronze medalist(s)	Dartmouth	348.9
4	Western State	336.4
5	Notre Dame	190.6
6	Chico State	155.0

== Individual events ==
Location in Utah

Four events were held, which yielded seven individual titles.

- Thursday: Slalom
- Friday: Downhill, Cross Country
- Saturday: Jumping

Event	Champion		
Event	Skier	Team	Time/Score
Alpine	Buddy Werner (2)	Colorado	3:42.6
Cross Country	Eddie Demers	Western State	66:51
Downhill	Dave Gorsuch; Bill Marolt; Buddy Werner	Western State; Colorado; Colorado	1:50.0
Jumping	(Norway) Ole Tom Nord	Washington	237.35
Nordic	(Finland) Aarne Valkama	Denver	7:48.42
Skimeister	Jim Page (2)	Dartmouth	336.0
Slalom	Jimmie Heuga	Colorado	1:42.0

== See also ==
- List of NCAA skiing programs
