= 1978 NCAA Skiing Championships =

Skiing contest in New Hampshire, US

Tournament information
- Sport: College skiing
- Location: Franconia, New Hampshire
- Administrator: NCAA
- Venue(s): Cannon Mountain Ski Area
- Teams: 14

Final positions
- Champions: Colorado (9th title)
- 1st runners-up: Wyoming
- 2nd runners-up: Dartmouth

The 1978 NCAA Skiing Championships were contested at the Cannon Mountain Ski Area in Franconia, New Hampshire, at the 25th annual NCAA-sanctioned ski tournament to determine the individual and team national champions of men's collegiate alpine skiing, cross-country skiing, and ski jumping in the United States.

Six-time defending champions Colorado, coached by Bill Marolt, once again claimed the team national championship, finishing 31 points ahead of Wyoming in the standings. This was the ninth title for the Buffaloes.

== Venue ==
1978 NCAA Skiing Championships site

This year's NCAA skiing championships were contested at the Cannon Mountain Ski Area at Cannon Mountain in Franconia, New Hampshire.

These were the fourth championships held in the state of New Hampshire (1958, 1964, 1970, and 1978) and the third at Cannon Mountain (1964, 1970, and 1978).

== Team scoring ==
| Rank | Team | Points |
|---|---|---|
| 1st place, gold medalist(s) | Colorado | 152.5 |
| 2nd place, silver medalist(s) | Wyoming | 121.5 |
| 3rd place, bronze medalist(s) | Vermont | 114 |
| 4 | Dartmouth | 113.5 |
| 5 | Utah | 109.5 |
| 6 | Northern Michigan | 56 |
| 7 | Middlebury | 53 |
| 8 | New Hampshire | 25 |
| 9 | Montana State | 20 |
| 10 | Williams | 13 |
| 11 | Alaska–Fairbanks | 10 |
| 12 | Nevada | 9 |
| 13 | Montana | 8 |
| 14 | Bates | 5 |

== See also ==
- List of NCAA skiing programs
