= 1998 NCAA Skiing Championships =

American college skiing competition

Tournament information
- Sport: College skiing
- Location: Bozeman, Montana
- Administrator: NCAA
- Venue(s): Bridger Bowl Ski Area
- Teams: 22
- Number of events: 8

Final positions
- Champions: Colorado (14th overall, 3rd co-ed)
- 1st runners-up: Utah
- 2nd runners-up: Denver

The 1998 NCAA Skiing Championships were contested at the Bridger Bowl Ski Area in Bozeman, Montana as part of the 45th annual NCAA-sanctioned ski tournament to determine the individual and team national champions of men's and women's collegiate slalom and cross-country skiing in the United States.

Colorado, coached by Richard Rokos, won the team championship, the Buffaloes' fourteenth title overall and third as a co-ed team.

== Venue ==
This year's NCAA skiing championships were hosted at the Bridger Bowl Ski Area near Bozeman, Montana.

These were the fifth championships held in the state of Montana (1960, 1983, 1985, 1996, and 1998).

== Program ==
=== Men's events ===
- Cross country, 20 kilometer freestyle
- Cross country, 10 kilometer classical
- Slalom
- Giant slalom

=== Women's events ===
- Cross country, 15 kilometer freestyle
- Cross country, 5 kilometer classical
- Slalom
- Giant slalom

== Team scoring ==
Championships site

Rank	Team	Points
1st place, gold medalist(s)	Colorado	654
2nd place, silver medalist(s)	Utah (DC)	651 1/2
3rd place, bronze medalist(s)	Denver	638
4	Vermont	556
5	Alaska Anchorage	524
6	New Mexico	513
7	Dartmouth	505
8	Middlebury	481
9	Bates	205
10	New Hampshire	199
11	Nevada	193
12	Western State	187
13	Northern Michigan	170
14	Wisconsin–Green Bay	154
15	St. Lawrence	128
16	Williams	103
17	Montana State	45
18	Saint Michael's	38
19	Colby	24
20	Alaska Fairbanks	15
21	Colby–Sawyer	9
22	St. Olaf	8

- DC – Defending champions
- Debut team appearance

== See also ==
- List of NCAA skiing programs
