= 2021 NCAA Skiing Championships =

American college skiing competition

2021 NCAA Skiing tournament
- Teams: 17
- Format: Duration scoring
- Finals site: Franconia and Jackson, New Hampshire
- Champions: Utah Utes (13th title)
- Runner-up: Colorado Buffaloes
- Semifinalists: Denver Pioneers; Alaska Anchorage Seawolves
- Television: NCAA

The 2021 NCAA Skiing Championships took place from March 10 to March 13 in New Hampshire, at Jackson Nordic Ski Area, which hosted the cross-country events, and Cannon Mountain Ski Area, which hosted the alpine events. The tournament went into its 67th consecutive NCAA Skiing Championships, and featured seventeen teams across all divisions.

== Team results ==
- Note: Top 10 only
- (H): Team from hosting U.S. state

Rank	Team	Points
1st place, gold medalist(s)	Utah	554
2nd place, silver medalist(s)	Colorado	522.5
3rd place, bronze medalist(s)	Denver	442
4	Alaska Anchorage	411
5	Montana State	383.5
6	Vermont	351
7	Northern Michigan	232
8	Westminster	212
9	New Hampshire	211
10	Alaska Fairbanks	163

== Individual Results ==
- Note: Table does not include consolation
- (H): Individual from hosting U.S. State

Games	First	Second	Third
Women's giant slalom details	Cassidy Gray; Colorado	Stef Fleckenstein; Colorado	Francesca English; Vermont
Women's giant slalom details	Cassidy Gray; Colorado	Stef Fleckenstein; Colorado	Julia Toiviainen (Utah) Westminster
Women's 5K classical details	Sydney Palmer-Leger; Utah	Julia Richter; Utah	Novie McCabe; Utah
Women's 5K classical details	Sydney Palmer-Leger; Utah	Julia Richter; Utah	Astird Stav; Alaska Anchorage
Women's slalom details	Amelia Smart (Colorado) Denver	Justine Clement; Vermont	Julia Toiviainen (Utah) Westminster
Women's slalom details	Amelia Smart (Colorado) Denver	Justine Clement; Vermont	Stef Fleckenstein; Colorado
Women's 15K freestyle details	Sydney Palmer-Leger; Utah	Astird Stav; Alaska Anchorage	Novie McCabe; Utah
Women's 15K freestyle details	Sydney Palmer-Leger; Utah	Astird Stav; Alaska Anchorage	Tuva Bygrave; Alaska Anchorage
Men's giant slalom details	Mikkel Solbakken (Utah) Westminster	Tobias Kogler (Colorado) Denver	Gustavo Vollo; Utah
Men's giant slalom details	Mikkel Solbakken (Utah) Westminster	Tobias Kogler (Colorado) Denver	Age Solheim; Montana State
Men's 10K classical details	Magnus Boee; Colorado	Luke Jager; Utah	Samuel Hendry; Utah
Men's 10K classical details	Magnus Boee; Colorado	Luke Jager; Utah	Espen Persen; Alaska Anchorage
Men's slalom details	Mathias Tefre; Vermont	Filip Forejtek; Colorado	Simon Fournier (Colorado) Denver
Men's slalom details	Mathias Tefre; Vermont	Filip Forejtek; Colorado	Joachim Lien; Utah
Men's 20K freestyle details	Magnus Boee; Colorado	Samuel Hendry; Utah	Kjetil Baanerud; Northern Michigan
Men's 20K freestyle details	Magnus Boee; Colorado	Samuel Hendry; Utah	Zak Ketterson; Northern Michigan
