= Louis Muhlen-Schulte =

Australian alpine skier (born 1998)

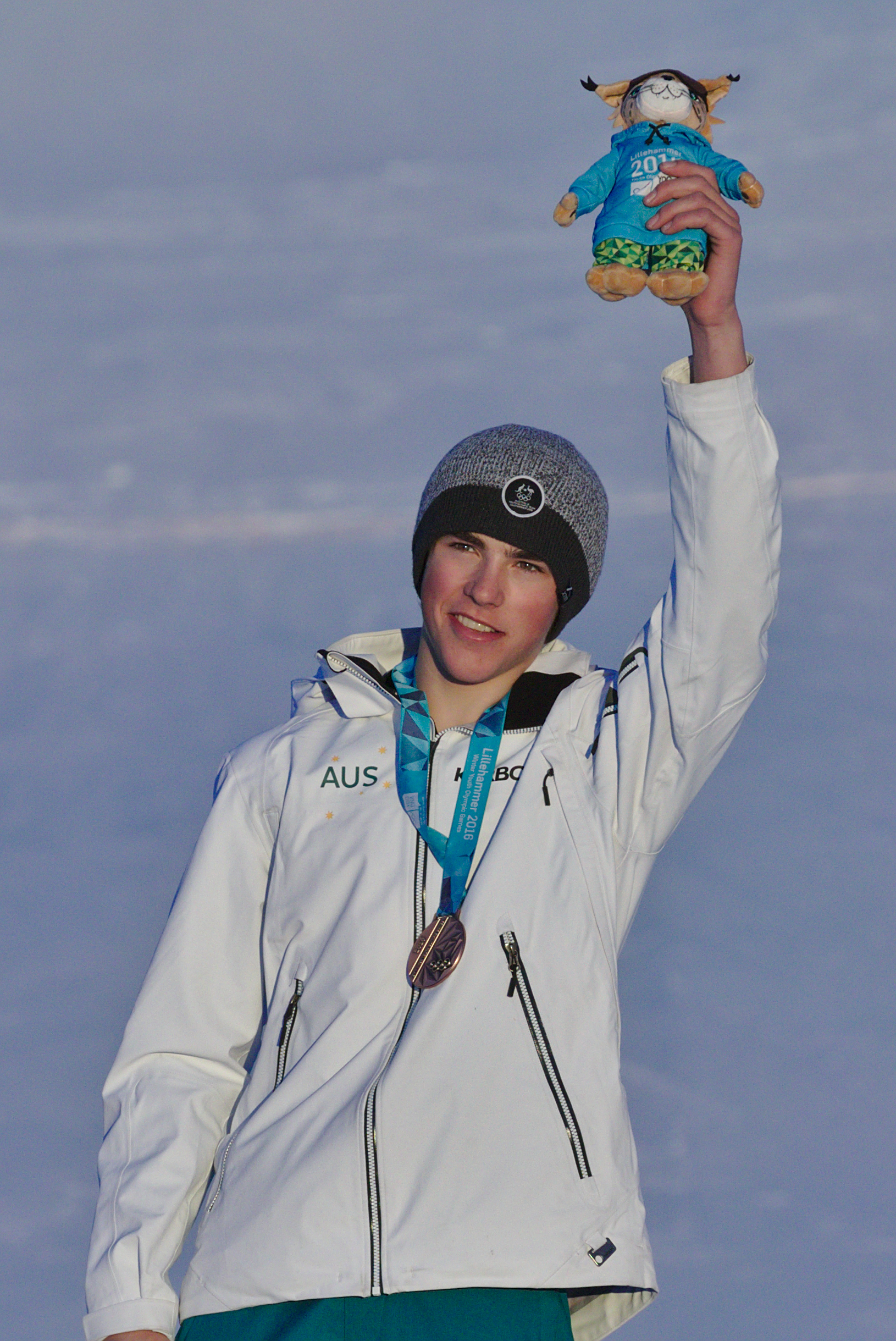
- Louis Mulhen after the ski cross event at the 2016 Youth Olympic Games

Personal information
- Full name: Louis Muhlen-Schulte
- Nationality: Australian
- Born: 12 March 1998 (age 28) Victoria, Australia
- Occupation: Alpine Skier

Louis Muhlen-Schulte (born 12 March 1998) is an Olympian alpine skier, from Victoria, Australia.

== Professional career ==
Louis has been an Australian National Alpine Ski team member since 2015.

Louis attended Sugar Bowl Academy from 2014 to 2017.

Louis competed for Montana State University from 2018 to 2021.

He finished fifth in the slalom at the 2021 National Collegiate Athletic Association (NCAA) championships, earning him his first team All-America honors. As a junior, he finished fifth in the alpine combined at the world championships, in 2019 at Val di Fosso.

Louis competed at the 2016 Winter Youth Olympics in Lillehammer, Norway, winning bronze in the Ski Cross on Day 4.

His Olympic debut, the XXIV Winter Olympic Games in Beijing 2022, saw him finish 23rd in the men's giant slalom. However, in his debut at competing in the men's slalom, he did not finish his opening run and was eliminated from the race.

Louis competed in Europe in the 2021–2022 Ski season.

== Awards ==
- Travis Lulay Bobcat of the Year Award
- Rising Leader Award 2019-2021
- Australian Alpine athlete of the year 2021
