= Peik Christensen =

Norwegian alpine skier (born 1952)

Alfred Peik Christensen (born 14 May 1952) is a Norwegian alpine ski racer. Born in Oslo, he competed at the 1972 Winter Olympics in Sapporo, Japan, in all three alpine events: slalom, giant slalom, and downhill.

Christensen was the Norwegian champion in giant slalom at age seventeen in 1970 and again in 1972. While racing for the University of Denver, he won four individual NCAA titles, in slalom (1973, 1975) and alpine combined (1973, 1974).

== Olympic results ==
Year	Age	Slalom	Giant Slalom	Super-G	Downhill	Combined
1972	19	DQ1	23	not run	36	not run
