= Bridger Bowl Ski Area =

Ski area in Montana, United States

Bridger Bowl
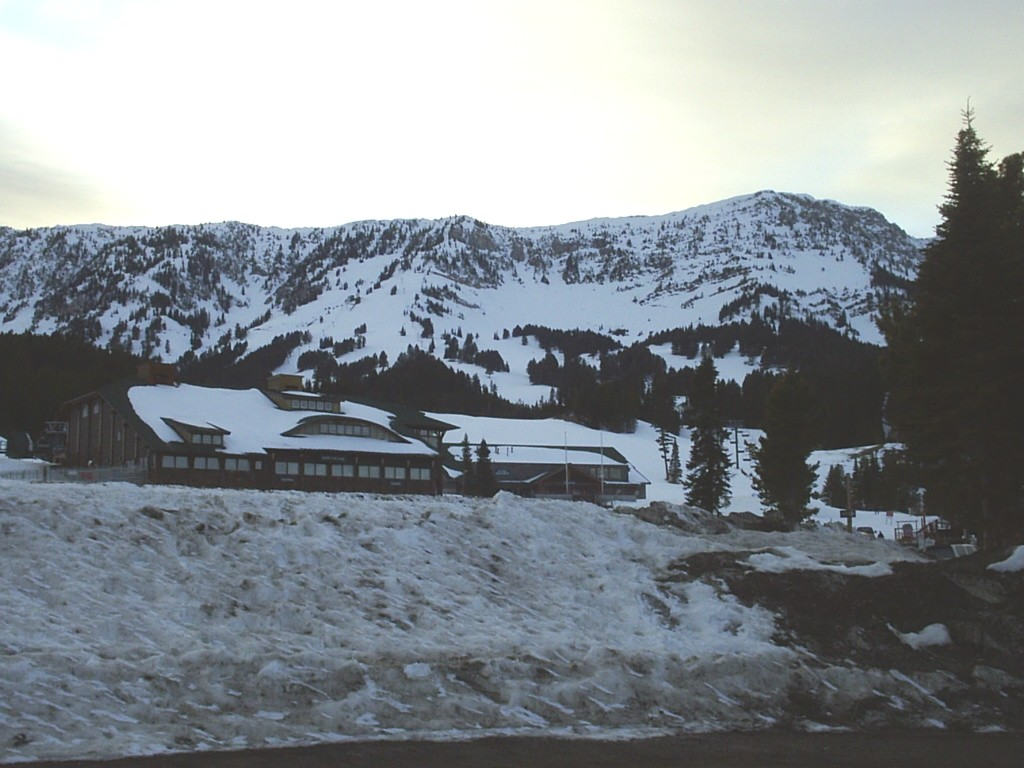
- Base area in March 2005

- Location in Montana Location in the United States
- Location: Gallatin National Forest; Gallatin County, Montana; United States
- Nearest city: Bozeman: 16 miles (26 km)
- Coordinates: 45.818°N 110.897°W
- Vertical: 2,600 feet (790 m)
- Top elevation: 8,700 feet (2,650 m)
- Base elevation: 6,100 feet (1,860 m)
- Skiable area: 2,000 acres (8.1 km^{2})
- Trails: 75
- Longest run: 3 miles (5 km)
- Lift system: 8 chairlifts: 1 Quad; 6 Triples; 1 Double
- Snowfall: 350 in (29.2 ft; 8.9 m)
- Snowmaking: minimal
- Website: bridgerbowl.com

Bridger Bowl is an alpine ski area in the western United States, near Bozeman, Montana. It serves the local population of Gallatin County, including Montana State University. The summit elevation is 8,700 feet (2,650 m) above sea level, with a vertical drop of 2,600 feet (790 m) on east-facing slopes.

Located sixteen miles (26 km) north of Bozeman in the Bridger Range of southern Montana, Bridger Bowl is a locally owned non-profit ski area. It provides locals with affordable skiing, great terrain, and outstanding snowfall. The ski area and mountain range are named after the noted mountain man Jim Bridger, and are accessed from state highway 86.

In addition to the existing base lodge and a mid-mountain lodge, a new main lodge opened in 2005 at the base area.

Since 1988, local residents have been alerted to the arrival of fresh snow by a flashing blue beacon atop the Baxter Hotel in downtown Bozeman. Activated every time Bridger Bowl accumulates two inches (5 cm) of new snow, it remains on for 24 hours. Maintenance of the light is a priority, and only once in 20 years was it out of operation for two days.

Bridger Bowl opened the new Schlasman's chairlift for the 2008–09 season, the first lift-served terrain expansion in 30 years. A reconditioned 1976 Doppelmayr double chair, it was previously the "Peruvian" lift at Snowbird in Utah. Named after a miner who died in an avalanche in 1885, Schlasman's has a vertical rise of 1,700 feet (518 m) and adds 311 acres (1.26 km^{2}) of new lift-served terrain for expert skiers only. To ride this lift, skiers are required to carry an avalanche transceiver. It is highly recommended to travel with partners, carry a shovel and probe, and have the knowledge of how to perform an avalanche rescue.

For the 2013–14 season, Bridger unveiled its new Powder Park and Alpine chair lifts. These brand-new lifts tripled the uphill capacity (3,300 vs. 1,100/hr) compared to the "old Alpine" center-pole double chair that was retired in 2013.

In February 2025, Bridger Bowl released its updated Master Development plan outlining significant upgrades to accommodate growing visitation, which reached a record 377,663 skiers in the 22-23 season. The plan proposes six new lifts, including expansion into "Bradley Meadows", a new beginner area, and 70 additional acres of developed terrain. Additionally night skiing, expanded snowmaking, and improvements to lodges have been proposed all requiring Forest Service approval through NEPA before implementation.

Bridger Bowl is noted for its expert-only skiing terrain known as "The Ridge." There are six sections of the ridge known as Schlasman's, D Route, C Route, B Route, A route, and Northwest/Hidden Gully Areas. In order to ski or snowboard the ridge, an avalanche beacon and shovel are required; most of the ridge is hiking terrain.

Montana State has hosted the NCAA Skiing Championships eight times (1960, 1983, 1985, 1996, 1998, 2008, 2012, 2020), all at Bridger Bowl, with cross-country events at adjacent Crosscut Mountain Sports Center.

Since 1991 the ridge at Bridger Bowl has been the site of a raptor migration count supported by Sacajawea Audubon Society. Bridger Raptor Fest is hosted on a weekend during this count to promote raptor education and conservation.

== List of runs ==
Difficulty ratings

Green	Blue	Black Diamond	Double Black Diamond
Sunnyside	Timmy's Road	Buck's Run	Flippers
Glenn's Glade	White Lightning	Devil's Dive	Zits
Moose Meadows	Boot Hill	Southbound	High Traverse
Coyote Flats	Elk Run	Three Bears Bowl	The Nose
Sawmill Gulch	Upper Sawmill Gulch	Avalanche Gulch	Exit Chute
Summer Road	Good Clean Fun	Bronco	Tight Squeeze
Mully Road	Bobcat	Brush Run	Out of Sight
Mogul Mouse	Wolverine	The John	DRCS
Chalet Road	Maverick	Sluice Box	
Lower Limestone	Cross Cut	Freedom	
Limestone	Crazy Woman	Easy Money	
Alpine Run	Alpine Return	Ptarmigan	
Rugrat	Deer Park Road	Deer Park Face	
Alpine Access	Alpine Face	North Bowl Road	
Porcupine	Three Bears Traverse	Powder Hog	
Montagne's Meadow	Thunder Road	North Bowl Run	
	Powder Park	Last Chance	
	Sacajawea	Mayo's	
	Powder Horn	Kurt's	
	Bitterroot	Emigrant	
	Bridger Run		
Pierre's Return
Pierre's Road
Southern Drawl
Missouri Breaks
Colter's
Hanton's Hollow
Emil's Mile
Powder Puff
