= Rocky Mountain Intercollegiate Ski Association =

NCAA skiing conference

The Rocky Mountain Intercollegiate Ski Association (RMISA) is a National Collegiate Athletic Association (NCAA) skiing-only conference. As the NCAA does not have divisions in collegiate skiing, it is composed of both NCAA Division I and NCAA Division II schools. The RMISA was founded in 1950 and was largely responsible for the creation of skiing as an NCAA sport in 1954. From 1950 to 1976 it was men's skiing, from 1977 to 1982 the RMISA sponsored both men's and women's skiing separately. In 1983, the NCAA incorporated women's skiing (it was an AIAW sport from 1977 to 1982) and made it a Coed sport and the RMISA did the same.

The RMISA has won 56 of 68 skiing national championships since 1950, including 53 of 63 NCAA Championships that have been awarded and 29 of the 34 NCAA Championships since skiing went coed in 1983. Denver, Colorado and Utah are first, second and third on the list for most skiing national championships. Denver has won 25, including 23 NCAA, while Colorado has 20 (19 NCAA) and Utah 11 (10 NCAA).

== Current members ==
The RMISA is currently made up of nine members, seven with NCAA affiliated ski teams and four associate members. The associate members can compete in regular season competition and at the RMISA Championships but cannot qualify for the NCAA Skiing Championships.

Full Members:

- Alaska Anchorage Seawolves
- Alaska Nanooks — Joined in 2016–17
- California Golden Bears
- Colorado Buffaloes
- Denver Pioneers
- Montana State Bobcats
- Nevada Wolf Pack
- Utah Utes
- Westminster Griffins

Associate Members:

- Colorado Mountain College
- Wyoming Cowboys and Cowgirls

== Former members ==
- Boise State Broncos, dropped varsity skiing in 2007
- Colorado College Tigers, charter member in 1950, unclear when dropped
- Colorado Mines Orediggers, charter member in 1950, unclear when dropped
- Colorado State Rams, charter member in 1950, unclear when dropped
- New Mexico Lobos, dropped varsity skiing in 2019
- Utah State Aggies, charter member in 1950, unclear when dropped
- Western State Colorado Mountaineers, dropped varsity skiing in 2008
- Whitman College, dropped varsity skiing in 2008
- Wyoming Cowboys and Cowgirls, dropped varsity skiing in 1992 (Wyoming's current RMISA team is its club skiing team)

== RMISA Champions ==
MEN			WOMEN			COED
Season	Champion	Runner up	Season	Champion	Runner up	Season	Champion	Runner up
1950	Denver	Western State	1977	Utah	Wyoming	1983	Wyoming	Utah
1951	Denver	Utah	1978	Colorado	Utah	1984	Utah	Colorado
1952	Denver	Utah	1979	Colorado	Utah	1985	Utah	Colorado
1953	Western State	Denver	1980	Wyoming	Colorado	1986	Colorado	Utah
1954	Denver	Utah	1981	Utah	Colorado	1987	Utah	Wyoming
1955	Denver	Colorado	1982	Wyoming	Colorado	1988	Utah	Colorado
1956	Denver	Idaho				1989	Utah	Wyoming
1957	Denver	Colorado				1990	Utah	Colorado
1958	Denver	Colorado				1991	Colorado	Utah
1959	Colorado	Denver				1992	New Mexico	Utah
1960	Colorado	Denver				1993	Colorado	Utah
1961	Denver	Colorado				1994	Colorado	Utah
1962	Colorado	Denver				1995	Colorado	Utah
1963	Colorado	Denver				1996	Utah	Colorado
1964	Western State	Denver				1997	Utah	Colorado
1965	Denver	Utah				1998	Utah	Colorado
1966	Denver	Utah				1999	Colorado	Denver
1967	Denver	Wyoming				2000	Colorado	Denver
1968	Wyoming	Denver				2001	Denver	Colorado
1969	Colorado	Denver				2002	Colorado	Utah
1970	Denver	Colorado				2003	Utah	Colorado
1971	Denver	Colorado				2004	Denver	New Mexico
1972	Colorado	Denver				2005	Denver	New Mexico
1973	Colorado	Denver				2006	Colorado	New Mexico
1974	Colorado	Denver				2007	Denver	Colorado
1975	Colorado	Utah				2008	Colorado	Utah
1976	Colorado	Wyoming				2009	New Mexico	Colorado
1977	Wyoming	Colorado				2010	Colorado	Alaska Anchorage
1978	Wyoming	Colorado				2011	Colorado	Utah
1979	Colorado	Utah				2012	Utah	Colorado
1980	Utah	Colorado				2013	Colorado	Utah
1981	Utah	Colorado				2014	Utah	Colorado
1982	Utah	Colorado				2015	Colorado	Utah
						2016	Utah	Colorado

Championships By School

Overall
Colorado 27 (1959-60-62-63-69-72-73-74-75-76-79 Men; 1978-79 Women; 1986-91-93-94-95-99-2000-02-06-08-10-11-13-15 Coed)
Denver 18 (1950-51-52-54-55-56-57-58-61-65-66-67-70-71 Men; 2001-04-05-07 Coed)
Utah 17 (1977-81 Women; 1980-81-82 Men; 1984-85-87-88-89-90-96-97-98-2003-12-14-16 Coed)
Wyoming 6 (1968-77-78 Men; 1980-82 Women; 1983 Coed)
New Mexico 2 (1992-2009 Coed)
Western State 2 (1953-64 Men)
Men's
Denver 14 (1950-51-52-54-55-56-57-58-61-65-66-67-70-71)
Colorado 11 (1959-60-62-63-69-72-73-74-75-76-79)
Utah 3 (1980-81-82)
Wyoming 3 (1968-77-78)
Western State 2 (1953-64)
Women's
Colorado 2 (1978-79)
Utah 2 (1977-81)
Wyoming 2 (1980-82)
Coed
Colorado 14 (1986-91-93-94-95-99-2000-02-06-08-10-11-13-15)
Utah 13 (1984-85-87-88-89-90-96-97-98-2003-12-14-16)
Denver 4 (2001-04-05-07)
New Mexico 2 (1992-2009)
Wyoming 1 (1983)
