= Otto Tschudi =

Norwegian alpine skier

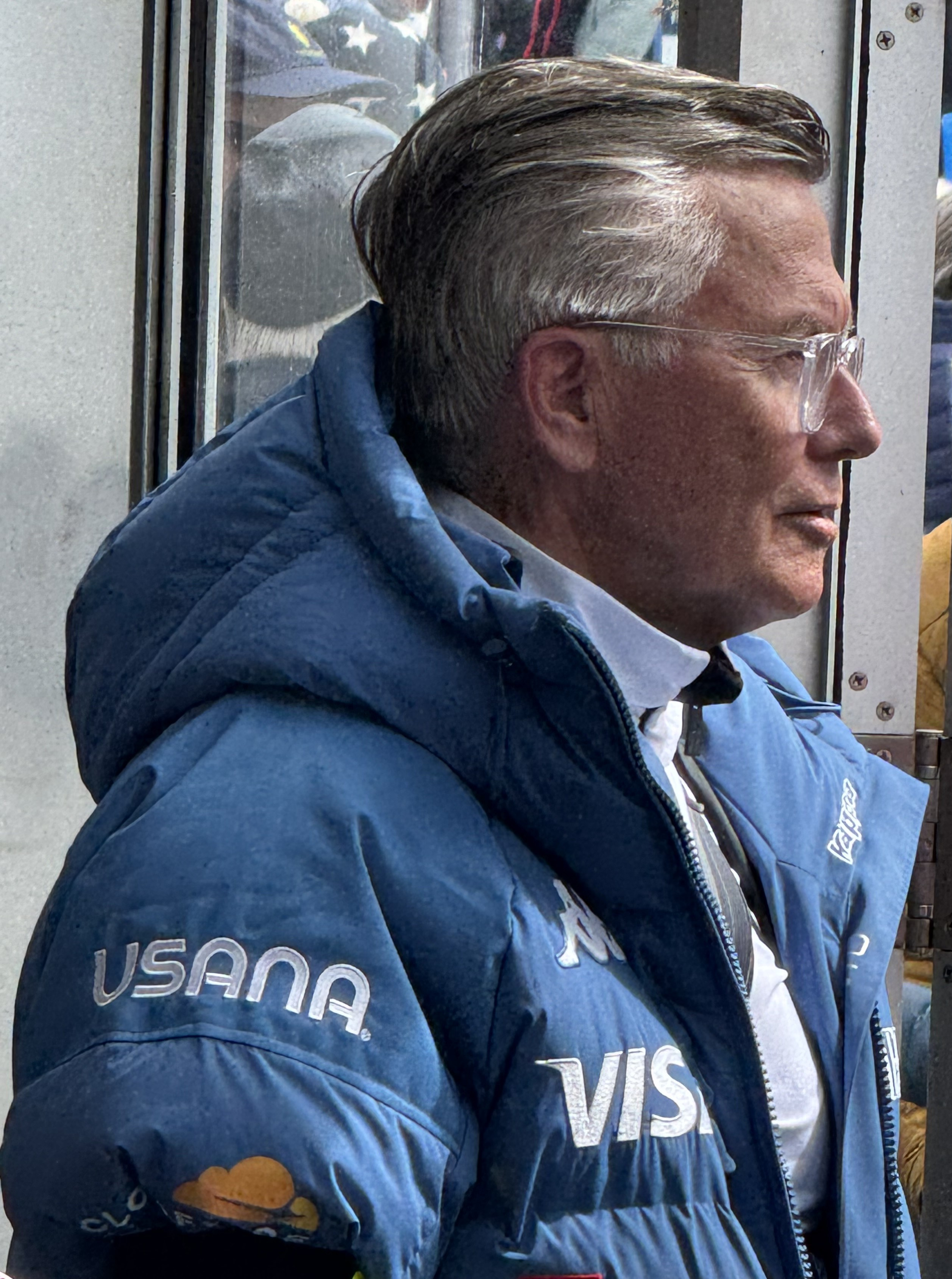
- Tschudi in 2025
- Born: 22 January 1949 (age 77)
- Occupations: Alpine skier; Businessman

Otto Victor Tschudi Jr. (born 22 January 1949) is a Norwegian alpine skier best known for success in the American NCAA Skiing Championships and World Pro Skiing ski racing circuits. He participated at the 1968 Winter Olympics in Grenoble and at the 1972 Winter Olympics in Sapporo, and achieved four top-ten results in World Cup slalom races. Between 1970 and 1972 he won five individual NCAA championships for the University of Denver Pioneers ski team while the team won two team championships. After the Sapporo Olympics Tschudi competed for eight seasons on the World Pro Skiing Tour, leading the Rossignol international team. He served as president of the Professional Ski Racers Association and as director of skiing at Winter Park Resort in Colorado. Tschudi later joined the financial-service firm Montgomery Securities in San Francisco, and rose to become a partner and managing director of international sales at Thomas Weisel Partners (now Stifel Financial).

== Early life ==
Tschudi grew up skiing at Norefjell Ski Resort near Krødsherad, Norway, where his parents owned a slopeside hotel. He was named to the Norwegian national ski team at age 14, and attended the Riis Skole, a college-prep high school in Oslo. Besides Norwegian, he became fluent in Swedish, Danish, French and German.

== Ski racing ==
Tschudi ran his first World Cup slalom at Kitzbuhel, on 21 January 1968, a day before his 19th birthday. He finished 10th. He failed to finish in the GS and downhill at the 1968 Grenoble Olympics. The following year he was recruited to attend the University of Denver by his ski coach, Willy Schaeffler. In the spring of 1969 Tschudi won the Norwegian national championship in giant slalom, and graduated high school. He arrived in Denver that June to compete in the 1970 season. He won the 1970 NCAA downhill championship while helping the team to its 13th NCAA championship. He repeated the downhill championship in 1971 and 1972, while also winning the slalom and combined championships, and the NorAm slalom championship, in 1971. In 1972 he won the U.S. slalom championship.

Tschudi continued to represent the Norwegian team in international racing, posting top ten results in three more World Cup slaloms in 1970 and 1971, and winning the CanAm slalom championship. At the 1972 Sapporo Olympics, he was disqualified in the GS and slalom. Following the Olympics, Tschudi turned professional, joining Bob Beattie’s World Pro Skiing for the 1972-73 season. He raced on the dual-format pro tour until 1982.

== Business career ==
In the lead-up to the 1972-73 World Pro Racing season Tschudi persuaded Rossignol North America to sponsor an international team including, among others, Tyler Palmer (USA), Jean-Claude Killy (France) and Malcolm Milne (Australia). Among his sponsors he recruited Sun Valley Resort, Avis, Air France, Look, Mossant, Swix, Smith and Raichle ski boots.

Tschudi graduated the University of Denver in 1974, with combined BS/BA degrees in hotel and restaurant management. Thereafter he focused on skiing-related businesses, launching a line of padded ski racing suits under the label Otto Racing, and (beginning in 1977) serving as director of skiing at Winter Park Resort in Colorado. With sports commentator Larry Zimmer, he hosted a weekly television ski program on Denver’s NBC affiliate.

Meanwhile, he continued to race on the pro circuit, representing fellow racers first as vice president of the International Ski Racers Association (1973–76), then as president of its successor organization, the Professional Ski Racers Association (1981–82). During his pro racing career he represented Rossignol, Atomic and Head skis and Swix ski wax; he also worked on athlete relationships for the International Management Group.

== Skiing-related activities ==
In 1992 Tschudi joined the Board of Trustees of the University of Denver, where he raised the money to re-establish the ski team.

== Personal life ==
Tschudi married Yvonne Louise Ericksen in 1978. They have one daughter, Solveig Louise Tschudi Lawrence (b. 1979) and three grandchildren.
