= Westminster Griffins =

- University: Westminster University
- Nickname: Griffs
- NCAA: Division II
- Conference: RMAC (primary); RMISA (skiing)
- Athletic director: Shelley Jarrard
- Location: Salt Lake City, Utah
- Varsity teams: 17 (8 men’s and 9 women’s)
- Basketball arena: Behnken Field House
- Soccer stadium: Dumke Field
- Colors: Purple and gold
- Mascot: Griffins
- Website: westminstergriffins.com

The Westminster Griffins are the athletic teams that represent Westminster University, located in Salt Lake City, Utah, in intercollegiate sports as a member of the NCAA Division II ranks, primarily competing in the Rocky Mountain Athletic Conference (RMAC) for most of its sports since the 2015–16 academic year (which they were a member on a previous stint from 1967–68 to 1978–79 before suspending its athletics program); while its men's and women's alpine skiing teams compete in the Rocky Mountain Intercollegiate Ski Association (RMISA) affiliated with the NCAA. The Griffins previously competed in the Frontier Conference of the National Association of Intercollegiate Athletics (NAIA) from 1998–99 to 2014–15.

== Sports ==
As of 2026, the listed NCAA Division II sports for men and women include alpine skiing, basketball, cross country and track, golf, lacrosse and soccer. Women's volleyball is also sponsored.

NON-NCAA sports, offered for men and women, include climbing, freeski, mountain biking, and snowboard.

== Athletic facilities ==
The following are athletic facilities for the Westminster Griffins:

- Behnken Field House — men's and women's basketball, volleyball
- Dumke Field — men's and women's soccer, men's and women's lacrosse teams
