= Denver Pioneers =

Sports teams representing the University of Denver

- University: University of Denver
- Nickname: Pioneers
- NCAA: Division I
- Conference: WCC (primary); Big 12 (gymnastics); Big East (lacrosse); NCHC (ice hockey); RMISA (skiing); MPSF (swimming & diving)
- Athletic director: Josh Berlo (June 2022)
- Location: Denver, Colorado
- Varsity teams: 18
- Basketball arena: Hamilton Gymnasium
- Ice hockey arena: Magness Arena
- Soccer stadium: University of Denver Soccer Stadium
- Lacrosse stadium: Peter Barton Lacrosse Stadium
- Colors: Crimson and gold
- Fight song: "D-Rah/Fairest of Colleges" (Dororthy Hickey, 1916)
- Website: denverpioneers.com

The Denver Pioneers are the sports teams of the University of Denver (DU). They play in the National Collegiate Athletic Association (NCAA) Division I, and have amassed 37 NCAA titles as of 2026, which is in the top 15 among all schools (24 in Skiing, 11 in men's ice hockey and 1 in men's lacrosse).

It was announced on October 31, 2025 that Denver would leave the Summit League to join the West Coast Conference beginning July 1, 2026. This marked a strategic shift which aligns nine of its athletic programs to similarly profiled private institutions like Pepperdine and Santa Clara. The university's major sports, like men's and women's lacrosse (Big East), men's hockey (NCHC), and gymnastics (Big 12), will remain in their existings leagues. Denver begins its tenure as a West Coast Conference member for men's and women's basketball, men's and women's soccer, tennis and golf for both men and women, plus women's volleyball. Other DU teams play in various conferences in the sports that are not sponsored by the WCC. The men's ice hockey team is a charter member of the National Collegiate Hockey Conference (NCHC), which formed in 2011 with play beginning in 2013. The lacrosse teams for men and women are members of the Big East Conference; the men began Big East play in the 2013–14 school year (2014 season), while the women left the Mountain Pacific Sports Federation (MPSF) after the 2016 lacrosse season. Men's and women's skiing compete in the Rocky Mountain Intercollegiate Ski Association, while the women's gymnastics team is an affiliate of the Big 12 Conference since 2015. The men's and women's swimming & diving teams joined the MPSF at the same time the university joined the WCC.

The university has been fielding athletic teams since 1867. DU's athletic teams are known as the Pioneers. In the early years of competition from the 1860s to the early 1920s, Denver had no official nickname, but sportswriters of the day referred to Denver teams as the "Ministers" or "Fighting Parsons" in homage to the Methodist heritage of the school. Denver officially became the "Pioneers" in 1925, after the result of a student nickname contest, and that nickname has been in place ever since.

Today, DU operates a full NCAA Division I athletic program with a mix of sports in and around the $85 million Daniel Ritchie Center for Sports and Wellness, which was completed in 2000. In 2017, Denver finished #4 in the men's Division I Capital One Cup rankings, the highest finish in school history, and has also won the Learfield Cup in nine of the past 10 seasons, emblematic of the top non-football Division I athletic department in the nation.

== Conference affiliations ==
- 1910–11 to 1936–37 – Rocky Mountain Faculty Athletic Conference
- 1937–38 to 1961–62 – Mountain States Athletic Conference (Note: Also known as the Skyline Conference.)
- 1962–63 to 1978–79 – NCAA Division I Independent
- 1979–80 to 1989–90 – NAIA Independent
- 1999–91 to 1997–98 – NCAA Division II Independent
- 1998–99 – NCAA Division I Independent
- 1999–2000 to 2011–12 – Sun Belt Conference
- 2012–13 – Western Athletic Conference
- 2013–14 to 2025–26 – Summit League
- 2026–27 to present – West Coast Conference

== Sports sponsored ==
Men's sports	Women's sports
Basketball	Basketball
Golf	Golf
Ice hockey	Gymnastics
Lacrosse	Lacrosse
Soccer	Soccer
Swimming and diving	Swimming and diving
Tennis	Tennis
	Volleyball
	Triathlon
Co-ed sports
Skiing

A member of the West Coast Conference, the University of Denver sponsors teams in seven men's, eight women's, and one coed NCAA sanctioned sports: Skiing is technically a men's sport, but it has been co-ed since 1983; the ski team is a member of the Rocky Mountain Intercollegiate Ski Association. The ice hockey team is a member of the National Collegiate Hockey Conference. The men's and women's lacrosse teams compete as associate members of the Big East Conference. The gymnastics team competes as an affiliate member of the Big 12 Conference, and the men's and women's swimming & diving teams compete in the Mountain Pacific Sports Federation, an Olympic sports conference that does not sponsor football or basketball.

=== Basketball ===
DU began playing basketball in 1904, playing primarily regional schedules until after WWII, when it became an NCAA independent Division I program until 1979. In 1999, the program returned to NCAA Division I, when it became a member of the Sun Belt Conference until 2012, when it joined the Western Athletic Conference for one season before joining the Summit League in 2013.

The men's basketball team won the 2013 WAC regular season Co-Championship and also made it to the second round of the 2013 National Invitation Tournament (NIT) after defeating Ohio, but losing to Maryland in Round 2. Denver also appeared in the 2005 NIT, losing to San Francisco (after it won the Sun Belt West Division), and also appeared in the 1959 NIT, losing to NYU. The men's basketball team has yet to appear in the NCAA tournament, while the women's team has made one appearance in the NCAA tournament in 2001 as an at-large berth.

=== Football ===
Football was once the most popular sport at Denver; the first DU football game was played in 1885 against Colorado College, which is believed to be the first intercollegiate football game played west of the Mississippi River. DU's football highlights include appearances in the 1946 Sun Bowl, 1947 Alamo Bowl, and 1951 Pineapple Bowl. The football team played in a 30,000-seat stadium that stood on campus from 1926 to 1971. The highest national ranking DU ever attained was #18 in the final coaches poll (UP) in 1954. However, the program was discontinued in early 1961 for financial reasons.

=== Ice hockey ===
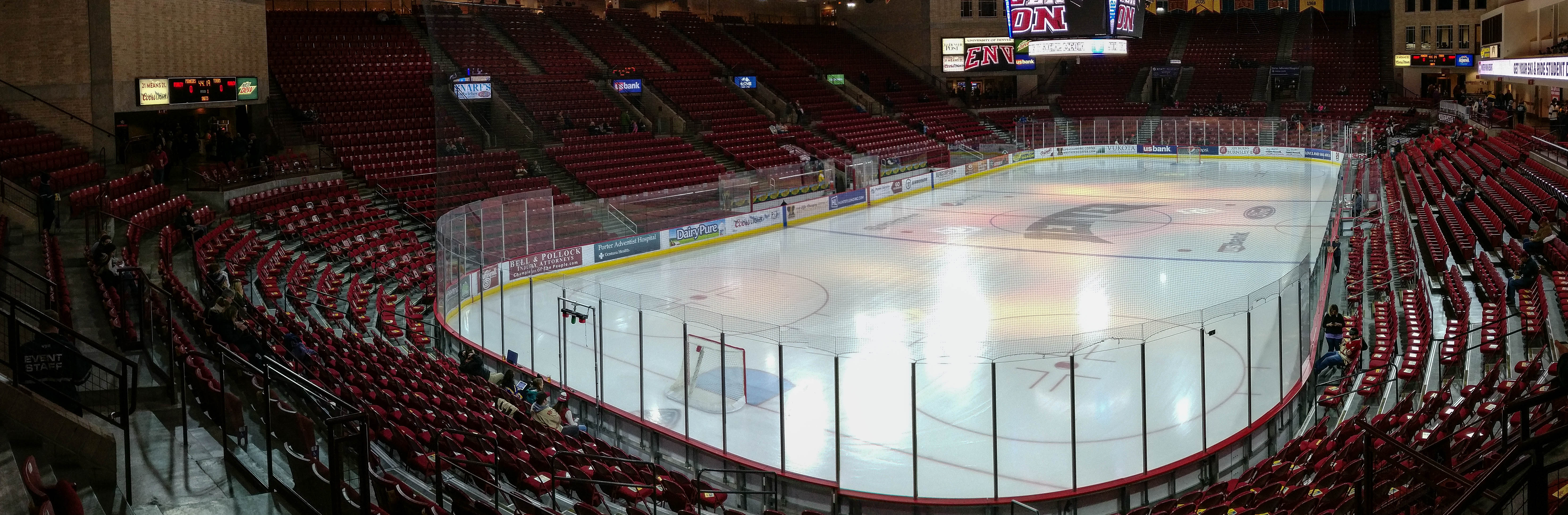
Magness Arena looking northwest

Ice hockey is DU's flagship spectator sport, regularly selling out the 6,026 seat Magness Arena on campus, the showpiece of the Ritchie Center for Sports and Wellness (completed in 2000). DU's Hockey Program has been playing NCAA Division I hockey since 1949–50. The Pioneers are one of the most successful programs in the history of collegiate hockey. They are first in all-time in NCAA National Hockey Championships with 11 (1958, 1960, 1961, 1968, 1969, 2004, 2005, 2017, 2022, 2024, 2026). The Pioneers have appeared in 20 NCAA Frozen Four Championships, with the most recent Frozen Four appearance coming in 2026. Since the creation of the Western Collegiate Hockey Association in 1959, the Pioneers have won 10 WCHA Regular Season Championships (now the recipients of the MacNaughton Cup) and 13 WCHA Playoff Championships (now the recipients of the Broadmoor Trophy).

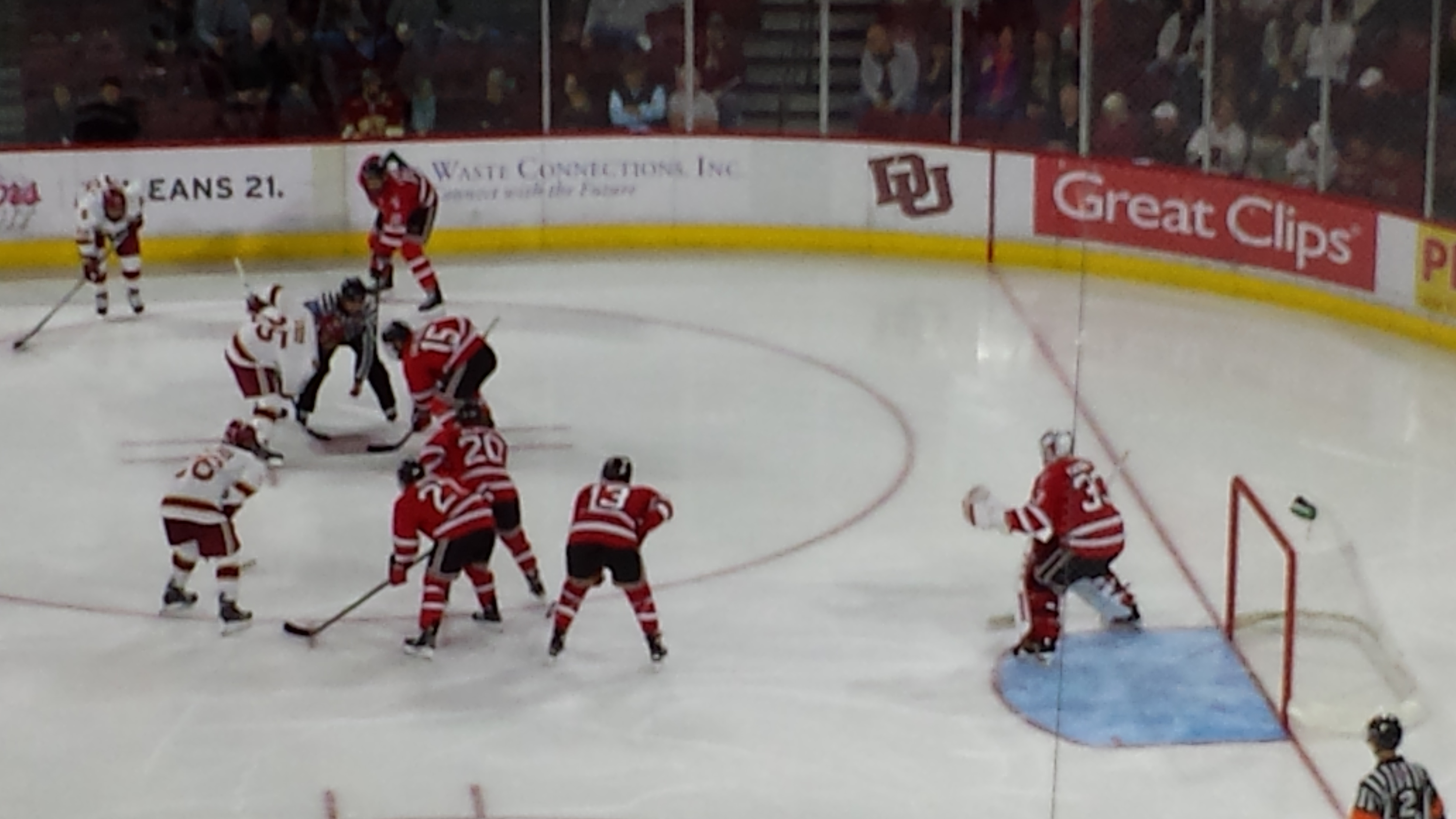
University of Denver (in white) men's ice hockey vs. Rensselaer Polytechnic Institute (in red), Magness Arena

Denver's ice hockey alumni include over 85 NHL hockey players, including Hockey Hall of Famer Glenn Anderson and current NHLers, such as 2007 Calder Memorial Trophy nominee Paul Stastny, Jason Zucker, Trevor Moore, Scott Mayfield, Danton Heinen, Will Butcher, Henrik Borgstrom, Troy Terry, Dylan Gambrell. Previous DU players who starred in the NHL besides Anderson include Keith Magnuson, Craig Patrick, Cliff Koroll, Peter McNab and Kevin Dineen, who coached the Florida Panthers of the NHL until 2013. Legendary hockey coaches at Denver include four former NHL players: Murray Armstrong, Marshall Johnston, Ralph Backstrom and Jim Montgomery. George Gwozdecky, who coached the team for 19 seasons until 2013, is the only person in NCAA history to win Division I Men's Hockey National Championships as a player (with Wisconsin in 1977), an assistant coach (with Michigan State in 1986) and as a head coach (with Denver in 2004 and 2005). The current (2018) coach is David Carle.

In 2013, DU hockey left the WCHA to launch the National Collegiate Hockey Conference (NCHC). The new conference was formed as a direct reaction to the Big Ten Conference's announcement that it would start a men's hockey league in 2013. The six charter members of the NCHC—DU, Colorado College, Miami (OH), Minnesota–Duluth, North Dakota, and Omaha—have combined for 21 NCAA championships in the sport. These schools were soon joined by St. Cloud State and Western Michigan to bring the league's membership at launch to eight.

=== Lacrosse ===
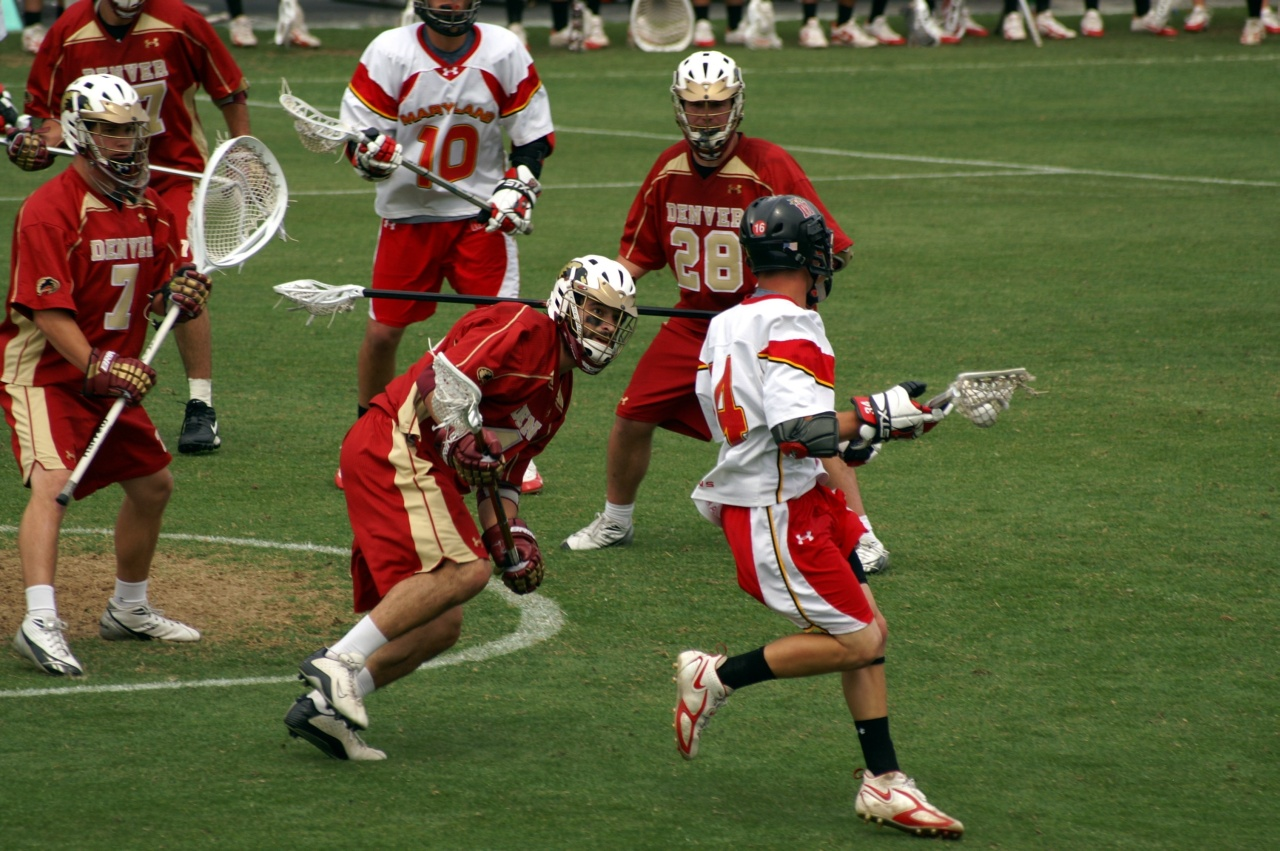
Denver plays Maryland in this 2006 lacrosse game

The Denver men's lacrosse team appeared in the 2006, 2008, 2010, 2011, 2012, 2013, 2014, 2015, 2016, 2017, 2018, 2021 and 2024 NCAA Tournaments. Denver won the NCAA men's lacrosse championship in 2015, beating Maryland, 10–5 in Philadelphia. It was the first-ever men's lacrosse championship by a school outside the Eastern Time Zone. Denver also appeared in the Final Four five other times in the 2010s and 2020s. In the Pioneers' first three Final Four appearances, they lost in the semifinals to Virginia in 2011 in Baltimore, Syracuse in 2013 in Philadelphia, and Duke in 2014 in Baltimore. The Pioneers also appeared in the 2017 and 2024 Final Fours, losing to Maryland in Foxboro, Mass., in 2017, and losing to the University of Notre Dame in 2024 in Philadelphia.

Women's lacrosse began as varsity sport in 1999, and DU played in the Mountain Pacific Sports Federation through the 2016 season and joined the DU men in the Big East Conference starting with the 2017 season. Denver has progressed to seven NCAA Tournaments in its history, with the highest level of advancement being to the final four in 2023. In that 2023 tournament, DU (23–1) beat the USC Trojans and Albany Great Danes in Denver in the first and second rounds, respectively, and beat the North Carolina Tar Heels in Chapel Hill, NC in the quarterfinals, before losing to the eventual NCAA champion Northwestern Wildcats in the semi-finals in Cary, N.C.

Prior to that 2023 high water mark, Denver went to the Elite eight in 2022, beating USC and Michigan before losing to Maryland, and the Sweet 16 in each of its other three NCAA appearances in 2013, 2014 and 2018, beating Jacksonville University in the first round in 2013 and 2014 before losing to the Florida Gators in those consecutive years in Gainesville, Fla. In 2018, DU beat High Point University in the first round before losing to the Maryland Terrapins in the second round in College Park, Maryland.

=== Ski ===
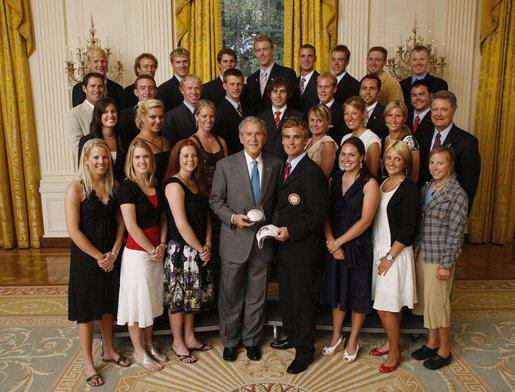
The Pioneers men's and women's ski teams are honored at the White House by President of the United States George W. Bush in June 2008 for their winning the 2008 National Collegiate Athletic Association team championship, their nineteenth skiing national title

Skiing is another strong sport. The Denver's team has won 24 NCAA titles (more skiing titles than any other school). The Pioneers have won 10 championships since 2000. DU won NCAA titles in 2014, 2016 and 2018, "three-peated" NCAA titles in 2008, 2009 and 2010, won an NCAA title in 2005 and as well as three consecutive NCAA titles from 2000 to 2002.

=== Soccer ===
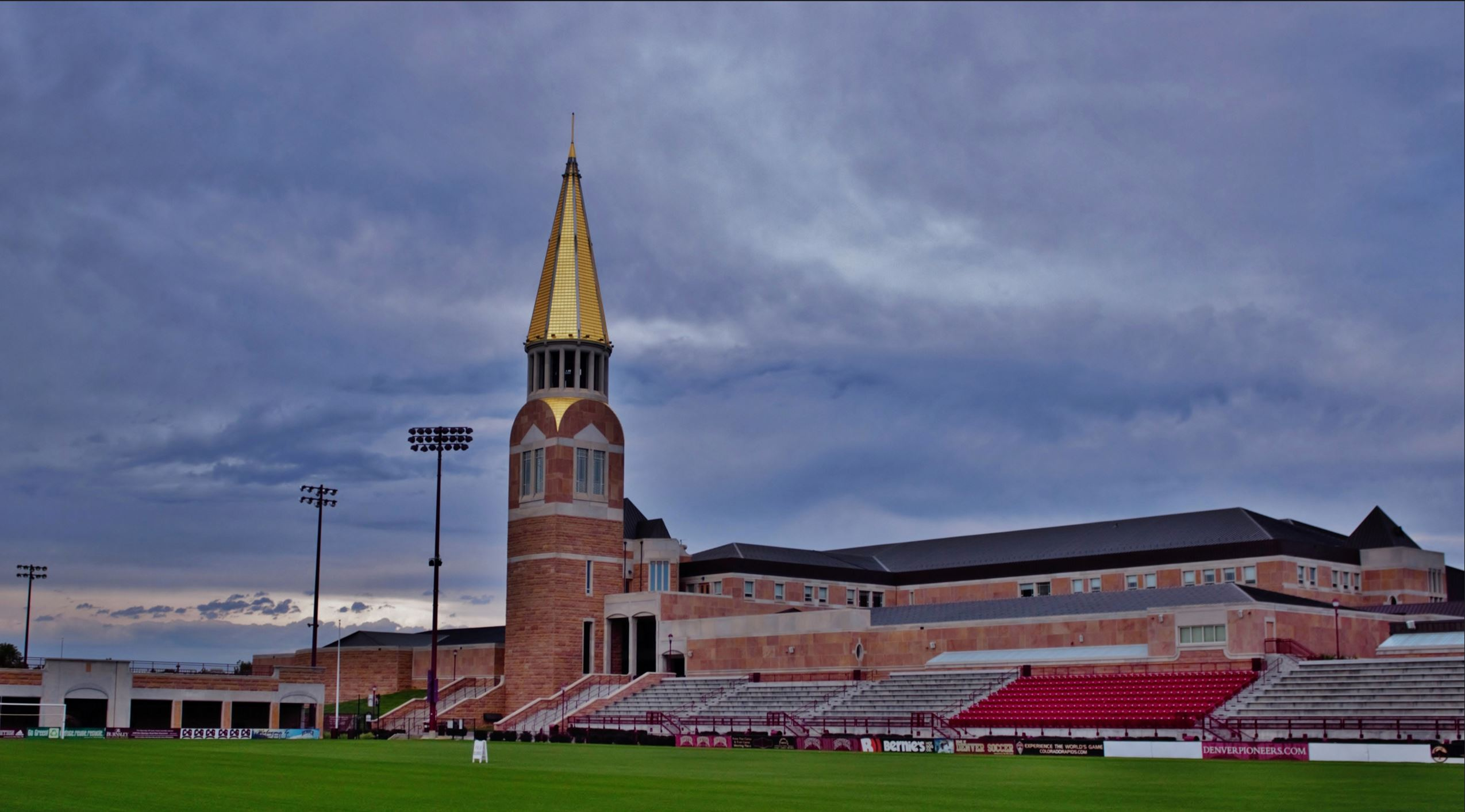
Richie Center and soccer field

The DU men's soccer team has appeared in the 1970, 2008, 2010, 2013, 2014, 2015, 2016, 2018, 2019, 2022 and 2024 NCAA tournaments, reaching its first ever NCAA College Cup (final four) in 2016 in Houston, where the Pioneers lost in double overtime, 2–1 to Wake Forest University. Denver also reached the semi finals of the 2024 NCAA College Cup, losing to the eventual champion The University of Vermont in penalty kicks after an overtime tie.

Jamie Franks was named the program's 10th head coach in January 2015.

The DU women's soccer team advanced to the Sweet 16 of the 2012 NCAA Women's College Cup Tournament, and have also appeared in the 2006, 2007, 2008, 2009, 2013, 2017, 2018 and 2022 NCAA Tournaments.

=== Other sports ===
The women's volleyball team has made NCAA tournament appearances in 2014, 2015, 2016, 2017 and 2018, losing in the first round to Colorado State University, University of Washington, Stanford University, California Polytechnic State University, and the University of Utah respectively.

The women's gymnastics team has been to 17 straight NCAA Regional tournaments and finished a program-high 4th at the 2019 NCAA National Championships in their fourth appearance in the national finals. The team is a member of the Big 12 Conference after moving from its former home of the Mountain Rim Gymnastics Conference in 2015.

The DU men's and women's tennis teams are consistently ranked in the top 35 to top 70 of all Division I collegiate tennis teams. The men's team has produced All-Americans, including a Men's Singles player ranked 11th in the country, and the team broke into the top 25 during the 2010 season. The men's team upset regional #1 seed Florida in the first round of the 2013 NCAA Tournament. The women's team has its lone NCAA tournament victory in 2017 over USC, and had one of its doubles team advance to the NCAA final eight for the first time in 2017.

The women's basketball team appeared in the 2001 NCAA Tournament, where it lost to Virginia Tech in the first round.

The women's golf team won the 2009 NCAA West Regional and later finished 5th in the finals of the 2009 NCAA tournament. DU also appeared in the 2008 (6th) and 2007 (14th) NCAA finals, as well as multiple NCAA regionals.

=== History and notable athletic figures ===
Denver's first athletic event was in a baseball game in 1867 (a loss to the Arapahoe Baseball Club), a sport that was played at the varsity level until 1999 when DU returned to full NCAA D-I status. DU's best baseball achievements were appearances in the 1970 and 1973 NCAA baseball tournaments.

Other notable Denver sports alumni include former Major League Baseball player Dan Schatzeder, NBA basketball players Vince Boryla and Byron Beck, CFL Hall of Famer and former NFL football player Sam Etcheverry, 1952 US Olympic Long Jump Gold Medalist Jerome Biffle, former US Olympic Committee Executive Director Lyman Bingham, and MLS/US National soccer player Nat Borchers. San Antonio Spurs head coach Gregg Popovich received a master's degree from DU but did not play any varsity sports there. Five-time world champion and US Olympic figure Skating star Michelle Kwan graduated from DU in 2009. Former DU basketball player David Adkins went on to greater fame outside of sports as comedian and actor Sinbad. Phil Heath a former DU basketball player in the early 2000s, won the Mr. Olympia Bodybuilding Championship seven consecutive times between 2011 and 2017.

== Championships ==
=== NCAA team championships ===
The University of Denver has 36 NCAA team national championships, the most of any Division I school outside of the Power Five conferences.

- Men's (26)
  - Ice Hockey (11): 1958, 1960, 1961, 1968, 1969, 2004, 2005, 2017, 2022, 2024, 2026
  - Lacrosse (1): 2015
  - Skiing (14): 1954, 1955, 1956, 1957, 1961, 1962, 1963, 1964, 1965, 1966, 1967, 1969, 1970, 1971
- Coed (10)
  - Skiing (10): 2000, 2001, 2002, 2005, 2008, 2009, 2010, 2014, 2016, 2018
- see also:
  - Big East Conference NCAA team championships
  - List of NCAA schools with the most NCAA Division I championships

=== Other national team championships ===
Note: Skiing was a men's NCAA sport from 1954 to 1982 and became co-ed in 1983. The AIAW sponsored women's skiing and a national championship from 1977 to 1982 before being superseded by the NCAA, at which time skiing became co-ed.

Denver won one AIAW championship:

- Women's (1)
  - Gymnastics (1): 1982 (Division II)

Denver has won three team national championships that were not bestowed by the NCAA:

- Men's (3)
  - Skiing (3): 1949, 1951, 1952
- see also:
  - List of NCAA schools with the most Division I national championships
