= Willy Schaeffler =

German skier, coach, and resort developer

- Born: Wilhelm Josef Schaeffler; 13 December 1915; Kaufbeuren, Bavaria, Germany
- Died: 9 April 1989 (aged 73); Denver, Colorado, U.S.
- Occupations: Skiing coach, administrator

Wilhelm Josef "Willy" Schaeffler (13 December 1915 – 9 April 1989) was a German-American skiing champion, winning coach, and ski resort developer. In skiing, he is best known to the public for his intensive training programs that led the U.S. Ski Team to gold and bronze medals at the 1972 Olympics and his success at the University of Denver.

In development circles, Schaeffler is known for his role as a founder of the Professional Skiers Association (PSA), as an early developer of the Colorado ski area, Arapahoe- or A-Basin, as well as for the development of Vail, Whistler Blackcomb, Mineral King and Independence Lake. He is also renowned as the director of Skiing Events for the 1960 Winter Olympics in Squaw Valley—now known as Palisades—California. It was during those Winter Games that he met and befriended a future president of the United States, John F. Kennedy, which later lead to significant friendships with the families of Robert and Ethel, Teddy, Jackie, and others of the Kennedy legacy.

== Early years ==
Schaeffler was born in Kaufbeuren, Bavaria, on 13 December 1915. Working in the mountains as a shepherd, he was a competitive skier by the age of eight. In 1932, at the age of sixteen, he was the winner of the Bavarian Alpine Championships. At 20, Schaeffler was named to the German Olympic team for 1936, but broke both legs before the IV Winter Games in Garmisch-Partenkirchen, and was unable to compete.

== World War II ==
When World War II broke out in 1939, Schaeffler was drafted into the German Army as a "political unsafe," because of a long family history of opposition-politics, and eventually ended up in a penal battalion on the Russian Front. Captured and tortured by the Red Army, he escaped and made it west to Austria, where after recovering from grave injuries, he joined the anti-Nazi resistance, known as the Austrian Underground, with forces working in the Austrian Alps.

Following the war, significantly because of his underground activities, Schaeffler was allowed to train the United States Army Europe in rock climbing and alpine skiing, and in this role taught General George S. Patton and other high-ranking U.S. military personnel how to ski and rock climb. This, and his romance with the American Betty Durnford, his future wife of 14 years, was his ticket to the United States emigration; he moved to the U.S. with Betty under her sponsorship in the spring of 1948. Together, they had two sons, Bill and Jimmy.

== United States ==
=== Instructor ===
In June 1948, Schaeffler wrote to Larry Jump, who was setting up the Arapahoe Basin ski area in Colorado, looking for work as a ski instructor. Jump hired Schaeffler, who moved with his new wife to Colorado that year, and introduced the alpine skiing technique known as "short-swing," which remained the standard beginner training technique across North America for decades. In late 1957, Sports Illustrated featured Schaeffler and parts of this new technique in a two-issue cover story, titled "Revolution In Skiing." The article featured remarkable pencil drawings by renowned artist and content innovator Robert Riger.

=== University of Denver ===
Schaeffler was hired for his second job at the University of Denver; he was the coach of the Pioneers ski team from 1948–1970, and was also the coach of its soccer team from 1962–1969. Under his tutelage, during these 22 years, his D.U. Pioneers won 14 of 18 NCAA national championships, which began with the inaugural edition in 1954. By a large margin, the 14 D-1 Championship remains a record today. Schaeffler is credited with putting D.U.'s athletic program on both national and international maps during the 1950s, 1960s, and 1970s. D.U. awarded him a Bachelor of Arts degree, as well as a position within the Athletic Department as an assistant professor in physical education.

In overall competitions, Denver placed in the top three, 122 times out of 123 meets, with 100 of those being first-place. This record of wins and places stands unchallenged in the world to this day. Thirty-three of his racers were named to the NCAA All-American teams, and fifteen to Olympic and World Championship teams. Otto Tschudi, Marv Crawford, Keith Wegeman, and Chuck Ferries are among his premier D.U. Ski Team Pioneers.

=== Design ===
In 1957, Schaeffler became the Director of the Ski Events for the 1960 Winter Olympics in Squaw Valley, California, and was responsible for designing the alpine courses. It was here that he began his lifelong friendships and associations with both John F. Kennedy and Walt Disney.

In the early 1970s, Schaeffler was part of the group that submitted the winning bid for the 1976 Winter Olympics for Denver in 1970; but this bid was withdrawn by the voters of Colorado in late 1972, and the games returned to Innsbruck in 1976 for a second time in twelve years. Schaeffler's work on the design of the runs at Squaw Valley had placed him in high demand across North America and around the world as a ski area and ski run designer. Consequently, over the next two and a half decades, he consulted with scores of ski resorts. One of these was the original plan for what is today the Whistler Blackcomb resort, site of the alpine events of the 2010 Winter Olympics. His design for the downhill course, later named for Dave Murray, was used decades later as the main alpine course for those games.

=== Administrator ===
In 1970, Schaeffler was named as the Director of the U.S. Alpine Ski Team; Schaeffler held this position until 1973. During this period, he served as head coach for the U.S. team at the 1972 Winter Olympics in Sapporo, Japan, where the women's team won gold and bronze medals. Not surprisingly, Schaeffler is often referred to as "America's Most Successful Ski Coach".

Schaeffler was largely responsible for moving the U.S. National Ski Team to its permanent headquarters in Park City, Utah, in 1974 and established the first national ski training center here. He laid out large parts of the area, including several runs on Ski Team Ridge, known as the U.S. Ski Team training runs. Today, a ski run is named in his honor at Park City, called "Willy's Run." Another run in Beaver Creek, Colorado, called "Willy's Face," is also dedicated to the memory of Schaeffler. A third, in the ski area Willy Schaeffler helped found Arapahoe Basin, in Colorado, also bears his name, titled "Pioneer Willy." Especially in his work as a technical delegate for the International Ski Federation (FIS), Schaeffler was passionate about ski and ski racing safety, and skiing opportunities for the disabled and underprivileged.

Schaeffler developed a special intensive training program for his skiers, plus, he planned and proposed a sports medicine program, extreme safety mechanisms, and a traveling medical team for his athletes. Schaeffler was also one of the founders of Professional Ski Instructors of America (PSIA), separating instructor training within the USSA into an independent organization.

=== Developer ===
During the 1960s, Schaeffler worked with Walt Disney in an effort to open new ski resorts. The first project, in Mineral King, expanded greatly during design, and was eventually planned to host more than a million visitors a year. The Sierra Club objected, and a lengthy series of court cases followed, until the Disney organization finally gave up on the idea, citing costs and delays, following Disney's death in late 1966. A second attempt, again involving Disney's best designers and developers, followed at Independence Lake near Mt. Lola in the northern California, not far from Lake Tahoe. A similar series of environmental lawsuits followed, and these plans were also abandoned, along with much of Disney's interest in the skiing destination market.

=== Awards ===
In 1968, Schaeffler received USSA's highest award for outstanding service to the sport of skiing, named the Julius Blegen Award. The next year, he received the USSA Rocky Mountain Division's highest award, the Halstead Trophy, for outstanding service. Schaeffler was inducted into Colorado Ski Hall of Fame in 1978, the Colorado Sports Hall of Fame in 1973 and the National Ski Hall of Fame. In 1977, he assisted in the formation of the Special Olympics, focused on disabled skiers, along with Arapahoe Basin's Larry and Marnie Jump, Winter Park's Jerry Groswold and Willie Williams, and the Kennedy family. The U.S. Ski Association's Willy Schaeffler Award is a further tribute to Mr. Schaeffler's skiing and coaching prowess.

== Legacy ==
At age 74, Schaeffler died at St. Luke's hospital in Denver in April 1988, after enduring five open-heart surgical procedures and a pacemaker implanted over the previous seventeen years. Established by his son, Jimmy, a permanent set of scholarships focused on the needy, reside at the University of Denver, where today further tribute is paid daily to Schaeffler. One is a foreign exchange scholarship for disabled student-athletes, with a preference for competitive skiers; another is a second disabled-focused fund, the Willy Schaeffler Norwegian Scholarship Fund, and the rest involve optional foreign exchange scholarships for able-bodied student athletes, also with a preference for competitive skiers. Currently, an additional Willy Schaeffler endowment fund is in its early stages of development, that will support additional disabled and other recipients' needs, under the aegis of the Willy Schaeffler Scholarship Fund (WSSF) Committee, at Denver University.
