= Odd Hammernes =

Norwegian former ski jumper (born 1948)

Personal information
- Born: 28 September 1948 (age 77) Asker, Norway

Sport
- Sport: Ski jumping

Odd Hammernes (born 28 September 1948) is a Norwegian former ski jumper. He was born in Asker and represented the club Asker SK. He competed at the 1976 Winter Olympics in Innsbruck.
