= Bill Marolt =

American alpine ski racer, coach, and sports administrator

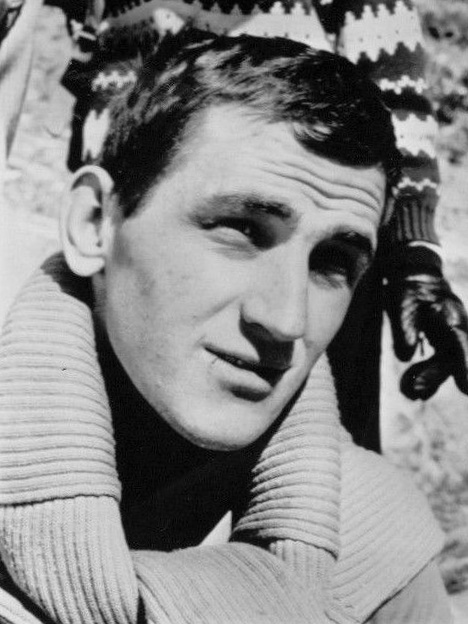
- Marolt in 1963

Personal information
- Born: September 1, 1943 (age 82) Aspen, Colorado, U.S.
- Height: 178 cm (5 ft 10 in)
- Weight: 80 kg (176 lb)

Sport
- Sport: Alpine skiing
- Club: Aspen Ski Club; University of Colorado
- Retired: 1968

William Charles Marolt (born September 1, 1943) is a retired American alpine ski racer, coach, and sports administrator. Originally from Aspen, Colorado, Marolt made the U.S. Olympic team in 1964 at age twenty and was twelfth in the giant slalom. Domestically, he won four individual NCAA titles: downhill (1963, 1965), slalom (1966), and combined (1966).

After graduating from the University of Colorado in Boulder, Marolt was a ski coach there, leading the Buffaloes to seven consecutive NCAA titles from 1972 through 1978. He then became a national coach, but after the 1984 Winter Olympics, returned to Boulder to succeed the retiring Eddie Crowder as CU's athletic director, and remained in that position for twelve years.

In 1996, Marolt was appointed president and chief executive officer of the U.S. Ski and Snowboard Association, and retired in 2014. He is a member of the National Ski Hall of Fame and the Colorado Sports Hall of Fame. His elder brother Max was also an Olympic alpine racer.
