= Crested Butte Mountain Resort =

Ski area in Colorado, United States

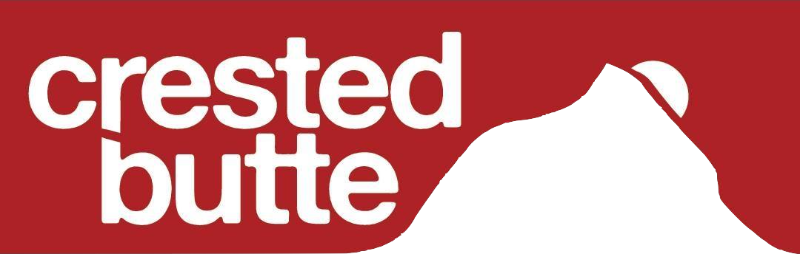

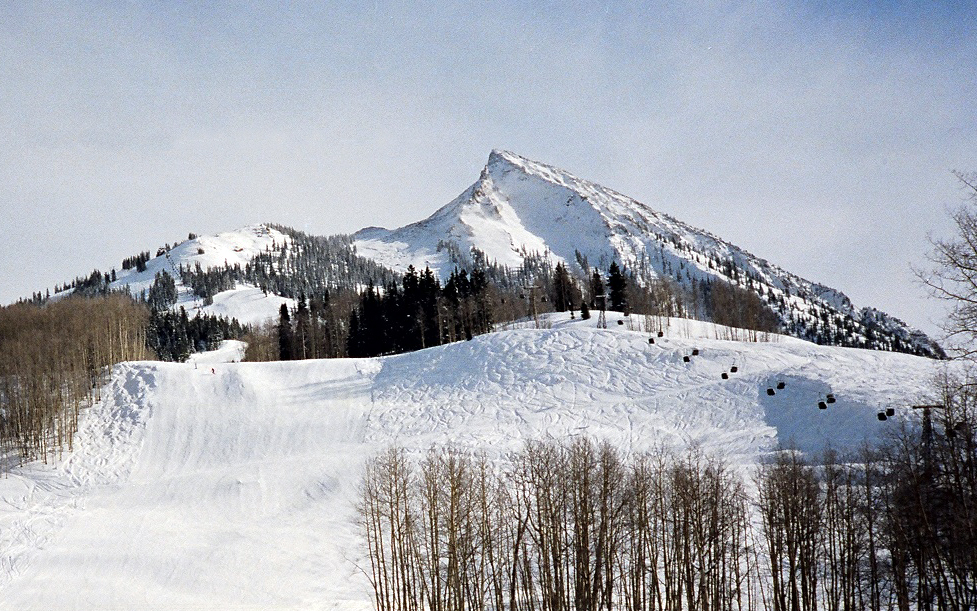
- Crested Butte in 1988

- Location in Colorado Crested Butte Mountain Resort (the United States)
- Location: Gunnison County, Colorado, USA
- Nearest city: Crested Butte, Colorado
- Coordinates: 38°53′59″N 106°57′54″W
- Status: Operating
- Owner: Vail Resorts
- Vertical: 3,055 ft (931 m)
- Top elevation: 12,162 feet (3,707 m)
- Base elevation: 9,375 feet (2,858 m)
- Skiable area: 1,547 acres (6.26 km^{2})
- Trails: 121; 23% beginner 57% intermediate 20% advanced/expert
- Longest run: 2.6 m (8 ft 6 in)
- Lift system: 15 (4 High speed quad chairs, 3 fixed-grip quad chairs, 3 triple chairs, 2 T-Bars, 3 Magic Carpets)
- Terrain parks: Yes, 2
- Snowfall: 300 inches (7.6 m) per year
- Snowmaking: Yes, 282 acres (1.14 km^{2})
- Website: skicb.com

Crested Butte Mountain Resort is a ski resort at Mount Crested Butte in Gunnison County, Colorado, United States.

== History ==
Crested Butte Mountain Resort opened in 1960 when two men—Fred Rice and Dick Eflin—purchased a ranch on Mt. Crested Butte. An operating permit enabling the resort to be built was approved by the United States Forest Service the following year. The resort struggled on for its first ten years. Some of the first lifts included a t-bar at the base area.

In 1963, Crested Butte constructed a top-to-bottom gondola from the base area to near where the bottom of the High Lift is today. The resort was the second resort to open a gondola in Colorado, after Vail Ski Resort opened theirs in 1962. Constructed by Carlevaro-Savio, the three-person Silver Queen Gondola was notorious for being cramped and the cabins were known to have frequent collisions. The gondola lasted until summer of 1973, when a bubble double chairlift replaced it. Other opening lifts included a Doppelmayr T-Bar that serviced the training hill on Buckley.

Riblet constructed a double chairlift called Twister in 1969 to supplement the Silver Queen Gondola. The lift serviced expert and advanced trails on the west slope of the mountain, but following the additions of the Silver Queen and Paradise quads only operated sporadically until 2013 when it was removed from service.

In 1973, a bubble double replaced the old gondola and provided main access out of the base area for the next twenty years. Another double chairlift, Peachtree, was built at the base area to service a set of learning trails between Silver Queen and the T-Bar area. Peachtree still operates today.

In 1979, Riblet constructed the Teocalli double chairlift on the north side of the mountain, providing access to some intermediate trails, and double chairlifts were also built servicing the Paradise Bowl, which opened intermediate trails to the east of Twister as well as the East River area below that.

In 1982, Poma constructed a triple chairlift running out of the base area to replace the double chair Keystone lift, servicing beginner and low intermediate trails on the lower slopes of the mountain. The following year, they expanded the mountain by constructing two additional triple chairlifts, Gold Link and Painter Boy, servicing beginner and intermediate terrain to the north of the main mountain. In 1987, Poma constructed a platter lift servicing the North Face chutes above East River.

In 1991, a T-Bar was constructed by Doppelmayr. Called the High Lift, the new T-Bar provided access to the Headwall chutes above Paradise Bowl, and also opened additional expert terrain on the upper part of the mountain.

In 1992, Crested Butte entered the high-speed lift market, with Poma replacing the Silver Queen bubble double with a high-speed quad. The quad services the same terrain as the old lift, but is aligned slightly differently so as to provide better access to the High Lift. It also provides access to terrain on all other parts of the mountain as well. Two years later, the Paradise double was replaced with another high-speed quad. In 1997, the Keystone triple was replaced with a high-speed quad, and the original triple was used to upgrade East River.

In 2004, Crested Butte was acquired by Triple Peaks, LLC. The Keystone Express lift was renamed the Red Lady Express, while the North Face platter was replaced with a t-bar. A fixed-grip quad, Prospect, was also constructed in the Painter Boy area to open up new terrain in the area east of Gold Link and provide ski-in-ski-out access. In 2005, another fixed-grip quad, West Wall, replaced the T-bar on Buckley. In 2006, a high-speed quad replaced the East River triple chairlift.

In 2008, CNL Lifestyle Properties acquired the resorts owned by Triple Peaks. Triple Peaks continued to operate them under a lease. In 2016, CNL sold the Triple Peaks-operated properties to Och-Ziff Capital Management.

On June 4, 2018, Vail Resorts announced plans to acquire Crested Butte Mountain Resort.

=== Terrain aspects ===
- North: 45%
- West: 45%
- East: 10%

=== Lift system ===
Crested Butte has twelve chairlifts, and three magic carpets.

| Name | Type | Builder | Year built | Vertical (feet) | Length (feet) | Notes |
|---|---|---|---|---|---|---|
| Silver Queen Express | High Speed Quad | Poma | 1992 | 2,058 | 7,800 | Replaced a Riblet double chair, which had bubbles. |
| Red Lady Express | High Speed Quad | Poma | 1997 | 971 | 5,647 | |
| Paradise Express | High Speed Quad | Leitner-Poma | 1994 | 1,302 | 5,682 | |
| East River Express | High Speed Quad | Leitner-Poma | 2006 | 1,024 | 3,458 | |
| Prospect | Quad | Leitner-Poma | 2004 | 541 | 2,547 | |
| Westwall | Quad | Leitner-Poma | 2005 | 469 | 1,741 | |
| Teocalli | Quad | Skytrac | 2019 | 642 | 3,791 | |
| Peachtree | Triple | Skytrac | 2021 | 193 | 912 | |
| Painter Boy | Triple | Poma | 1983 | 335 | 1,800 | |
| Gold Link | Triple | Poma | 1983 | 524 | 2,477 | |
| North Face | T-Bar | Leitner-Poma | 2004 | 476 | 1,560 | |
| High Lift | T-Bar | Doppelmayr | 1991 | 600 | 2,650 | Only Doppelmayr lift on the mountain. |

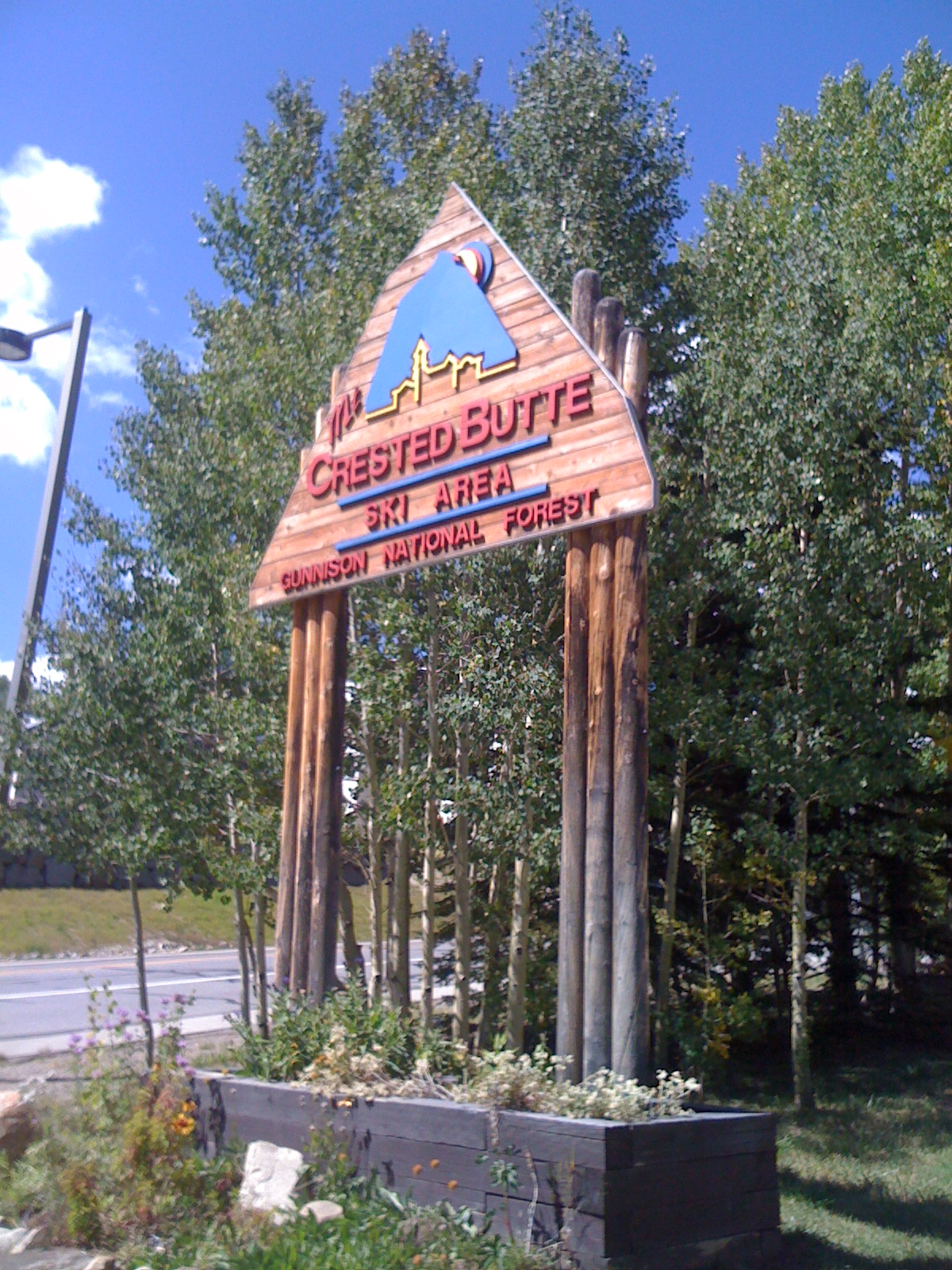
Mt. Crested Butte ski area on State Highway 135, Mt. Crested Butte, Colorado

== See also ==
- Crested Butte, Colorado
- Mount Crested Butte, Colorado
- Gunnison County, Colorado
- Bo Callaway
- State of Colorado
