= Denver Pioneers ski team =

American collegiate ski team

- University: University of Denver
- Head coach: Joonas Rasanen, Alpine; Rogan Brown, Nordic
- Conference: RMISA
- Location: Winter Park, Colorado; Tabernash, Colorado
- Home mountain: Winter Park Resort; Devil's Thumb Ranch
- Colors: Crimson and gold

NCAA championships
- 1954, 1955, 1956, 1957, 1961, 1962, 1963, 1964, 1965, 1966, 1967, 1969, 1970, 1971, 2000, 2001, 2002, 2005, 2008, 2009, 2010, 2014, 2016, 2018

The University of Denver Ski Team is a collegiate team that has won a record 24 NCAA Championships the first dating back to 1954. Under the direction of coach Willy Schaeffler, a member of the National Ski Hall of Fame, the Pioneers skied their way to 13 championships. Under Schaeffler's leadership, the University of Denver Ski Team "completely dominated intercollegiate skiing" in the United States for two decades. Schaeffler's "passion for preparedness" and tough training regimen yielded "remarkable" success in competition.

The program was absent from 1984–1992, but surged back onto the national scene winning eight of the first 12 NCAA Championships this century. The Alpine team currently practices less than 70 miles away from campus at Winter Park Resort. The Nordic team calls Devil's Thumb Ranch Resort home, only 78 miles from the university.

== National championships ==
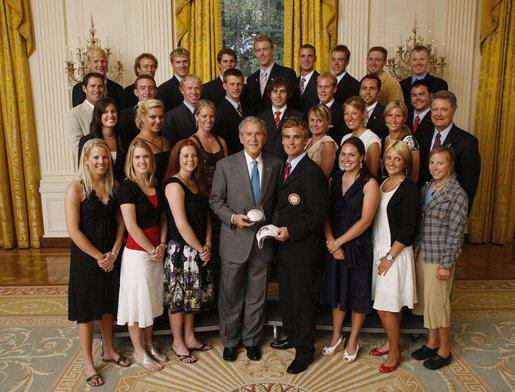
The 2008 National Champions with President George W. Bush

The Pioneers won their 24th team championship in 2018, the most by any ski team in NCAA history. Colorado is second with 20 titles, and Utah is third with 11. The 24 ski titles are the third most NCAA Division I titles among any team in any single sport. Oklahoma State wrestling holds the most national titles with 34, followed by Southern Cal men’s outdoor track and field (26) and Iowa wrestling (23).

NCAA Champions
Year	Location	Head Coach
1954	Reno, Nev.	Willy Schaeffler
1955	Northfield, VT	Willy Schaeffler
1956	Winter Park, Colo.	Willy Schaeffler
1957	Snow Basin, Utah	Willy Schaeffler
1961	Middlebury, Vt.	Willy Schaeffler
1962	Squaw Valley, Calif.	Willy Schaeffler
1963	Solitude, Utah	Willy Schaeffler
1964	Franconia Notch, N.H.	Willy Schaeffler
1965	Crystal Mountain, Wash.	Willy Schaeffler
1966	Crested Butte, Colo.	Willy Schaeffler
1967	Kingfield, Maine	Willy Schaeffler
1969	Steamboat Springs, Colo.	Willy Schaeffler
1970	Franconia Notch, N.H.	Willy Schaeffler
1971	Terry Peak, S.D.	Peder Pytte
2000	Park City, Utah	Kurt Smitz
2001	Middlebury, Vt.	Kurt Smitz
2002	Anchorage, Alaska	Kurt Smitz
2005	Stowe, Vt.	Kurt Smitz
2008	Bozeman, Mont.	Andy LeRoy/David Stewart
2009	Bethel-Rumford, Maine	Andy LeRoy/David Stewart
2010	Steamboat Springs, Colo.	Andy LeRoy/David Stewart
2014	Park City/Soldier Hollow, Utah	Andy LeRoy/David Stewart
2016	Steamboat Springs, Colo.	Andy LeRoy/David Stewart
2018	Steamboat Springs, Colo.	Andy LeRoy/David Stewart

== Individual National Champions ==
The Pioneers have produced 80 NCAA individual champions, including three in 2011.

Year	Gender	Athlete	Event
1996	M	Geir Skari	Classical
2000	M	Pietro Broggini	Classical
2001	M	Wolf Wallendorf	Classical
2002	M	Ola Berger	Classical
2005	M	Rene Reisshauer	Classical
2006	M	John Stene	Classical
2000	M	Pietro Broggini	Freestyle
2001	M	Pietro Broggini	Freestyle
2002	M	Ola Berger	Freestyle
2005	M	Rene Reisshauer	Freestyle
2007	M	Rene Reisshauer	Freestyle
1994	M	Erik Roland	Giant Slalom
2007	M	Adam Cole	Giant Slalom
2008	M	John Buchar	Giant Slalom
2010	M	Leif Kristian Haugen	Giant Slalom
2011	M	Seppi Stiegler	Giant Slalom
1954	M	John L'Orange	Slalom
1965	M	Rick Chaffee	Slalom
1967	M	Rick Chaffee	Slalom
1968	M	Dennis McCoy	Slalom
1969	M	Paul Rachetto	Slalom
1971	M	Otto Tschudi	Slalom
1973	M	Peik Christensen	Slalom
1975	M	Peik Christensen	Slalom
1998	M	Christian Hutter	Slalom
1999	M	Jayme Smithers	Slalom
2007	M	Adam Cole	Slalom
2008	M	John Buchar	Slalom
1965	M	Rick Chaffee	Alpine (Discontinued)
1967	M	Jon Terje Øverland	Alpine (Discontinued)
1968	M	Dennis McCoy	Alpine (Discontinued)
1969	M	Paul Rachetto	Alpine (Discontinued)
1971	M	Otto Tschudi	Alpine (Discontinued)
1973	M	Peik Christensen	Alpine (Discontinued)
1974	M	Peik Christensen	Alpine (Discontinued)
1962	M	Mike Barr	Downhill (Discontinued)
1966	M	Jon Terje Øverland	Downhill (Discontinued)
1967	M	Dennis McCoy	Downhill (Discontinued)
1970	M	Otto Tschudi	Downhill (Discontinued)
1971	M	Otto Tschudi	Downhill (Discontinued)
1972	M	Otto Tschudi	Downhill (Discontinued)
1954	M	Marvin Crawford	Individual Cross-Country (Discontinued)
1958	M	Clarence L. Servold	Individual Cross-Country (Discontinued)
1959	M	Clarence L. Servold	Individual Cross-Country (Discontinued)
1970	M	Ole Ivar F. Hansen	Individual Cross-Country (Discontinued)
1971	M	Ole Ivar F. Hansen	Individual Cross-Country (Discontinued)
1954	M	Willis S. Olson	Jumping (Discontinued)
1955	M	Willis S. Olson	Jumping (Discontinued)
1956	M	Willis S. Olson	Jumping (Discontinued)
1957	M	Alfred L. Vincelette	Jumping (Discontinued)
1958	M	Oddvar Rønnestad	Jumping (Discontinued)
1961	M	Christoffer Selbeck	Jumping (Discontinued)
1962	M	Oyvind Floystad	Jumping (Discontinued)
1964	M	Erik Jansen	Jumping (Discontinued)
1965	M	Erik Jansen	Jumping (Discontinued)
1969	M	Odd Hammernes	Jumping (Discontinued)
1972	M	Odd Hammernes	Jumping (Discontinued)
1957	M	Harald Riiber	Nordic (Discontinued)
1958	M	Clarence Servold	Nordic (Discontinued)
1959	M	Theodore A. Farwell	Nordic (Discontinued)
1963	M	Aarne Valkama	Nordic (Discontinued)
1964	M	Erik Jansen	Nordic (Discontinued)
1969	M	Georg R. Krog	Nordic (Discontinued)
1954	M	Marvin Crawford	Skimeister (Discontinued)
1956	M	John R. Cress	Skimeister (Discontinued)
1995	F	Narcisa Sehovic	Slalom
1996	F	Roberta Pergher	Slalom
1997	F	Roberat Pergher	Slalom
2000	F	Cecilie Hagen Larsen	Slalom
2004	F	Pia Rivelsrud	Slalom
2011	F	Sterling Grant	Slalom
1996	F	Lisbeth Johnsen	Classical
1999	F	Britta Wienand	Classical
2009	F	Antje Maempel	Classical
2010	F	Antje Maempel	Classical
1996	F	Lisbeth Johnsen	Freestyle
2009	F	Antje Maempel	Freestyle
2010	F	Antje Maempel	Freestyle
2011	F	Ida Dillingoen	Giant Slalom
2012	M	Espen Lysdahl	Slalom

== Denver Skiing Olympic athletes ==
1948 St. Moritz, Switzerland

Donald Johnson (USA) Alva Hiatt (USA) Gordon Wren (USA)

1952 Oslo, Norway

Alvin Wegeman (USA) Keith Wegeman (USA) Willis Olson (USA) Theodore Farwell (USA) Catherine Rudolph (USA)

1956 Cortina, Italy

Marvin Crawford (USA) Willis Olson (USA) Theodore Farwell (USA) Gladys Werner (USA) Catherine Rudolph (USA) Clarence Servold (Canada)

1960 Squaw Valley, California, USA

John R. Cress (USA) Craig M. Lussi (USA) Alfred L. Vincelette (USA) Theodore A. Farwell (USA) Charles T. Ferries (USA) Ansten Samuelstuen (USA) Max S. Marolt (USA) Willy Schaeffler, Coach (USA) Clarence L. Servold (Canada)

1964 Innsbruck, Austria

Charles T. Ferries (USA) Richard G. “Rip” McManus (USA) James E. Shea (USA) Asten Samuelstuen (USA) Jon Terje Øverland (Norway)

1968 Grenoble, France

Fred S. Chaffee II (USA) Georg R. Krog (USA) Dennis M. McCoy (USA) Otto Tschudi (Norway) Mike A. Devecka (USA) Jon Terje Øverland Norway Charles T. Ferries, Coach USA

1972 Sapporo, Japan

Fred S. Chaffee II (USA) Eric J. Poulsen (USA) Otto Tschudi (Norway) Reuben T. Palmer (USA) Terry J. Palmer (USA) Mike A. Devecka (USA) Willy Schaeffler, Coach USA Paul D. Rachetto, Coach USA James E. Shea, Coach USA

1976 Innsbruck, Austria

Odd Hammernes (Norway) Mike A. Devecka (USA) Robert F. Kiesel, Coach USA

1980 Lake Placid, N.Y.

Mike A. Devecka (USA) Robert F. Kiesel, Coach USA Dave Durrance, Coach USA

1984 Sarajevo, Yugoslavia

John McMurtry, Coach USA

1994 Lillehammer, Norway

Jeanette Lunde (Norway)

1998 Nagano, Japan

Andrzej Bachleda (Poland) Sophie Ormond (Great Britain)

2002 Salt Lake City, Utah

Andrzej Bachleda (Poland)

2010 – Vancouver, Canada

Leif Kristian Haugen (Norway)

2014 – Sochi, Russia

Leif Kristian Haugen (Norway) Sebastian Brigovic (Croatia) Trevor Philp (Canada) Andrea Komsic (Croatia)

2018 – PyeongChang, South Korea

Leif Kristian Haugen (Norway) Bronze Medal Erik Read (Canada) Trevor Philp (Canada) Andrea Komsic (Croatia)

== See also ==
- List of NCAA schools with the most NCAA Division I championships
