= List of U.S. collegiate skiing programs =

The following are schools in the United States that field ski programs competing in either the NCAA or the USCSA.

== NCAA Skiing ==
The NCAA holds a single, all-division championship for men, and a single, all-division championship for women.

There are three NCAA affiliated ski conferences: the Central Collegiate Ski Association, Eastern Intercollegiate Ski Association and Rocky Mountain Intercollegiate Ski Association. The conferences consist of Division I, Division II, Division III, and some non-NCAA affiliated teams which compete as guests. There are also some NCAA affiliated teams that are not members of an NCAA ski conference and compete in the USCSA.

=== Central Collegiate Ski Association ===
Note: CCSA only sponsors NCAA Nordic Skiing

==== Division I ====
- University of Wisconsin-Green Bay

==== Division II ====
- Michigan Tech University
- Northern Michigan University
- St Cloud State University

==== Division III ====
- College of Saint Scholastica
- Saint Olaf College

=== Eastern Intercollegiate Ski Association ===
==== Division I ====
- Boston College (Alpine only)
- Dartmouth College
- Harvard University
- University of New Hampshire
- University of Vermont

==== Division II ====
- Saint Michael's College

==== Division III ====
- Bates College
- Bowdoin College (Nordic only)
- Colby College
- Colby-Sawyer (Alpine only)
- Middlebury College
- Plymouth State University (Alpine only)
- St. Lawrence University
- Williams College

=== Rocky Mountain Intercollegiate Ski Association ===
==== Division I ====
- University of Colorado
- University of Denver
- Montana State University
- University of Nevada (Alpine Only)
- University of Utah

==== Division II ====
- University of Alaska Anchorage
- University of Alaska Fairbanks (Nordic only)
- Westminster University (Utah) (Alpine only)

==== Associate Members ====
- Colorado Mountain College (Alpine only)

== United States Collegiate Skiing and Snowboard Association (USCSA) ==
The USCSA sponsors alpine, nordic, freestyle skiing, and snowboarding competitions. Most of these programs are not in the NCAA and range in level of competitiveness. Some are sponsored by the school and are varsity programs, while others are club teams.

USCSA ski programs by conference
Allegheny	Atlantic Highlands	Eastern	Grand Teton	Mideast	Midwest	Northern California	Northwest	Rocky Mountain	Southeast	Southwest
Carnegie Mellon University	Columbia University	Amherst College	Rocky Mountain College	Alfred University†	University of Wisconsin-Madison	California State University Sacramento	Gonzaga University	Colorado Mesa University	Appalachian State University	California State University Long Beach
Pennsylvania State University	Drexel University	Babson College†	University of Utah	Binghamton University	University of Minnesota-Twin Cities	Stanford University	Northwest Nazarene University	Colorado School of Mines	Duke University	Loyola Marymount University
United States Naval Academy	Fairfield University	Boston University	Montana State University	Colgate University	University of Minnesota-Duluth	University of California, Berkeley	The College of Idaho	Colorado State University	East Carolina University	San Diego State University
University of Maryland	Kean University	Bowdoin College		Cornell University	Carleton College	University of California, Davis	University of British Columbia	University of Colorado Boulder	George Mason University	The Claremont Colleges
University of Pittsburgh	La Salle University	Brandeis University		Hamilton College	University of Wisconsin-Eau Claire	University of Nevada	University of Idaho	Western Colorado University	Georgetown University	University of California Los Angeles
Villanova University	Lafayette College	Brown University		Hobart and William Smith Colleges†	St. Olaf College		University of Oregon	United States Air Force Academy	Georgia Institute of Technology	University of California, San Diego
West Virginia University	Lehigh University	Castleton University†		Ithaca College	Michigan Technological University†		University of Puget Sound	Fort Lewis College	James Madison University	University of Southern California
Kutztown University	Moravian University	Clarkson University†		Rensselaer Polytechnic Institute	Northern Michigan University†		University of Washington	University of Wyoming	Lees-McRae College	Arizona State University
	Princeton University	College of the Holy Cross		Rochester Institute of Technology	Michigan State University		Washington State University		North Carolina State University	
	Rutgers University	Connecticut College		Skidmore College	Calvin University		Whitman College		University of North Carolina at Chapel Hill	
	Stevens Institute of Technology	Marist University		St. Bonaventure University	University of Notre Dame				University of North Carolina at Charlotte	
	United States Military Academy	Massachusetts Institute of Technology		St. John Fisher University	St. Mary's University of Minnesota				University of Virginia	
	University of Pennsylvania	New England College†		State University of New York at Albany	University of Michigan				Virginia Tech	
		Northeastern University		State University of New York Geneseo	Central Michigan University				Washington and Lee University	
		Paul Smith's College		Syracuse University	The Ohio State University				Western Carolina University	
		Roger Williams College		University of Rochester	Grand Valley State University					
		Saint Anselm College			University of Wisconsin-Stout					
		Smith College			Northwestern University					
		St. Joseph's College of Maine†								
		Trinity College								
		Tufts University								
		United States Coast Guard Academy								
		University of Connecticut								
		University of Maine								
		University of Maine at Farmington								
		University of Massachusetts Amherst								
		University of Rhode Island								
		Vassar College								
		Wellesley College								
		Wesleyan University								
		Worcester Polytechnic Institute								
		Yale University								

† School sponsors team as a varsity NCAA skiing program, but competes in USCSA.
