= Wyoming Cowboys and Cowgirls =

Athletic teams of the University of Wyoming

- University: University of Wyoming
- Nickname: Cowboys, Cowgirls
- NCAA: Division I (FBS)
- Conference: Mountain West (primary); WAC (men's swimming & diving); Big 12 (wrestling)
- Athletic director: Tom Burman
- Location: Laramie, Wyoming
- Varsity teams: 17 (8 men's and 9 women's)
- Football stadium: War Memorial Stadium
- Basketball arena: Arena-Auditorium
- Soccer stadium: Madrid Sports Complex
- Other venues: Jacoby Golf Course; John Corbett Building; UniWyo Sports Complex; UW Tennis Complex; War Memorial Fieldhouse
- Colors: Brown and gold
- Mascot: Cowboy Joe (live pony) and Pistol Pete (costumed student)
- Fight song: Ragtime Cowboy Joe and Fight, Wyoming, Fight!
- Website: gowyo.com
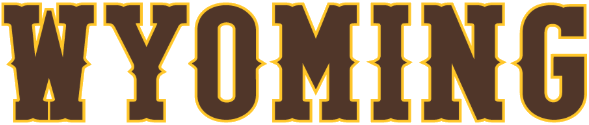

Team NCAA championships
- 3

Individual and relay NCAA champions
- 23

The Wyoming Cowboys and Cowgirls are the athletic teams that represent the University of Wyoming, located in Laramie. Wyoming is a member of the Mountain West Conference (MW) and competes in NCAA Division I, fielding 17 NCAA-sanctioned sports. Two Wyoming teams compete in other conferences in sports that the MW does not sponsor. The men's swimming and diving team competes in the Western Athletic Conference, and the wrestling team competes in the Big 12 Conference.

Tom Burman has served as Wyoming's athletic director since October 9, 2006.

== History ==
=== Nickname ===
The nickname Cowboys was used as early as 1891 when a cowboy assisted the Wyoming football team against a team from Cheyenne, Wyoming. One of the Cheyenne players allegedly yelled "Hey, look at that cowboy," and the name stuck.

=== Mascots ===
Wyoming's mascot is "Pistol Pete" (first seen in 1917 and redesigned in 2002), a student dressed up like a cowboy. UW Athletics also features "Cowboy Joe", a pony primarily present at football games. Pistol Pete roams the sidelines and stands entertaining fans. The athletic teams are cheered on by the school song "Ragtime Cowboy Joe" and the fight song "Fight, Wyoming, Fight". Men's athletic teams are known as "Cowboys" and women's teams are called "Cowgirls". Teams of either gender are also referred to as "Pokes", short for Cowpokes.

== Sports sponsored ==
| Men's sports | Women's sports |
|---|---|
| Basketball | Basketball |
| Cross country | Cross country |
| Football | Golf |
| Golf | Soccer |
| Swimming and diving | Swimming and diving |
| Track and field^{†} | Tennis |
| Wrestling | Track and field^{†} |
| | Volleyball |
† – Track and field includes both indoor and outdoor.

=== Football ===
Wyoming is a member of the Mountain West Conference

Football began in 1893 at UW, and games were played against local high schools and Front Range colleges. War Memorial Stadium was built in 1950 with an original capacity of 20,000 fans. The stadium sits at 7,200 feet (2,200 m) above sea level, and is the highest Division I football stadium in the United States. Currently the stadium holds 30,514 fans. The Wyoming Cowboys rival is Colorado State. Wyoming and Colorado State meet annually in the Border War; the winner receives the Bronze Boot trophy. The boot was worn by a member of the Colorado State ROTC during the Vietnam War. Wyoming beat Colorado State 42–0 in 2010 for the most lopsided outcome in the 102 games of the rivalry up to that point.

In 2004, the Cowboy football team ended a 38-year bowl game victory drought by defeating the UCLA Bruins in the Las Vegas Bowl on December 23, 2004. In 2009, the team defeated Fresno State, 35–28 in double overtime, in the New Mexico Bowl. Kelly Haggbberg made the winning tackle.

The football helmets were chosen as the third best logo helmet (no letters) by Sports Illustrated's 10 Spot.

=== Men's basketball ===
In 1943, the team defeated Georgetown University 46–34 to win the NCAA Men's Division I Basketball Championship. Two days following its NCAA Championship, Wyoming was asked to play the 1943 National Invitation Tournament Champion (NIT), St. John's, in a game to benefit the Red Cross and raise money for the country's war effort. Wyoming defeated St. John's, 52–47, in New York City's Madison Square Garden. Kenny Sailors was the national MVP that year. He is credited with creation of the shot known today as the jump shot. When Sailors went to the NBA, his coaches told him he could never be successful in the game if he didn't learn to shoot with his feet on the ground. Sailors created the jump shot in his youth on his family farm in Hillsdale, Wyoming, during pickup games with an older brother, who was considerably taller than Kenny.

Fennis Dembo was a popular player in the mid-1980s. He led the Cowboys back to Madison Square Garden in 1986, as they advanced to the semifinals of the 1986 NIT. UW defeated Florida (67–58) in the semifinals before losing to Ohio State (73–63) in the championship game. Dembo also helped lead Wyoming to the Sweet 16 of the 1987 NCAA Tournament, defeating Virginia (64–60) and UCLA (78–68) in the first and second rounds before losing to UNLV (92-78) in the West Regional semifinals. Wyoming also made the NCAA Tournament in 2002 as a #11 seed, defeating #6 Gonzaga (73–66) before losing to #3 Arizona (68–60). Wyoming then won the Mountain West Basketball tournament for the first time in 2015 and returned to the NCAA tournament, losing to Northern Iowa 71–54 as a #12 seed. In 2006, Street & Smith's published its “Greatest College Basketball Programs of All-Time," ranking the University of Wyoming's men's basketball program 42nd.

=== Women's basketball ===
The Women's basketball team hosted and won the 2006–2007 WNIT (Women's National Invitation Tournament) after not receiving a bid in the 2006–2007 NCAA Tournament. The Cowgirls set many WNIT records, including second-largest crowd attendance for the tournament (behind the UNM) and the second highest championship game attendance (second again to New Mexico). During that win against Wisconsin the attendance record for the Arena-Auditorium was tied, as tickets were sold out in under four hours. The Cowgirls finished with a 27–9 overall record and 11–5 in the Mountain West Conference. They also finished second among Division I institutions with one of the largest increases from the previous season. They averaged 1,699 fans during the 2005–06 season compared to 4,638 during the 2006–07 Season. They also ranked 22nd in attendance for the 2006–07 season.

In 2008, the Cowgirls finished the season with a 24–7 record overall, 12–4 in conference play. After losing in the first round of the Mountain West Conference tournament, the Cowgirls received an-at large bid for the NCAA tournament for the first time. They lost in the first round to Pittsburgh, 63-58.

=== Swimming ===
University of Wyoming athletics has been represented on the Olympic stage by swimmer Scott Usher. Usher was a member of the University of Wyoming Men's Swimming and Diving team from 2000 to 2004 where he was a five-time NCAA All-American and six-time Mountain West Conference individual champion and record holder. In 2004 he qualified for the Athens Olympic Games in the 200 breast stroke and missed qualifying in the 100 breast stroke by .29 of a second. At the Athens Olympics, the Nebraska native finished seventh in the 200 breast stroke. He was named to the 2007 U.S. World Championship Team. The MW no longer sponsors men's swimming and diving; the Cowboys team in that sport now competes in the Western Athletic Conference. The Cowgirls still compete in the Mountain West Conference.

=== Wrestling ===
The Wyoming Cowboy wrestling team competes in the Big 12 Conference, as the Mountain West does not sponsor the sport. From 2006 through 2015, the Cowboys competed in the Western Wrestling Conference, but that league disbanded at the end of the 2014–15 school year when all of its members accepted wrestling-only membership in the Big 12. Mark Branch was first hired in 2009. The team found more success under Branch in 2012–13, finishing 23rd at the NCAA Championships thanks to seven NCAA qualifiers and two All-Americans. Milestones for the program under Branch include first-time wins over Cal Poly and Oklahoma in 2012, and being named a top-25 academic program by the National Wrestling Coaches Association in 2013. The Cowboy wrestlers compete on campus at the UniWyo Sports Complex, which has a capacity of 1,200.

In his first ten years as head coach, Branch had a 100–49 record. He was named the Big 12 Wrestling Coach of the Year in 2018.

University of Wyoming Cowboy Wrestling team accomplishments:

- Mountain States Conference Championships: 5 (1950, 1951, 1952, 1953, 1955)
- Skyline Conference Championships: 7 (1956, 1957, 1958, 1959, 1960, 1961, 1962)
- Western Athletic Conference Championships: 7 (1964, 1983, 1985, 1986, 1988, 1990, 1992)
- Western Wrestling Conference: 3

== Championships ==
=== NCAA team championships ===
Wyoming has won three NCAA team national championships.

- Men's (2)
  - Basketball (1): 1943
  - Skiing (1): 1968
- Co-ed (1)
  - Skiing (1): 1985
- see also:
  - Mountain West Conference NCAA team championships
  - List of NCAA schools with the most NCAA Division I championships

=== Other national team championships ===
Below is one national team title that was not bestowed by the NCAA:

- Women's
  - Basketball (1): 2007 (WNIT)

== Club sports ==
UW Club Sports include soccer, rugby, rodeo, skiing, ice hockey and a number of other club sports on campus.

=== Men's rugby ===
The UW rugby union was founded in 1972. The team competes in USA Rugby's Division I-A College Rugby West Division and is a member of the Eastern Rockies Rugby Football Union (ERRFU), along with Colorado State, Colorado, Utah, New Mexico and Air Force. The team competes against scholarship teams such as University of California at Berkeley and BYU Rugby and regularly advances to the national tournament. In 2000, it was runner-up to UC–Berkeley. In 1991 and 2002, it placed fourth in the nation. In 2014, Wyoming Rugby ranked eleventh in Canterbury's DI-A Top 20 ranking and advanced to the playoffs against Cal Poly.

=== Women's rugby ===
The University of Wyoming women's rugby team, known as Wyoming Women's Cowgirls Rugby Club, started in 1985. The Cowgirls rugby team competes in USA Rugby's Women's Division II and plays in the Eastern Rockies Region. As a member of the Eastern Rockies Rugby Football Union (ERRFU), its opponents include Adams State University, Colorado College, Colorado School of Mines, University of Denver, Idaho State University, Mesa, Montana State University, University of New Mexico, University of Northern Colorado, Utah State University, Utah Valley University and Weber State.

The team advanced to its first regional tournament in 2007, where it finished in third place in the union and fourth place in the West Rugby Conference. The women's rugby team's reached the Emirates Airline USA Rugby Women's National Division II tournament in 2012. The Cowgirls beat Humboldt State in the "Sweet 16" round and lost to Washington State University in the "Elite 8".

=== National championships ===
- Hockey (1): 2001

== Traditions ==
Wyoming's school song is Ragtime Cowboy Joe, and the fight song is Fight, Wyoming, Fight!, played by the Western Thunder Marching Band and UW Pep Band. In football and basketball, the school song and fight song are sung throughout the game in whole or in part, including when the team runs on the field or court, at timeouts, and after points are scored.

During football games, a cannon behind the south end zone is fired by UW Army ROTC Cadets every time a point is scored. When the football team runs from the RAC locker room to Jonah Field, each member touches the Steamboat bronze statue for good luck. During basketball games, a short riff is played by the drum set and bass players after every point scored.

The Beer Song is also a long-standing tradition at Wyoming; students will chant "Beer Song" at every home game until the band has performed the song several times.

== Facilities ==
=== Jonah Field at War Memorial Stadium ===
Jonah Field at War Memorial Stadium, capacity 30,514, was built in 1950. The playing field is at an elevation of 7,220 feet (2200m), the highest in Division I football. The natural grass field was replaced by artificial turf in 2005. The new surface, known as Desso Challenge Pro 60 Monofilament Synthetic Turf, is the first of its kind in Division I.

Near the north end zone is a bronze statue depicting the Steamboat and rider logo. At the beginning of the game and at halftime, the team runs from the locker room in the RAC to the field and the statue is touched as a token of good luck.

=== Arena-Auditorium ===
Built in 1982 at a cost of $15 million, the Arena-Auditorium commonly called the AA (or "Dome of Doom") seats over 15,000. It has been home to the Cowboys since its opening, and to the Cowgirls since 2003. In the yard outside the AA is a statue named "Fanning a Twister." The statue depicts a cowboy on top of a bucking bronco, similar to the sports logo.

=== UniWyo Sports Complex ===
The UniWyo Sports Complex is the facility for Cowboys wrestling and Cowgirls volleyball, and was also home to the Cowgirls basketball team before it moved into the Arena-Auditorium in 2003. The seating capacity is approximately 1,200 people. It is situated north of the Field House, south of the Arena-Auditorium, and northwest of War Memorial Stadium. Formerly called the Multi-Purpose Gymnasium, it was renamed in 2005 to the UniWyo Sports Complex after a $1 million gift from UniWyo Federal Credit Union, the largest credit union in Laramie and the third largest in Wyoming.

=== Rochelle Athletics Center ===
The Rochelle Athletics Center, commonly called the RAC (pronounced "Rack"), opened its doors on August 31, 2001. It is the training facility for all varsity sports. It also contains the football locker room, an academic and counseling center, and a sports medicine facility. The RAC began construction May 2000, and was completed at a cost of $9.4 million. The building was named for Curtis and Marian Rochelle, who donated $4.2 million to the University of Wyoming for the construction of the facility.

=== Jonah Field and indoor practice facility ===
The playing surface at War Memorial Stadium was named Jonah Field at War Memorial Stadium in 2005 after a new $1 million artificial playing surface was installed. Construction on the new Indoor Practice Facility (also called the IPF) began in the fall of 2006. It is located northeast of War Memorial Stadium and contains over 80,000 square feet (7,400 m^{2}), and includes a full-size, 100-yard by 50-yard, football field covered by the same Desso Challenge Pro 60 artificial surface that was installed on Jonah Field. The landscaped Warburton Plaza area is located between the RAC and IPF.

The IPF was completed at the end of 2007 at a cost of $11 million, paid for in part by private donations and matching funds from the Wyoming State Legislature. Major donors included the John and Mari Ann Martin family and the Mick and Susie McMurry family, who combined to donate $5 million to the projects. The new surface was named Jonah Field to recognize the prolific natural gas field in Sublette County, as well as the financial contributions by Wyoming's extractive industries to state funding projects, including higher education. Gifts totaling $2 million by George and Dianna Archuleta of La Barge and Ron and Linda Flack of Cheyenne launched UW's Intercollegiate Athletics capital campaign for facilities in March 2004.

=== Glenn "Red" Jacoby Golf Club ===
Named after the University of Wyoming Athletics Director Glenn "Red" Jacoby (1946–73), the Jacoby golf course is one of two golf courses in Laramie, Wyoming. The course measures 6,855 yards and is located just east of the University of Wyoming campus. It is home to the university's men's and women's golf teams and also open to the public. The University of Wyoming Physical Plant maintains upkeep on the course.

=== Other facilities and improvements ===
The Wildcatter Stadium Club & Suites on the east side of War Memorial Stadium was completed in 2010. A $2.75 million, four-court indoor tennis complex followed in 2011.
