= United States Collegiate Ski and Snowboard Association =

United States Collegiate Ski and Snowboard Association (USCSA)
- Most recent season or competition: 2024
- Sport: Skiing & Snowboarding
- Director: Meegan Moszynski
- President: Bo Bigelow
- No. of teams: >450
- Country: United States
- Continent: North America
- Most recent champions: Alpine - Vermont State University - Castleton (Men), Rocky Mountain College (Women) FreeSki - Liberty University (Men), The Claremont Colleges (Women) Nordic - Clarkson University (Men), St. Olaf (Women) Snowboard Alpine - Lees-McRae College (Men & Women) Snowboard Freestyle - Liberty University (Men & Women)
- Sponsors: Celsius, IKON Pass, Borah Teamwear, Sync Performance, ACL Strong, Curated
- Website: https://www.uscsa.org/

The United States Collegiate Ski and Snowboard Association (USCSA) is the sports federation for collegiate skiing and snowboarding in the United States. With over 180 member colleges, the USCSA fields some 5,000 men and women, alpine, Nordic, freeski and snowboard athletes in over 200 competitive events annually. The organization offers alpine skiing, Nordic skiing, freestyle skiing and snowboarding.

== Mission ==
"To be the national governing body of collegiate team ski and snowboard competition in the United States; to promote and increase awareness of and participation in alpine skiing, Nordic skiing, free skiing and snowboarding; and to provide competition and development opportunities for student athletes in a team atmosphere leading toward National titles in each discipline."

== Overview ==
The United States Collegiate Ski & Snowboard Association is a sports federation for collegiate team ski racing and snowboarding in America. You can be part of a team at any college in the United States. The USCSA has an alpine, Nordic, snowboard, freeski or ski jumping collegiate competition programs available. If a college does not have a team, students can start one with the help of the organization.

The USCSA asserts that student-athletes, of ALL levels and abilities, should have access to a quality and exciting venue of competition. The organization also recognizes "student" comes before "athlete" and for its members to be successful individuals, academics should take priority.

== Organization Structure ==
Competition takes place across three progressive tiers. Conference qualifiers determine the participants at the six USCSA regional championships. The Regional Championships are the last step on the road to the annual United States Collegiate Ski and Snowboard National Championship, the showcase event in college snowsports competition. The USCSA National Championships sees over 450 athletes, participating for more than 40 schools.

== Conferences By Region with Current Conference Coordinators ==
- Far West Region: Northern California (Alec Tandara-Kuhns) and Southwest (Patrick Wilcox) Conferences
- West Region: Northwest (Ron Bonneau), Rocky Mountain (Nick LaBue) and Grand Teton (Jerry Wolf) Conferences
- Midwest Region: Midwest Conference (Robin Dzubay)
- Eastern Region: Eastern Conference (Chris Eder)
- Mid-Atlantic Region: Allegheny (Sarah Geiger), Southeast (Doug Grayson) and Atlantic Highlands (Corey Tolkin) Conferences
- New York Region: Mideast Conference (Jim Longo)
