= Mount Doublehead =

Mountain in New Hampshire, United States

Mount Doublehead (north peak)
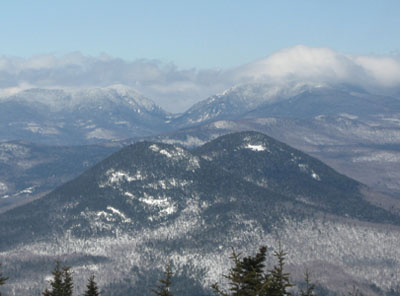

Highest point
- Elevation: 3,053 ft (931 m)
- Prominence: 960 ft (290 m)
- Coordinates: 44°10.06′N 71°7.80′W

Geography
- Location: Carroll County, New Hampshire, U.S.
- Parent range: White Mountains
- Topo map: USGS Jackson

Mount Doublehead is a twin-peaked mountain in eastern New Hampshire, United States. It is located in the town of Jackson, Carroll County, in the eastern White Mountains. North Doublehead has an elevation of 3,053 feet (930.5 m) above sea level, while South Doublehead has an elevation of 2,939 ft (895.8 m).

Doublehead stands within the watershed of the Saco River, which drains into the Gulf of Maine. The eastern and southern slopes of Doublehead drain into the East Branch of the Saco River. The northwest side of Doublehead drains into Great Brook, thence into Wildcat Brook, the Ellis River, and into the Saco.

In 1934, the American composer Alan Hovhaness (1911–2000), who frequently climbed the White Mountains during his youth, wrote a composition for piano entitled Fog on Mount Double Head (Op. 1, no. 2).

South of the White Mountains, Doublehead Mountain (elevation 2,158 ft/657.8 m) is found in Sandwich, New Hampshire (also in Carroll County), in the Squam Mountains overlooking Squam Lake.
