= East Fork East Branch Saco River =

- Location within New Hampshire Location within the United States

Location
- Country: United States
- State: New Hampshire
- Counties: Coos, Carroll
- Towns: Beans Purchase, Jackson

Physical characteristics
- Source: North Baldface
  - location: Beans Purchase
  - coordinates: 44°14′22″N 71°5′33″W
  - elevation: 2,900 ft (880 m)
- Mouth: East Branch Saco River
  - location: Jackson
  - coordinates: 44°12′55″N 71°7′26″W
  - elevation: 1,960 ft (600 m)
- Length: 2.2 mi (3.5 km)

The East Fork of the East Branch of the Saco River is a 2.2-mile-long (3.5 km) stream in the White Mountains of New Hampshire in the United States. It is a tributary of the East Branch of the Saco River, with its waters ultimately flowing to the Atlantic Ocean in Maine.

The East Fork rises on the western slopes of North and South Baldface, two rocky summits that each stand over 3,500 feet (1,100 m) above sea level, in the eastern part of the White Mountain National Forest. The stream flows south, entering the town of Jackson, and joins the East Branch of the Saco in a broad valley between Sable Mountain to the east and Black Mountain to the west.

== See also ==
- List of rivers of New Hampshire
