= Bald face =

Bald face or Baldface may refer to:

- a variety of horse marking
- Baldface-Royce Range, a mountain range in western Maine and eastern New Hampshire, U.S.
- Baldface Mountain, British Columbia, Canada
- North Baldface a mountain in New Hampshire, U.S.
- South Baldface a mountain in New Hampshire, U.S.

== See also ==
- Bald-faced hornet
- Blue-faced rail or bald-faced rail, a bird
