= Baldface-Royce Range =

Mountain range in Maine and New Hampshire, United States

Coordinates: 44°14′34″N 71°05′13″W

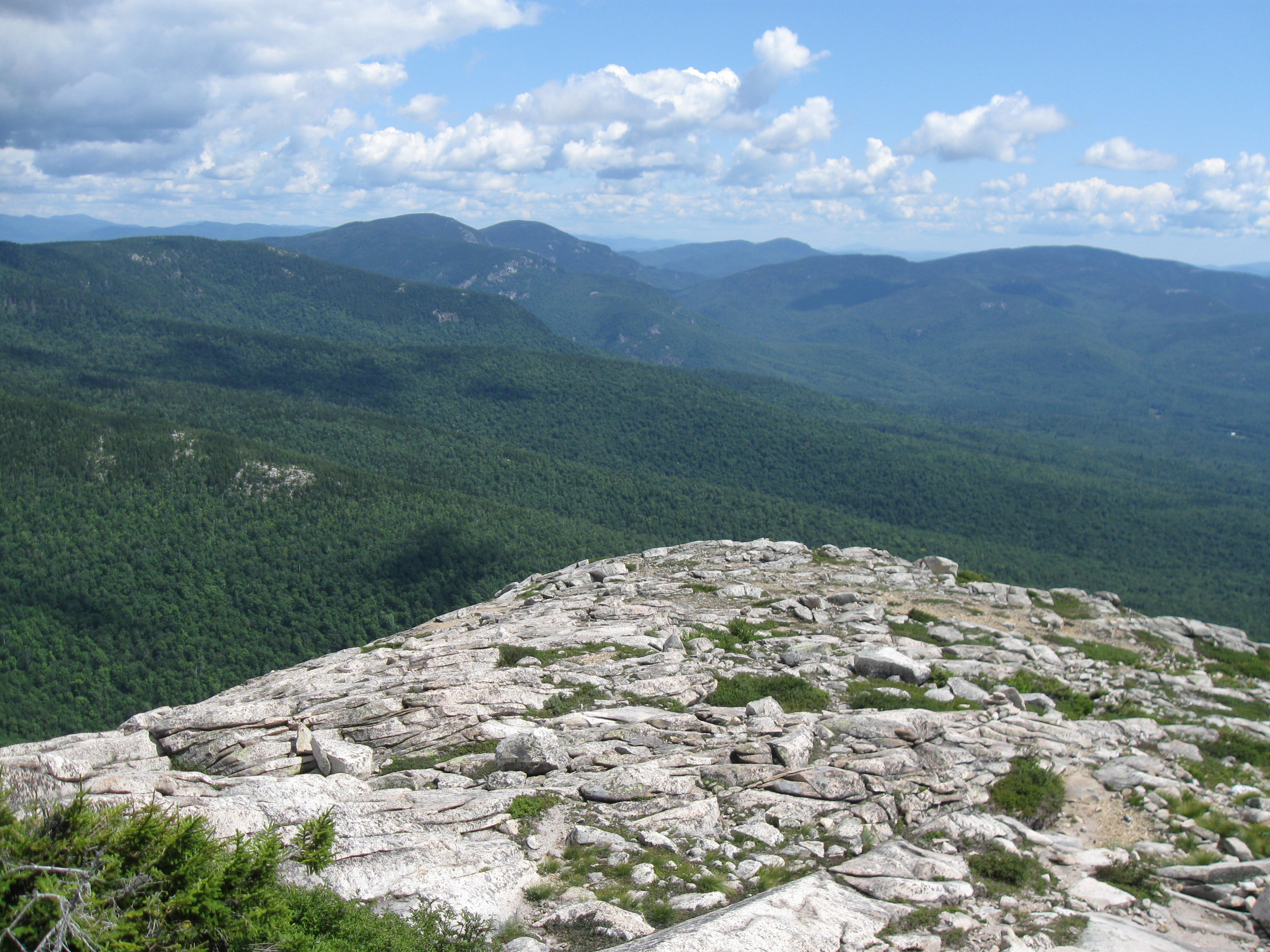
Royce Mountain (West and East) from South Baldface

The Baldface-Royce Range is a range of mountains in western Maine and eastern New Hampshire, in the United States. They are located in the town of Chatham, New Hampshire, and the townships of Bean's Purchase, New Hampshire, and Batchelders Grant, Maine, in the eastern part of the White Mountains.

== Mountains in the Baldface-Royce range ==
From south to north:

- Eastman Mountain, 2,939 feet (896 m), ascended by the Eastman Mountain Trail from the Slippery Brook Trail
- South Baldface, 3,547 feet (1,081 m), ascended by the Baldface Circle Trail
- North Baldface, 3,606 feet (1,099 m), ascended by the Baldface Circle Trail and Bicknell Ridge Trail
- Mount Meader, 2,782 feet (848 m), ascended by the Mount Meader Trail, Basin Rim Trail and Meader Ridge Trail
- West Royce Mountain, 3,200 feet (980 m), ascended by the Royce Trail, Burnt Mill Brook Trail, and Basin Rim Trail
- East Royce Mountain, 3,114 feet (949 m), ascended by the Royce Trail, East Royce Trail, Laughing Lion Trail, and Burnt Mill Brook Trail

== See also ==
- Speckled Mountain, located east of the Baldface-Royce Range in Maine
- Wild River (Androscoggin River), forming the valley to the northwest of the range
