= Honeymoon Bridge (New Hampshire) =

Honeymoon Bridge (Jackson, NH)
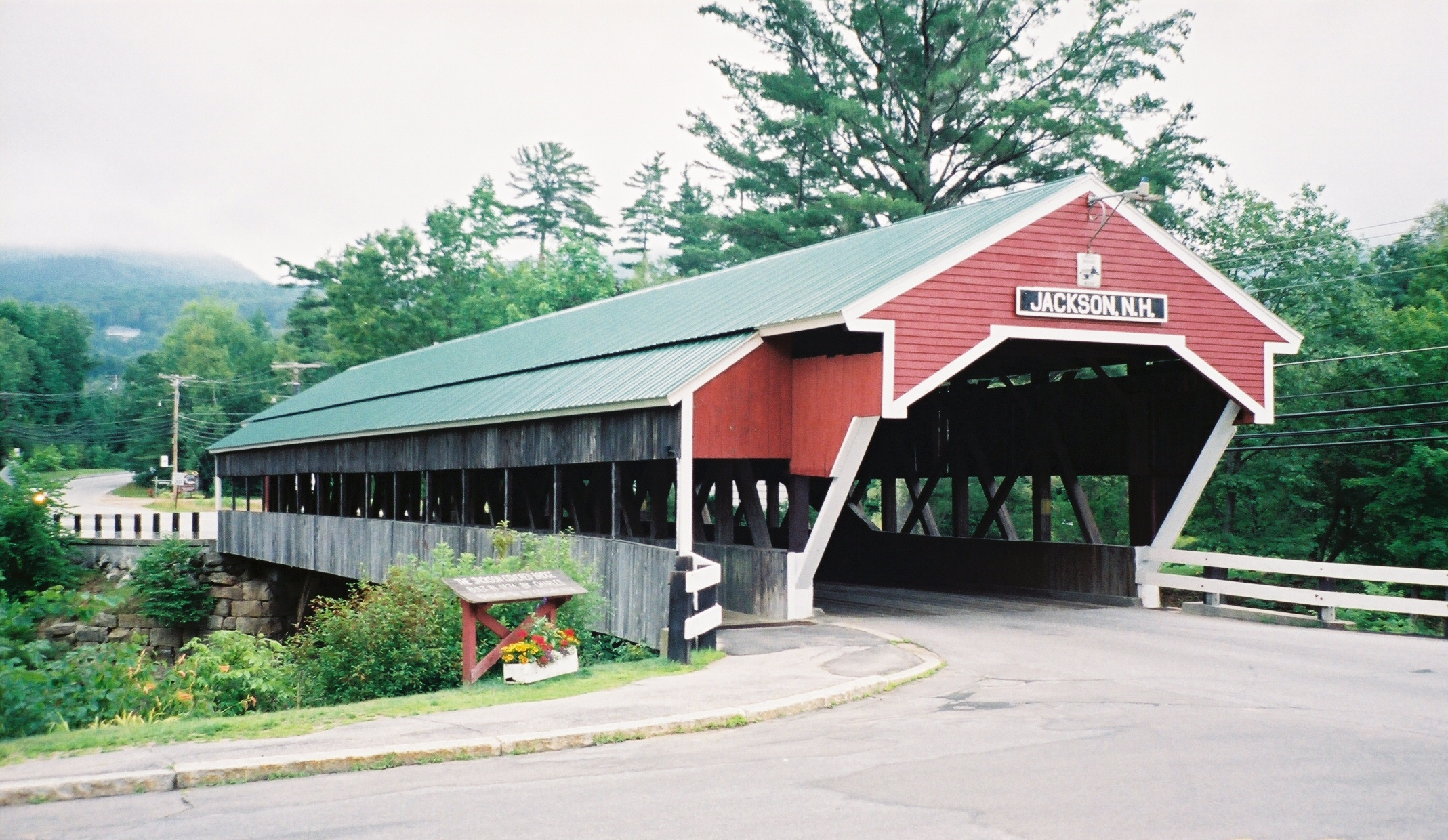
- Honeymoon Bridge in 2001
- Coordinates: 44°8′30″N 71°11′11″W
- Carries: Village Street
- Crosses: Ellis River
- Locale: Jackson, New Hampshire
- Maintained by: NH DOT

Characteristics
- Design: Wooden Paddleford Burr Truss
- Total length: 121 ft (37 m)
- Width: 26.5 ft (8.1 m)
- No. of spans: One (121 ft (37 m))

History
- Designer: Charles Austin Broughton and his son Frank
- Construction start: Unknown
- Construction end: 1876
- Opened: 1876

Statistics
- Toll: None

Honeymoon Bridge (also known as Covered Bridge No. 51) is a wooden covered bridge over the Ellis River in Jackson, New Hampshire, United States.

== History ==
In 1873, town residents debated whether to build and/or repair at least two bridges that crossed the Wildcat River. Honeymoon Bridge was built in 1876, just south of the confluence of the Wildcat with the Ellis River, by Charles Austin Broughton and his son Frank. The Broughton family owned a dairy farm on the east side of the Saco River. Serving in the Civil War, Charles had carpentry skills needed to do the work. In 1899, the town of Jackson paid the Goodrich Falls Electric Company to illuminate the bridge. The sidewalk on the side of the bridge was added in 1930 according to town records, and improvements were done in 1965 to improve visibility and provide parking. In 2001 the bridge received a US$64,000 grant that provided for the installation of a fire protection system that included sprinklers, among other things. Further rehabilitation of the bridge was completed three years later. Today, Honeymoon Bridge is an often-photographed tourist attraction.

Honeymoon Bridge is one of 20 examples of the Paddleford truss design. The bridge was nicknamed "Honeymoon" bridge from the tradition of lovers kissing under it for good luck. The name dates to at least 1936, with bridge historian Adelbert M. Jakeman possibly giving the bridge its nickname. Honeymoon Bridge is designated as Covered Bridge 51 by the state.

== See also ==
- Honeymoon Bridge (ON, Canada), a bridge in Ontario with the same name (collapsed in 1938)
- List of bridges documented by the Historic American Engineering Record in New Hampshire
- List of New Hampshire covered bridges
