= East Branch Saco River =

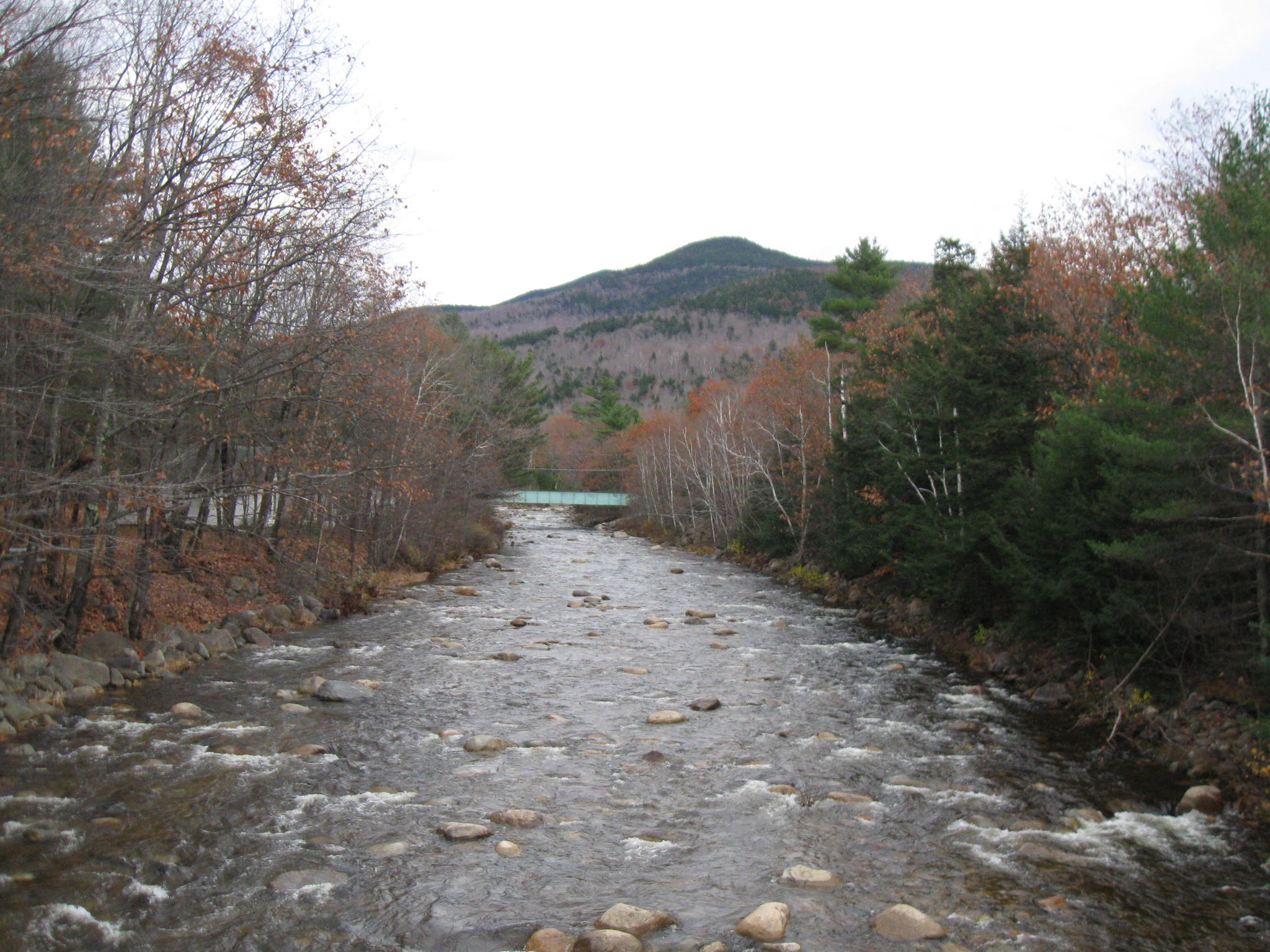
- East Branch Saco River in Bartlett, New Hampshire

- Location within New Hampshire Location within the United States

Location
- Country: United States
- State: New Hampshire
- County: Carroll
- Towns: Jackson, Bartlett

Physical characteristics
- Source
  - location: Jackson
  - coordinates: 44°14′6″N 71°7′31″W
  - elevation: 2,130 ft (650 m)
- Mouth: Saco River
  - location: Bartlett
  - coordinates: 44°5′42″N 71°9′51″W
  - elevation: 505 ft (154 m)
- Length: 13.2 mi (21.2 km)

Basin features
- Tributaries
  - left: East Fork, Slippery Brook

The East Branch of the Saco River is a 13.2-mile-long (21.2 km) river in the White Mountains of New Hampshire in the United States. It is a tributary of the Saco River, which flows to the Atlantic Ocean in Maine.

The East Branch rises near the northern boundary of Jackson, New Hampshire, in an area just south of the Wild River, east of Black Mountain Ski Area, and southwest of the Baldface mountains. The river flows south through the White Mountain National Forest in an area that is devoted more to logging than other portions of the forest. Leaving the forest, the river enters the town of Bartlett, reaching the Saco River at Lower Bartlett village, just downstream of the Ellis River confluence with the Saco.

== See also ==
- List of rivers of New Hampshire
