= Wild River Wilderness =

Wilderness area in New Hampshire, United States

- IUCN category Ib (wilderness area)
- Location within the United States
- Location: Coos County, New Hampshire, USA
- Nearest city: Gorham, New Hampshire
- Coordinates: 44°17′N 71°06′W
- Area: 24,032 acres (9,725 ha)
- Established: 2006
- Governing body: United States Forest Service

The Wild River Wilderness is one of six wilderness areas in the White Mountain National Forest in the U.S. state of New Hampshire. The wilderness is located primarily in unincorporated Bean's Purchase, New Hampshire, near the Maine border, and is managed by the U.S. Forest Service. Within the wilderness's 24,032 acres (97.25 km^{2}) are 29.7 miles (47.8 km) of hiking trails. The highest point in the area is Carter Dome. The New England Wilderness Act of 2006 created the area.

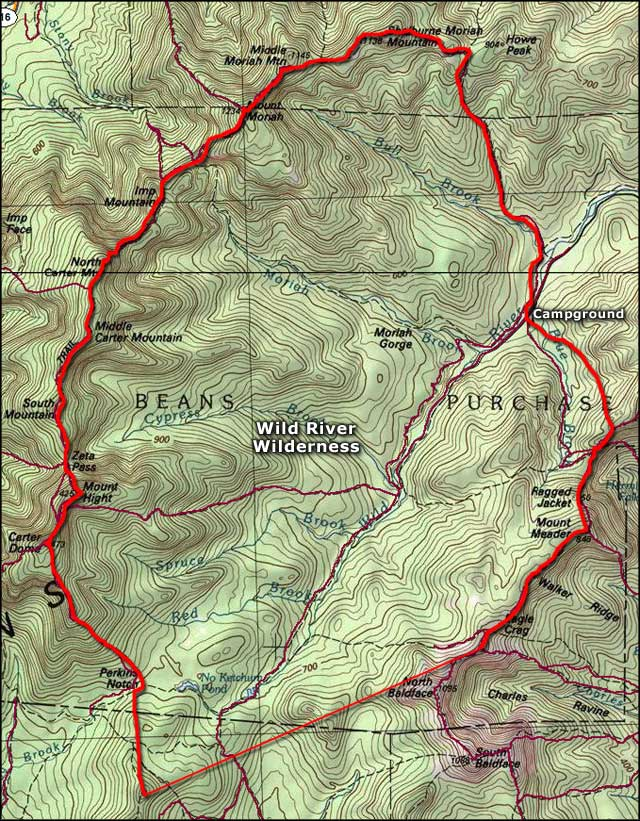
A topographic map of New Hampshire's Wild River Wilderness

== History ==
Before 1800, the area was mostly pristine old-growth forest and had only a few inhabitants. Over the course of the 19th century, a rail line was built up the valley, reaching from the Androscoggin River to the headwaters of the Wild River. Logging camps prospered along the river, and by the turn of the 20th century nearly all accessible timber had been removed. In 1903, a severe drought year, campers fishing for brook trout at No Ketchum Pond left a campfire unattended. Slash left over from recent logging operations provided ample fuel, and the campfire sparked a large wildfire. This, combined with flooding from the river, wiped out the remaining timber business. In March 1914, the U.S. Forest Service purchased 41,000 acres (170 km^{2}) of land from the Hastings Lumber Company for inclusion in the White Mountain National Forest, part of which would later become the Wild River Wilderness.

== Recreation ==
Visitors to the wilderness can view a forest that has largely reclaimed the land after a short period of human industry. Scattered throughout the area are various artifacts of the logging era. The main access to the wilderness is via the Wild River Trail, which climbs the grade of the old railroad to No Ketchum Pond. From this hub, trails branch off into the rugged mountains in the western portion of the wilderness. The Appalachian Trail follows the ridge of the Carter-Moriah Range, which marks the western boundary of the preserve.

The main trailhead is the Wild River Campground, a small, rustic campground run by the Forest Service. The campground is located at the end of a dirt road just outside the eastern border of the wilderness. Activities in the wilderness include hiking, fishing, hunting, and climbing.

== Flora and fauna ==
The diverse wildlife of the forest include large mammals such as moose, whitetail deer, and black bear. Smaller animals include pine marten, red squirrels, and snowshoe hare. The lower elevations are dominated by hardwoods, including the New Hampshire state tree, the white birch. Spruce and fir, which grew back after the 1903 fires, cover the higher areas. The very highest elevations of Carter Dome are above the tree line and feature subalpine vegetation.

== See also ==
- List of largest wilderness areas in the United States
- List of wilderness areas of the United States
- National Wilderness Preservation System
- New Hampshire historical marker no. 284: Betty Brook
- Wilderness Act
