= Jackson Falls National Register Historic District =

Historic district in New Hampshire, United States

- U.S. National Register of Historic Places
- U.S. Historic district
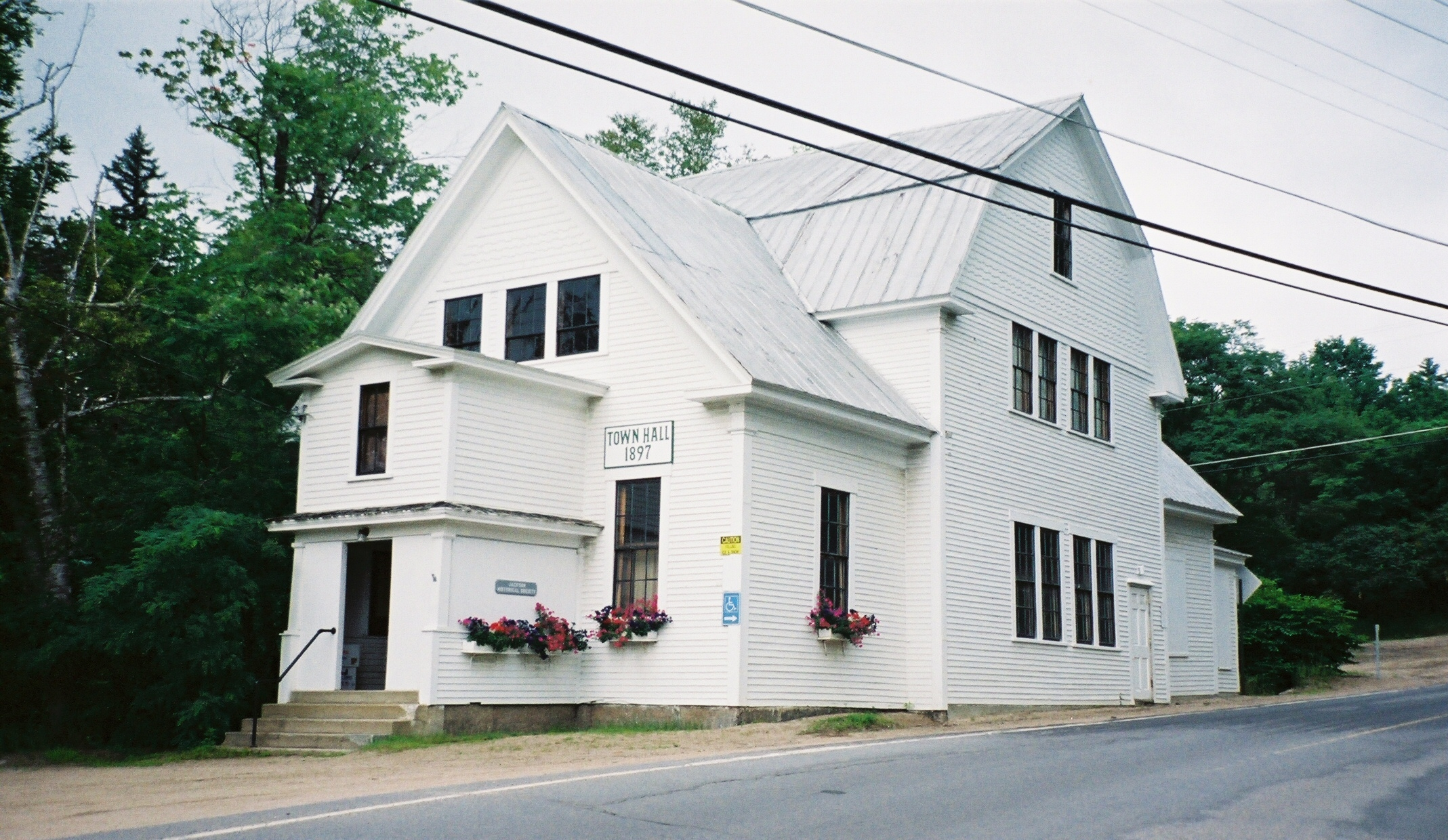
- Old Town Hall

- Location within New Hampshire Location within the United States
- Location: Jackson, New Hampshire
- Coordinates: 44°8′52″N 71°10′51″W
- Area: 23 acres (9.3 ha)
- Built: 1846
- Architect: Bates, William; Emerson, William Ralph
- Architectural style: Greek Revival, Late Victorian
- NRHP reference No.: 03000110
- Added to NRHP: March 12, 2003

The Jackson Falls National Register Historic District encompasses the historic village center of Jackson, New Hampshire. It consists of a cluster of buildings centered on the crossing of Jackson Village Road over the Wildcat River, extending on both sides of the river along Five Mile Circuit Road (a.k.a. Black Mountain Road) and Carter Notch Road, both of which are part of New Hampshire Route 16B. Most of the properties in the district were built between the 1860s and the 1930s, and are reflective of the community's growth as a summer resort area. The district was listed on the National Register of Historic Places in 2003.

== Description and history ==
The town of Jackson was first settled in the 1770s, and was incorporated as "Adams" in 1800; it was renamed Jackson in 1828, after President Andrew Jackson. At first agricultural in nature, the area's scenic beauty began to draw artists and tourists. By the late 1840s a small tourist industry had arisen. Larger hotels began to be built in Jackson in the 1860s, with further growth spurred by completion of the Portland and Ogdensburg Railroad in the 1870s. The village center of Jackson Falls experienced its largest period of growth between 1880 and the 1930s.

The village of Jackson Falls consists of a mix of civic, religious, commercial, and private residential buildings. The most prominent building is probably the Wentworth Castle, which is on the hillside above the Wentworth Hall resort hotel complex. Completed in 1891, it was designed by New York architect William Bates. The district also includes Jackson's 1901 library building, old (1897) town hall, and a community church built in 1846–47.

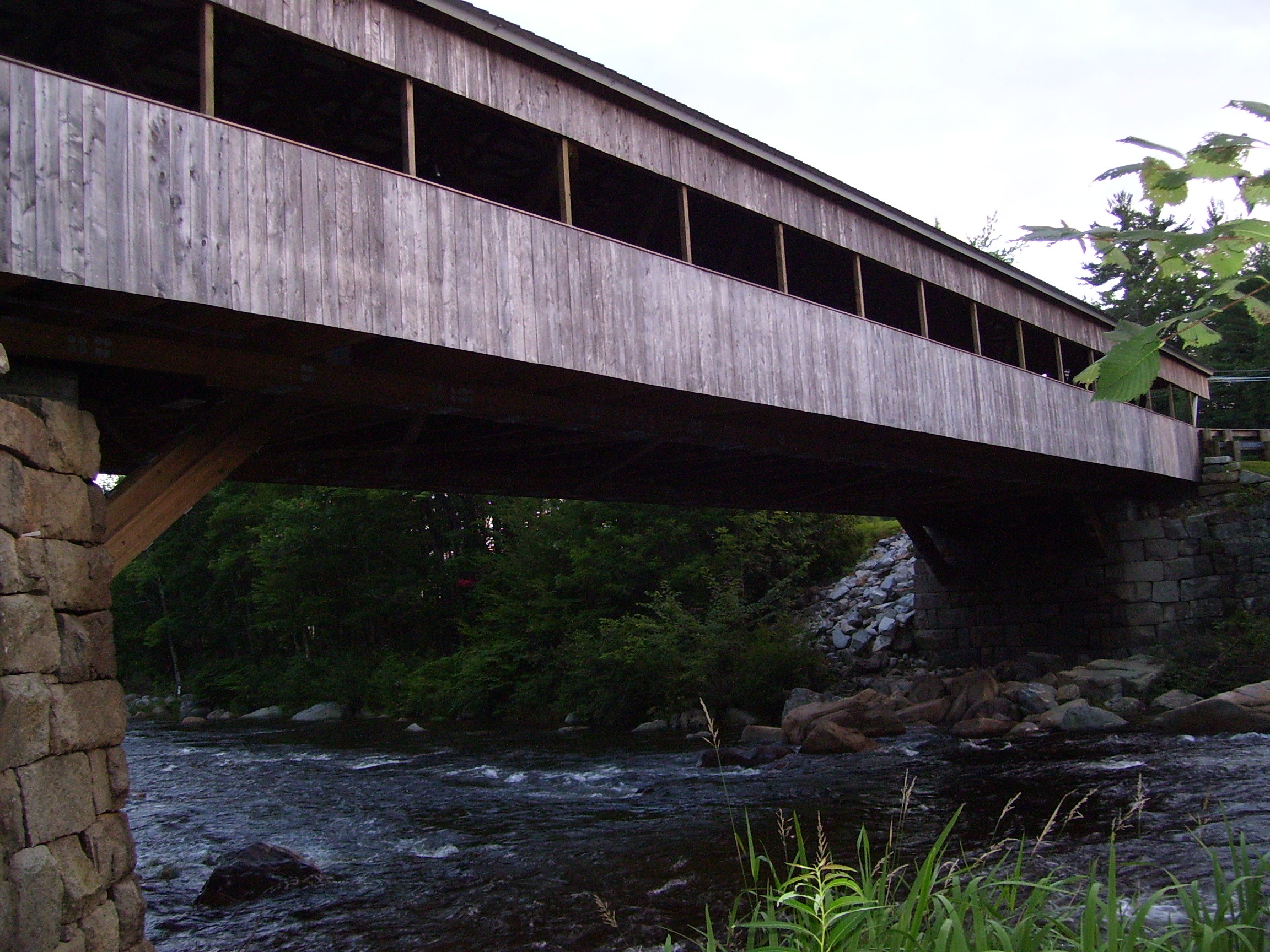
View of the bridge from the river side

== See also ==
- National Register of Historic Places listings in Carroll County, New Hampshire
