= Blueberry Mountain (Oxford County, Maine) =

Mountain in Maine, United States

- Location within Maine

Highest point
- Elevation: 1,781 ft (543 m)
- Coordinates: 44°15′57″N 70°58′43″W

Geography
- Location: Oxford County, Maine, U.S.
- Topo map: USGS Speckled Mountain

Blueberry Mountain is a mountain located in western Maine. Named because of the abundant blueberries on its summit and upper slopes, it is a popular day hike. The summit area is partially open and has good views over Evans Notch and toward North and South Baldface in New Hampshire. It is ascended by the White Cairn, Stone House, and Blueberry Ridge trails. It is considered a spur of Speckled Mountain.
