= Goodrich Falls =

Waterfall and populated place in New Hampshire

Coordinates: 44°7′34″N 71°11′24″W

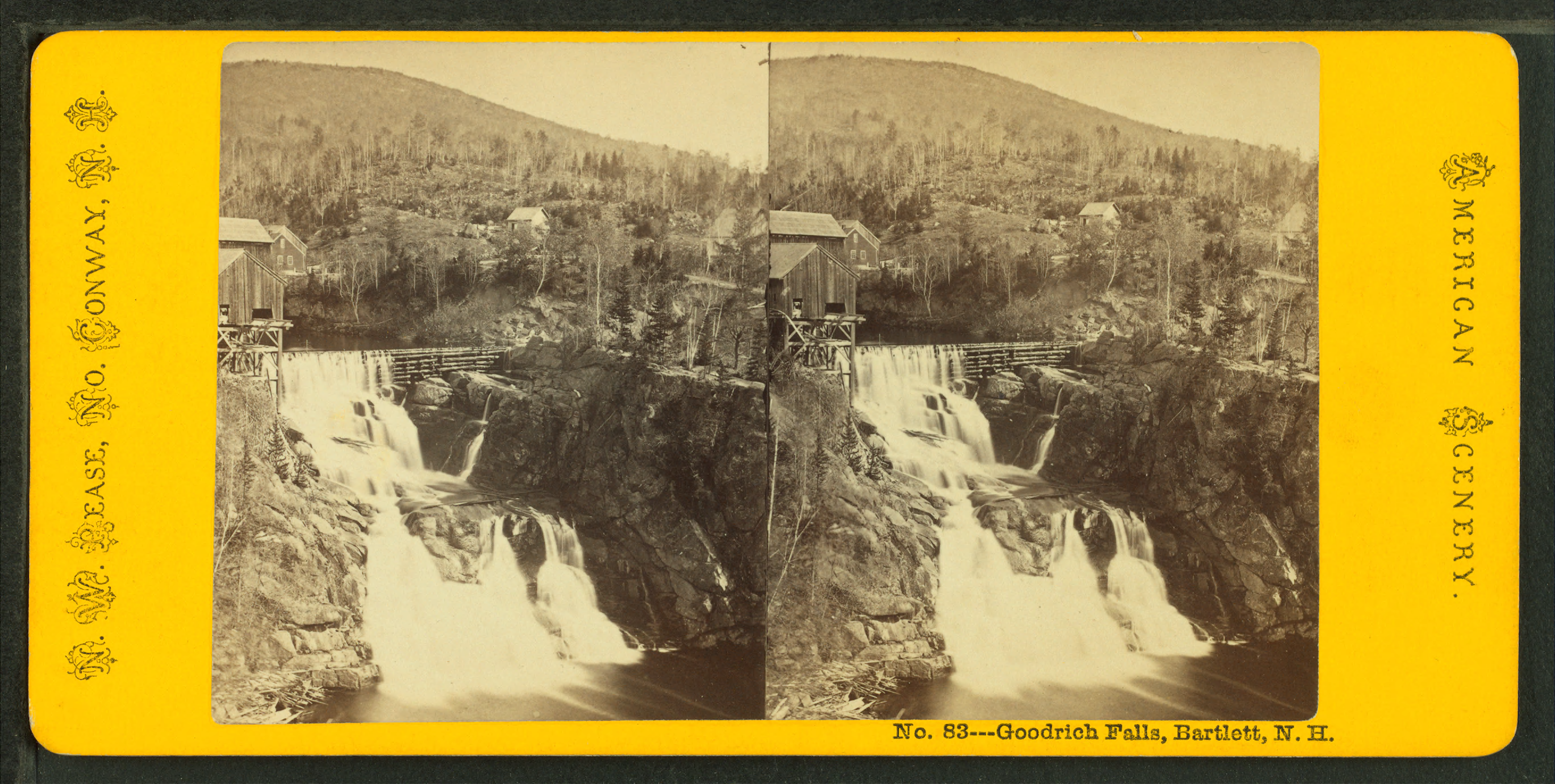

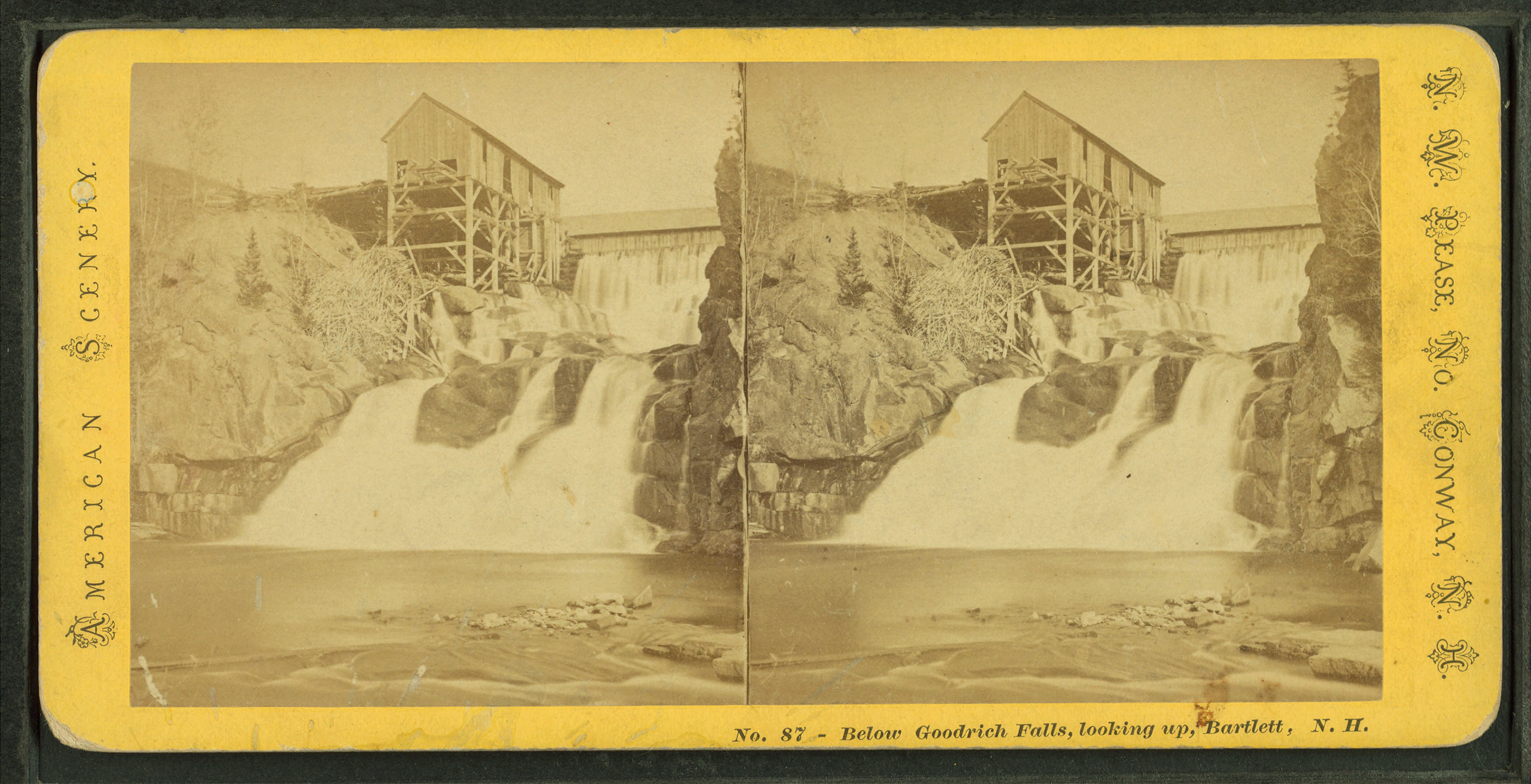
Goodrich Falls in Bartlett, New Hampshire

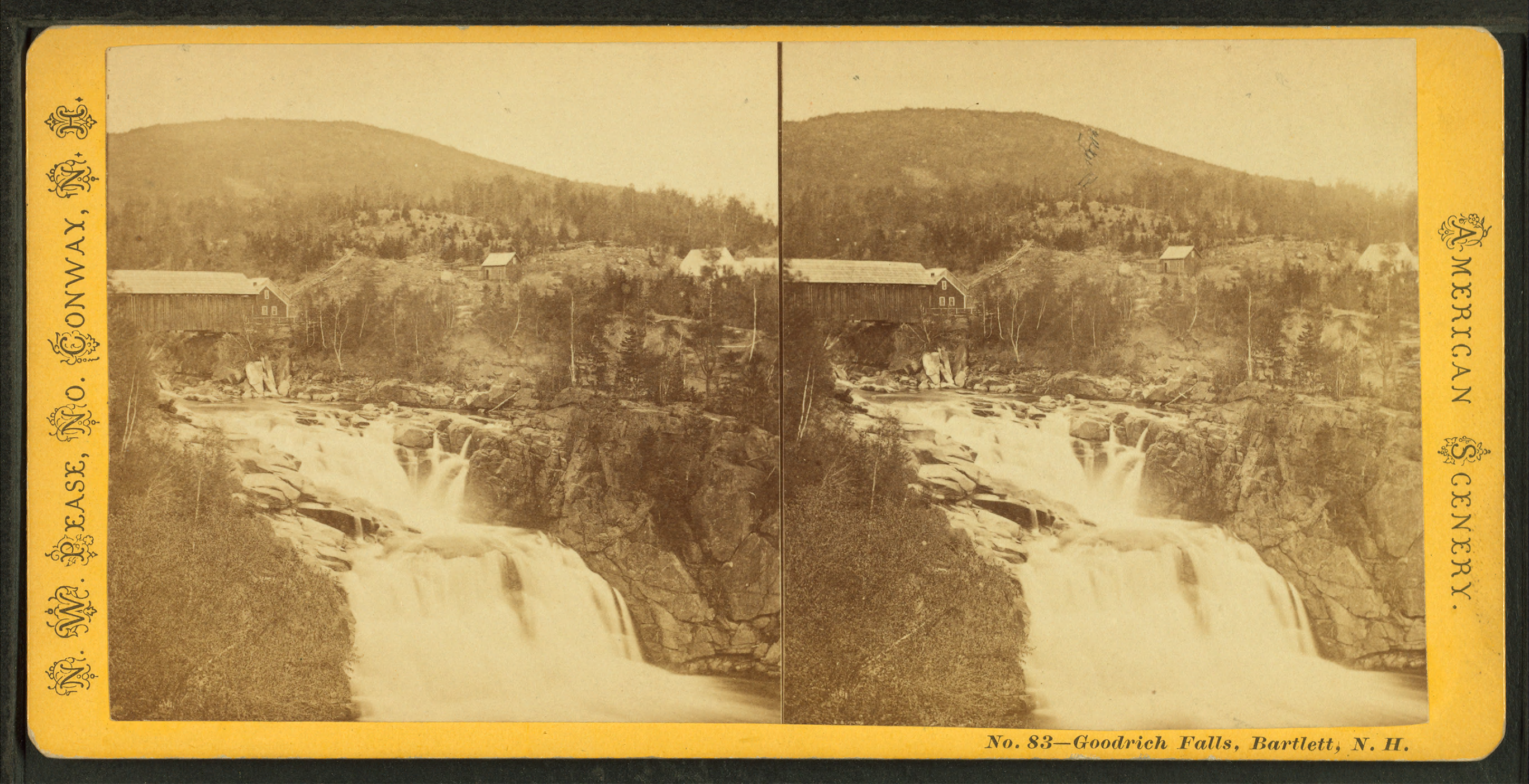

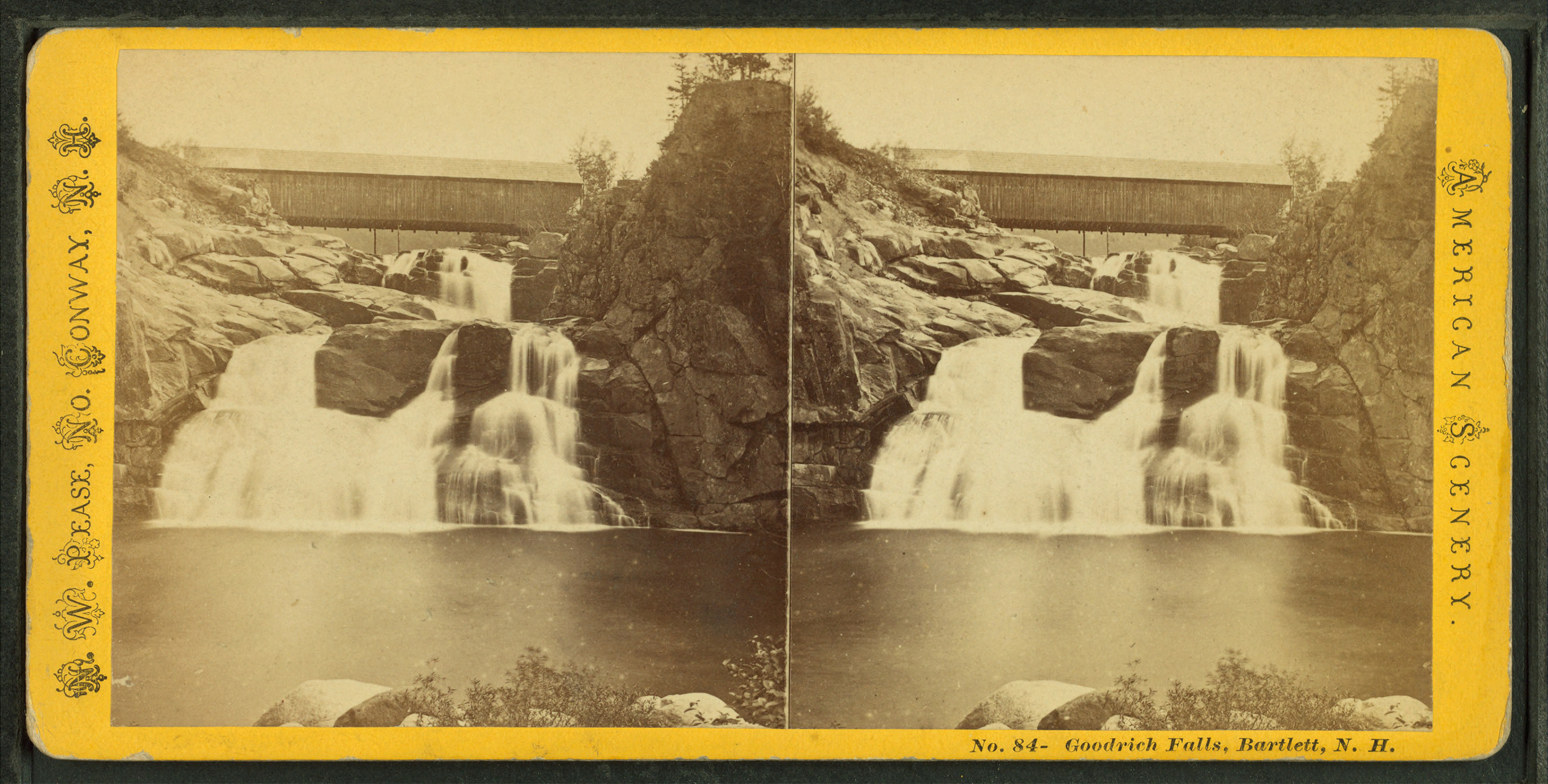

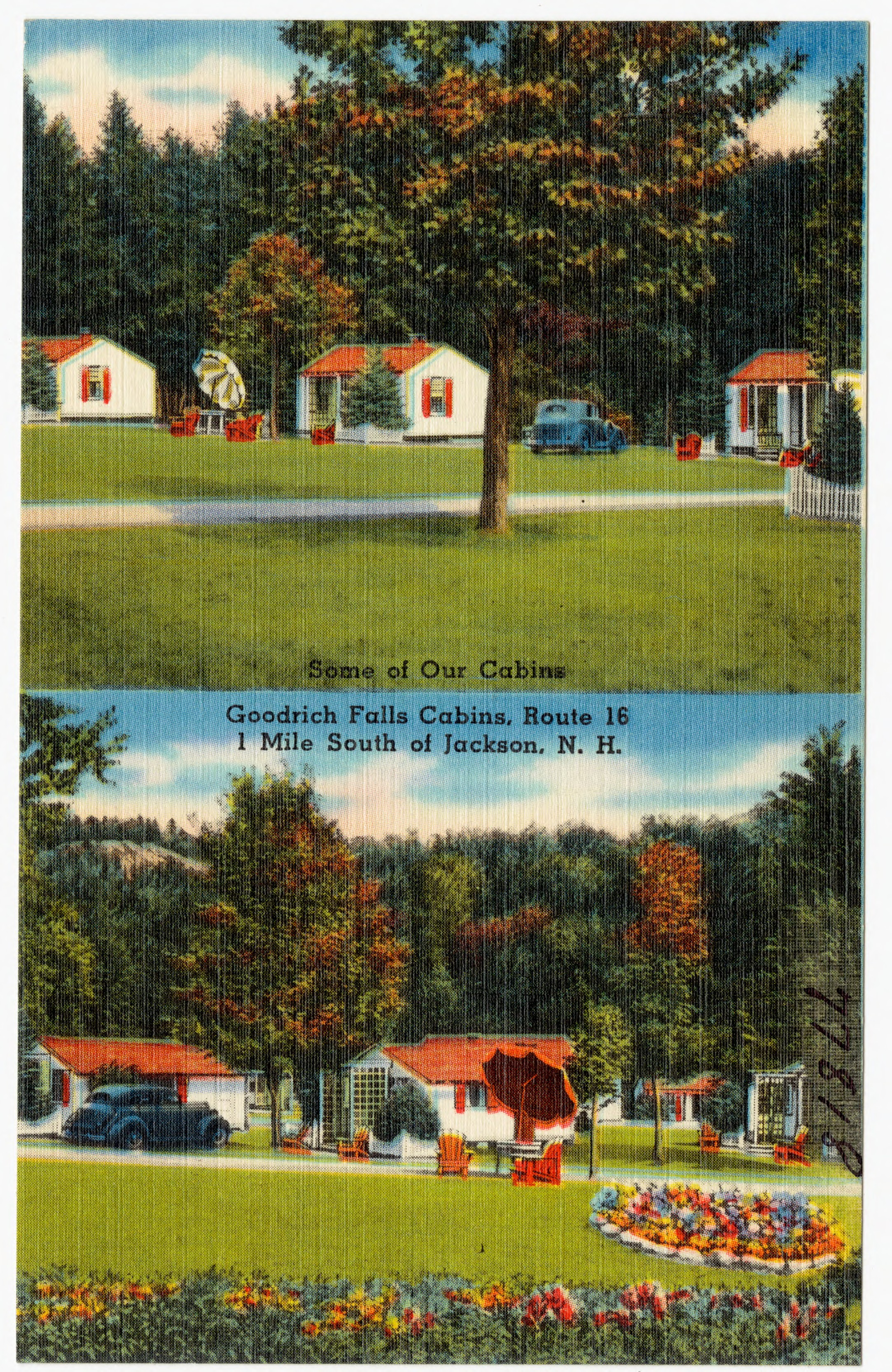
Postcard of Goodrich Falls Cabins on New Hampshire Route 16

Goodrich Falls is a populated place in the town of Bartlett along the Ellis River in Carroll County, New Hampshire, United States. The falls were featured in stereoscopic images in the 19th century including by Kilburn Brothers and Nathan W. Pease. New Hampshire Route 16 bridges the river just upstream from the falls.

The Goodrich Falls Hydroelectric Plant was completed in 1935. It was built by Edwin Moody, owner of the Black Mountain Ski Area (then known as Moody's), and Phil Robertson. Moody and local inventor George Morton constructed one of the first ski lifts in New Hampshire and used the plant to power the lift and lodge. Goodrich Falls Hydroelectric Corporation took over the plant in 1977.

In 1899, the town of Jackson paid the Goodrich Falls Electric Company to illuminate Honeymoon Bridge, a wooden covered bridge over the Ellis River.
