= Blueberry Mountain =

Blueberry Mountain may refer to:

- Blueberry Mountain, Alberta, Canada
- Blueberry Mountain (Oxford County, Maine)
