= Black Mountain Ski Area =

Ski area in New Hampshire, United States

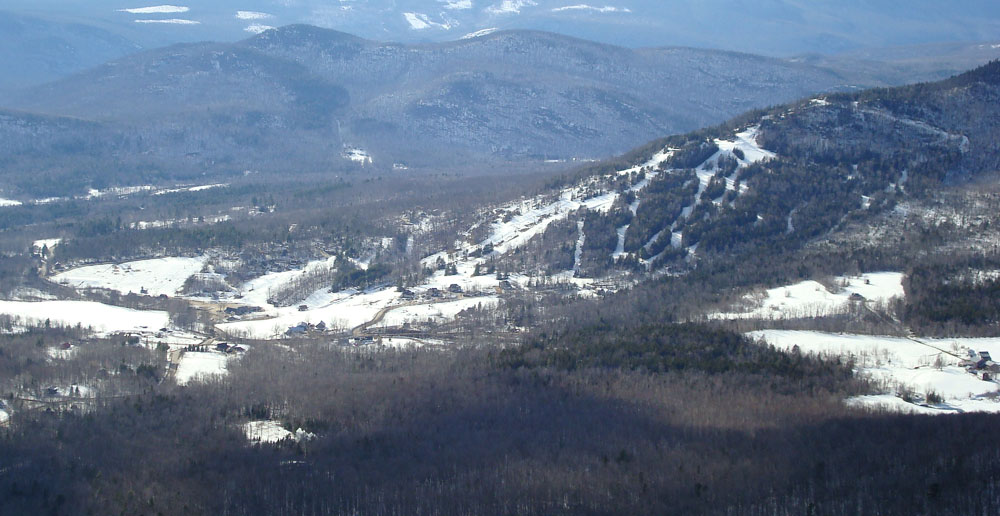
- Interactive map of Black Mountain Ski Area
- Location: Jackson, New Hampshire, U.S.
- Nearest city: North Conway, New Hampshire
- Coordinates: 44°10′6″N 71°9′52″W
- Status: Operational (seasonally)
- Opened: 1935; 91 years ago (Note: The resort's website markets itself as "Since 1935"; see the History section for additional detail.)
- Owner: Erik Mogensen, Indy Ski Pass, Entabeni Systems
- Vertical: 1,100 ft (340 m)
- Trails: 45, plus 15 glades
- Lift system: 2 chairs (1 triple, 1 double), 2 surface lifts, 1 rope tow
- Snowmaking: 98%
- Website: Black Mountain Ski Area

Black Mountain Ski Area is an alpine ski area located in Jackson, New Hampshire, United States. First used in the mid-1930s, it has operated seasonally since shortly after World War II. Black Mountain offers terrain for all abilities, including slopes for novices, cruising trails for intermediates, and black diamond trails for experts. The terrain is served by two chairlifts and three surface lifts. In addition to alpine skiing and snowboarding, it also offers summer camps and equine programs.

== History ==
=== 20th century ===
The Civilian Conservation Corps (CCC) cut the first ski trail on the mountain in 1934, making Black Mountain one of the oldest ski areas in New Hampshire. The Goodrich Falls Hydroelectric Plant was constructed in 1935 on the Ellis River to power the resort's lift and lodge. The power plant was built by Edwin Moody, owner of the ski area, then known as Moody's. Moody and local inventor George Morton constructed one of the first ski lifts in New Hampshire and used the plant to power the lift and lodge.

In 1936, H. Holland Whitney and his wife Helen Whitney purchased Moody's, renaming it Whitney's, and replaced the hanging ropes with Sears Roebuck & Co. shovel handles for improved riding.

In 1948, a 3,500-foot (1,100 m) Constam T-bar lift was installed, reportedly the longest of its kind in the country at the time. The lift accessed a 700-foot (210 m) vertical drop and enabled the development of several new trails, including Whitney, Davis, Hardscrabble, and Maple. In 1949, the ski area was officially renamed Black Mountain.

Black Mountain was among the first ski areas in the region to implement artificial snowmaking, installing its initial system in 1957. A 1,150-foot (350 m) Mueller T-bar was added in 1960 to serve beginner terrain, and in 1965, a double chairlift was installed, increasing the ski area's vertical drop to 1,100 feet (340 m).

In 1969, following the retirement of Betty and Bill Whitney, the ski area was sold to Don Murray, a former ski patrol director, and his wife Kathy. The Murrays operated the resort until 1982, when a group of local investors took over management, named Black Mountain Development Group.

In 1995, Black Mountain Development Group filed for bankruptcy, and Black Mountain was acquired by the Fichera family. As part of the reorganization agreement, operational and acquisition responsibilities for the ski area were assigned to John Fichera and the Northern Mountain Trust.

=== 21st century ===
In mid-October 2023, the Fichera family of the ski area advised that it would not open for the 2023–24 season, stating: “Due to circumstances beyond our control, including soaring energy costs, unpredictable weather, extreme staffing shortages throughout the region, and many other challenges, we have made the very difficult decision to cease operations.” Days later, management announced that an agreement had been reached with an external company that would allow the mountain to operate for the 2023–24 season, and find a buyer.

In October 2024, the CEO of Entabeni Systems and managing director of Indy Pass, Erik Mogensen, announced that his company would take over ownership of the ski area. The company’s approach was inspired by cooperatively owned ski areas such as Mad River Glen in Vermont.

In November 2024, the Black Mountain Cooperative was officially established to lead the resort's transition to community ownership, with the intention of transitioning the ski area to a community co-op by the 2025–26 season. The cooperative began the process of filing for an exemption with the U.S. Securities and Exchange Commission (SEC) to permit public offering of shares. The stated goal was to raise $5 million to purchase the resort’s real estate and invest in long-term improvements. The cooperative structure was intended to allow season pass holders and members of the public to become stakeholders in the resort’s operations and governance. As of early 2025, share offerings were expected to begin by the end of the year, with priority given to 2024–25 season pass holders.

Following the acquisition, improvements were made to the snowmaking system and point-of-sale infrastructure, and the mid-mountain Alpine Cabin was renovated to provide a European-style après-ski experience. Due to an increase in season pass holders during the 2024–25 season, Black Mountain remained operational through early April 2025 and announced plans to extend its season into May for the first time in its history.

In March 2026, plans for the cooperative were halted, as the resort was purchased by general manager Erik Mogensen, who announced intentions to use Black Mountain as "a laboratory for solving the challenges facing independent ski areas." In an open letter published on the resort's website, Mogensen wrote, "Entabeni Systems and Indy Ski Pass will exit our Colorado headquarters. We will move all operations to New Hampshire and the Mount Washington Valley. We will be the long-term custodian and again 100% owner of Black Mountain."
