= Chatham, New Hampshire =

- Town
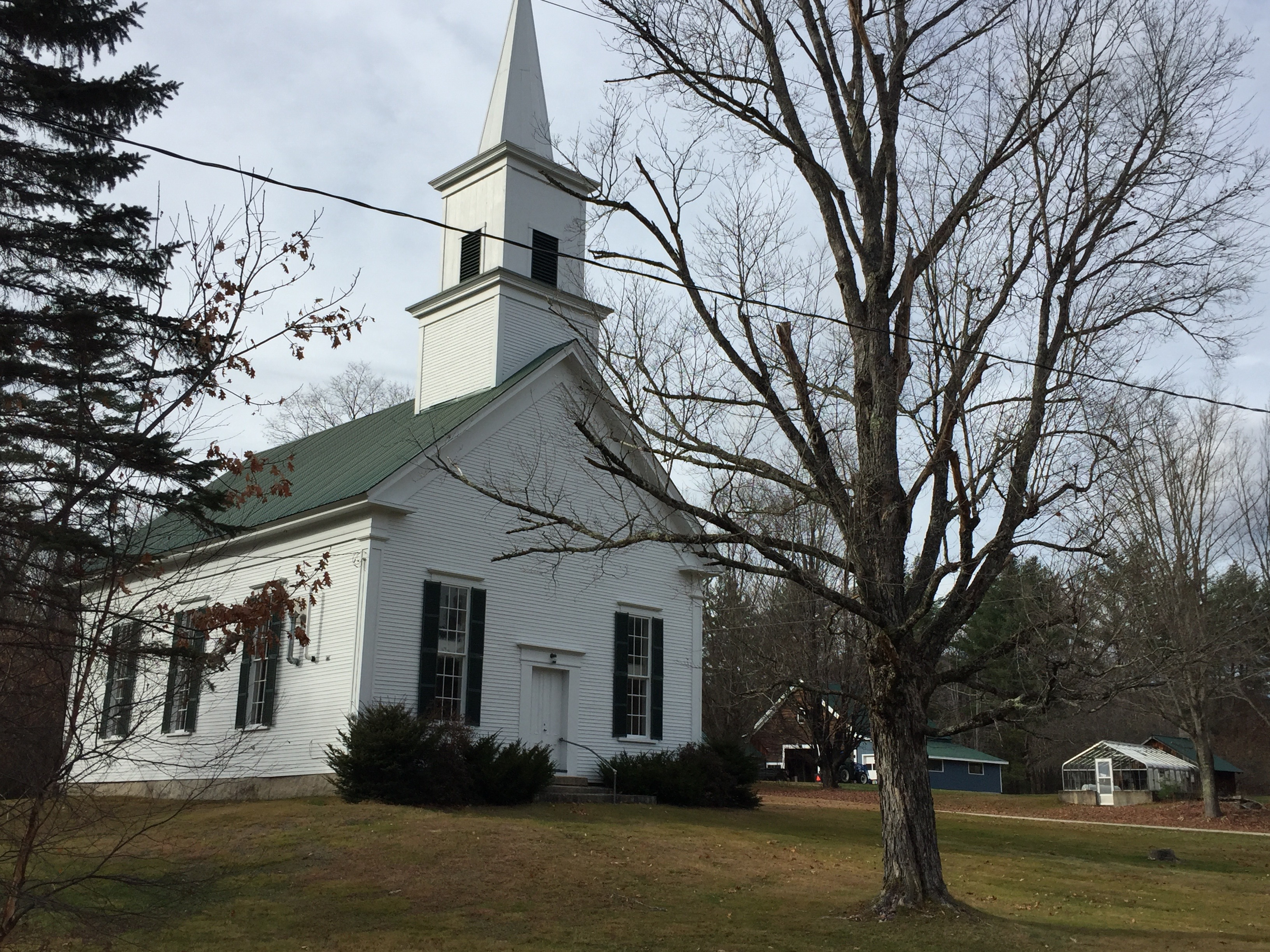
- Chatham Congregational Church in Chatham village

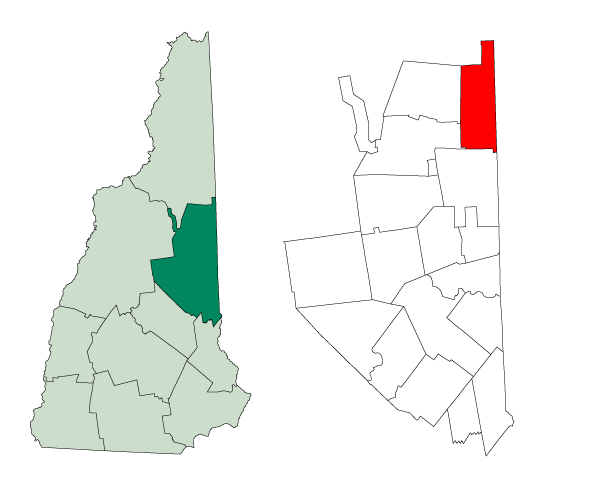
- Location in Carroll County, New Hampshire
- Coordinates: 44°10′04″N 71°02′14″W
- Country: United States
- State: New Hampshire
- County: Carroll
- Incorporated: 1767
- Villages: Chatham; North Chatham; South Chatham

Area
  - Total: 57.3 sq mi (148.3 km^{2})
  - Land: 56.7 sq mi (146.9 km^{2})
  - Water: 0.54 sq mi (1.4 km^{2}) 0.96%
- Elevation: 1,168 ft (356 m)

Population (2020)
  - Total: 341
  - Density: 6.01/sq mi (2.32/km^{2})
- Time zone: UTC-5 (Eastern)
  - Summer (DST): UTC-4 (Eastern)
- ZIP code: 03813
- Area code: 603
- FIPS code: 33-11780
- GNIS feature ID: 873563
- Website: chathamnh.org

Chatham is a town in Carroll County, New Hampshire, United States. The population was 341 at the 2020 census, and an estimated 357 in 2025. It is located in the White Mountains, and except for the southeastern corner, all of Chatham is in the White Mountain National Forest. The town is home to the Cold River national forest campgrounds.

== History ==
Chatham was granted to Peter Livins and others on February 7, 1767, by colonial Governor Benning Wentworth. The town was named in honor of William Pitt, Earl of Chatham and Prime Minister of Great Britain, who had recently led Britain to victory in the Seven Years War. Chatham was regranted in 1770 by his nephew, Governor John Wentworth, to a group including Samuel Langdon, president of Harvard College and creator of the "Blanchard Map" of the North Country. Part of Conway was annexed in 1829.

== Geography ==
According to the United States Census Bureau, the town has a total area of 57.3 square miles (148.3 km^{2}), of which 56.7 sq mi (146.9 km^{2}) are land and 0.54 sq mi (1.4 km^{2}), or 0.96%, are water. The highest point in Chatham is the summit of South Baldface, with an elevation of 3,547 feet (1,081 m) above sea level. Sable Mountain, elevation 3,519 ft (1,073 m), is in the west, and Robbins Ridge crosses the center of Chatham from east to west. Upper Kimball Pond is in the southeast, and Basin Pond is in the northeast. Chatham lies fully within the Saco River watershed.

An article in Statistics and Gazetteer of New-Hampshire (1875) stated,

"Carter's Mountain rises so high between this town and Jackson as to prevent the opening of a highway, and the people of the respective towns, in their intercourse, are obliged to pass through a portion of Maine. Kiarsarge [sic], in the south-west corner of the town, has...upon the summit...a commodious house for the accommodation of visitors. The views from this mountain are grand and very extensive. In the north-west corner is Baldface Mountain. Teams can be driven nearly to its summit. From the crest of this mountain the Tip-Top House on Mount Washington can be seen, also the ocean."

"Kiarsarge" (now Kearsarge North) and Baldface are now accessible only by hiking trails, and the summit of Kearsarge North has a lookout tower but no other structures. The views are still as extensive as before. Access to the town of Jackson continues to be partially through Maine by taking Maine State Route 113 south to the Fryeburg area, then traveling west through Conway. Route 113, leading north, crosses into New Hampshire in the North Chatham part of town, then curves back into Maine to cross the mountains in Evans Notch and descend north to U.S. Route 2 in Gilead, Maine.

North Chatham is a pene-enclave in the winter, functionally accessible to neighboring New Hampshire towns only by traveling through Maine first.

== Demographics ==
Historical population
Census	Pop.	Note	%±
1790	58		—
1800	183		215.5%
1810	201		9.8%
1820	298		48.3%
1830	419		40.6%
1840	523		24.8%
1850	516		−1.3%
1860	489		−5.2%
1870	445		−9.0%
1880	421		−5.4%
1890	329		−21.9%
1900	267		−18.8%
1910	209		−21.7%
1920	229		9.6%
1930	168		−26.6%
1940	184		9.5%
1950	177		−3.8%
1960	150		−15.3%
1970	134		−10.7%
1980	189		41.0%
1990	268		41.8%
2000	260		−3.0%
2010	337		29.6%
2020	341		1.2%
2024 (est.)	351		2.9%
U.S. Decennial Census

As of the census of 2000, there were 260 people, 107 households, and 71 families residing in the town. The population density was 4.6 inhabitants per square mile (1.8/km^{2}). There were 253 housing units at an average density of 4.5 per square mile (1.7/km^{2}). The racial makeup of the town was 98.08% White, 1.15% from other races, and 0.77% from two or more races.

There were 107 households, of which 29.0% had children under 18 living with them, 57.0% were married couples living together, 5.6% had a female householder with no husband present, and 33.6% were non-families. 27.1% of all households comprised individuals, and 8.4% had someone who was 65 or older living alone. The average household size was 2.43 and the average family size was 2.94.

The town's population was spread out, with 24.6% under 18, 4.2% from 18 to 24, 30.0% from 25 to 44, 30.4% from 45 to 64, and 10.8% who were 65 years of age or older. The median age was 41 years. For every 100 females, there were 106.3 males. For every 100 females age 18 and over, there were 106.3 males.

The median income for a household in the town was $37,188, and the median income for a family was $40,156. Males had a median income of $22,188 versus $20,313 for females. The per capita income for the town was $15,317. About 13.3% of families and 15.4% of the population were below the poverty line, including 23.9% of those under eighteen and none of those 65 or over.

=== Adjacent municipalities ===
- Bean's Purchase (north)
- South Oxford, Maine (northeast)
- Stow, Maine (east)
- Fryeburg, Maine (southeast)
- Conway (south)
- Bartlett (southwest)
- Jackson (west)
