= North Baldface =

Mountain in New Hampshire, United States

Coordinates: 44°14′34″N 71°05′13″W

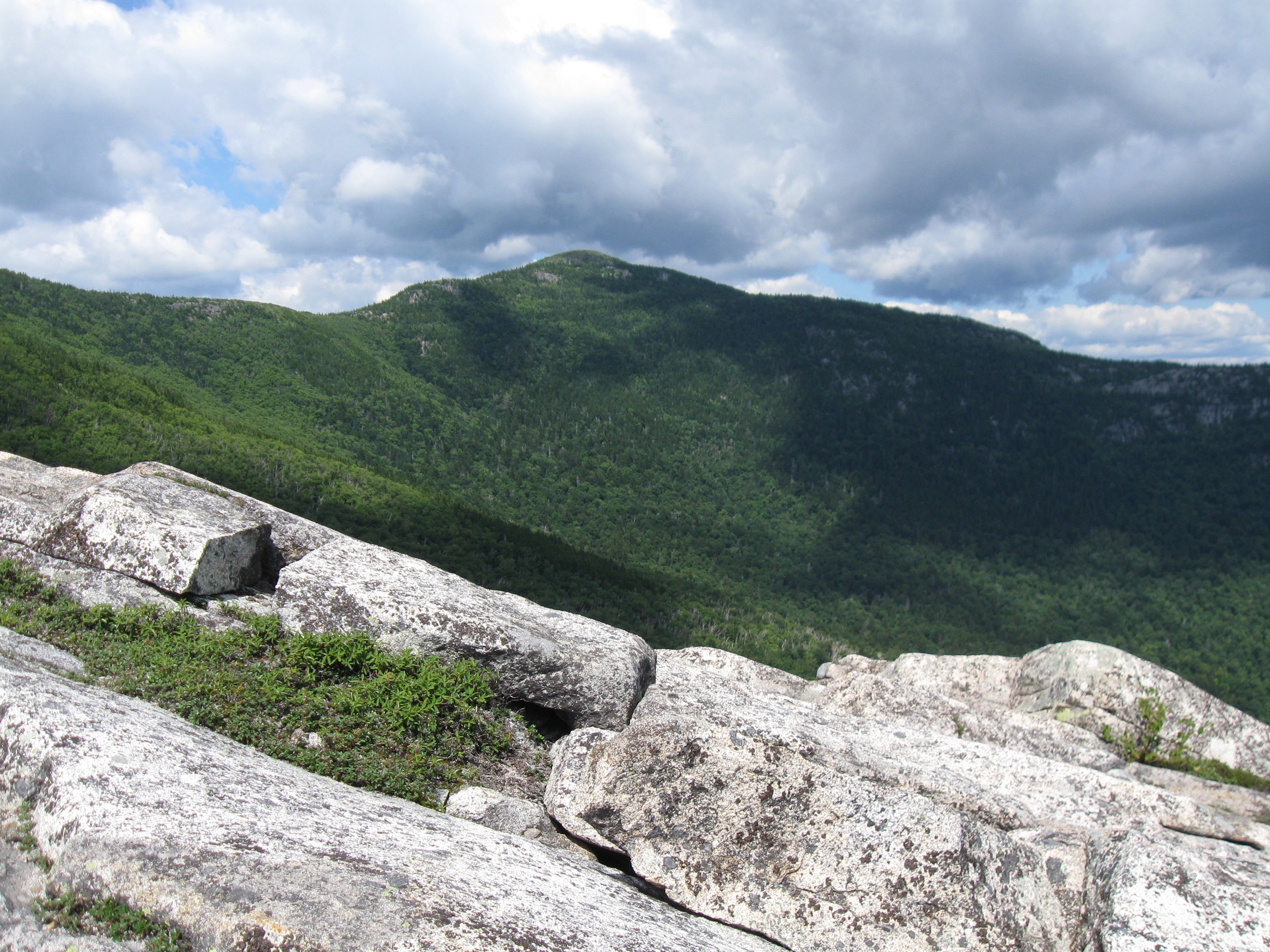
North Baldface

North Baldface is a 3,606-foot (1,099 m) mountain in the township of Bean's Purchase, New Hampshire in the eastern White Mountains. It gets its name from its steep barren southeast face. Along with the neighboring summit South Baldface, it is a popular hiking destination, especially in the summer. The two mountains are ascended by the Slippery Brook, Baldface Knob, Baldface Circle, Meader Ridge, and Bicknell Ridge trails.

== Nearby mountains and drainage ==
South Baldface is located directly to the southeast, along the Baldface Circle Trail. To the west is the valley of the Wild River with the Carter-Moriah Range beyond. Mount Meader, a 2,782-foot (848 m) summit, lies 3 miles (4.8 km) to the northeast.

The east side of the mountain drains via Charles Brook into the Cold River watershed, to the Saco River and thence the Atlantic Ocean; the southwest side drains into the East Branch Saco River then into the Saco; and the northwest side drains into the Wild River, a tributary of the Androscoggin River and ultimately the Kennebec River and Atlantic Ocean.

== See also ==
- Speckled Mountain
- Baldface-Royce Range
