= Eastman Mountain (New Hampshire) =

Mountain in New Hampshire, United States

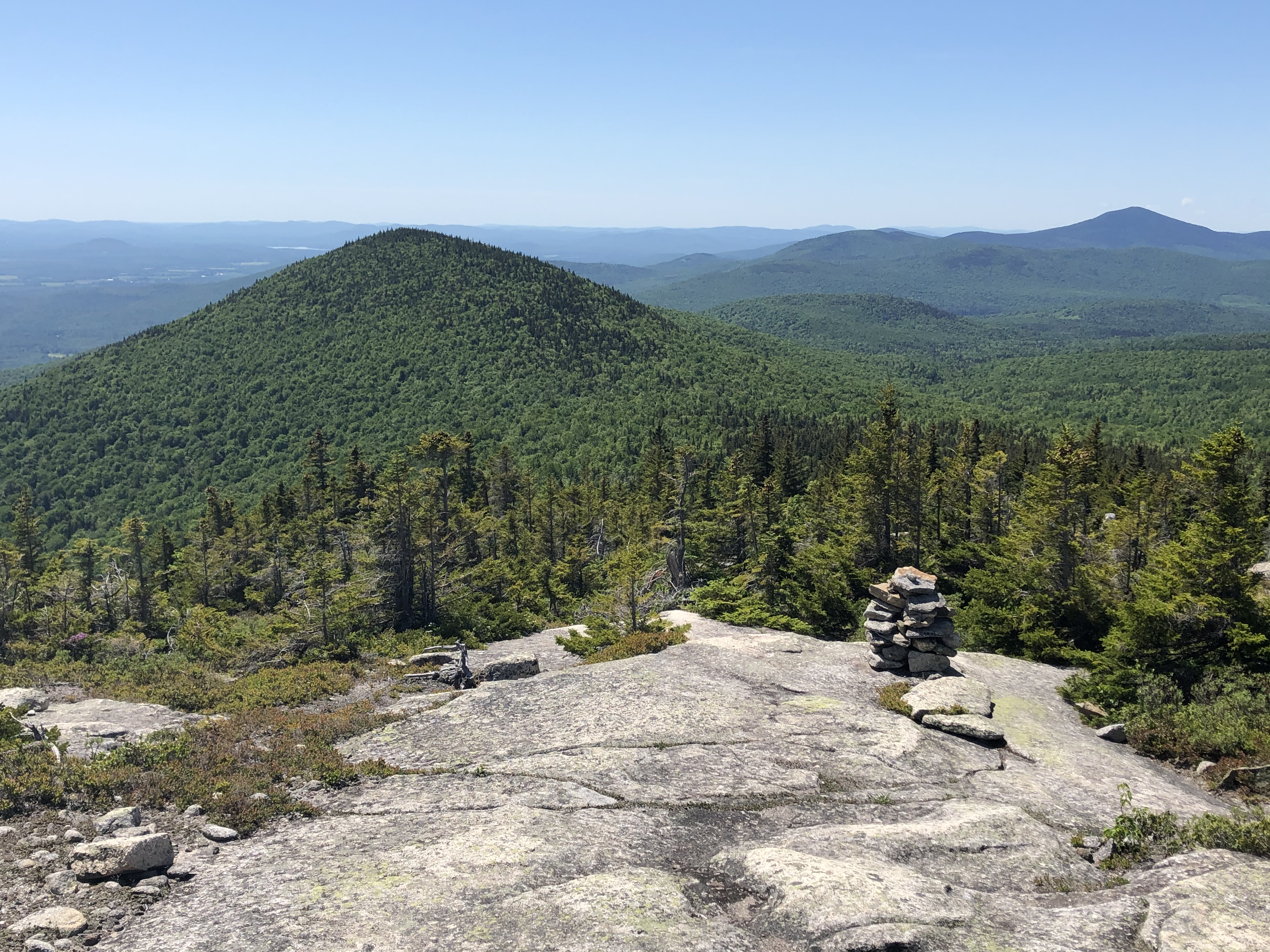
- Eastman Mountain (L) from Baldface Knob

Highest point
- Elevation: 2,939 ft (896 m) NGVD 29
- Prominence: 359 ft (109 m)
- Coordinates: 44°12′56″N 71°03′43″W

Geography
- Location within New Hampshire
- Location: Carroll County, New Hampshire U.S.
- Parent range: Baldface-Royce Range
- Topo map: USGS Chatham

Eastman Mountain is a mountain at the southern end of the Baldface-Royce Range, located in Carroll County, New Hampshire. It is accessed by the Eastman Mountain Trail. Its summit is partially open and provides good views.
