= South Baldface =

Mountain in New Hampshire, United States

Coordinates: 44°13′50″N 71°04′41″W

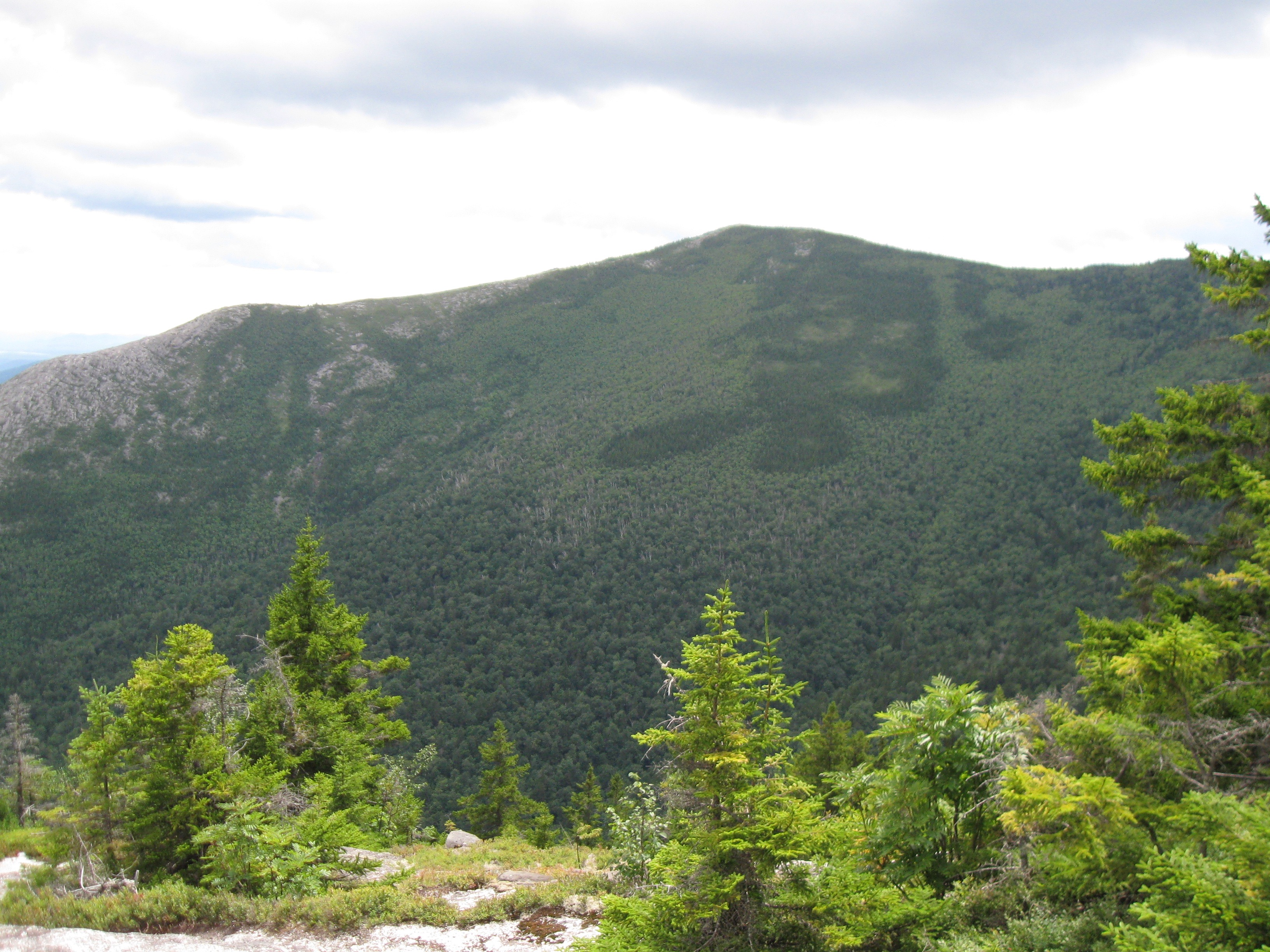
South Baldface

South Baldface is a 3,547-foot (1,081 m) mountain in the town of Chatham, New Hampshire in the eastern White Mountains. It gets its name from its steep barren eastern face. Along with the neighboring summit North Baldface, it is a popular hiking destination, especially in the summer. The two mountains are ascended by the Slippery Brook, Baldface Knob, Baldface Circle, Meader Ridge, and Bicknell Ridge trails.

== Nearby mountains and drainage ==
North Baldface lies directly to the northwest. Eastman Mountain, a partially wooded mountain that is climbed by a .8-mile (1.3 km) trail that diverges from the Slippery Brook Trail, is to the southeast. Sable Mountain and Chandler Mountain, two heavily wooded and trailless summits, are to the southwest.

The northeast and east sides of the mountain drain into the Cold River watershed, a tributary of the Saco River, which flows to the Atlantic Ocean; the west side drains into the East Branch Saco River, thence into the Saco; and the south side drains into Slippery Brook, a tributary of the East Branch of the Saco.

== See also ==
- Speckled Mountain
