= Wildcat Brook =

Stream in New Hampshire, United States

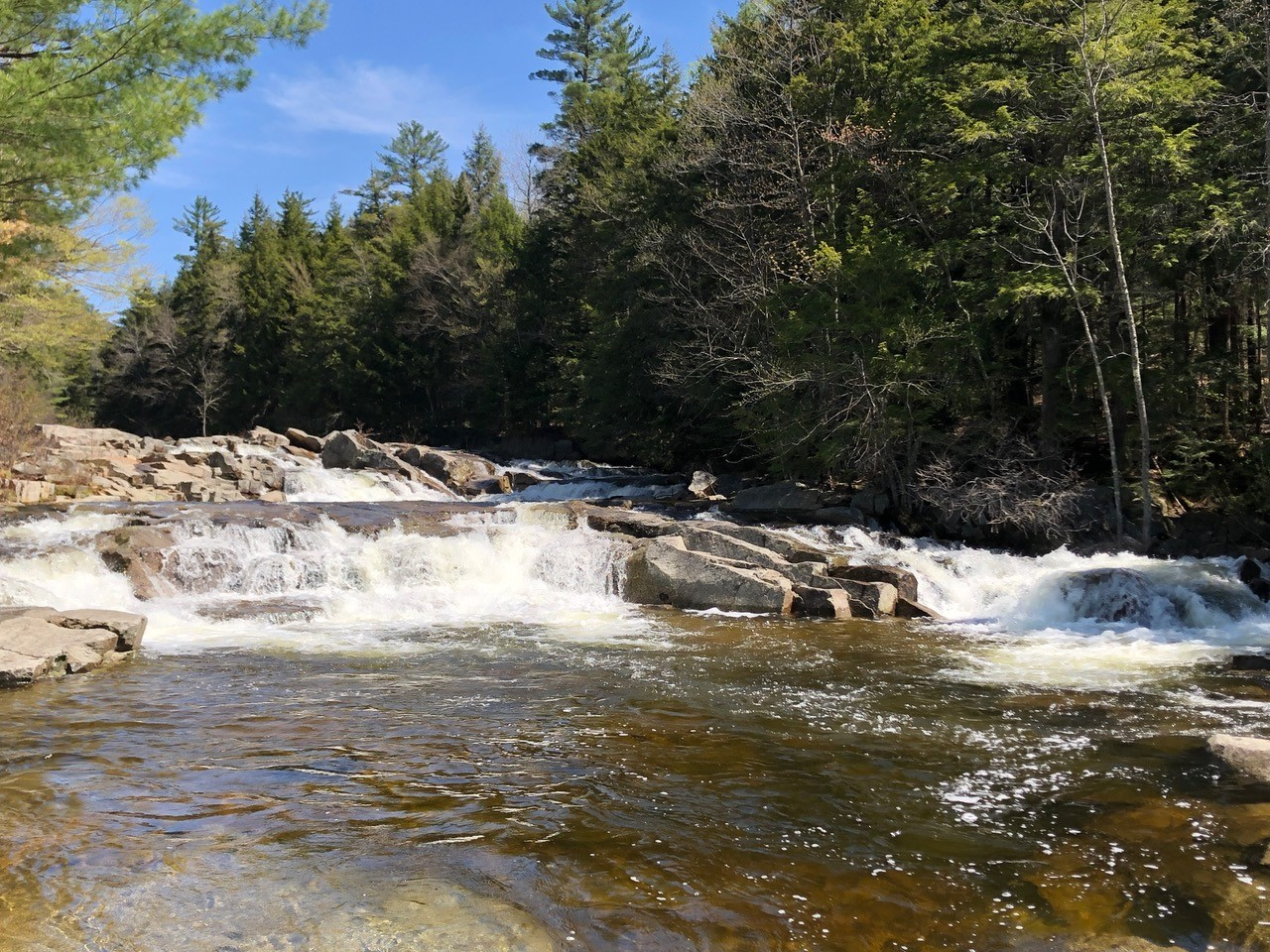
- Wildcat Brook above Jackson Falls, May 2023

- Location in New Hampshire Location in the United States

Location
- Country: United States
- State: New Hampshire
- Counties: Coos, Carroll
- Township and town: Bean's Purchase, Jackson

Physical characteristics
- Source: Carter Notch
  - location: Bean's Purchase
  - coordinates: 44°15′32″N 71°11′40″W
  - elevation: 3,280 ft (1,000 m)
- Mouth: Ellis River
  - location: Jackson
  - coordinates: 44°8′32″N 71°11′9″W
  - elevation: 740 ft (230 m)
- Length: 9.05 mi (14.56 km)

Basin features
- Tributaries
  - left: Bog Brook, Davis Brook, Great Brook
  - right: Little Wildcat Brook, Marsh Brook

National Wild and Scenic Rivers System
- Type: Scenic, Recreational
- Designated: October 28, 1988

Wildcat Brook, also known as the Wildcat River, is a 9.05-mile-long (14.56 km) stream in the White Mountains of New Hampshire, in the United States. It rises at Carter Notch in the township of Bean's Purchase in Coos County, and flows south through the town of Jackson in Carroll County to its confluence with the Ellis River near the town's southern boundary. At Jackson Falls, near the town center, the stream descends 120 feet (37 m) in 1/4 mile (0.4 km) over granite ledges, paralleled by New Hampshire Route 16B (Carter Notch Road). The surrounding area is part of the Jackson Falls Historic District.

Via the Ellis River, Wildcat Brook is part of the Saco River watershed, with its waters reaching the Atlantic Ocean near Biddeford, Maine. The entire brook, from Carter Notch to the Ellis River, is part of the designated National Wild and Scenic River System, as are its tributaries Little Wildcat Brook, Bog Brook, and Great Brook.

== Gallery ==
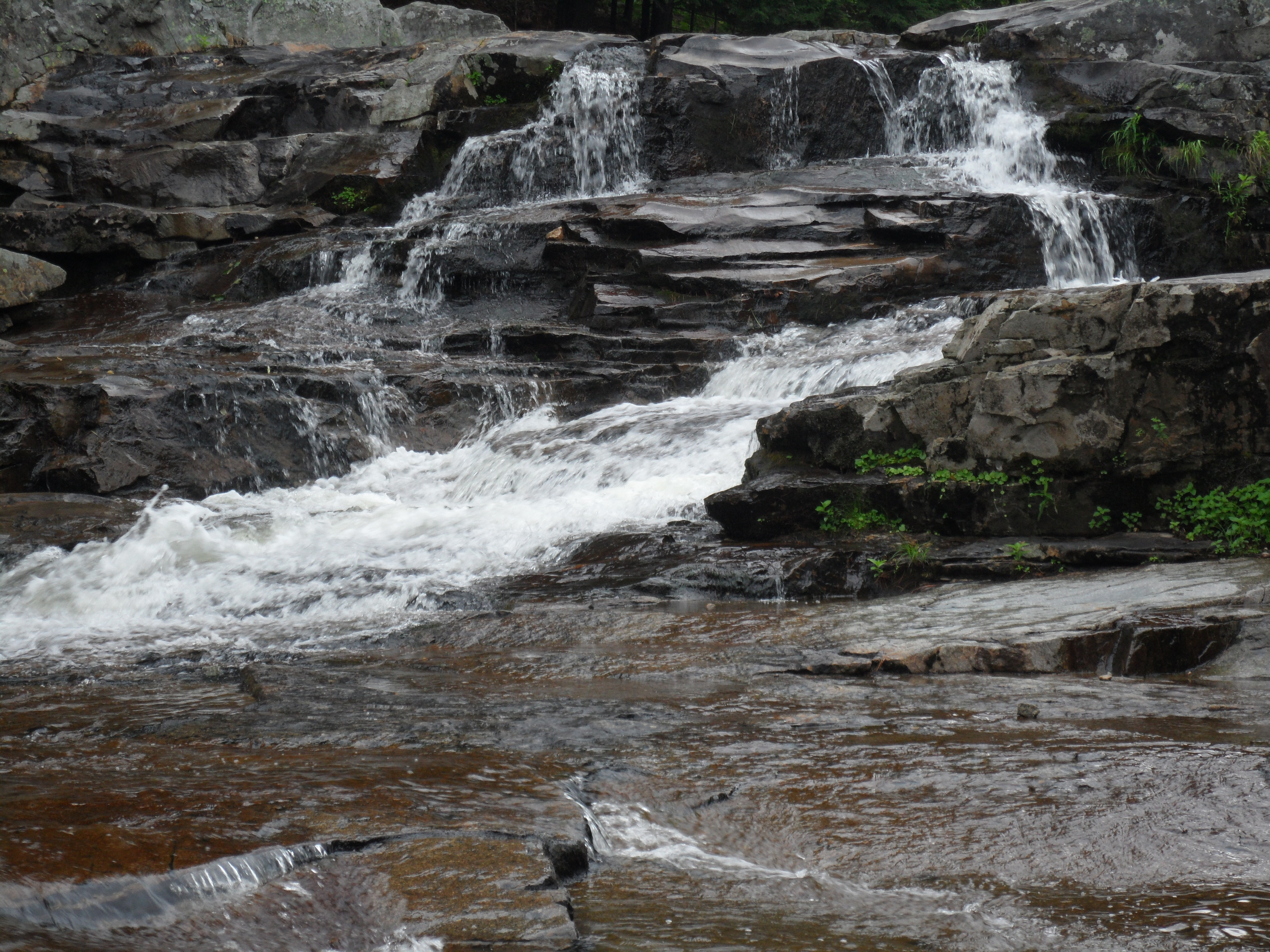
Jackson Falls

== See also ==
- List of rivers in New Hampshire

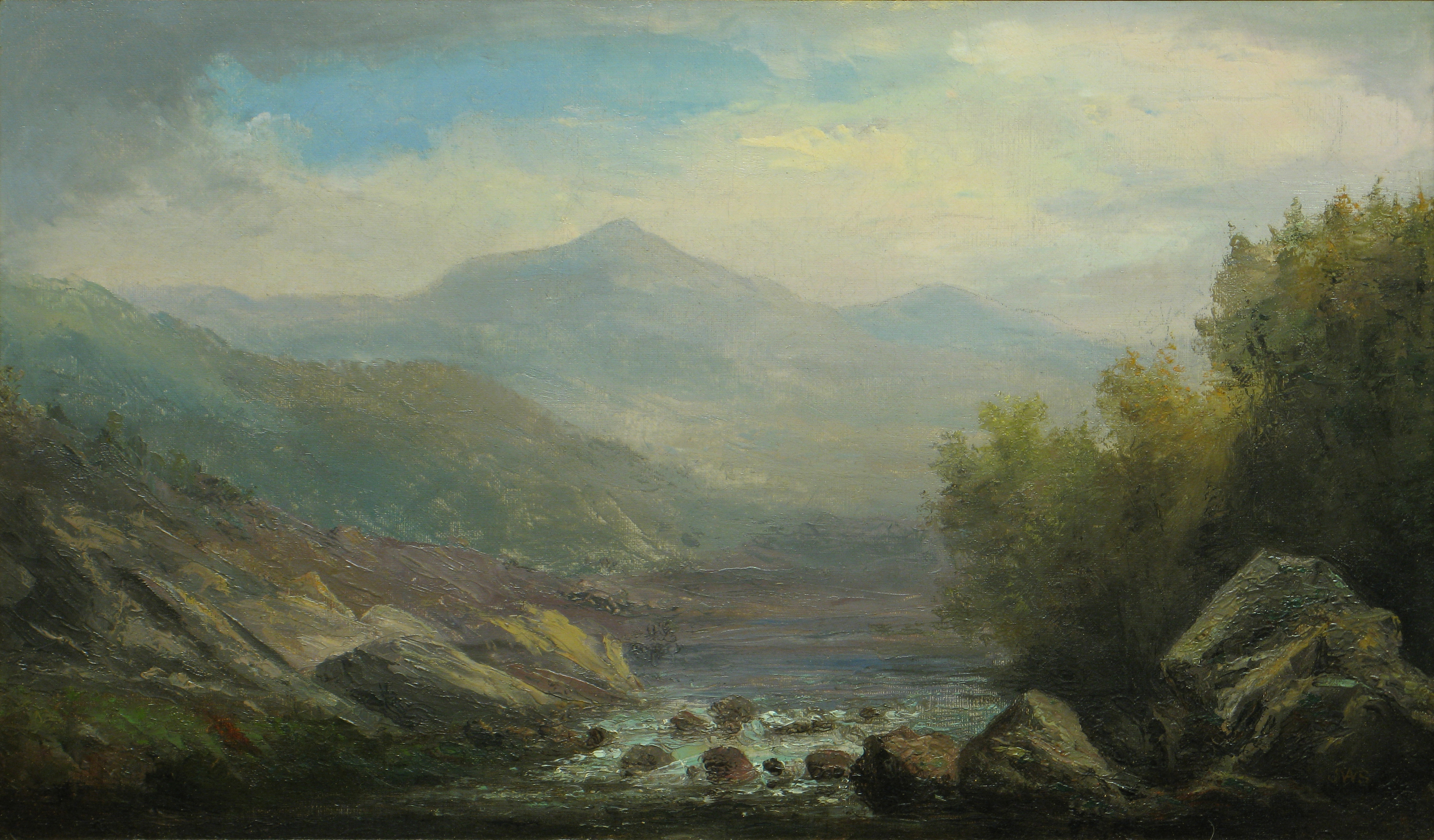
Wildcat Brook, by John White Allen Scott
