= Wild River (Androscoggin River tributary) =

River in New Hampshire and Maine, United States

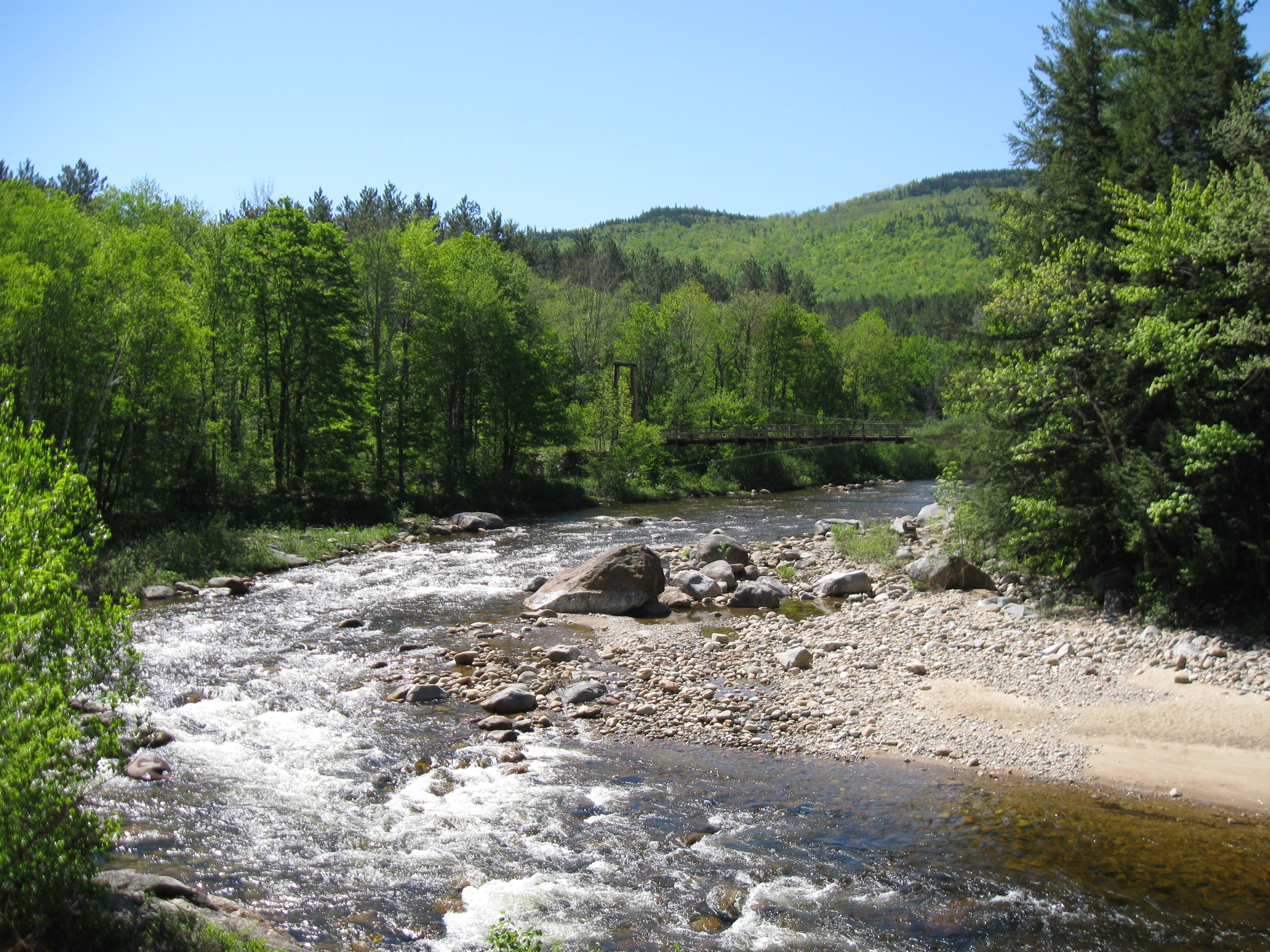
- The Wild River at Hastings, Maine

- Location within New Hampshire Location within Maine Location within the United States

Location
- Country: United States
- States: New Hampshire, Maine
- Counties: Carroll, NH; Coos, NH; Oxford, ME
- Towns and townships: Jackson, NH; Bean's Purchase, NH; Shelburne, NH; South Oxford, ME; Gilead, ME

Physical characteristics
- Source: Black Mountain
  - location: Jackson, NH
  - coordinates: 44°13′51″N 71°9′0″W
  - elevation: 2,810 ft (860 m)
- Mouth: Androscoggin River
  - location: Gilead, ME
  - coordinates: 44°23′45″N 70°58′45″W
  - elevation: 678 ft (207 m)
- Length: 17.2 mi (27.7 km)

Basin features
- Tributaries
  - left: Red Brook, Spruce Brook, Cypress Brook, Moriah Brook, Bull Brook, Martins Brook
  - right: Baldface Brook, Cedar Brook, Blue Brook, Twin Brook, Dew Drop Brook, Burnt Mill Brook, Evans Brook, Little Lary Brook, Gammon Brook

The Wild River is a 17.2-mile-long (27.7 km) river in the White Mountains of New Hampshire and Maine in the United States. It is a tributary of the Androscoggin River, which flows east and south to the Kennebec River near the Atlantic Ocean.

== Route ==
The Wild River rises on the north end of Black Mountain in the northern part of the town of Jackson, New Hampshire. It flows northeast off the mountain, entering the township of Bean's Purchase, and picks up the stream outlet of No Ketchum Pond coming in from the northwest. The Wild River continues northeast through a mountain valley separating the Carter-Moriah Range to the northwest and the Baldface-Royce Range to the southeast. The river crosses the southeast corner of the town of Shelburne, New Hampshire, then enters Maine and picks up Evans Brook, flowing northerly from the height of land in Evans Notch, near the former logging company town of Hastings. Maine Highway 113 follows Evans Brook and then the east bank of the Wild River from Hastings northward to the Wild River confluence with the Androscoggin River at Gilead, Maine. The Wild River is bridged by U.S. Route 2 and the St. Lawrence & Atlantic Railroad at Gilead.

== Early history ==
Early European settlement of the watershed was northerly up the Cold River valley from Fryeburg, Maine, through Evans Notch and then down Evans Brook to Gilead. Evans Notch and Evans Brook were named for Captain John Evans, who commanded European militia against the indigenous inhabitants in 1781.

The town of Gilead was incorporated in 1804. The Atlantic and St. Lawrence Railroad from Portland to Montreal followed the south bank of the Androscoggin River and reached Gilead in 1851. The railroad bridge was the first river crossing durable enough to withstand runoff events from winter storms. Peak runoff events were similarly destructive to attempts to construct water-powered mills adjacent to the river. Construction of the road now known as Maine Highway 113 commenced in 1866.

In 1882, Major Gideon Hastings obtained title to large tracts of timberland and commenced operations of the Hastings Lumber Company.

== Wild River Railroad ==
In 1891, a railroad was built following the present Route 113 from Gilead to Hastings lumber mill on Evans Brook near its confluence with the Wild River. A row of ten houses built along the Wild River for company employees at Hastings became known as "the ten commandments". Rails extended 10 miles (16 km) up the Wild River from Hastings by 1896 with branch lines up tributaries Bull Brook, Blue Brook, Moriah Brook, Cypress Brook, and Spruce Brook. A 1903 wildfire destroyed the unharvested timber in the watershed. The railroad was dismantled in 1904. The lumber company land was purchased for the White Mountain National Forest between 1912 and 1918. Passage of the New England Wilderness Act in December 2006 designated 23,700 acres (9,600 ha) of the watershed as the Wild River Wilderness.

=== Locomotives ===
| Number | Name | Builder | Type | Date | Works number | Notes |
|---|---|---|---|---|---|---|
| 1 | Gilead | Lima Locomotive Works | 2-truck, 3-cylinder Shay | 30 September 1891 | 370 | purchased new - destroyed by boiler explosion 18 April 1899 |
| 2 | | Portland Company | 4-4-0 | 1871 | 202 | formerly Portland and Ogdensburg Railway #4 Hyde Park - replaced by # 4 and boiler used in the wood alcohol mill of the Hastings Chemical Company |
| 3 | | Lima Locomotive Works | 2-truck, 3-cylinder Shay | 10 November 1896 | 523 | built as Success Pond Railroad # 6; leased from Blanchard & Twitchell Company of Berlin, New Hampshire to replace # 1; went to White River Railroad of Woodstock, Vermont when Wild River Railroad was dismantled |
| 4 | | Baldwin Locomotive Works | 2-4-2 Tank locomotive | 1900 | 17433 | purchased new to replace # 2 - sold to Berlin Mills Railroad in 1904 |

== Recreation ==
In the summer and early fall, the river has low water, although it holds native brook trout. The Wild River Trail follows the old railroad grade along the river. Older maps may show foot bridges that no longer exist. Route 113 is not maintained in the winter and may be closed from late fall to early spring. The Appalachian Trail follows the crest of the Carter-Moriah Range along the western boundary of the watershed.

== See also ==
- List of rivers of Maine
- List of rivers of New Hampshire
