= Bean's Purchase, New Hampshire =

Township in Coos County, New Hampshire, United States

- Township
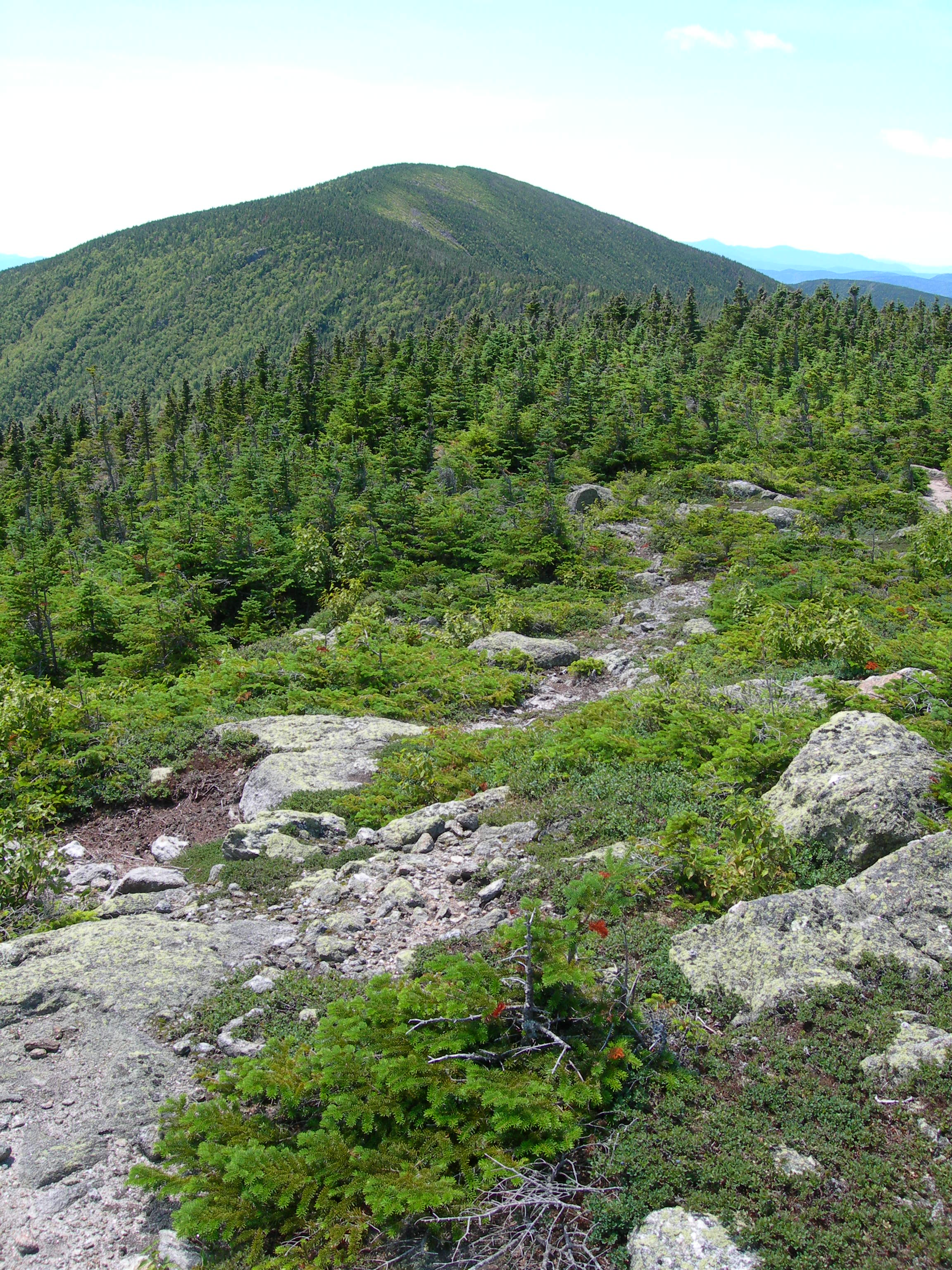
- Carter Dome seen from Mt. Hight

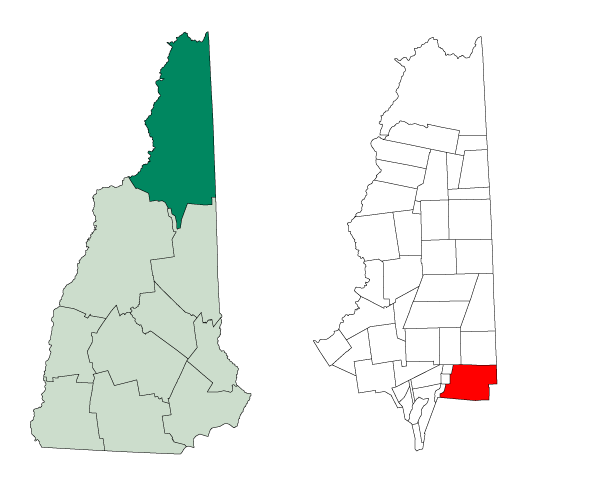
- Location in Coös County, New Hampshire
- Coordinates: 44°17′27″N 71°6′31″W
- Country: United States
- State: New Hampshire
- County: Coös

Area
  - Total: 65.30 sq mi (169.12 km^{2})
  - Land: 65.19 sq mi (168.85 km^{2})
  - Water: 0.10 sq mi (0.27 km^{2}) 0.16%
- Elevation: 1,960 ft (600 m)

Population (2020)
  - Total: 0
- Time zone: UTC-5 (Eastern)
  - Summer (DST): UTC-4 (Eastern)
- Area code: 603
- FIPS code: 33-007-04260

Bean's Purchase is a township in Coös County, New Hampshire, United States. The purchase lies entirely within the White Mountain National Forest. The population was zero at the 2020 census, and was also estimated to be zero in 2025.

In New Hampshire, locations, grants, townships (which are different from towns), and purchases are unincorporated portions of a county which are not part of any town and have limited self-government (if any, as many are uninhabited).

== History ==
In 1851 the New Hampshire state legislature authorized the governor and council to appoint a land commissioner to sell the public lands, and James Willey of Conway was appointed to that office. Bean's Purchase was made by Commissioner Willey to Alpheus Bean of Bartlett in 1812 for $1,025 and contained about 59,000 acres (240 km^{2}).

In 1927, Beth McKenzie (née Richardson) was born in Bean's Purchase, making her the first white child born in the White Mountain National Forest, which was established in 1918. Betty Brook in the nearby town of Berlin is named in her honor.

== Geography ==
According to the United States Census Bureau, the purchase has a total area of 65.3 square miles (169.1 km^{2}), of which 0.1 square miles (0.3 km^{2}), or 0.16%, are water. The center of the purchase is within the valley of the Wild River, with a large portion of it within the Wild River Wilderness. The western side of the purchase is dominated by the ridgeline of Wildcat Mountain, the Carter mountains, and Mount Moriah. The highest point in Bean's Purchase is the summit of Carter Dome, at 4,832 feet (1,473 m) above sea level. The Appalachian Trail crosses the purchase, following the crest of the Wildcat-Carter-Moriah ridge. The west side of the ridgeline drains to the Peabody River. The Peabody and Wild rivers are both northeast-flowing tributaries of the Androscoggin River. The summits of North Baldface, Mount Meader, and West Royce form a line along the eastern edge of Bean's Purchase, and the eastern slopes of those mountains are part of the Saco River watershed.

=== Adjacent municipalities ===
- Shelburne (north)
- South Oxford, Maine (east)
- Chatham (southeast)
- Jackson (south)
- Pinkham's Grant (west)
- Green's Grant (west)
- Martin's Location (west)
- Gorham (northwest)

== Demographics ==
Historical population
Census	Pop.	Note	%±
1930	25		—
1940	0		−100.0%
1950	0		—
1960	0		—
1970	0		—
1980	0		—
1990	0		—
2000	4		—
2010	0		−100.0%
2020	0		—
U.S. Decennial Census

As of the 2020 census, the population of the township was zero. Bean's Purchase is part of the Berlin, NH-VT Micropolitan Statistical Area.

== See also ==
- New Hampshire historical marker no. 284: Betty Brook
