= Mount Meader =

Mountain in New Hampshire, United States

Coordinates: 44°16′09″N 71°03′13″W

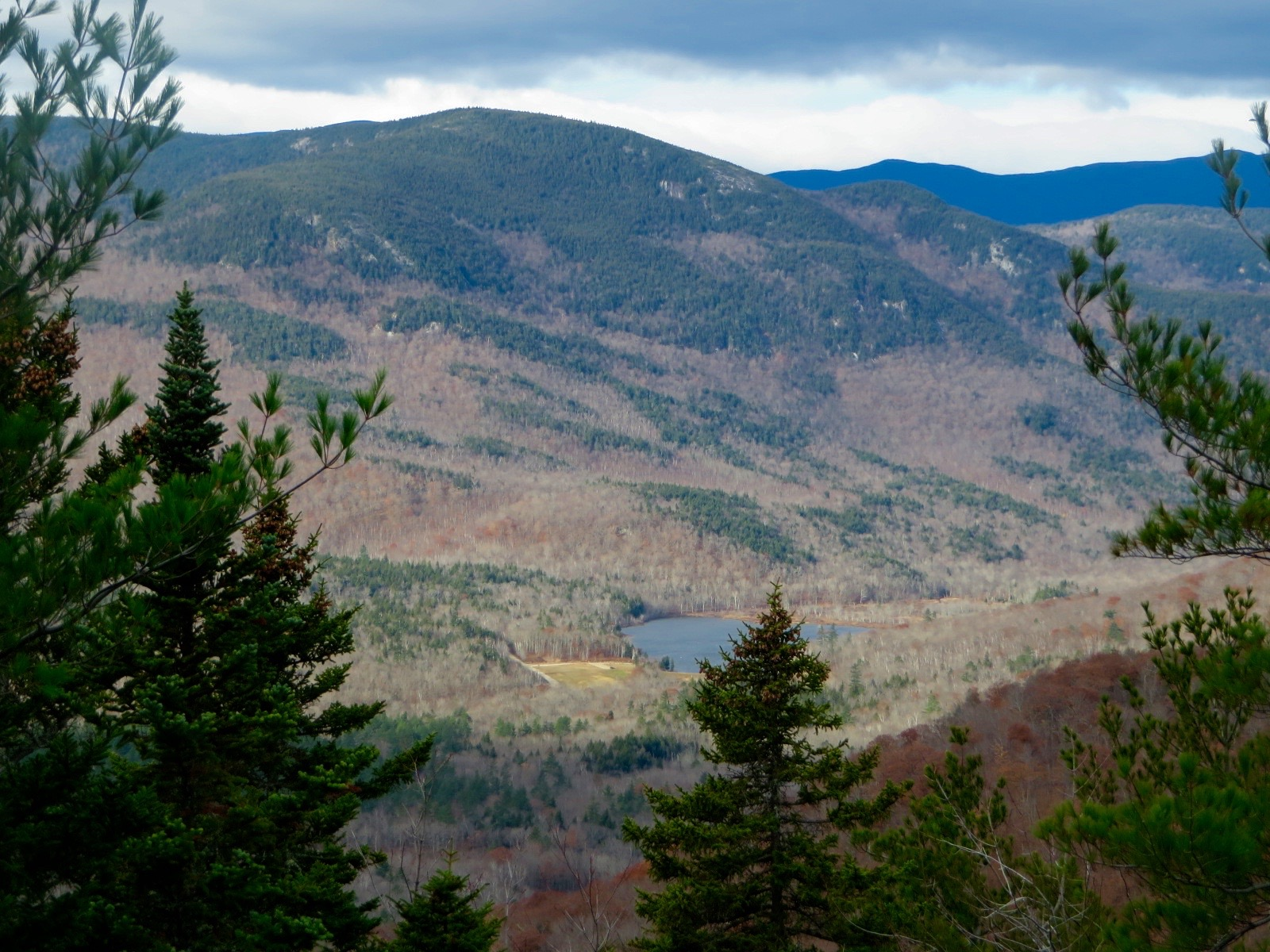
Mount Meader overlooking Basin Brook Pond

Mount Meader, elevation 2,782 feet (848 m), is a mountain in the Baldface-Royce Range, located in Coos County, New Hampshire. It is reached by the Basin Rim, Mount Meader, and Meader Ridge trails. It is flanked to the southwest by Eagle Crag and to the northeast by West Royce Mountain.
