= Speckled Mountain =

Mountain in Maine, United States

- Location within Maine

Highest point
- Elevation: 2,887 ft (880 m)
- Prominence: 1,486 ft (453 m) NAVD 88
- Coordinates: 44°17′28″N 70°57′16″W

Geography
- Location: Oxford County, Maine, U.S.
- Topo map: USGS Speckled Mountain

Speckled Mountain is a mountain located in western Maine. It can be ascended by the Bickford Brook, Spruce Hill, Cold Brook, Red Rock and Blueberry Ridge trails, and is a popular day hike. It is a part of the Caribou-Speckled Mountain Wilderness within the White Mountain National Forest. It is located near the AMC Cold River Camp.

== Nearby mountains ==
Mountains adjacent to Speckled Mountain include:

- Durgin Mountain
- Blueberry Mountain
- Red Rock Mountain
- Caribou Mountain
- Ames Mountain
