= Ellis River (New Hampshire) =

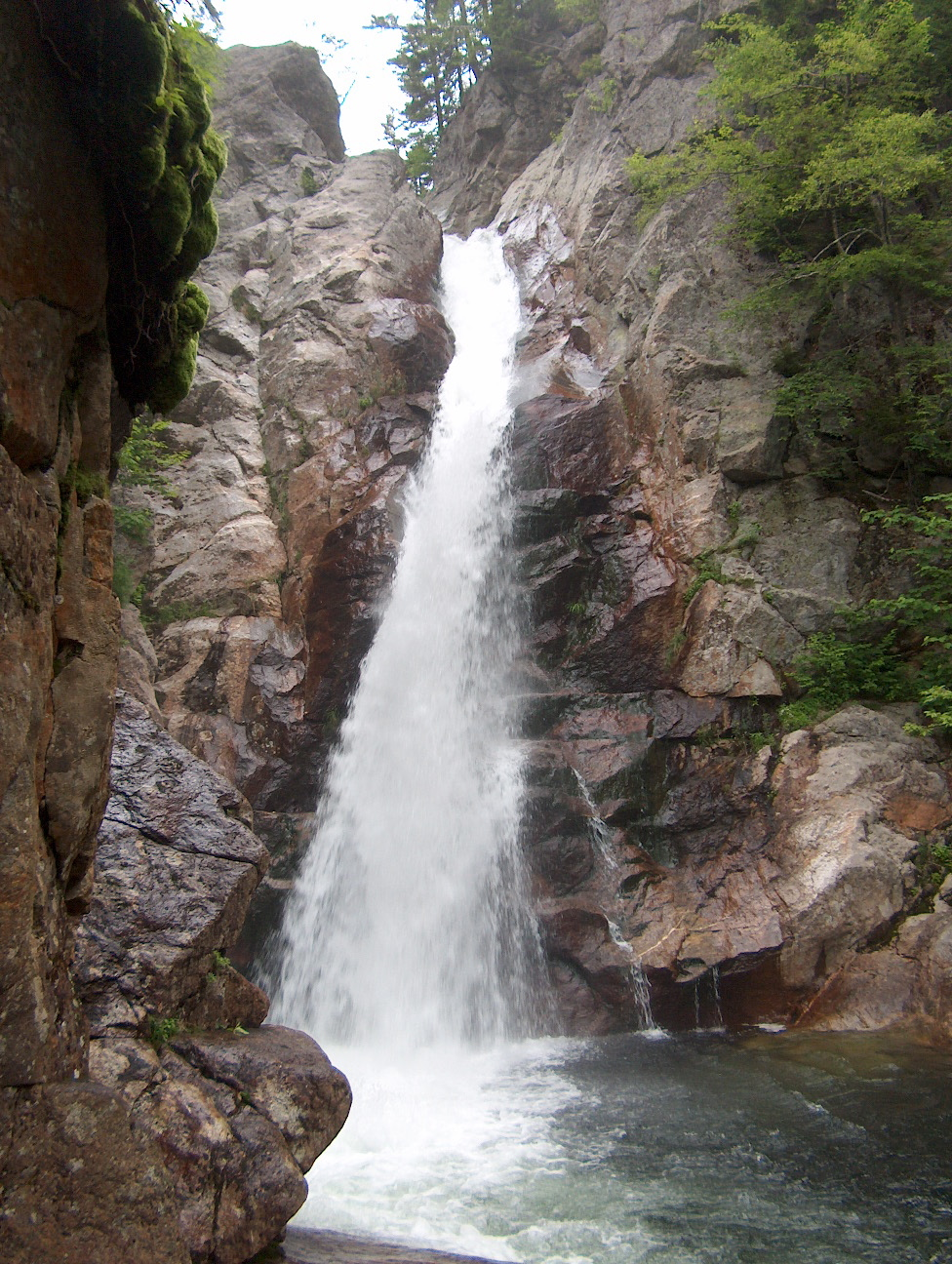
- Glen Ellis Falls on the Ellis River in Pinkham Notch

- Location within New Hampshire Location within the United States

Location
- Country: United States
- State: New Hampshire
- Counties: Coos, Carroll
- Towns: Jackson, Bartlett

Physical characteristics
- Source: Pinkham Notch
  - location: Pinkham's Grant
  - coordinates: 44°15′33″N 71°15′1″W
  - elevation: 2,018 ft (615 m)
- Mouth: Saco River
  - location: Glen
  - coordinates: 44°6′13″N 71°10′18″W
  - elevation: 516 ft (157 m)
- Length: 16.0 mi (25.7 km)

Basin features
- Tributaries
  - left: Wildcat Brook
  - right: Cutler River, Miles Brook, Meserve Brook, Spruce Brook

The Ellis River is a 16-mile-long (26 km) river in the White Mountains of New Hampshire in the United States. It is a tributary of the Saco River, which flows to the Atlantic Ocean in Maine.

The Ellis River rises in a wetland at the height of land in Pinkham Notch, at the eastern base of Mount Washington, the highest peak in the northeastern United States. Flowing south, it is quickly joined by the Cutler River flowing out of Tuckerman Ravine.

The river soon leaves the level ground at the high point of the notch by dropping 64 feet (20 m) over Glen Ellis Falls. The falls are a short walk from Route 16, the highway through the notch. A U.S. Forest Service parking area, not far from the top of the falls, gives access to a well-maintained, hard-surfaced, short trail hugging the river to a point at the top of the falls, where there is a lookout nearly straight down into the gorge, and then the trail proceeds by a steep descent of stairs to the deep pool at the base of the falls.

The river continues south into the town of Jackson, New Hampshire, through a gradually widening valley, where it is joined by Wildcat Brook. Leaving the small intervale at Jackson village, the Ellis River drops over a hydroelectric dam at Goodrich Falls and reaches the Saco River near the village of Glen in the town of Bartlett.

New Hampshire Route 16 follows the Ellis River for its entire length.

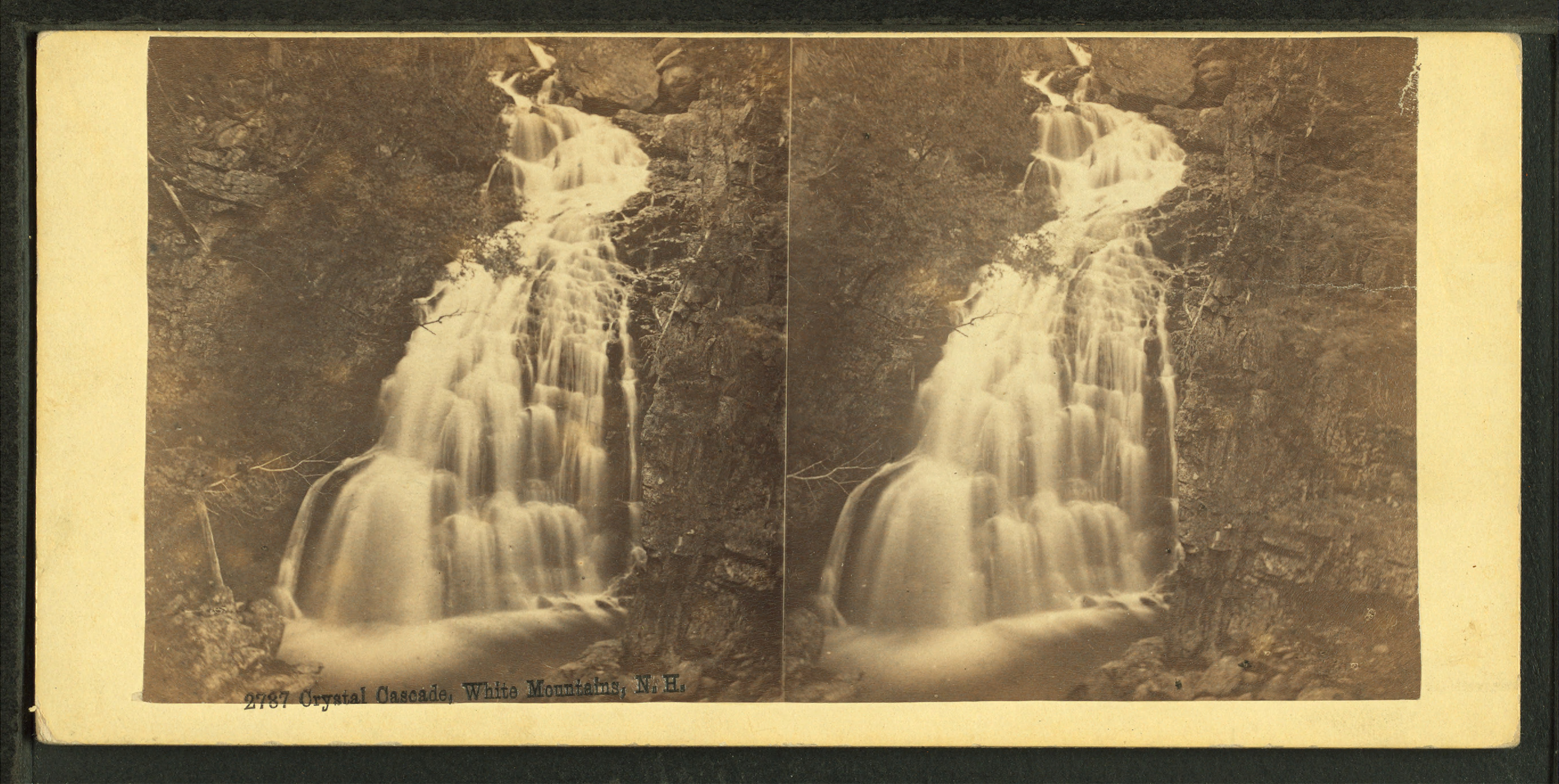
Stereoscopic image of Crystal Cascade by Bierstadt Brothers (early 1860s)

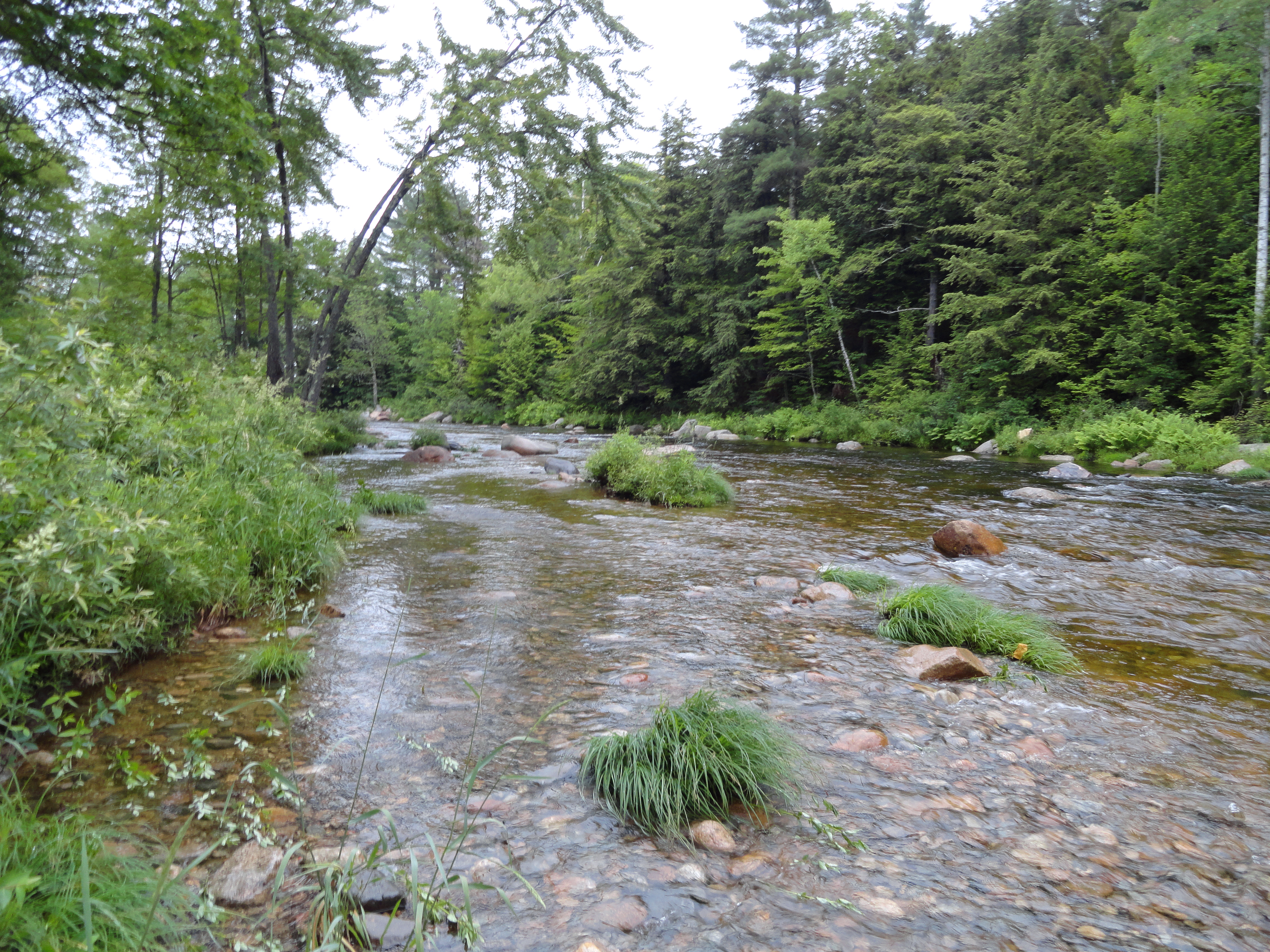
The river in Jackson, New Hampshire

== See also ==
- List of rivers of New Hampshire
