= Jackson, New Hampshire =

- Town
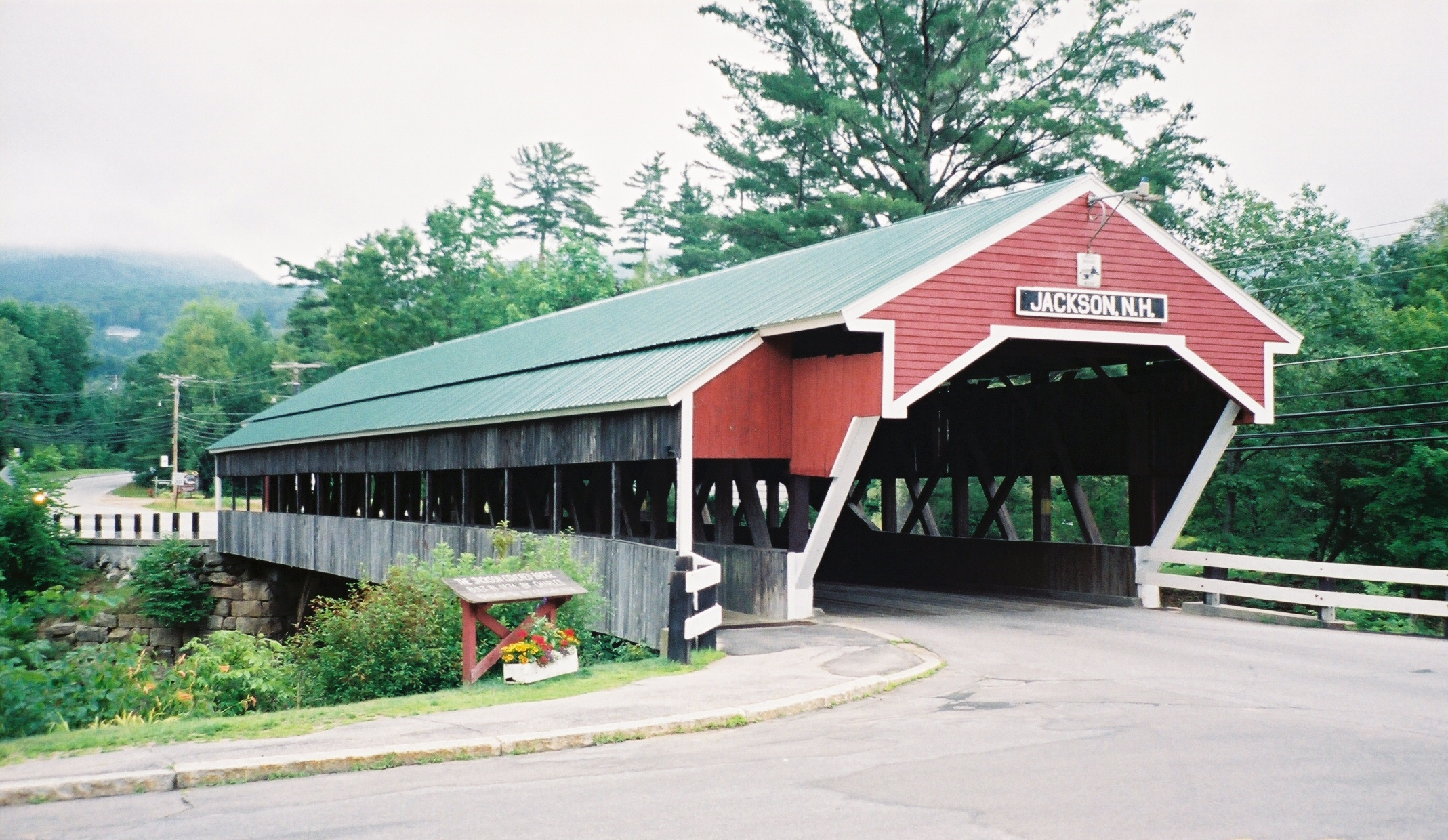
- Covered bridge in Jackson

- Seal
- Motto: "Bridging the Centuries"
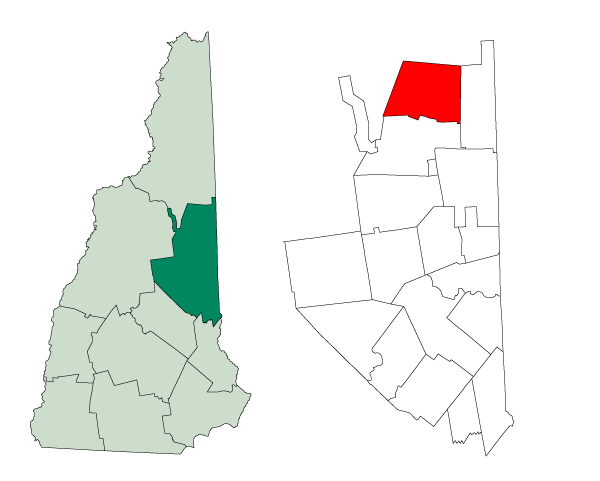
- Location in Carroll County, New Hampshire
- Coordinates: 44°09′25″N 71°10′48″W
- Country: United States
- State: New Hampshire
- County: Carroll
- Incorporated: December 4, 1800

Area
  - Total: 66.8 sq mi (173.0 km^{2})
  - Land: 66.8 sq mi (172.9 km^{2})
  - Water: 0.039 sq mi (0.1 km^{2}) 0.06%
- Elevation: 1,171 ft (357 m)

Population (2020)
  - Total: 1,028
  - Density: 15/sq mi (5.9/km^{2})
- Time zone: UTC-5 (Eastern)
  - Summer (DST): UTC-4 (Eastern)
- ZIP code: 03846
- Area code: 603
- FIPS code: 33-38260
- GNIS feature ID: 873632
- Website: www.jackson-nh.gov

Jackson is a town in Carroll County, New Hampshire, United States. The population was 1,028 at the 2020 census, and an estimated 1,082 in 2025, up from 816 in 2010. Jackson is a resort area in the White Mountains. Parts of the White Mountain National Forest are in the west, north and east.

== History ==
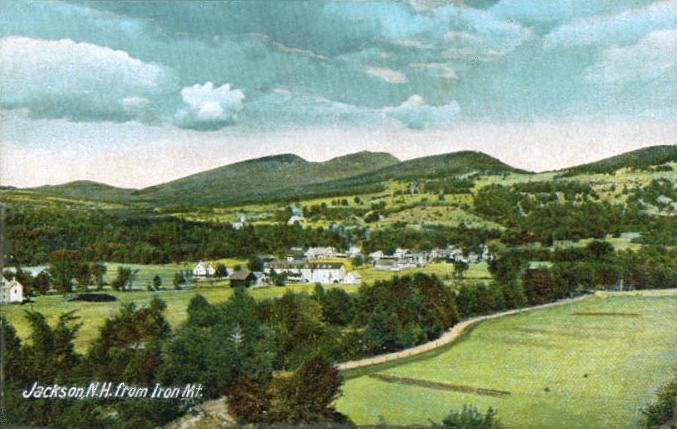
Bird's-eye view in 1907

Once consisting of several large land grants by colonial Governor John Wentworth, the town was first named "New Madbury", after the seacoast town of Madbury. In 1772, a road was built through Pinkham Notch, and the area was first settled in 1778 by Benjamin Copp and his family. In 1800, the community was renamed in honor of President John Adams, who was then in office. The name "Adams" stuck until the town was incorporated in 1829, when Andrew Jackson, the hero of the Battle of New Orleans, was inaugurated president. Governor Benjamin Pierce, a staunch backer of President Jackson, was influential in changing the name to Jackson. Only one vote was cast against the switch. In 2021, town residents voted to rededicate the town name to honor geologist Charles Thomas Jackson (1805–1880) rather than Andrew Jackson.

In 1847, artists of the White Mountain School began arriving in Jackson to paint the scenic beauty of the White Mountains. Others would follow, and in 1858, Joshua B. Trickey opened the Jackson Falls House. The Portland & Ogdensburg Railroad began service to Glen station at nearby Bartlett in the early 1870s, and several hotels were built to accommodate a growing infusion of tourists. Thorn Mountain House, built by Trickey in 1869, would evolve during the 1880s into Wentworth Hall, still in business today. Designed as a grouping of cottages around a main service building, the hotel included such amenities as a casino, built in 1886, and a hydroelectric plant, built in the 1890s. By the 1920s, 40 trains a day delivered passengers to Jackson.

The increasing use of automobiles, however, reduced travel by train, as vacationers could venture beyond the limits of rail service. Consequently, some grand 19th century hotels lost patrons and closed, although the town itself would never lose popularity. Jackson is one of the region's most picturesque villages, famous in part for Jackson Falls and Jackson X-C, a 100 kilometer cross-country skiing trail system, rated one of the best in the world. Wildcat Mountain, with an impressive view of Mount Washington, is a popular alpine skiing destination that was purchased by Vail Resorts in 2019. Jackson is perhaps best known for its red covered bridge (the Honeymoon Bridge), built in 1876, one of the most photographed in the state.

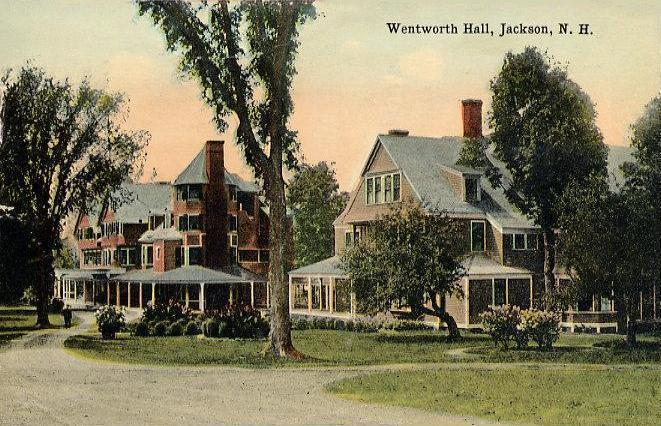
Wentworth Hall c. 1912

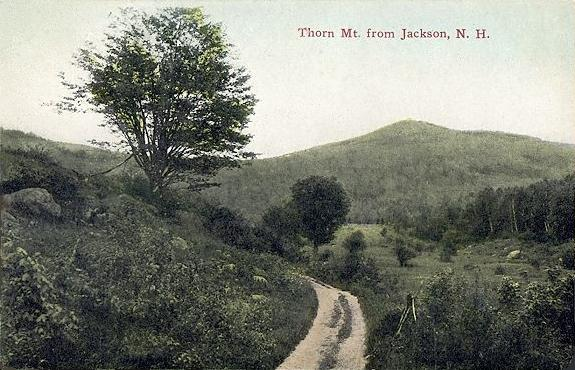
Thorn Mountain in 1912

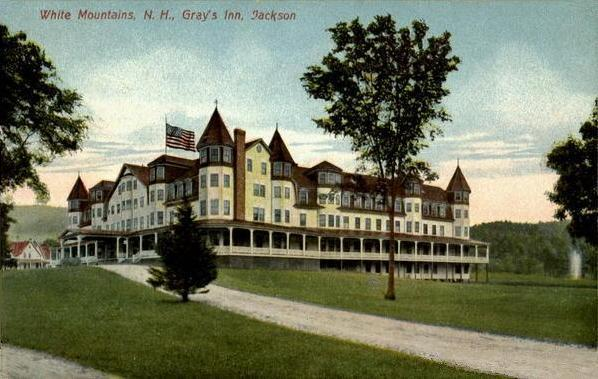
Gray's Inn in 1907

== Geography ==
According to the United States Census Bureau, the town has a total area of 66.8 square miles (173.0 km^{2}), of which 0.04 square miles (0.1 km^{2}), or 0.06%, are water. Jackson is drained by the Ellis River and its tributary Wildcat Brook. The highest point in Jackson is 3,870 feet (1,180 m) above sea level on Wildcat Ridge, at the northern boundary of town. The ridge continues to rise north of the town border to the summit of Wildcat Mountain—4,422 ft (1,348 m)—in the neighboring township of Bean's Purchase. Jackson lies fully within the Saco River watershed.

=== Adjacent municipalities ===
- Bean's Purchase (north)
- Chatham (east)
- Bartlett (south)
- Sargent's Purchase (west)
- Pinkham's Grant (northwest)

== Demographics ==
Historical population
Census	Pop.	Note	%±
1850	589		—
1860	631		7.1%
1870	474		−24.9%
1880	464		−2.1%
1890	579		24.8%
1900	624		7.8%
1910	452		−27.6%
1920	533		17.9%
1930	321		−39.8%
1940	409		27.4%
1950	344		−15.9%
1960	315		−8.4%
1970	404		28.3%
1980	642		58.9%
1990	678		5.6%
2000	835		23.2%
2010	816		−2.3%
2020	1,028		26.0%
2024 (est.)	1,070		4.1%
U.S. Decennial Census

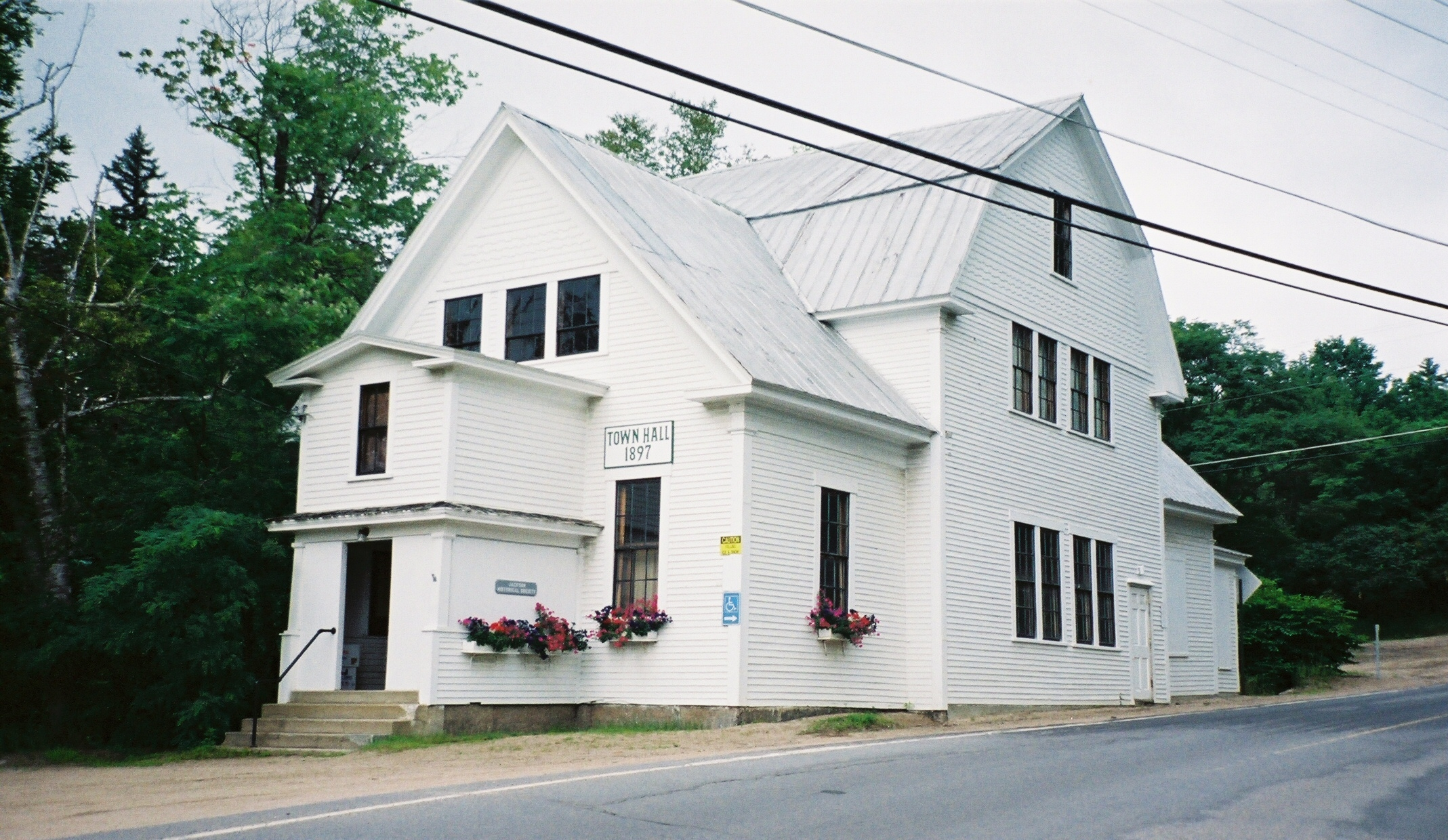
Old Town Hall in 2001

As of the census of 2000, there were 835 people, 377 households, and 240 families residing in the town. The population density was 12.5 inhabitants per square mile (4.8/km^{2}). There were 910 housing units at an average density of 13.6 per square mile (5.3/km^{2}). The racial makeup of the town was 99.28% White, 0.24% Native American, 0.12% Asian, 0.12% Pacific Islander, and 0.24% from two or more races. Hispanic or Latino of any race were 0.12% of the population.

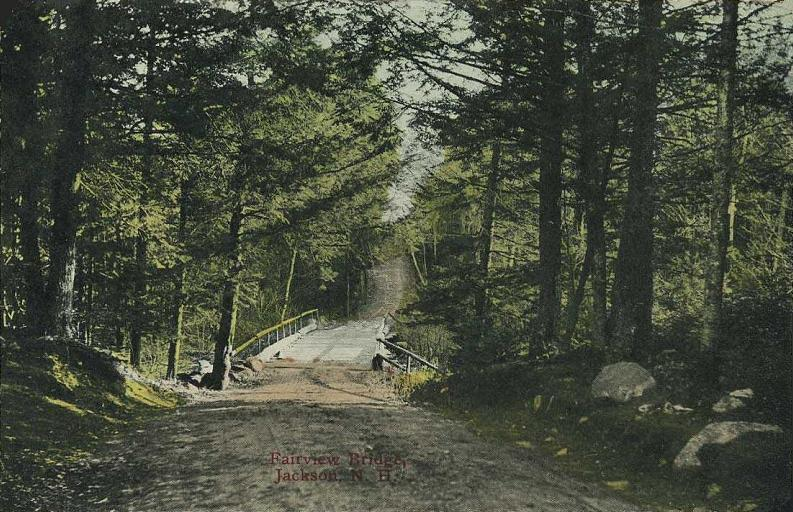
Fairview Bridge in 1912

There were 377 households, out of which 21.0% had children under the age of 18 living with them, 57.8% were married couples living together, 5.0% had a female householder with no husband present, and 36.1% were non-families. 27.1% of all households were made up of individuals, and 10.3% had someone living alone who was 65 years of age or older. The average household size was 2.18 and the average family size was 2.67.

In the town, the population was spread out, with 18.0% under the age of 18, 2.2% from 18 to 24, 28.7% from 25 to 44, 29.3% from 45 to 64, and 21.8% who were 65 years of age or older. The median age was 46 years. For every 100 females, there were 99.3 males. For every 100 females age 18 and over, there were 99.1 males.

The median income for a household in the town was $49,583, and the median income for a family was $59,327. Males had a median income of $32,813 versus $26,667 for females. The per capita income for the town was $25,718. About 6.1% of families and 8.1% of the population were below the poverty line, including 4.7% of those under age 18 and 14.5% of those age 65 or over.
