= Comparison of North American ski resorts =

Comparison table of North American ski resorts
Resort name and website	Nearest city	State/province	Peak elevation (ft)	Base elevation (ft)	Vertical drop (ft)	Skiable acreage	Total trails	Total lifts	Average annual snowfall (in)	Date statistics updated
Ski Bromont	Bromont	Quebec	1,854	590	1,264	450	141	9	190	January 29, 2025
Apex Mountain Resort	Penticton	British Columbia	7,197	5,197	2,000	1,112	79	4	236	January 29, 2025
Canyon Ski Area	Red Deer	Alberta	2,950	2,412	538	80	23	6	45	January 29, 2025
Fernie Alpine Resort	Fernie	British Columbia	7,000	3,450	3,550	2,500	142	10	360	January 29, 2025
Marble Mountain Ski Resort	Steady Brook	Newfoundland and Labrador	1,791	33	1,759	285	40	5	192	January 29, 2025
White Hills Ski Resort	Clarenville	Newfoundland and Labrador	1,227	482	745	55	27	2	100	January 29, 2025
Ski Wentworth	Wentworth	Nova Scotia	990	715	815	150	20	3	150	January 29, 2025
Mount Sima	Whitehorse	Yukon	3,900	2,857	1,043	92	15	3		January 29, 2025
Shames Mountain	Terrace	British Columbia	3,900	2,300	1,600	225	28	3	480	January 29, 2025
Castle Mountain Resort	Pincher Creek	Alberta	7,463	4,630	2,833	3,592	94	6	354	January 29, 2025
Bolton Valley	Waterbury	Vermont	3,150	2,100	1,704	300	71	6	312	January 29, 2025
Ski Cooper	Leadville	Colorado	11,700	10,500	1,200	470	60	5	260	January 29, 2025
Grand Targhee Resort	Alta	Wyoming	10,121	7,851	2,270	2,602	99	5	500	September 19, 2019
Stratton Mountain Resort	Winhall	Vermont	3,875	1,872	2,003	670	99	11	171	September 9, 2019
Mt. Rose Ski Tahoe	Reno	Nevada	9,700	8,260	1,800	1,200	60	8	396	November 7, 2019
Soldier Mountain	Fairfield	Idaho	7,177	5,756	1,400	1,180	36	2		November 7, 2019
Pomerelle Mountain Resort	Albion	Idaho	9,000	8,000	1,000	500	24	2	500	November 7, 2019
Schweitzer	Sandpoint	Idaho	6,400	4,000	2,400	2,900	92	7	300	November 7, 2019
Brundage Mountain	McCall	Idaho	7,803	5,882	1,921	1,920	46	5	320	November 7, 2019
Bogus Basin	Boise	Idaho	7,582	5,800	1,800	2,600	78	7	200	November 7, 2019
Sun Valley	Sun Valley	Idaho	9,150	5,750	3,400	2,563	121	18	220	November 7, 2019
Panorama Mountain Resort	Invermere	British Columbia	7,792	3,773	4,019	2,847	120	10	196	October, 2016
Whitefish Mountain Resort	Kalispell	Montana	6,817	4,464	2,353	3,000	105	14	300	November 16, 2023
Arizona Snowbowl	Flagstaff	Arizona	11,500	9,200	2,300	777	40	7	260	November 7, 2019
Telluride Ski Resort	Telluride	Colorado	13,150	8,725	4,425	2,000	147	18	309	December 11, 2019
Arapahoe Basin	Keystone	Colorado	13,050	10,520	2,530	1,428	147	9	350	November 5, 2019
Pajarito Mountain Ski Area	Los Alamos	New Mexico	10,440	9,000	1,440	750	44	5	163	December 11, 2019
Taos Ski Valley	Taos	New Mexico	12,481	9,200	3,281	1,294	110	14	300	September 9, 2019
Ski Santa Fe	Santa Fe	New Mexico	12,075	10,350	1,725	660	83	7	225	September 9, 2019
Big Sky Resort	Bozeman	Montana	11,166	6,800	4,350	5,850	320	40	400	November 24, 2023
Beartooth Basin Summer Ski Area	Red Lodge	Montana	10,900	9,900	1,000	600	9	2		November 16, 2023
Jackson Hole Mountain Resort	Teton Village	Wyoming	10,450	6,311	4,139	2,500	133	15	459	November 7, 2019
Loveland Ski Area	Georgetown	Colorado	13,010	10,800	2,210	1,800	94	11	422	November 7, 2019
Revelstoke Mountain Resort	Revelstoke	British Columbia	7,300	1,680	5,620	3,121	75	5	413	March 16, 2019
Mount Ashland Ski Area	Ashland	Oregon	7,533	6,383	1,150	220	23	5	265	September 29, 2019
Keystone Resort	Keystone	Colorado	12,408	9,280	3,128	3,149	139	20	235	March 5, 2024
Breckenridge Ski Resort	Breckenridge	Colorado	12,998	9,600	3,398	2,908	187	34	353	December 11, 2019
Palisades Tahoe	Truckee	California	9,050	6,200	2,850	6,000	277	39	450	November 24, 2023
Mammoth Mountain	Mammoth Lakes	California	11,053	7,953	3,100	3,500	150	28	420	December 11, 2019
Heavenly Mountain Resort	South Lake Tahoe	California	10,067	7,200	3,500	4,800	94	30	360	December 11, 2019
Mount Shasta Ski Park	Mount Shasta	California	9,200	7,800	1,435	425	32	4	275	December 11, 2019
Boreal	Soda Springs	California	7,700	7,200	500	380	41	8	400	December 11, 2019
Donner Ski Ranch	Norden	California	7,781	7,031	750	435	52	8	400	December 11, 2019
Homewood	Homewood	California	7,881	6,223	1,658	1,260	60	7	400	December 11, 2019
Kirkwood	Kirkwood	California	9,800	7,800	2,000	2,300	86	15	500	October 29, 2019
Northstar California	Truckee	California	8,610	6,330	2,280	2,904	93	19	350	December 11, 2019
Sierra-at-Tahoe	Twin Bridges	California	8,852	6,640	2,212	2,000	46	12	480	December 11, 2019
Sugar Bowl	Norden	California	8,383	6,883	1,500	1,500	94	13	500	December 11, 2019
Soda Springs	Soda Springs	California	7,325	6,673	652	200	15	2	400	December 11, 2019
Tahoe Donner	Truckee	California	7,350	6,750	600	120	10	3	400	December 11, 2019
Badger Pass	Yosemite National Park	California	8,000	7,200	800	90	10	5	300	December 11, 2019
Bear Valley	Angels Camp	California	8,500	6,600	1,900	1,280	67	10	359	December 11, 2019
Dodge Ridge	Sonora	California	8,200	6,600	1,600	832	62	12	300	December 11, 2019
June Mountain	June Lake	California	10,090	7,545	2,590	500	35	7	250	December 11, 2019
China Peak	Lakeshore	California	8,709	7,030	1,673	1,200	45	11	300	December 11, 2019
Alta Sierra	Wofford Heights	California	7,091	6,491	600		6	2	80	December 11, 2019
Buckhorn Ski and Snowboard Club	Three Points	California	7,903	7,203	680	40	5	2	180	April 20, 2012
Bear Mountain	Big Bear Lake	California	8,805	7,104	1,665	198	24	12	100	December 11, 2019
Mount Baldy Ski Lifts	Mount Baldy	California	8,600	6,500	2,100	800	26	4	170	December 11, 2019
Mount Waterman	Three Points	California	8,030	7,000	1,030	150	27	3	180	December 11, 2019
Mountain High	Wrightwood	California	8,200	6,600	1,600	290	59	13	132	December 11, 2019
Snow Summit	Big Bear Lake	California	8,174	6,965	1,209	240	30	14	100	December 11, 2019
Snow Valley Mountain Resort	Running Springs	California	7,841	6,800	1,041	240	29	12	150	December 11, 2019
Wolf Creek Ski Area	Pagosa Springs	Colorado	11,904	10,300	1,604	1,600	77	7	465	December 11, 2019
Kicking Horse Resort	Golden	British Columbia	8,218	3,900	4,314	3,486	120	3	295	March 16, 2019
Eldora Mountain Resort	Nederland	Colorado	10,600	9,400	1,200	680	53	12	300	December 11, 2019
Alyeska Resort	Girdwood	Alaska	3,939	250	2,500	1,400	73	9	643	November 7, 2019
Marmot Basin	Jasper	Alberta	8,570	5,570	3,000	1,675	86	8	160	September 19, 2019
Lake Louise Mountain Resort	Lake Louise	Alberta	8,650	5,400	3,250	4,200	139	9	180	February 14, 2014
Big White Ski Resort	Kelowna	British Columbia	7,606	4,950	2,656	2,800	119	16	294	January 29, 2025
Silver Star Mountain Resort	Vernon	British Columbia	6,282	3,789	2,500	3,269	132	12	275	February 4, 2025
Whistler Blackcomb	Whistler	British Columbia	7,494	2,140	5,280	8,171	200	26	404	December 23, 2017
Steamboat Springs	Steamboat Springs	Colorado	10,568	6,900	3,668	3,741	182	23	314	November 24, 2023
Copper Mountain (Colorado)	Frisco	Colorado	12,313	9,712	2,601	2,450	126	22	282	December 11, 2019
Vail Ski Resort	Vail	Colorado	11,570	8,120	3,450	5,289	195	31	354	March 29, 2023
Beaver Creek	Avon	Colorado	11,440	8,100	3,340	2,082	167	24	323	March 29, 2023
Winter Park Resort	Winter Park	Colorado	12,060	9,000	3,060	3,081	171	28	344	March 6, 2024
Saddleback Maine	Farmington	Maine	4,120	2,120	2,000	600	68	6	225	January, 15, 2025
Boyne Mountain	Boyne City	Michigan	1,152 ft (351 m)	719 ft (219 m)	433 ft (132 m)	385	60	10	140	February 20, 2025
Mountain Creek	Vernon Township	New Jersey	1,480	440	1,040	200	41	8	65	December 11, 2019
Blue Mountain	Collingwood	Ontario	1,498	756	720	364	43	12	109	May 29, 2026
Mt Bachelor	Bend	Oregon	9,065	5,700	3,365	4,318	101	11	462	September 29, 2019
Mount Hood Meadows	Portland	Oregon	7,300	4,523	2,777	2,150	85	11	430	December 11, 2019
Mont-Sainte-Anne	Beaupré	Quebec	2,625	575	2,050	450	65	13	187	
Mont Tremblant Resort	Mont Tremblant	Quebec	2,870	750	2,120	627	95	14	156	
Le Massif	Petite-Rivière-Saint-François	Quebec	2,645	118	2,527	410	48	4	248	
Brian Head	Brian Head	Utah	11,307	9,600	1,548	650	14	8	370	December 11, 2019
Park City Mountain Resort	Park City	Utah	10,000	6,900	3,100	6,700	348	43	360	December 11, 2019
Deer Valley	Park City	Utah	9,570	6,530	3,040	4,300	202	36	280	November 14, 2025
Brighton Ski Resort	Salt Lake City	Utah	10,500	8,755	1,745	1,050	66	6	500	December 11, 2019
Alta Ski Area	Salt Lake City	Utah	11,068	8,530	2,538	2,614	119	10	546	November 24, 2023
Snowbird	Salt Lake City	Utah	10,992	7,760	3,240	2,500	85	13	500	December 11, 2019
Smugglers' Notch	Jeffersonville	Vermont	3,640	1,030	2,610	1,000	78	16	288	December 11, 2019
Windham Mountain	Windham	New York	3,100	1,500	1,600	279	52	12	100	December 11, 2019
Hunter Mountain	Hunter	New York	3,200	1,600	1,600	240	58	10	120	December 11, 2019
Killington Ski Resort	Killington	Vermont	4,241	1,165	3,050	1,509	155	21	250	December 11, 2019
Okemo Mountain	Ludlow	Vermont	3,344	1,144	2,200	632	119	19	200	December 11, 2019
Stowe Mountain Resort	Stowe	Vermont	3,719	1,559	2,160	485	116	13	224	December 11, 2019
Sugarbush Resort	Warren	Vermont	4,083	1,483	2,600	508	111	16	269	December 11, 2019
Sugarloaf	Carrabassett Valley	Maine	4,237	1,417	2,820	1,360	154	14	200	December 11, 2019
Snowshoe Mountain	Marlinton	West Virginia	4,848	3,348	1,500	244	60	14	180	December 11, 2019
Banff Sunshine	Banff	Alberta	8,954	5,440	3,514	3,358	107	12	360	January 19, 2013
Mt. Norquay	Banff	Alberta	8,040	5,500	1,650	190	28	5	120	January 19, 2013
Grouse Mountain	North Vancouver	British Columbia	4,039	899	1,198	212	26	5	120	April 2, 2013
Mount Seymour	North Vancouver	British Columbia	4,150	935	1,083	200	23	5	394	April 2, 2013
Cypress Mountain	West Vancouver	British Columbia	4,724	2,985	2,001	600	53	6	245	April 2, 2013
Stevens Pass	Stevens Pass	Washington	5,845	4,061	1,800	1,125	37	10	450	December 11, 2019
Sun Peaks Resort	Kamloops	British Columbia	6,824	3,930	2,894	4,270	135	12	237	December 23, 2017
Crystal Mountain	Enumclaw	Washington	7,012	3,912	3,100	2,600	57	12	350	December 11, 2019
Red Mountain Resort	Rossland	British Columbia	6,807	3,887	2,919	4,200	110	7	300	February 26, 2019
Mt Baker	Glacier	Washington	5,089	3,500	1,589	1,000	31	10	641	August 18, 2023
Whiteface Mountain	Lake Placid	New York	4,650	1,220	3,430	314	87	11	168	December 11, 2019
Powder Mountain	Eden	Utah	9,422	6,900	3,380	5,000	167	9	360	December 11, 2019
Sugar Mountain Resort	Banner Elk	North Carolina	5,300	4,100	1,200	120	21	8	77	December 11, 2019
Beech Mountain Resort	Beech Mountain	North Carolina	5,506	4,675	831	95	17	8	84	December 11, 2019
Appalachian Ski Mountain	Blowing Rock	North Carolina	4,000	3,635	365	27	12	5	27	December 11, 2019
Cataloochee Ski Area	Maggie Valley	North Carolina	5,400	4,660	740	50	18	5	24	December 11, 2019
Sapphire Valley Ski Area	Sapphire	North Carolina	3,400	3,200	200	8	3	3	24	December 28, 2023
Wolf Ridge Ski Resort	Mars Hill	North Carolina	4,700	4,000	700	65	15	4	65	December 11, 2019
Aspen Highlands	Aspen	Colorado	11,675	8,040	3,635	1,024	118	5	300	March 5, 2024
Aspen Mountain	Aspen	Colorado	11,212	7,945	3,267	828	104	9	300	March 5, 2024
Buttermilk	Aspen	Colorado	9,900	7,870	2,030	454	43	5	200	March 5, 2024
Snowmass	Aspen	Colorado	12,510	8,110	4,400	3,342	98	20	300	March 5, 2023
Lee Canyon (Ski and Snowboard Resort)	Las Vegas	Nevada	11,289	8,510	860	385	27	3	161	December 11, 2019
Terry Peak	Lead	South Dakota	7,064	5,930	1,134	450	30	4	150	December 11, 2019
Mount Snow	Dover	Vermont	3,600	1,900	1,700	600	86	20	156	December 11, 2019
Wintergreen	Charlottesville	Virginia	3,515	2,512	1,003	129	26	5	35	December 11, 2019
Angel Fire Resort	Angel Fire	New Mexico	10,677	8,600	2,077	560	80	7	210	December 11, 2019
Bridger Bowl	Bozeman	Montana	8,700	6,100	2,600	2,000	75	11	350	November 16, 2023
Turner Mountain	Libby	Montana	5,952	3,842	2,110	1,000	22	1	200	November 16, 2023
Discovery	Anaconda	Montana	8,158	5,770	2,388	2,200	67	8	150	November 16, 2023
Great Divide	Helena	Montana	7,210	5,880	1,330	1,500	140	6	180	November 16, 2023
Showdown	Great Falls	Montana	8,200	6,800	1,400	640	36	4	240	November 16, 2023
Maverick Mountain	Dillon	Montana	8,820	6,800	2,020	350	24	2	200	November 16, 2023
Lost Trail Powder Mountain	Hamilton	Montana	8,200	6,400	1,800	1,800	60	8	325	November 16, 2023
Blacktail Mountain	Kalispell	Montana	6,780	5,340	1,440	1,000	26	4	250	November 16, 2023
Bear Paw Ski Bowl	Havre	Montana	5,280	4,200	1,080	80	11	2	140	November 16, 2023
Red Lodge Mountain	Red Lodge	Montana	9,416	7,016	2,400	1,635	70	7	250	November 16, 2023
Montana Snowbowl	Missoula	Montana	7,600	5,000	2,600	950	39	4	300	November 16, 2023
Teton Pass	Choteau	Montana	7,200	6,190	1,010	114	26	2	250	November 16, 2023
White Pass	Yakima	Washington	6,500	4,500	2,000	1,400	45	8	350	September 28, 2019
49 Degrees North	Spokane	Washington	5,774	3,923	1,851	2,325	82	6	300	September 28, 2019
Hurricane Ridge	Port Angeles	Washington	5,500	4,800	700		10	3	400	September 28, 2019
The Summit at Snoqualmie	North Bend	Washington	5,420	2,610	2,280	1,914	62	27	435	September 28, 2019
Ski Bluewood	Dayton	Washington	5,670	4,454	1,216	530	24	3	300	September 28, 2019
Mount Spokane	Spokane	Washington	5,889	3,818	2,071	1,704	52	8	300	September 28, 2019
Mission Ridge	Wenatchee	Washington	6,820	4,570	2,250	2,000	36	6	200	September 28, 2019
Loup Loup Ski Bowl	Twisp	Washington	5,280	4,040	1,240	550	10	3	150	September 28, 2019
Echo Valley	Chelan	Washington	3,900	3,000	900	70	6	4		September 28, 2019
Badger Mountain	Waterville	Washington	3,470	3,145	325	10	5	3	120	September 28, 2019
Leavenworth Ski Hill	Leavenworth	Washington	1,706	1,476	230	17	2	2		September 28, 2019
Meany Lodge	Easton	Washington			450	54	32	1		September 28, 2019
Sitzmark Lifts	Tonasket	Washington	4,950	4,300	650		11	2		September 28, 2019
Mount Eyak	Cordova	Alaska	1,200	400	800	100	10	2	350	September 28, 2019
Moose Mountain	Fairbanks	Alaska	1,985	685	1,300	200	40	0	70	September 28, 2019
Eaglecrest	Juneau	Alaska	2,750	1,130	1,620	640	34	4	350	September 28, 2019
Hilltop	Anchorage	Alaska	780	486	294	30	13	3	69	September 28, 2019
Arctic Valley	Anchorage	Alaska	4,000	2,500	1,500	320	24	3	250	September 28, 2019
Mount Aurora Skiland	Fairbanks	Alaska	2,435	1,408	1,027	530	46	2		September 28, 2019
White Pine	Pinedale	Wyoming	9,500	8,450	1,050	350	27	2	150	September 28, 2019
Snowy Range	Centennial	Wyoming	9,663	8,798	865	250	27	5	245	September 28, 2019
Snow King	Jackson	Wyoming	7,808	6,237	1,571	400	32	5	175	September 28, 2019
Pine Creek	Cokeville	Wyoming	8,200	6,875	1,325	370	30	2	150	September 28, 2019
Hogadon	Casper	Wyoming	8,000	7,370	630	60	27	2	140	September 28, 2019
Meadowlark Ski Lodge	Ten Sleep	Wyoming	9,500	8,500	1,000	300	14	3		September 28, 2019
Sleeping Giant	Cody	Wyoming	7,428	6,619	810	184	49	3	310	September 28, 2019
Elko Snobowl	Elko	Nevada	6,988	6,338	650	60	10	2	24	September 28, 2019
Diamond Peak	Incline Village	Nevada	8,540	6,700	1,840	655	30	6	225	September 28, 2019
Great Bear Ski Valley	Sioux Falls	South Dakota	1,530	1,352	178	220	14	4	150	September 28, 2019
Huff Hills	Mandan	North Dakota	2,150	1,725	425		21	3	40	September 28, 2019
Bottineau Winter Park	Bottineau	North Dakota	2,450	2,270	180	40	8	6	13	September 28, 2019
Elk Ridge	Williams	Arizona	8,150	7,500	650	37	10	2	150	September 28, 2019
Mount Lemmon Ski Valley	Tucson	Arizona	9,157	8,200	957	200	21	3	180	February 27, 2021
Sunrise Park	Greer	Arizona	11,100	9,200	1,900	800	65	9	250	September 28, 2019
Sandia Peak	Albuquerque	New Mexico	10,378	8,678	1,700	200	39	5	100	September 28, 2019
Ski Apache	Ruidoso	New Mexico	11,500	9,600	1,900	750	55	8	185	September 28, 2019
Sipapu	Taos	New Mexico	9,225	8,200	1,055	200	41	6	190	September 28, 2019
Red River	Red River	New Mexico	10,350	8,750	1,600	209	64	7	214	September 28, 2019
Kelly Canyon	Idaho Falls	Idaho	6,600	5,600	1,000	640	26	5	200	September 28, 2019
Pebble Creek	Pocatello	Idaho	8,560	6,360	2,200	1,100	54	3	250	September 28, 2019
Magic Mountain	Twin Falls	Idaho	7,240	6,540	700	120	11	4	230	September 28, 2019
Blizzard Mountain	Arco	Idaho	6,305	5,595	710			1		September 28, 2019
Rotarun	Hailey	Idaho	5,895	5,420	475		12	1		September 28, 2019
Chipmunk Hill	Challis	Idaho				30	1	1		September 28, 2019
Snowhaven	Grangeville	Idaho	5,600	5,200	400	40	9	2	60	September 28, 2019
Tamarack	Boise	Idaho	7,660	4,900	2,760	1,100	45	6	300	September 28, 2019
Cottonwood Butte	Cottonwood	Idaho	5,730	4,885	845	260	7	2	45	September 28, 2019
Bald Mountain	Pierce	Idaho	4,800	4,000	800	140	16	2	100	September 28, 2019
Silver Mountain	Coeur d'Alene	Idaho	6,297	4,100	2,197	1,600	67	8	300	September 28, 2019
Mohawk Mountain	Cornwall	Connecticut	1,600	960	640	107	25	8	24	September 28, 2019
Powder Ridge	Middlefield	Connecticut	803	377	426	80	19	7	60	September 28, 2019
Ski Sundown	Hartford	Connecticut	1075	450	625	70	16	5	45	September 28, 2019
Mount Southington	Waterbury	Connecticut	525	100	425	51	14	7	80	September 28, 2019
Yawgoo Valley	Exeter	Rhode Island	310	70	240	36	14	3	39	September 28, 2019
Frost Fire	Walhalla	North Dakota	1,400	1,070	330		10	3		September 28, 2019
Hidden Valley	Wildwood	Missouri	860	540	320	65	17	9	19	September 28, 2019
Snow Creek	Weston	Missouri	1,099	799	300	25	12	5	20	September 28, 2019
Ober Gatlinburg	Gatlinburg	Tennessee	3,300	2,700	600	38	10	4	9	September 28, 2019
Paoli Peaks	Paoli	Indiana	900	600	300	65	17	8	18	September 28, 2019
Perfect North Slopes	Lawrenceburg	Indiana	800	400	400	100	23	11	23	September 28, 2019
Alpine Valley	Chesterland	Ohio	1,500	1,260	240	72	11	5	120	September 28, 2019
Boston Mills/Brandywine	Peninsula	Ohio	871	531	240	79	18	16	54	September 28, 2019
Mad River	Bellafontaine	Ohio	1,460	1,160	300	144	23	12	36	September 28, 2019
Snow Trails	Mansfield	Ohio	1,475	1,175	300	80	17	7	52	September 28, 2019
Big Creek	Concord	Ohio	1,466	1,292	174	23	5	2	102	September 28, 2019
Wisp Ski Resort	McHenry	Maryland	3,115	2,145	700	132	34	12	100	September 28, 2019
Campgaw Mountain	Mahwah	New Jersey	726	450	276	23	12	5	45	September 28, 2019
Mountain Creek	Vernon	New Jersey	1,490	450	1,040	167	46	9	65	September 28, 2019
Cockaigne Resort	Cherry Creek	New York	2,022	1,592	430	100	11	3	175	
Big Rock	Presque Isle	Maine	1,590	670	920	60	27	3	100	September 29, 2019
Big Moose Mountain	Greenville	Maine	2,920	1,300	1,620	1,216	33	2	136	October 26, 2024
Mount Jefferson	Lee	Maine	775	343	432	160	13	2	75	September 29, 2019
New Hermon Mountain	Bangor	Maine	450	150	300	70	20	3	90	September 29, 2019
Camden Snow Bowl	Camden	Maine	1,080	235	845	100	17	3	50	September 29, 2019
Powderhouse Hill	Portland	Maine	240	120	120		3	1		September 29, 2019
Lost Valley	Auburn	Maine	480	240	240	45	27	4	99	September 29, 2019
Pleasant Mountain	Bridgton	Maine	1,900	600	1,300	245	44	6	110	September 29, 2019
Sunday River	Newry	Maine	3,140	800	2,340	870	153	18	155	September 29, 2019
Ski Mount Abraham	Bethel	Maine	1,990	940	1,050	650	44	5	115	September 29, 2019
Black Mountain of Maine	Rumford	Maine	2,380	1,000	1,380	300	46	2	120	September 29, 2019
Titcomb Mountain	Farmington	Maine	750	400	350	45	16	3	85	September 29, 2019
Spruce Mountain Ski Slope	Jay	Maine	310	10	300		12	3		September 29, 2019
Eaton Mountain	Waterville	Maine	840	220	620	130	18	2	72	September 29, 2019
Baker Mountain	Bingham	Maine			460		5	1		September 29, 2019
Blandford Ski Area	Blandford	Massachusetts	1,490	1,025	465	55	29	5	70	September 29, 2019
Berkshire East	Greenfield	Massachusetts	1,720	540	1,180	180	45	6	120	September 29, 2019
Ski Butternut	Great Barrington	Massachusetts	1,764	645	1,119	110	22	10	115	September 29, 2019
Jiminy Peak	Pittsfield	Massachusetts	2,375	1,125	1,140	170	45	8	110	September 29, 2019
Wachusett Mountain	Worcester	Massachusetts	2,006	1,006	1,000	110	22	7	100	September 29, 2019
Nashoba Valley	Boston	Massachusetts	422	182	240	59	17	9	55	September 29, 2019
Blue Hills Ski Area	Boston	Massachusetts	635	326	309	60	8	4		September 29, 2019
Otis Ridge Ski Camp	Otis	Massachusetts	1,700	1,300	400	55	11	5	70	September 29, 2019
Ski Bradford	Haverhill	Massachusetts	272	24	248	48	15	10		September 29, 2019
Ski Ward	Shrewsbury	Massachusetts	420	210	210	45	9	6	80	September 29, 2019
Bosquet Ski Area	Pittsfield	Massachusetts	1,818	1,068	750	200	23	5	83	September 29, 2019
Chestnut Mountain	Galena	Illinois	1,020	600	420	220	19	9	34	September 29, 2019
Snowstar Winter Sports Park	Moline	Illinois	790	528	262	28	14	6	38	September 29, 2019
Four Lakes Alpine Snowsports	Naperville	Illinois	500	400	100	9	7	6	24	September 29, 2019
Villa Olivia	Bartlett	Illinois	500	320	180	15	7	7	25	September 29, 2019
Mount Crescent	Omaha	Iowa	1,500	1,200	300	50	11	2	30	September 29, 2019
Seven Oaks	Boone	Iowa	975	800	175	35	11	4	40	September 29, 2019
Sleepy Hollows Sports Park	Des Moines	Iowa	938	800	138	80	8	2		September 29, 2019
Sundown Mountain	Dubuque	Iowa	1,059	584	475	55	21	6	45	September 29, 2019
Bryce Resort	Basye	Virginia	1,750	1,250	500	25	8	7	30	September 29, 2019
Massanutten Resort	Harrisonburg	Virginia	2,925	1,750	1,110	70	13	7	35	September 29, 2019
Homestead Resort	Hot Springs	Virginia	3,200	2,500	700	45	10	2	50	September 29, 2019
Canaan Valley Resort	Dryfork	West Virginia	4,280	3,430	850	91	39	4	150	September 29, 2019
Winterplace	Ghent	West Virginia	3,600	2,997	603	90	28	9	100	September 29, 2019
Oglebay Resort	Wheeling	West Virginia			168		1	1		September 29, 2019
Cloudmont Resort	Mentone	Alabama	1,800	1,650	150	9	2	2	0	September 29, 2019
Anthony Lakes	North Powder	Oregon	8,000	7,100	900	1,100	21	3	300	September 29, 2019
Cooper Spur	Hood River	Oregon	4,350	4,000	350	50	10	4	100	September 29, 2019
Ferguson Ridge	Joseph	Oregon	5,840	5,200	640	170	8	2	300	September 29, 2019
Hoodoo	Sisters	Oregon	5,703	4,668	1,035	806	32	5	360	September 29, 2019
Mount Hood Skibowl	Government Camp	Oregon	5,027	3,500	1,527	960	65	9	300	September 29, 2019
Spout Springs	Tollgate	Oregon	5,450	4,920	530	200	17	2	130	September 29, 2019
Timberline Summit Ski Area	Government Camp	Oregon	4,306	4,000	306	70	3	2	150	September 29, 2019
Timberline Lodge	Government Camp	Oregon	8,540	4,000	4,540	1,430	35	9	540	July 31, 2021
Warner Canyon	Lakeview	Oregon	6,003	5,271	732	200	21	1	50	September 29, 2019
Willamette Pass	Oakridge	Oregon	6,683	5,120	1,563	555	29	6	430	September 29, 2019
Crested Butte	Crested Butte	Colorado	12,170	9,115	3,055	1,547	121	16	300	September 30, 2019
Echo Mountain	Evergreen	Colorado	10,650	10,050	600	226	13	2	275	September 30, 2019
Granby Ranch	Granby	Colorado	9,202	8,202	1000	406	40	5	220	September 30, 2019
Hesperus	Durango	Colorado	8,888	8,200	688	60	26	1	150	September 30, 2019
Howelson Hill	Steamboat Springs	Colorado	7,136	6,696	440	50	17	4	150	September 30, 2019
Kendall Mountain	Silverton	Colorado	9,540	9,300	240	16	11	1	200	September 30, 2019
Monarch	Salida	Colorado	11,960	10,790	1,170	800	63	5	400	September 30, 2019
Powderhorn Resort	Grand Junction	Colorado	9,850	8,200	1,650	1,600	63	5	250	September 30, 2019
Purgatory Resort	Durango	Colorado	10,822	8,793	2,029	1,200	85	10	260	September 30, 2019
Silverton Mountain	Silverton	Colorado	13,487	10,400	3,087	1,819	48	1	450	September 30, 2019
Sunlight Mountain	Glenwood Springs	Colorado	9,895	7,885	2,010	470	67	3	250	September 30, 2019
Cranor Hill	Gunnison	Colorado	8,500	8,100	400	45	4	1	75	September 30, 2019
Lake City	Lake City	Colorado	8,850	8,600	250	14	7	1		September 30, 2019
Beaver Mountain	Logan	Utah	8,800	7,200	1,600	667	47	5	400	September 30, 2019
Cherry Peak	Richmond	Utah	7,050	5,775	1,265	200	29	3	322	September 30, 2019
Eagle Point	Beaver	Utah	10,600	9,100	1,500	650	40	5	400	September 30, 2019
Nordic Valley	Ogden	Utah	6,400	5,440	960	140	23	4	300	September 30, 2019
Snowbasin	Huntsville	Utah	9,465	6,450	3,015	3,000	118	13	325	November 24, 2023
Solitude Mountain	Salt Lake City	Utah	10,488	7,988	2,500	1,200	80	8	500	September 30, 2019
Sundance Mountain	Provo	Utah	8,250	6,100	2,150	450	44	5	320	September 30, 2019
Afton Alps	Afton	Minnesota	700	350	350	300	50	22	60	October 1, 2019
Andes Tower Hills	Kensington	Minnesota	1,620	1,330	290	35	15	6	55	October 1, 2019
Buck Hill	Burnsville	Minnesota	1,211	949	262	45	16	9	60	October 1, 2019
Buena Vista Ski Area	Bemidji	Minnesota	1,510	1280	230	30	16	5	78	October 1, 2019
Chester Bowl Park	Duluth	Minnesota	875	700	175	6	5	1	100	October 1, 2019
Coffee Mill Ski Area	Wabasha	Minnesota	1,150	725	425	40	14	3	48	October 1, 2019
Detroit Mountain	Detroit Lakes	Minnesota	1,607	1,443	210	45	21	8		October 1, 2019
Giants Ridge	Biwabik	Minnesota	1,972	1,472	500	202	35	7	85	October 1, 2019
Hyland Hills	Bloomington	Minnesota	1,075	900	175	35	13	6	60	October 1, 2019
Lutsen Mountains	Lutsen	Minnesota	1,678 ft (511 m)	905 ft (276 m)	773 ft (236 m)	593	95	9	115	October 1, 2019
Mount Itasca	Grand Rapids	Minnesota								October 1, 2019
Mount Kato	Mankato	Minnesota	840	600	240	55	19	11	50	October 1, 2019
Powder Ridge	Kimball	Minnesota	850	540	310	60	15	6	45	October 1, 2019
Mount Ski Gull	Nisswa	Minnesota	1,515	1,285	230	40	10	5	50	October 1, 2019
Spirit Mountain	Duluth	Minnesota	1,298	620	678	175	22	8	90	October 1, 2019
Welch Village	Red Wing	Minnesota	1,060	700	360	140	60	11	45	October 1, 2019
Wild Mountain	Taylors Falls	Minnesota	1,113	813	300	100	26	9	50	October 1, 2019
Abenaki Ski Area	Wolfeboro	New Hampshire	815	600	215	18	7	2		December 8, 2019
Arrowhead Recreation Area	Claremont	New Hampshire			120	225	9	2		December 8, 2019
Attitash Mountain Resort	North Conway	New Hampshire	2,350	600	1,750	311`	68	9	120	December 8, 2019
Black Mountain Ski Area	Jackson	New Hampshire	2,350	1,250	1,100	143	40	5	125	December 8, 2019
Bretton Woods	Bretton Woods	New Hampshire	3,100	1,600	1,500	464	62	10	200	December 8, 2019
Cannon Mountain Ski Area	Franconia	New Hampshire	4,180	1,850	2,330	265	73	10	160	December 8, 2019
Campton Mountain	Campton	New Hampshire	1,505	1,192	313			2		December 8, 2019
Cranmore Mountain Resort	North Conway	New Hampshire	2,000	600	1,200	200	54	10	150	December 8, 2019
Crotched Mountain Ski and Ride	Manchester	New Hampshire	2066	1050	1,016	75	23	5	105	December 8, 2019
Dartmouth Skiway	Lyme	New Hampshire	1,943	975	968	104	30	4	100	December 8, 2019
Veterans Memorial Recreation Area	Franklin	New Hampshire			220		10	2		December 8, 2019
Granite Gorge	Keene	New Hampshire	1,325	935	390	150	19	3		December 8, 2019
Gunstock Mountain Resort	Laconia	New Hampshire	2,267	867	1,400	227	55	6	120	December 8, 2019
Kanc Recreation Area	Lincoln	New Hampshire	1,080	859	221	7	2	1		December 8, 2019
King Pine Ski Area	Madison	New Hampshire	850	500	350	48	17	6	120	December 8, 2019
Loon Mountain Resort	Lincoln	New Hampshire	3,050	950	2,100	370	61	12	163	December 8, 2019
McIntyre Ski Area	Manchester	New Hampshire	510	340	169	37	10	5		December 8, 2019
Mt. Eustis Ski Hill	Littleton	New Hampshire	1,373	1,133	240			1		December 8, 2019
Mount Prospect Ski Tow	Lancaster	New Hampshire	1,700	1,400	300			1		December 8, 2019
Mount Sunapee Resort	Claremont	New Hampshire	2,743	1,230	1,513	230	66	11	100	December 8, 2019
Pats Peak Ski Area	Henniker	New Hampshire	1,460	690	770	103	28	11	100	December 8, 2019
Ragged Mountain Resort	Danbury	New Hampshire	2250	1000	1,250	250	57	6	100	December 8, 2019
Red Hill Ski Area	Moultonborough	New Hampshire	820	610	210		9	1		December 8, 2019
Storrs Hill Ski Area	Lebanon	New Hampshire	580	280	300	20	3	1		December 8, 2019
Tenney Mountain Resort	Plymouth	New Hampshire	2,149	749	1,400	110	45	3	140	December 8, 2019
Waterville Valley Resort	Waterville Valley	New Hampshire	3,840	1,820	2,020	220	50	11	150	December 8, 2019
Whaleback Mountain	Enfield	New Hampshire	1,800	1,100	700	85	30	4	110	December 8, 2019
Wildcat Mountain	Jackson	New Hampshire	4,062	1,950	2,112	225	48	5	207	December 8, 2019
Bear Creek Mountain Resort	Macungie	Pennsylvania	1,100	590	510	86	23	7	30	December 9, 2019
Blue Knob All Seasons Resort	Claysburg	Pennsylvania	3,146	2,074	1,072	100	34	6	120	December 9, 2019
Blue Mountain Ski Area	Palmerton	Pennsylvania	1,540	458	1,082	164	39	13	33	December 9, 2019
Boyce Park Four Seasons Lodge	Plum	Pennsylvania	1,245	1,115	130	25	9	5		December 9, 2019
Camelback Mountain Resort	Scranton	Pennsylvania	2,130	1,330	800	166	35	16	50	December 9, 2019
Elk Mountain Ski Resort	Scranton	Pennsylvania	2,667	1,742	925	180	27	7	60	December 9, 2019
Hidden Valley Resort	Hidden Valley	Pennsylvania	2,875	2,405	470	110	26	11	140	December 9, 2019
Jack Frost - Big Boulder Ski Area	White Haven	Pennsylvania	2,000	1,400	600	145	35	22	50	December 9, 2019
Laurel Mountain Ski Resort	Ligonier	Pennsylvania	2,800	2,000	800	70	20	2		December 9, 2019
Liberty Mountain Resort	Gettysburg	Pennsylvania	1,190	570	620	100	22	9	31	December 9, 2019
Mount Pleasant of Edinboro	Edinboro	Pennsylvania	1,550	1,200	350	35	10	2	150	December 9, 2019
Seven Springs Mountain Resort	Seven Springs	Pennsylvania	2,994	2,240	750	285	40	14	150	December 9, 2019
Shawnee Mountain Ski Area	East Stroudsburg	Pennsylvania	1,351	700	651	125	23	9	50	December 9, 2019
Ski Big Bear	Lackawaxen	Pennsylvania	1,250	600	650	26	18	7	69	December 9, 2019
Denton Hill State Park	Ulysses	Pennsylvania	2,460	1,800	660			5		December 9, 2019
Roundtop Mountain Resort	Lewisberry	Pennsylvania	1,335	755	600	103	20	7	30	December 9, 2019
Spring Mountain Adventure	Schwenksville	Pennsylvania	528	78	450	45	9	6	20	December 9, 2019
Ski Sawmill Resort	Morris	Pennsylvania	2,215	1,700	515	15	14	5	24	December 9, 2019
Montage Mountain Resorts	Scranton	Pennsylvania	1,960	960	1000	140	26	9	60	December 9, 2019
Tussey Mountain Ski and Recreation	State College	Pennsylvania	1,750	1,230	520	38	7	3	41	December 9, 2019
Whitetail Resort	Clear Spring	Pennsylvania	1,800	865	935	109	25	9	40	December 9, 2019
Alpine Valley Resort	Elkhorn	Wisconsin	1,040	820	220	90	20	12	80	December 9, 2019
Bruce Mound Winter Sports Area	Merrillan	Wisconsin	1,375	1,000	375	40	12	5	42	December 9, 2019
Camp 10 Ski Area	Rhinelander	Wisconsin	1,740	1,510	230		15	4		December 9, 2019
Cascade Mountain	Portage	Wisconsin	1,270	820	450	175	47	11	56	December 9, 2019
Christie Mountain	Bruce	Wisconsin	1,650	1,300	350	45	30	5	48	December 9, 2019
Christmas Mountain	Wisconsin Dells	Wisconsin	1,250	1,000	250	40	16	3	20	December 9, 2019
The Rock Snowpark	Milwaukee	Wisconsin	925	700	225	75	10	5		December 9, 2019
Devil's Head Resort	Baraboo	Wisconsin	1,420	930	490	268	28	10	55	December 9, 2019
Granite Peak Ski Area	Wausau	Wisconsin	1,950	1,250	700	220	75	7	75	December 9, 2019
Kettlebowl Ski Area	Antigo	Wisconsin	1,780	1,455	325		7	5		December 9, 2019
Kewaunee Winter Park	Kewaunee	Wisconsin	740	580	160		5	1		December 9, 2019
Keyes Peak Ski Hill	Florence	Wisconsin	1,480	1,250	230		5	2	60	December 9, 2019
Little Switzerland Ski Area	Slinger	Wisconsin	1,269	1,069	200	50	18	8	45	December 9, 2019
Mont Du Lac Resort	Superior	Wisconsin	920	640	270	10	11	2	55	December 9, 2019
Grand Geneva Resort and Spa	Lake Geneva	Wisconsin	1000	789	211	30	20	5	25	December 9, 2019
Mount Ashwabay Ski and Recreation Area	Bayfield	Wisconsin			317	65	13	2		December 9, 2019
Mount La Cross	La Crosse	Wisconsin	1,010	594	516	100	19	4	40	December 9, 2019
Navarino Hills	Shiocton	Wisconsin	885	785	100			4		December 9, 2019
Nordic Mountain	Wild Rose	Wisconsin	1,137	872	265	60	18	7	80	December 9, 2019
Nutt Hill Ski Area	Plymouth	Wisconsin			100	10	2	1		December 9, 2019
Powers Bluff County Park and Winter Recreation Area	Arpin	Wisconsin	1,430	1,180	250		3	2		December 9, 2019
Standing Rocks County Park and Winter Recreation Area	Portage	Wisconsin			125		5	1		December 9, 2019
Sunburst Winter Sports Park	West Bend	Wisconsin	1,100	866	214	40	12	9	50	December 9, 2019
Triangle Sports Area	Green Bay	Wisconsin	710	640	70		2	3		December 9, 2019
Trollhaugen	Dresser	Wisconsin	1,200	920	280	86	24	10	50	December 9, 2019
Tyrol Basin	Mount Horeb	Wisconsin	1,130	870	260	30	16	6	41	December 9, 2019
Whitecap Mountains Resort	Upson	Wisconsin	1,759	1,449	310	208	43	5	200	February 15, 2025
Whitetail Ridge Ski Area	Fort McCoy	Wisconsin	1,050	865	185			1		December 9, 2019
Wilmot Mountain Ski Resort	Wilmot	Wisconsin	960	770	190	120	23	11	48	December 9, 2019
Alpine Valley	White Lake	Michigan	1,211 ft (369 m)	958 ft (292 m)	253 ft (77 m)	40	25	14	20	February 11, 2025
Big Powderhorn Mountain Resort	Bessemer	Michigan	1,631 ft (497 m)	1,214 ft (370 m)	417 ft (127 m)	200	45	10	214	February 22, 2025
Bittersweet Ski Resort	Otsego	Michigan	1,007 ft (307 m)	712 ft (217 m)	295 ft (90 m)	82	20	12	90	January 9, 2026
Snowriver Mountain Resort	Bessemer	Michigan	1,743 ft (531 m)	1,201 ft (366 m)	543 ft (166 m)	355	56	17	205	February 13, 2025
The Highlands at Harbor Springs	Harbor Springs	Michigan	1,306 ft (398 m)	794 ft (242 m)	512 ft (156 m)	385	55	7	140	February 22,2025
Caberfae Peaks	Cadillac	Michigan	1,529 ft (466 m)	1,191 ft (363 m)	338 ft (103 m)	95	34	5	140	February 22, 2025
Cannonsburg Ski Area	Belmont	Michigan	853 ft (260 m)	689 ft (210 m)	164 ft (50 m)	56	21	10	100	February 22, 2025
Crystal Mountain	Thompsonville	Michigan	1,119 ft (341 m)	794 ft (242 m)	325 ft (99 m)	180	58	8	132	February 22, 2025
Hickory Hills Ski Area	Traverse City	Michigan	984 ft (300 m)	771 ft (235 m)	213 ft (65 m)	32	8	5		February 23, 2025
The Homestead	Glen Arbor	Michigan	879 ft (268 m)	686 ft (209 m)	183 ft (56 m)	23	15	5	150	February 23, 2015
Marquette Mountain Ski Area	Marquette	Michigan	1,299 ft (396 m)	778 ft (237 m)	521 ft (159 m)	139	25	4	117	February 23, 2025
Mont Ripley Ski Area	Hancock	Michigan	1,066 ft (325 m)	646 ft (197 m)	420 ft (130 m)	67	25	4	275	February 23, 2025
Mount Bohemia	Mohawk	Michigan	1,457 ft (444 m)	640 ft (200 m)	817 ft (249 m)	363	102	2	273	February 12, 2025
Mount Brighton	Brighton	Michigan	1,115 ft (340 m)	935 ft (285 m)	180 ft (55 m)	55	26	13	60	March 25, 2025
Mount Holiday Ski and Recreational Area	Traverse City	Michigan	860	678	182	45	12	4	120	February 15, 2025
Mount McSauba	Charlevoix	Michigan	743	607	125	4	10	4		February 15, 2025
Mount Zion Ski Hill	Ironwood	Michigan	1,712	1,422	290	20	9	2		February 15, 2025
Mulligan's Hollow Ski Bowl	Grand Haven	Michigan	754	638	116	10	7	5	60	February 15, 2025
Norway Mountain Resort	Norway	Michigan	1,312 ft (400 m)	1,007 ft (307 m)	305 ft (93 m)	103	17	6	100	March 25, 2025
Nub's Nob Ski Area	Harbor Springs	Michigan	1,319 ft (402 m)	912 ft (278 m)	407 ft (124 m)	255	53	10	123	March 25, 2025
Otsego Club and Resort	Gaylord	Michigan	1,385 ft (422 m)	1,076 ft (328 m)	309 ft (94 m)	132	30	5	150	March 26, 2025
Mt Holly	Holly	Michigan	1,243 ft (379 m)	964 ft (294 m)	279 ft (85 m)	60	20	7		March 25, 2025
Pine Knob	Clarkston	Michigan	1,283 ft (391 m)	1,027 ft (313 m)	256 ft (78 m)	45	14	6		March 26, 2025
Pine Mountain Resort	Iron Mountain	Michigan	1,519 ft (463 m)	1,148 ft (350 m)	371 ft (113 m)	75	31	4	60	March 26, 2025
Porcupine Mountains	Ontonagon	Michigan	1,358 ft (414 m)	735 ft (224 m)	623 ft (190 m)	220	19	3	200	July 19, 2025
Shanty Creek Resort	Bellaire	Michigan	1,168 ft (356 m)	830 ft (250 m)	341 ft (104 m)	70	42	8	160	January 9, 2025
Ski Brule	Stambaugh	Michigan	1,845	1,538	307	90	17	11	150	February 12, 2025
Snow Snake Mountain Ski Area	Harrison	Michigan	1,230	1,020	210	40	12	6		February 15, 2025
Timber Ridge	Gobles	Michigan	922	736	186	50	16	8		February 15, 2025
Treetops Resort	Gaylord	Michigan	1,194	1,038	156	80	23	5	175	February 15, 2025
Belleyare Ski Center	Kingston	New York	3,429	2,024	1,405	173	52	8	141	December 10, 2019
Gore Mountain Ski Resort	Glens Falls	New York	3,600	1,000	2,600	428	109	15	150	December 10, 2019
Holiday Valley	Buffalo	New York	2,250	1,500	750	290	58	13	180	December 10, 2019
Peek'n Peak Resort	Erie	New York	1,800	1,400	400	130	27	9	105	December 10, 2019
Catamount Ski Area	Great Barrington	New York	2,000	1,000	1,000	119	36	7	75	December 10, 2019
Greek Peak Mountain Resort	Virgil	New York	2,200	1,148	952	220	55	9	122	December 10, 2019
Titus Mountain Family Ski Center	Malone	New York	2,025	825	1,200	380	50	10	150	December 10, 2019
Kissing Bridge	Glenwood	New York	1,700	1,150	550	700	39	10	120	December 10, 2019
Holiday Mountain	Monticello	New York	1,550	1,150	400	37	9	4	50	December 9, 2019
Bristol Mountain Ski Resort	Rochester	New York	2,150	1,000	1,150	160	35	6	130	December 9, 2019
Buffalo Ski Center	Colden	New York	3,429	2,025	500	225	43	6		December 9, 2019
Big Tupper Ski Area	Tupper Lake	New York								December 9, 2019
Hickory Ski Center		New York								December 9, 2019
Four Season Ski Center	Fayetteville	New York	604	545	59	12	4	2		December 10, 2019
Maple Ski Ridge	Schenectady	New York	1,200	750	450	25	10	3		December 10, 2019
McCauley Mountain Ski Center	Old Forge	New York	2,280	1,647	633	70	21	5	200	December 10, 2019
Mount Pisgah Ski Area	Saranac Lake	New York	2,060	1,770	290	15	5	1		December 10, 2019
Beartown Ski Area	Plattburgh	New York	1,000	850	150	32	9	2		December 10, 2019
Mount Peter	Warwick	New York	1,250	800	450	69	14	5	50	December 10, 2019
Oak Mountain	Speculator	New York	2,400	1,650	750	46	22	4	120	December 10, 2019
Royal Mountain Ski Area	Johnstown	New York	1,800	1,250	550	35	14	3	90	December 10, 2019
Song Mountain Resort	Tully	New York	1,940	1,240	700	93	24	5	125	December 10, 2019
Snow Ridge Ski Resort	Turin	New York	2,000	1,350	650	130	21	6	230	December 10, 2019
Labrador Mountain	Truxton	New York	1,825	1,125	700	250	23	4	125	December 10, 2019
Swain Resort	Grove	New York	1,970	1,320	650	130	35	5	120	December 10, 2019
Dry Hill Ski Area	Watertown	New York	950	650	300	37	7	3	125	December 10, 2019
Thunder Ridge Ski Area	Patterson	New York	1270	670	600	90	21	7		December 10, 2019
West Mountain	Glens Falls	New York	1,470	460	1,010	124	30	7	80	December 10, 2019
Willard Mountain	Greenwich	New York	1,415	910	505	50	16	5	80	December 10, 2019
Toggenburg Mountain Ski Center	Fabius	New York	2,000	1,300	700	85	22	5	130	December 10, 2019
Woods Valley Ski Area	Rome	New York	1,400	900	500	25	21	6	180	December 10, 2019
Brantling Ski Slopes	Sodus	New York	850	600	250	20	10	5	110	December 10, 2019
Plattekill Mountain	Roxbury	New York	3,500	2,400	1,100	110	38	4	175	December 10, 2019
Bromley Mountain Resort	Manchester	Vermont	3,284	1,950	1,334	178	47	9	168	December 10, 2019
Burke Mountain	Lyndonville	Vermont	3,267	1,210	2,011	178	50	6	217	December 10, 2019
Cochran's Ski Area	Richmond	Vermont	950	600	350	15	8	3	150	December 10, 2019
Hard'ack Recreation Area	St. Albans	Vermont			100			1		December 10, 2019
Living Memorial Park	Brattleboro	Vermont	1126	922	204	8	2	1		December 10, 2019
Lyndon Outing Club	Lyndon	Vermont	1,247	814	433	32	10	2		December 10, 2019
Mad River Glen	Waitsfield	Vermont	3,637	1,600	2,037	115	52	5	230	December 10, 2019
Jay Peak	Jay	Vermont	3,968	1,815	2,153	385	79	9	350	December 10, 2019
Magic Mountain	Londonderry	Vermont	2,850	1,350	1,500	205	51	6	150	December 10, 2019
Middlebury College Snow Bowl	Hancock	Vermont	2,720	1,720	1,000	110	17	3	250	December 10, 2019
Pico Mountain	Killington	Vermont	3,967	2,000	1,967	468	57	7	250	December 10, 2019
Saskadena Six	Pomfret	Vermont	1,200	550	650	100	23	3	110	December 10, 2019
Searchmont	Sault Ste. Marie, Ontario	Ontario	1374	759	615	100	21	4	132	February 15, 2025
Chapman Ski Hill	Durango	Colorado	7,297	6,522	775	7	1	2	71	June 21, 2020
Lee's Ski Hill	Ouray	Colorado	7,867	7,792	75	2	1	1	134	June 21, 2020
Whitewater Ski Resort	Nelson	British Columbia	6,709	4,665	2,044	1,180	46	4	472	
Kimberley Alpine Resort	Kimberley	British Columbia	6,500	4,035	2,465	1,800	80	5	150	June 21, 2023
Nakiska	Kananaskis	Alberta	7415	5003	2,412	1,021	79	6	100	
Mont Orford	Magog	Quebec	2799	856	1932	245	61	9	150	
Salmo Ski Area	Salmo	British Columbia			1,120				120	
Sasquatch Mountain	Chehalis	British Columbia			1,100	300				
Mount Washington Alpine Resort	Courtenay	British Columbia			1,663	1,700			432	
Powder King	Prince George	British Columbia	5,166	3,066	2,100	1,475	37	3	492	July 5, 2023
Manning Park	Manning Park	British Columbia			1,417	140			296	
Mount Baldy Ski Area	Oliver	British Columbia			1,293	600			256	
Harper Mountain	Kamloops	British Columbia			1,400	400			156	
Little Ski Hill	McCall	Idaho	5,600	5,195	405	50	6	1	140	February 15, 2022
Lookout Pass Ski Area	Mullan	Idaho	6,150	4,500	1,650	1,023	52	5	400	November 16, 2023
Cazenovia Ski Club	Cazenovia	New York	1,460	960	500	98	14	2		October 25, 2024
Adanac Ski Hill	Sudbury	Ontario								February 15, 2025
Alpine Ski Club	Collingwood	Ontario			760	120	37	5		May 29, 2026
Antoine Mountain	Mattawa	Ontario								February 15, 2025
Batawa Ski Hill	Batawa	Ontario								February 15, 2025
Beaver Valley Ski Club	Beaver Valley	Ontario								February 15, 2025
Boler Mountain	London	Ontario								February 15, 2025
Boogie Mountain	Espanola	Ontario								February 15, 2025
Brimacombe	Orono	Ontario								February 15, 2025
Calabogie Peaks	Calabogie	Ontario								February 15, 2025
Caledon Ski Club	Caledon	Ontario								February 15, 2025
Chicopee Ski Club	Kitchener	Ontario								February 15, 2025
Craigleith Ski Club	Collingwood	Ontario								February 15, 2025
Dagmar	Uxbridge	Ontario								February 15, 2025
Devil's Glen	Glen Huron	Ontario								February 15, 2025
Earl Bales Park	Toronto	Ontario								February 15, 2025
Georgian Peaks Club	Collingwood	Ontario								February 15, 2025
Glen Eden	Milton	Ontario								February 15, 2025
The Heights Ski Club	[[]]	Ontario								February 15, 2025
Hidden Valley Highlands	Mono	Ontario								February 15, 2025
Hockley Valley	[[]]	Ontario								February 15, 2025
Horseshoe Valley Resort	Barrie	Ontario					29	6		May 29, 2026
Kiwissa Ski Hill	Manitouwadge	Ontario								February 15, 2025
Larder Lake Ski Hill	Larder Lake	Ontario								February 15, 2025
Laurentian	North Bay	Ontario								February 15, 2025
Lively	[[]]	Ontario								February 15, 2025
Loch Lomond	[[]]	Ontario								February 15, 2025
Mansfield Ski Club	[[]]	Ontario								February 15, 2025
Mount St. Louis Moonstone	[[]]	Ontario					36	10		May 29, 2026
Mt. Baldy	[[]]	Ontario								February 15, 2025
Mt. Dufour	[[]]	Ontario								February 15, 2025
Mt. Evergreen	[[]]	Ontario								February 15, 2025
Mt. Fairweather	[[]]	Ontario								February 15, 2025
Mt. Jamieson	[[]]	Ontario								February 15, 2025
Mt. Martin	[[]]	Ontario								February 15, 2025
Mt. Pakenham	[[]]	Ontario								February 15, 2025
Osler Bluff Ski Club	[[]]	Ontario								February 15, 2025
Sir Sam’s	[[]]	Ontario								February 15, 2025
Ski Lakeridge	[[]]	Ontario								February 15, 2025
Snow Valley	[[]]	Ontario				53	20	8		May 29, 2026
Trestle Ridge	[[]]	Ontario								February 15, 2025
Tri Town	[[]]	Ontario								February 15, 2025
Uplands	[[]]	Ontario								February 15, 2025
Whirlpool Aero Car	[[]]	Ontario								February 15, 2025

== See also ==
- Comparison of California ski resorts
- Comparison of Colorado ski resorts
- Comparison of Lake Tahoe area ski resorts
- Comparison of New Mexico ski resorts
- Comparison of Southeastern United States ski resorts
- List of ski areas and resorts in the United States
