= Mankato Marathon =

Annual marathon in Mankato, Minnesota, US

- 2021 Mankato Marathon logo
- Date: Oct. 18, 2025
- Location: Mankato, Minnesota, United States
- Event type: Paved Road and Trail
- Distance: Marathon, half marathon, relay, 10k, 5k
- Primary sponsor: Mayo Clinic Health System
- Established: 2010
- Course records: Men: 2:29:26 (2017); Jacob Gallagher; Women: 2:58:18 (2013); Amy Halseth
- Website: www.mankatomarathon.com
- Participants: 5,000

The Mankato Marathon is an annual marathon race in Mankato, Minnesota, United States, that was first run in 2010. The race weekend now brings nearly 5,000 runners to the city for several races: the marathon, a marathon four-person relay, a half marathon, a 10K run, a 5K run, children's runs. The race course is certified by the USATF, making it a qualifying race for the Boston Marathon.

The race is held in mid-October, through the Minnesota River valley. Although the city is known for its steep hills, the course winds around them and features only gradual climbs and downhills as it moves through many neighborhoods, two country roads and the downtown. The marathon begins at Minnesota State University, Mankato, makes two loops through the city, and finishes on historic Front Street.

The marathon weekend is now one of the major events in southwest Minnesota.

The marathon organizers help coordinate with local non-profit organizations for fundraising leading up to and during the event. In 2019, $15,000 was raised.

Mayo Clinic Health System is the main sponsor of the race, though at its 2010 genesis, Hy-Vee sponsored the race.

The race is owned and managed by Visit Mankato (the tourism branch of Greater Mankato Growth).

In 2017 and 2018, the website Bibrave named the Mankato Half Marathon as one of the best in the United States due to the fall scenery, the supporters, and the paved trails.

Broadcast coverage of the weekend is provided by KATO-FM (93.1) and KDOG-FM (96.7).

It went virtual in 2020.

== Race weekend ==
The race weekend begins with a sports and health exposition, which is sponsored by Scheels and is held in the Myers Field House at Minnesota State University, Mankato. The day before the marathon, there are races for children and a 5K race around the MSU campus. On marathon race day, the other three races begin in the morning from the campus, near Blakeslee Stadium. The 10K starts the day, and an hour later, the marathon and half marathon take off in a combined start. Runners can also do the marathon as a four-person relay team.

Pacers are provided for both the full and half marathon.

After the races, there is a post-race party near the Mayo Clinic Health System Event Center with live music, food and drinks.

== Marathon course ==
In 2019, the course underwent a shift to more neighborhood streets and less long, straight stretches along agricultural fields.

The marathon course starts in downtown Mankato, and runs through several neighborhoods in the city, winding around quaint blocks with some cheering residents. It also takes runners on the Red Jacket Trail, around Mount Kato, near Sibley Park, along the Blue Earth River and the Minnesota River (though it is hidden by the levy walls), through the 1890s era downtown and past the Hubbard House, and down two rural roads. The finish is on Front Street, near the Mayo Clinic Health System Event Center, where several restaurants and bars are also located. The largest descent in the course is at mile 18. The course is a certified marathon distance (USATF #MN19070RR).

== Prizes ==
In 2018, the first-place winners received $250 and a trophy made of Kasota stone from the Kasota-Mankato quarries.

== History ==
The race was initially envisioned as a combination athletic and art fair event. However, city leaders felt that either event might outgrow one weekend, so the race was delegated to the regional tourism office, Visit Mankato. The office partnered with Final Events, owned by Mark Bongers. The two entities shared ownership of the race weekend. The race weekend was set later in the year to avoid competing with the seven other Minnesota marathons, and also to serve as a "last shot" for a Boston-qualifying race in the state.

The inaugural race was sponsored by Hy-Vee and the race weekend included just three races: The marathon, the half, and a 10K. The initial participation exceeded expectations: Race applications had to be turned away as 2,000 total entries (for the three races) filled early. The marathon was capped at 800 runners.

James Sorenson graduated from Gustavus Adolphus College in 2005, where he ran cross country and track, and he decided to run the inaugural race. the Gustie won the race in 2:37:04. Jen Blue, a Minnesota State Mankato coach for the track and field team, won for women in 3:06:29. It was her fourth marathon.

For the half, 1,100 runners signed up. John VanDanacker of Greenfield, Minnesota, a veteran runner and Medtronic employee who had run for University of Minnesota Duluth cross country and track in the 1980s, won. A 32-year-old Janesville, Minnesota, mother of three, Elisa Johnson, won the woman's title in 1:27:36. 350 runners took to the 10K course.

In 2011, 3,800 runners raced. And the 5K was added. The finish line shifted slightly, and Mayo Clinic became the main sponsor.

In 2014, before the race, 56-year-old North Mankato, Minnesota, resident Brian Mechler called emergency dispatchers to tell them an anonymous person planted four bombs on the marathon race route. The course was searched by local police and bomb-sniffing dogs from the Twin Cities. It was found to be safe, though more officers were added to the event security team for the marathon day. Mechler was arrested and in court, he pleaded innocent to charges of terroristic threats. Regardless, the court found him guilty. He served jail time and received mental health treatment.

In 2019 the course was rerouted to avoid the longer country roads. Instead, the weaving new path took runners through the neighborhoods. Most praised the change, but the following year, few runners would get a chance to try it again.

By the summer of 2020, Grandma's Marathon and the Twin Cities Marathon had already announced cancelations due to the COVID-19 pandemic, but it wasn't until August that the Mankato race announced it would not be run in 2020. Participants were given the opportunity to run their own course and submit their times.

== Marathon race results ==
Key: Course record

All cities in Minnesota unless indicated otherwise

	Men					Women						
Year	Place	Name	Age	Hometown	Time	Year	Place	Name	Age	Hometown	Time	
2024	1st place, gold medalist(s)	Mike Walentiny	36	Lewiston, Minnesota	2:42:56		2024	1st place, gold medalist(s)	Maddy Sweeney	25	Green Bay, Wisconsin	3:10:58
2024	2nd place, silver medalist(s)	Jeff Schulz	44	Le Sueur, Minnesota	2:59:05		2024	2nd place, silver medalist(s)	Amanda Montplaisir	24	Shakopee, Minnesota	3:13:17
2024	3rd place, bronze medalist(s)	Seth Carlmark	24	Minneapolis	3:08:50		2024	3rd place, bronze medalist(s)	Alison Zigler	24	Mankato, Minnesota	3:20:40
2023	1st place, gold medalist(s)	Jonathan Keller	29	Hugo	2:29:29		2023	1st place, gold medalist(s)	Caryn Herrick	33	St. Louis Park	2:59:33
2023	2nd place, silver medalist(s)	Max Hand	22	Saint Paul	2:40:45		2023	2nd place, silver medalist(s)	Kelli Deeg	41	Wayzata	3:14:41
2023	3rd place, bronze medalist(s)	Nicholas Rudolph	30	Waseca	2:42:12		2023	3rd place, bronze medalist(s)	Sydney Paulson	24	Minneapolis	3:15:23
2022	1st place, gold medalist(s)	Kaleb Colston	27	Bloomington	2:36:20		2022	1st place, gold medalist(s)	Steph Cloutier	31	Eleva, Wisconsin	3:08:06
2022	2nd place, silver medalist(s)	Michael Walentiny	34	Lewiston	2:39:31	2nd place, silver medalist(s)	2022	Angela Byers	42	Minneapolis	3:21:43	
2022	3rd place, bronze medalist(s)	Zach Fogarty	35	Rochester	2:55:26	3rd place, bronze medalist(s)	2022	Carissa Carroll	42	North Oaks	3:35:41	
2021	1st place, gold medalist(s)	Tristan Coughlin	38	St. Paul	2:37:34	2021	1st place, gold medalist(s)	Breana Siljander	31	Minneapolis	3:19:43	
2021	2nd place, silver medalist(s)	Michael Walentiny	33	Goodview	2:42:25	2021	2nd place, silver medalist(s)	Emily Linscheid	28	Johnston, Iowa	3:28:44	
2021	3rd place, bronze medalist(s)	Daniel Lauer-Schumacher	37	Minneapolis	2:44:13	2021	3rd place, bronze medalist(s)	Christine Skopec	32	Woodbury	3:30:50	
2020		Race canceled due to COVID-19 pandemic*				2020		Race canceled due to COVID-19 pandemic*				
2019	1st place, gold medalist(s)	Nicholas Wimmer	29	Minneapolis	2:35:28	2019	1st place, gold medalist(s)	Rebecca Mayer	38	Eden Prairie	3:01:55	
2019	2nd place, silver medalist(s)	Kyle Smith	32	Duluth	2:40:26	2019	2nd place, silver medalist(s)	Parry Larson	24	Cologne	3:23:22	
2019	3rd place, bronze medalist(s)	Ali Khalili	30	Byron	2:41:03	2019	3rd place, bronze medalist(s)	Janet Smith	38	Dundas	3:25:15	
2018	1st place, gold medalist(s)	Jacob Gallagher	23	Mankato	2:37:17	2018	1st place, gold medalist(s)	Katie Herald	30	Marshfield, Wisconsin	3:12:33	
2018	2nd place, silver medalist(s)	Jeff Lanners	35	West Saint Paul	2:41:58	2018	2nd place, silver medalist(s)	Megan Sauer	23	Lismore	3:14:31	
2018	3rd place, bronze medalist(s)	Robert Economy	54	Victoria	2:50:20	2018	3rd place, bronze medalist(s)	Anja Standly	41	Lonsdale	3:21:27	
2017	1st place, gold medalist(s)	Jacob Gallagher	22	Lisbon, North Dakota	2:29:26	2017	1st place, gold medalist(s)	Monica Dorn	38	Hendricks	3:04:40	
2017	2nd place, silver medalist(s)	Brett Rosauer	27	Iowa City, Iowa	2:30:36	2017	2nd place, silver medalist(s)	Erin Manlove	32	Minneapolis	3:07:09	
2017	3rd place, bronze medalist(s)	Daniel Bretscher	34	Northfield	2:39:34	2017	3rd place, bronze medalist(s)	Sarah Schmidt-Dannert	29	Shoreview	3:15:33	
2016	1st place, gold medalist(s)	Jeff Stuckenbroker	30	Windom	2:41:07	2016	1st place, gold medalist(s)	Lisa Tavares	37	Colfax, Wisconsin	3:06:39	
2016	2nd place, silver medalist(s)	Brock Tesdahl	24	St. Louis Park	2:42:11	2016	2nd place, silver medalist(s)	Hiedi Johnson	43	Sioux Falls, South Dakota	3:10:19	
2016	3rd place, bronze medalist(s)	Eddie Stenger	26	Woodbury	2:45:17	2016	3rd place, bronze medalist(s)	Brittney Nichole	27	Isanti	3:25:12	
2015	1st place, gold medalist(s)	Tim Hardy	40	North Mankato	2:41:16	2015	1st place, gold medalist(s)	Susie Fox	32	Chaska	3:18:58	
2015	2nd place, silver medalist(s)	Eddie Stenger	25	Lacrosse, Wisconsin	2:55:41	2015	2nd place, silver medalist(s)	Melanie Moriarty	42	North Oaks	3:22:11	
2015	3rd place, bronze medalist(s)	Luis Leonardo	35	Minnetonka	2:57:32	2015	3rd place, bronze medalist(s)	Paula Johnson	28	Andover	3:23:19	
2014	1st place, gold medalist(s)	Tim Hardy	39	North Mankato	2:33:07	2014	1st place, gold medalist(s)	Laura Edlund	28	Minnesota City	3:09:37	
2014	2nd place, silver medalist(s)	Eric Januszewski	26	Grove City	2:51:56	2014	2nd place, silver medalist(s)	Kim Scheel	38	Madison Lake	3:10:44	
2014	3rd place, bronze medalist(s)	Todd Landgraff	37	North Mankato	2:54:08	2014	3rd place, bronze medalist(s)	Paula Morozas	27	Andover	3:12:19	
2013	1st place, gold medalist(s)	Eric Thies	24	Arlington	2:34:55	2013	1st place, gold medalist(s)	Amy Halseth	43	Minneapolis	2:58:18	
2013	2nd place, silver medalist(s)	Tim Hardy	38	North Mankato	2:36:06	2013	2nd place, silver medalist(s)	Laura Gillette	28	Goshen, Indiana	3:01:32	
2013	3rd place, bronze medalist(s)	Jake Traxler	23	Le Center	2:39:35	2013	3rd place, bronze medalist(s)	Michele Asmus	33	Austin	3:07:20	
2012	1st place, gold medalist(s)	Paul Donnelly	29	Minneapolis	2:49:38	2012	1st place, gold medalist(s)	Leslie Anderson	35	Waseca	3:14:23	
2012	2nd place, silver medalist(s)	Patrick Geary	25	Sheridan, Wyoming	2:53:08	2012	2nd place, silver medalist(s)	Dawn Michaud	38	Sartell	3:21:35	
2012	3rd place, bronze medalist(s)	Joseph Paille	23	Mt. Horeb, Wisconsin	2:54:27	2012	3rd place, bronze medalist(s)	Holly Hillstrom	39	Mahtomedi	3:24:51	
2011	1st place, gold medalist(s)	Brian Sames	25	Shakopee	2:36:18	2011	1st place, gold medalist(s)	Kim Scheel	35	Mankato	3:00:47	
2011	2nd place, silver medalist(s)	Eric Thies	22	Arlington	2:44:49	2011	2nd place, silver medalist(s)	Monica Dorn	32	Hendricks	3:01:19	
2011	3rd place, bronze medalist(s)	Ronald Hoffman	34	Waconia	2:51:36	2011	3rd place, bronze medalist(s)	Leslie Anderson	34	Waseca	3:22:11	
2010	1st place, gold medalist(s)	James Sorenson	28	Minneapolis	2:37:04	2010	1st place, gold medalist(s)	Jen Blue	35	North Mankato	3:06:29	
2010	2nd place, silver medalist(s)	Tim Hardy	35	North Mankato	2:38:48	2010	2nd place, silver medalist(s)	Kim Scheel	34	Mankato	3:08:05	
2010	3rd place, bronze medalist(s)	Justin Henkel	34	Owatonna	2:44:33	2010	3rd place, bronze medalist(s)	Monica Dorn	31	Walnut Grove	3:17:09	

*A "virtual" race was scheduled.

== Half marathon race results ==
Key: Course record

All cities in Minnesota unless indicated otherwise

	Men					Women					
Year	Place	Name	Age	Hometown	Time	Year	Place	Name	Age	Hometown	Time
2022	1st place, gold medalist(s)	Mike Friedman	26	St. Paul	1:13:42	2022	1st place, gold medalist(s)	Leah Knowles	25	St. Peter	1:28:42
2022	2nd place, silver medalist(s)	Jacob Bastyr	31	Owatonna	1:16:45	2022	2nd place, silver medalist(s)	Lana Wegner	34	Wells	1:31:16
2022	3rd place, bronze medalist(s)	Josiah Swanson	30	Rochester	1:17:41	2022	3rd place, bronze medalist(s)	Lori Kelly	34	Austin	1:32:10
2021	1st place, gold medalist(s)	Mohammed Bati	22	St. Paul	1:09:32	2021	1st place, gold medalist(s)	Caryn Herrick	31	St. Louis Park	1:27:59
2021	2nd place, silver medalist(s)	Alex Wischnack	24	Kasota	1:09:38	2021	2nd place, silver medalist(s)	Brittany Opatz	35	Waconia	1:29:14
2021	3rd place, bronze medalist(s)	Kurt Keiser	48	Jordan	1:13:45	2021	3rd place, bronze medalist(s)	Michele Asmus	41	Austin	1:30:46
2020		Race canceled due to COVID-19 pandemic*				2020		Race canceled due to COVID-19 pandemic*			
2019	1st place, gold medalist(s)	Dan Greeno	31	St. Paul	1:08:02	2019	1st place, gold medalist(s)	Ashlie Greeno	27	St. Paul	1:19:19
2019	2nd place, silver medalist(s)	Alex Wischnack	22	St. Peter	1:11:32	2019	2nd place, silver medalist(s)	Mary Wirtz	32	Rochester	1:22:19
2019	3rd place, bronze medalist(s)	Jared Genteman	24	Eagan	1:11:49	2019	3rd place, bronze medalist(s)	Annie Magnusson	22	Mankato	1:25:30
2018	1st place, gold medalist(s)	Matt Longen	24	Mankato	1:12:12	2018	1st place, gold medalist(s)	Sasha Gallagher	23	Mankato	1:19:27
2018	2nd place, silver medalist(s)	Tim Hardy	43	North Mankato	1:12:16	2018	2nd place, silver medalist(s)	Janna Swenson	42	Minneapolis	1:28:02
2018	3rd place, bronze medalist(s)	Josiah Swanson	26	Rochester	1:12:34	2018	3rd place, bronze medalist(s)	Michele Asmus	38	Austin	1:29:35
2017	1st place, gold medalist(s)	Josiah Swanson	25	Rochester	1:13:11	2017	1st place, gold medalist(s)	Lena Wegner	29	Walters	1:27:10
2017	2nd place, silver medalist(s)	Bart Johnson	31	Marshall	1:14:19	2017	2nd place, silver medalist(s)	Alyssa Breu	28	St. Paul	1:32:19
2017	3rd place, bronze medalist(s)	Daniel Gerber	27	Richfield	1:14:55	2017	3rd place, bronze medalist(s)	Carmen Jaskulke	41	Granada	1:32:40
2016	1st place, gold medalist(s)	Josiah Swanson	24	Rochester	1:12:33	2016	1st place, gold medalist(s)	Cynthia Jerop	21	Lakeville	1:15:09
2016	2nd place, silver medalist(s)	Kai Sill	30	Mankato	1:17:21	2016	2nd place, silver medalist(s)	Laura Paulsen	27	Brookline, Massachusetts	1:15:59
2016	3rd place, bronze medalist(s)	Thomas Schiltz	20	Mankato	1:23:57	2016	3rd place, bronze medalist(s)	Amy Feit	36	Luverne	1:27:23
2015	1st place, gold medalist(s)	Dan Greeno	27	Richfield	1:07:46	2015	1st place, gold medalist(s)	Lindsay Henkels	35	Mankato	1:21:55
2015	2nd place, silver medalist(s)	Josiah Swanson	23	Fond Du Lac, Wisconsin	1:10:58	2015	2nd place, silver medalist(s)	Kristen Mullen	32	North Mankato	1:30:47
2015	3rd place, bronze medalist(s)	Nick Ross	26	Minneapolis	1:11:15	2015	3rd place, bronze medalist(s)	Janet Smith	34	Dundas	1:31:07
2014	1st place, gold medalist(s)	Christopher Gruenhagen	31	Brookings, South Dakota	1:11:19	2014	1st place, gold medalist(s)	Lindsay Henkels	34	Mankato	1:23:10
2014	2nd place, silver medalist(s)	Garrett Eklof	24	Madison, Wisconsin	1:12:06	2014	2nd place, silver medalist(s)	Alyssa Westrup	26	North Mankato	1:27:00
2014	3rd place, bronze medalist(s)	Eric Thies	25	Apple Valley	1:12:20	2014	3rd place, bronze medalist(s)	Greta Sieve	27	New Ulm	1:27:11
2013	1st place, gold medalist(s)	Chris Erichsen	27	Minneapolis	1:09:55	2013	1st place, gold medalist(s)	Elizabeth Yetzer	25	Lakeville	1:18:25
2013	2nd place, silver medalist(s)	Christopher Gruenhagen	30	Brookings, South Dakota	1:12:34	2013	2nd place, silver medalist(s)	Lindsay Henkels	33	Mankato	1:22:19
2013	3rd place, bronze medalist(s)	Joe Metcalf	38	Glencoe	1:13:23	2013	3rd place, bronze medalist(s)	Joyce Bourassa	46	Lakeville	1:26:37
2012	1st place, gold medalist(s)	Seth Brickley	25	Mound	1:09:15	2012	1st place, gold medalist(s)	Danielle Stack	22	Mankato	1:17:24
2012	2nd place, silver medalist(s)	Nicholas Jamnick	23	Becker	1:10:28	2012	2nd place, silver medalist(s)	Lindsay Henkels	32	Mankato	1:19:33
2012	3rd place, bronze medalist(s)	Christopher Gruenhagen	29	Brookings, South Dakota	1:11:01	2012	3rd place, bronze medalist(s)	Andrea Rediger	23	Plymouth	1:20:35
2011	1st place, gold medalist(s)	Peter Gilman	36	Rochester	1:09:52	2011	1st place, gold medalist(s)	Greta Sieve	24	New Ulm	1:20:18
2011	2nd place, silver medalist(s)	Jeff Stuckenbaker	25	Windom	1:10:28	2011	2nd place, silver medalist(s)	McKenzie Holt	15	St. Cloud	1:21:58
2011	3rd place, bronze medalist(s)	Nick Ross	23	Hastings	1:10:31	2011	3rd place, bronze medalist(s)	Lindsay Henkels	31	Mankato	1:23:10
2010	1st place, gold medalist(s)	John VanDanacker	48	Greenfield	1:15:36	2010	1st place, gold medalist(s)	Elisa Johnson	32	Janesville	1:27:36
2010	2nd place, silver medalist(s)	John Hage	28	Sioux Falls, South Dakota	1:22:10	2010	2nd place, silver medalist(s)	Keri Brown	33	Garfield	1:30:15
2010	3rd place, bronze medalist(s)	Jacob Kocak	25	River Falls, Wisconsin	1:22:31	2010	3rd place, bronze medalist(s)	Ashley Hertling	26	New Ulm	1:32:21

*A "virtual" race was scheduled.
