= Mansfield Ski Club =

Ski resort in Ontario, Canada

- Location within Southern Ontario
- Location: Mulmur, Ontario
- Mountain: Niagara Escarpment
- Nearest city: Barrie, Ontario, Canada
- Coordinates: 44.19752°N 80.05378°W
- Status: Active
- Vertical: 130 m (430 ft)
- Trails: 18
- Lift system: 6 chairlifts
- Website: www.mansfieldskiclub.com

Mansfield Ski Club is a private club located in Mulmur, Ontario, Canada, about 100 kilometres northwest of Toronto.

It features 18 groomed runs serviced by 6 lifts. The club offers "Snow School" instructors as well as competitive race programs coaching. The club also includes four food and beverage stations, an onsite daycare, a fully equipped rental shop offering tuning/repair services, yoga classes, snowshoe trails, and reciprocal access to over 13 private clubs located across the Greater Toronto Area.

== Runs ==
- Easy Does It (green)
- Awesome (green)
- Chalet Run (green)
- Hemlock (green)
- Shortcut (blue)
- Gilly's (blue)
- Hector's Hill (blue)
- Javelin (blue)
- Boomerang (blue)
- Glades (black)
- Low's Run (blue)
- Big Tree (black)
- Devil's Staircase (black)
- Breenger (black)
- Mouse Trap (black)
- Sully's Dream (black)
- Auction (black)
- Outer Limits (black)

== Fees ==
In 2021, the CBC News reported that membership in the Mansfield Ski Club costs $15,000 per family to start, with annual dues ranging between $8,000 to $10,000 per year for a family of four thereafter.
