= Showdown Ski Area =

Ski area in Montana, United States

- Location in Montana Showdown Ski Area (the United States)
- Location: Meagher County, Montana, near Neihart, Montana
- Nearest city: Neihart, Montana
- Coordinates: 46°50′19″N 110°42′32″W
- Vertical: 1,400 ft (430 m)
- Top elevation: 8,200 ft (2,500 m)
- Base elevation: 6,800 ft (2,100 m)
- Skiable area: 640 acres (2.6 km^{2})
- Trails: 39
- Lift system: 4 total: One Triple, Two Double, One Conveyer
- Snowfall: 20 feet (6.1 m)
- Website: Showdown official website

Showdown is an alpine ski area located in the Little Belt Mountains in Central Montana, United States. Created in 1936 and originally called King's Hill Ski Area, Showdown is a small-scale ski area that is often closed on Mondays and Tuesdays, receiving most patrons on the weekends during the season. An office in Great Falls, Montana has also been known to be available for ticket sales

== History ==
Early Years (1936–1973)

Originally created in 1936, Showdown is Montana's oldest operating ski area, as well as one of the oldest in the United States. It was originally called King's Hill Ski Area, and was operated by the Great Falls Ski Club. In 1940, the ski area opened its first Rope Tow, donated by Great Falls businessman Charlie Bovey. In 1957, the ski club along with members from the Great Falls Ski Patrol formed Ski Lift Inc. to manage the operations of the area. The company sold stock, and purchased a Poma lift that traveled up The Hall-o, and ended at the top of the mountain. The company also began adding additions to the lodge, with the last addition to the main lodge completed in 1968. In 1964, the Poma was replaced with a T-bar. The Poma was relocated to the far Northside of the mountain as a learning area lift. In 1970, Ski Lift Inc. purchased the Prospector Chairlift from WSO Stadeli. At the time, it was the longest chairlift ride in the world. Prior to the installation of the chairlift, runs off of the ridge had no exit point except for a rope tow that took skiers from the bottom of Second Thought, up Dicks Ditch, ending at Arkansas Traveler.

Willet Ownership (1973–2020)

In 1973, George Willet and Ted Cogswell purchased the ski area from Ski Lift Inc. The two partners met in a bar, and soon after came up with a proposal to purchase the ski area. In 1973 the Ski Area changed its name from King's Hill Ski Area to Showdown Ski Area. The name was changed to Showdown, due to the fact that every time you ski, its a Showdown with gravity! In 1974, the basement of the lodge was excavated, completing the final additions to the main lodge. In 1978, the T-bar was removed, and replaced with the WSO Stadeli Payload triple chair. The chair ran up a new alignment that better served the mountain. In 1986, a new maintenance shop was built. In 1997, a new addition was built onto the lodge, which added a bar, administrative offices, more seating, and gave dedicated space to ski school and ski patrol. In 2006, Showdown purchased the old Collins Lift from Alta, was renamed The Sluice Goose Caboose, and installed it as a beginner chairlift, mainly serving green and blue runs. The Poma that was previously used to access this terrain was removed in the process. In 2020, George sold the business to his daughter Katie Boedecker.

Boedecker Ownership (2020–Present)

In 2020, Katie Boedecker assumed ownership of the ski area from her father George. In 2020, the area began an aggressive inbounds logging project to begin to open up the interior of the resort to gladed skiing. This project is expected to last a number of years. In the winter season of 2020-21, Showdown began seeing skiers come from other resorts in the state who restricted access due to the Covid-19 pandemic. This has continued since due to the areas consistent snow, and family atmosphere. In 2022, Showdown celebrated its 85th anniversary, making it the oldest ski area in Montana, and one of the oldest in the country. In honor of the 85th anniversary, some runs at Showdown were renamed in honor of the original backers of the resort, as well as other important figures in the history of the resort. In the summer of 2022, the resort purchased the former All Seasons Inn and Suites, and renovated it into the Edith Hotel. Future plans for the area include on mountain accommodations, new guest services buildings, new lifts, and summer activities.

== Services ==
The ski area has a base day lodge, which contains food services, ski shop, coffee shop, ticket sales, and a bar. Also located at the base is the rental shop, ski patrol, and ski school. Showdown also provides a warming hut at the top of the mountain known as the Top Rock. It has been known to serve food on busy weekends.

== Lifts ==
Showdown has three aerial lifts and one surface lift:

- Prospector Double Chair, Installed 1970, Ride time 12.5 min
- Payload Triple Chair, Installed 1978, Ride time 9 min
- Sluice Goose Caboose, Installed 2005, Ride time 6 min
- Little Belt Conveyor, Installed 2014

== Geography ==
The Ski Area is near Kings Hill Pass in a high elevation area of the Little Belt Mountains. The ski area sits on Porphyry Peak (elevation 8,200 feet or 2,500 meters), one of the tallest mountains in the range. One of the most difficult runs is Glory Hole and one of the easiest runs is Teds Tumble.

=== Climate ===
Porphyry is a Remote Automated Weather Station located near the summit of Porphyry Peak within the Showdown Ski Area. Porphyry Peak has a subalpine climate (Köppen Dfc), bordering on an alpine climate (Köppen ETH).

Climate data for Porphyry (RAWS), Montana, 2002–2020 normals; elevation 8,232 feet or 2,509 meters
Month	Jan	Feb	Mar	Apr	May	Jun	Jul	Aug	Sep	Oct	Nov	Dec	Year
Mean daily maximum °F (°C)	22.7 (−5.2)	22.7 (−5.2)	31.0 (−0.6)	37.8 (3.2)	46.0 (7.8)	54.8 (12.7)	67.0 (19.4)	64.8 (18.2)	55.2 (12.9)	39.7 (4.3)	28.5 (−1.9)	20.6 (−6.3)	40.9 (4.9)
Daily mean °F (°C)	16.8 (−8.4)	15.8 (−9.0)	23.0 (−5.0)	28.9 (−1.7)	37.7 (3.2)	46.1 (7.8)	57.1 (13.9)	55.2 (12.9)	46.7 (8.2)	32.8 (0.4)	22.5 (−5.3)	15.1 (−9.4)	33.1 (0.6)
Mean daily minimum °F (°C)	10.7 (−11.8)	8.7 (−12.9)	14.9 (−9.5)	20.0 (−6.7)	29.4 (−1.4)	37.5 (3.1)	47.3 (8.5)	45.4 (7.4)	37.8 (3.2)	25.9 (−3.4)	16.1 (−8.8)	9.8 (−12.3)	25.3 (−3.7)
Source: XMACIS2
