= Christie Mountain (ski area) =

Ski and snowboard area in Bruce, Wisconsin

Coordinates: 45°30′33.0″N 91°22′50.7″W

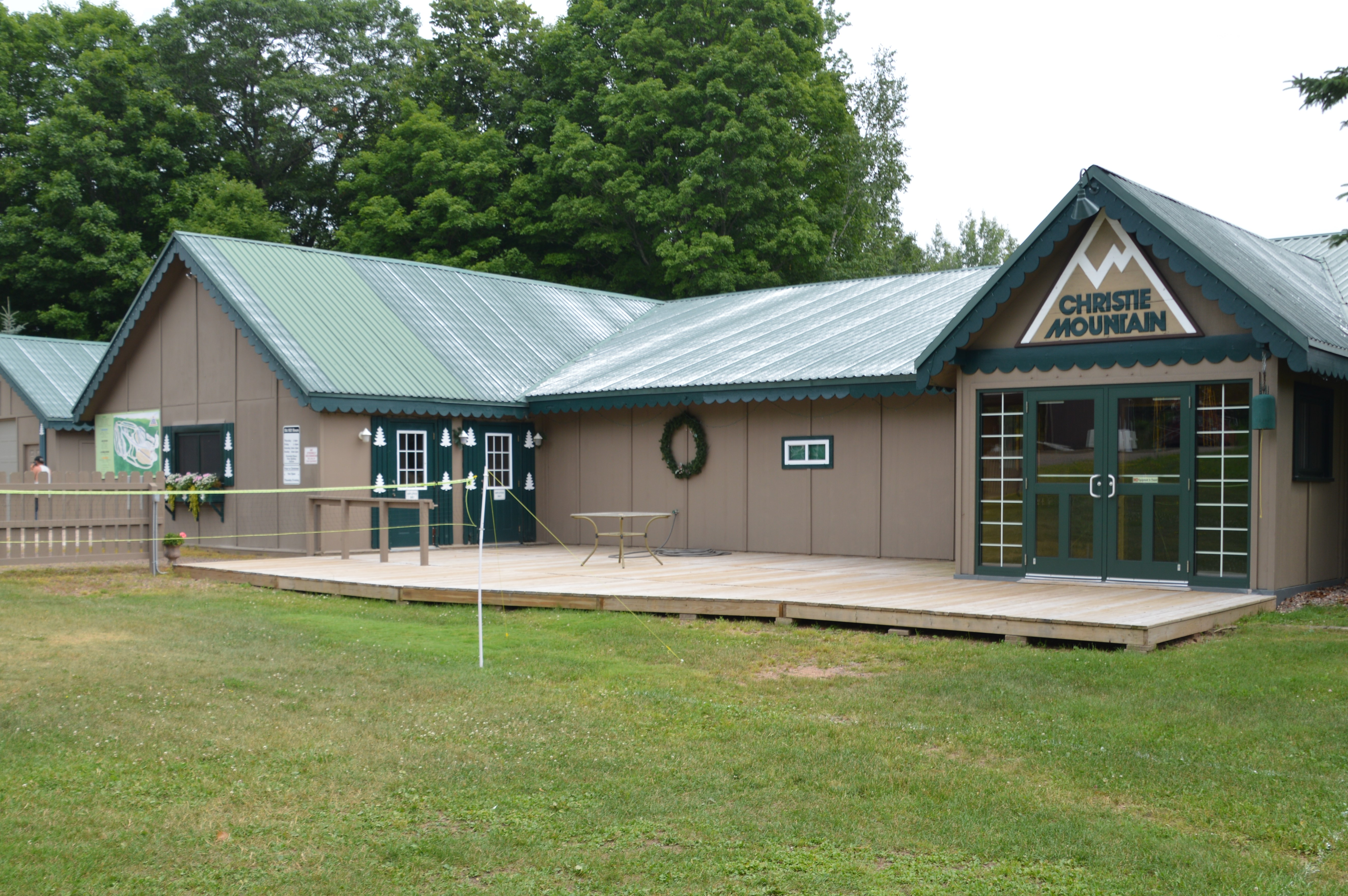
The Chalet at Christie Mountain in Bruce, WI. The Chalet has a snack bar and fireplace for skiers in the winter.w:Christie Mountain (ski area)

Christie Mountain is a ski and snowboard area in Bruce, Wisconsin, that opened in 1977. It is in the Blue Hills area of Northern Wisconsin between Rice Lake and Ladysmith.

== History ==
Christie Mountain ski area was designed and built by George and Pat Sorenson in the 1970s. The Sorensons named the ski area after the Stem christie—the name of a turn used in alpine skiing—and opened it for business in 1976. They designed a series of trails, installed two chairlifts, drilled a well, created a holding pond for snow-making water, and built a chalet.

After operating the business for eight years, the Sorensons sold the operation to Jim and Laura Landreth in 1985. They added a living quarters to the chalet, added new ski runs, and started the legend of the Blue Hills Beast.

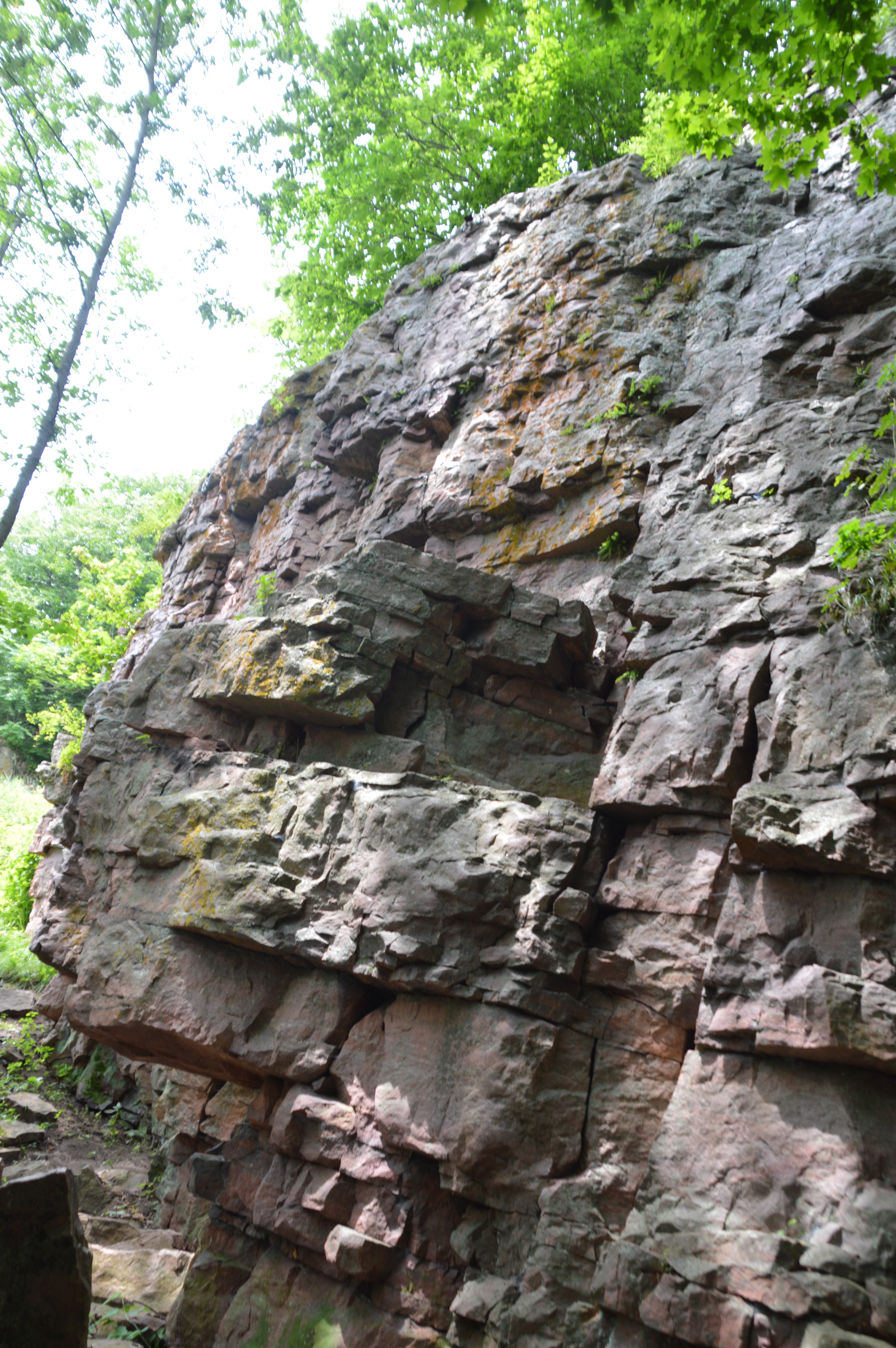
Natural rock climbing wall at Christie Mountain.

David and Sue Vohs purchased Christie Mountain from the Landreths in 1998 and, along with their daughter. The Vohs have added ski, snowboarding, and snow tubing trails (a total of thirty trails). They have also added a natural rock wall climbing area with four 30 foot routes.

== Stats and Amenities ==
Vertical Rise: 350 ft Longest run: 4,000 ft Trails and slopes: 30 (11 easy, 6 medium, 7 difficult, 6 extremely difficult)

1 double chairlift, 1 t-bar, 3 rope tows.

Ski rentals: skis, snowboards, snowblades, tubes, and snowshoes.

Snack bars, vending machines, and bar.
