= Ski Snowstar =

Ski area in Illinois, United States

Coordinates: 41.4250°N 90.7438°W

Snowstar Winter Sports Park, also known as Snowstar, located in Andalusia Township, Rock Island County, near Andalusia, Illinois, 10 minutes from the Quad Cities. Snowstar has 28 acres of ridable terrain.

== History ==
In 1979, about 70 acres of land was purchased to build Ski Snowstar. When the park opened in the winter of 1981-82, it had 6 acres of ridable land, a four-person chairlift and a cable tow. They also had 3 snow machines that covered all the hills. The ski lodge offered a cafeteria, lounge, ticket office, ski school, ski patrol, rental office, and a gift shop. The following summer, they almost doubled ridable acres with the addition of an intermediate hill and another quad chairlift. The park was purchased in 2021 by a couple from Illinois City.

== Facilities ==
Buildings on the property include a 6,000 square foot lodge with multiple dining options, a welcome center and a ski patrol. There are 32 snow guns that cover the entire resort and can produce enough snow for a season to last 75 days. The park experiences a natural annual snowfall of 38-40 inches. Of the 14 trails, half are for intermediate level skiers, while the remaining trails are divided between beginner and advanced(25% each). It has six ski lifts of different varieties. Two are tow ropes. Features include quarter pipe, hip jumps, spines, and more. Snowstar also has a tubing hill. Opening in February 2019, Snowstar also offers year round zip-line tours. It features four lines, with the longest line spanning 1,300 feet.
