= Salmo Ski Area =

Ski area in British Columbia, Canada

Coordinates: 49.1815°N 117.3015°W

Salmo Ski Area is a small ski area located in the West Kootenay region of southeastern British Columbia, Canada, 0.5km south of the village of Salmo, 28 miles (45 km) southeast of the city of Castlegar, and 31 miles (50 km) south of the city of Nelson.

Annual snowfall averages 300 cm (10 ft) with a vertical drop of 305 m (1,001 ft) from a summit elevation of 945 m (3,100 ft) to a base elevation of 640m (2,100 ft). There are four trails served by a T-Bar and a handle tow. The area features night-skiing, cross-country trails, and a halfpipe for snowboarding.
