= Turner Mountain Ski Resort =

Ski resort in Libby, Montana

- Location in the United States Location in Montana
- Location: Lincoln County, Montana, U.S.
- Nearest city: Libby – 22 miles (35 km); Kalispell
- Coordinates: 48.605°N 115.63°W
- Vertical: 2,110 ft (643 m)
- Top elevation: 5,952 ft (1,814 m)
- Base elevation: 3,842 ft (1,171 m)
- Trails: 20
- Lift system: 1 double chairlift
- Snowfall: 250 inches (640 cm)
- Website: skiturner.com

Turner Mountain Ski Resort is an alpine ski area in the western United States, located in northwest Montana, 22 miles (35 km) north of Libby. The mountain is known for its fall-line powder skiing. Libby is located along the western portion of U.S. Route 2 in the Kootenai Valley between the Cabinet Mountains to the south and the Purcell Mountains to the north.

In the late 1930s, an enthusiastic group of Libby skiers formed Kootenai Ski Club (later Libby Ski Club) in order to develop a ski area. In the 1950s, they started a plan to develop Turner Mountain into a ski area, and it was opened on New Year's weekend of 1961. The summer after the first season, a T-bar was added.

Turner Mountain Ski Area is volunteer-run and managed by a nonprofit organization called Kootenai Winter Sports Ski Education Foundation, Inc. The resort received funding from the City of Libby Economic Development Fund to develop a new lodge facility. It was completed in February 2006.

The T-bar to the summit, over a mile (1.6 km) in length, debuted in 1961. It was succeeded by a double chairlift in the fall of 2001.
