= Goodview, Minnesota =

City in Minnesota, United States

Goodview
- City
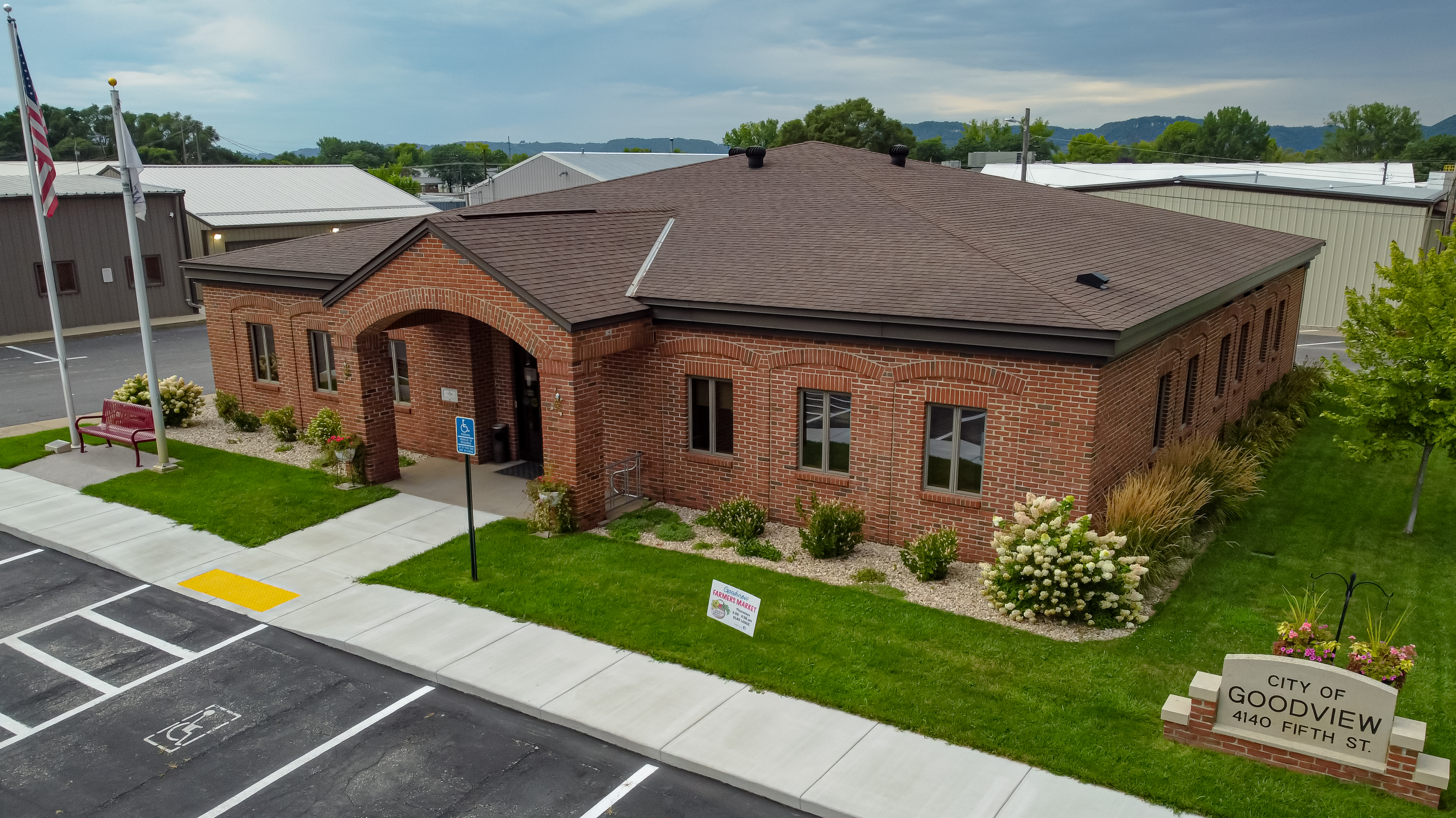
- City hall
- Motto: "A Great Place To Live"
- Location of Goodview, Minnesota
- Coordinates: 44°04′15″N 91°43′21″W
- Country: United States
- State: Minnesota
- County: Winona
- Established: 1946 (Village); January 1, 1974 (City)

Government
  - Type: Mayor - Council
  - Mayor: Ben Klinger

Area
  - Total: 2.47 sq mi (6.41 km^{2})
  - Land: 2.22 sq mi (5.75 km^{2})
  - Water: 0.26 sq mi (0.67 km^{2})
- Elevation: 646 ft (197 m)

Population (2020)
  - Total: 4,158
  - Estimate (2021): 4,138
  - Density: 1,874.2/sq mi (723.65/km^{2})
- Time zone: UTC-6 (CST)
  - Summer (DST): UTC-5 (CDT)
- ZIP code: 55987
- Area code: 507
- FIPS code: 27-24524
- GNIS feature ID: 2394931
- Website: goodview.govoffice.com

Goodview is a city in Winona County, Minnesota, United States. The population was 4,158 at the 2020 census.

== History ==
The area was first inhabited by the Dakota. When neighboring Winona was founded in 1851, Chief Wabasha III used the area that is now Goodview as a camping site near the settlers. Following the Dakota's expulsion, the land became home to watermelon farms. Much of the land was bought by Clarence F. Witt, who in the 1940s began suburban development, then calling it the 'Goodview Subdivision'. The referendum was successful. Goodview's decision to incorporate was so that it could manage its own snow removal, as the township government had only one snowplow. The township board, nor the Winona city council, had any interest in that lack of snow removal service that the subdivision received. The mayor of Winona remarked “We’ll just let spring take care of your problem,” which caused outrage among Goodview residents. It is not known whether the comment was made seriously or as a joke. In August 1946, a referendum was held to separate from Winona Township and incorporate as the Village of Goodview. Over 90% of residents voted in favor of seceding and incorporating.

Goodview was initially dependent on Winona State University for education. When a 1966 law was passed that made Goodview part of the Winona School District, the residents of Goodview were strongly against the change as heavy taxes to fund the construction of a high school in Winona were levied. In 1969, the village held a referendum to establish its own school district, which passed with 98% of the vote. The high voter turnout against Winona was seen by residents as "getting even" for being ignored prior to incorporation. Goodview became a city on January 1, 1974. The city grew, annexing more land in 2000, 2003, and 2008.

== Geography ==
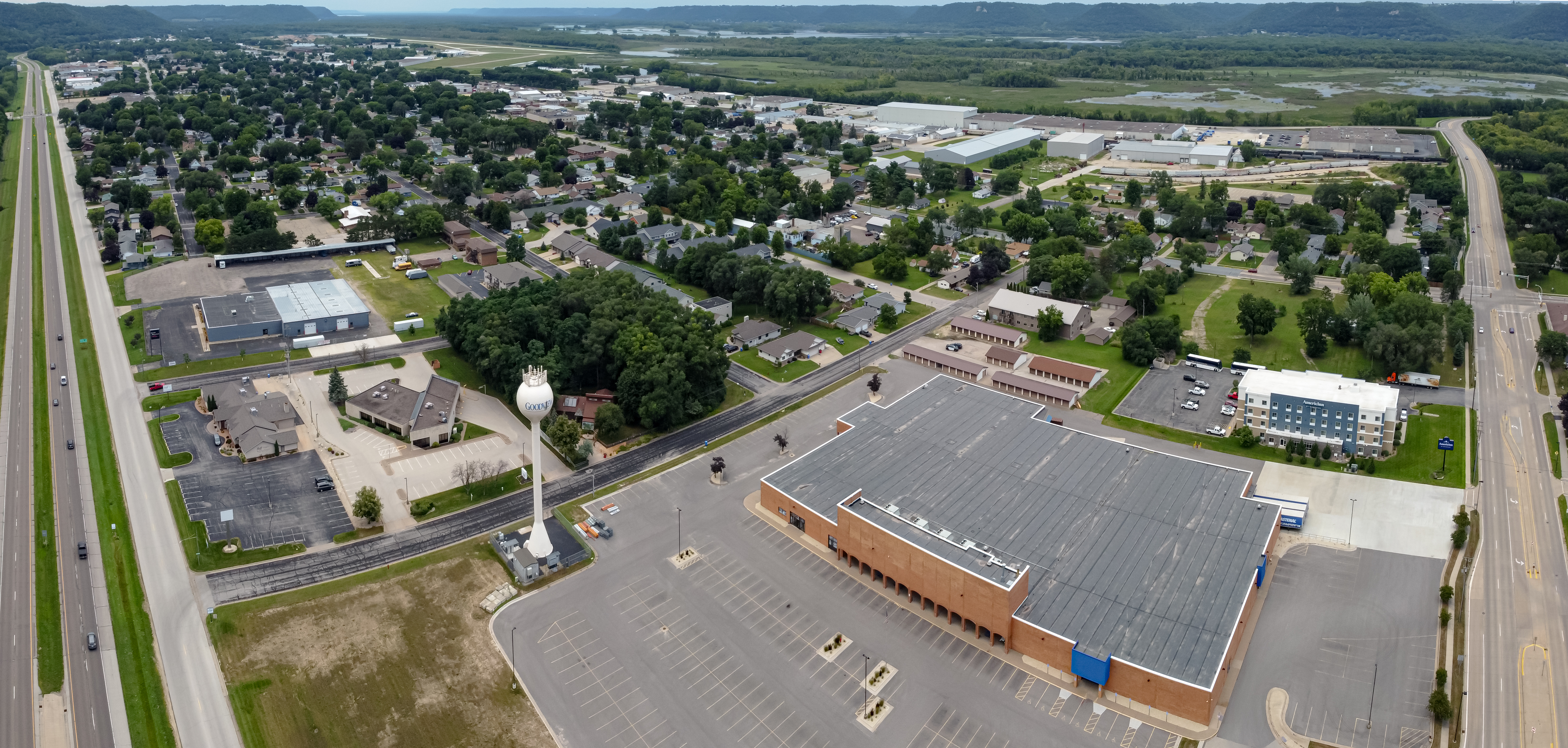

According to the United States Census Bureau, the city has a total area of 2.49 square miles (6.45 km^{2}); 2.25 square miles (5.83 km^{2}) is land and 0.24 square miles (0.62 km^{2}) is water.

== Demographics ==
Historical population
Census	Pop.	Note	%±
1950	777		—
1960	1,348		73.5%
1970	1,829		35.7%
1980	2,567		40.3%
1990	2,878		12.1%
2000	3,373		17.2%
2010	4,036		19.7%
2020	4,158		3.0%
2021 (est.)	4,138		−0.5%
U.S. Decennial Census; 2020 Census

=== 2020 census ===
As of the 2020 census, Goodview had a population of 4,158. The median age was 41.4 years. 20.2% of residents were under the age of 18 and 19.4% of residents were 65 years of age or older. For every 100 females there were 102.8 males, and for every 100 females age 18 and over there were 99.3 males age 18 and over.

99.7% of residents lived in urban areas, while 0.3% lived in rural areas.

There were 1,830 households in Goodview, of which 24.3% had children under the age of 18 living in them. Of all households, 47.3% were married-couple households, 18.7% were households with a male householder and no spouse or partner present, and 24.8% were households with a female householder and no spouse or partner present. About 30.2% of all households were made up of individuals and 11.2% had someone living alone who was 65 years of age or older.

There were 1,969 housing units, of which 7.1% were vacant. The homeowner vacancy rate was 1.3% and the rental vacancy rate was 6.6%.

Racial composition as of the 2020 census
Race	Number	Percent
White	3,655	87.9%
Black or African American	70	1.7%
American Indian and Alaska Native	11	0.3%
Asian	120	2.9%
Native Hawaiian and Other Pacific Islander	0	0.0%
Some other race	81	1.9%
Two or more races	221	5.3%
Hispanic or Latino (of any race)	156	3.8%

=== 2010 census ===
As of the census of 2010, there were 4,036 people, 1,660 households, and 1,127 families living in the city. The population density was 1,793.8 inhabitants per square mile (692.6/km^{2}). There were 1,750 housing units at an average density of 777.8 per square mile (300.3/km^{2}). The racial makeup of the city was 96.0% White, 0.8% African American, 0.2% Native American, 1.8% Asian, 0.5% from other races, and 0.7% from two or more races. Hispanic or Latino of any race were 2.1% of the population.

There were 1,660 households, of which 30.2% had children under the age of 18 living with them, 52.0% were married couples living together, 11.9% had a female householder with no husband present, 4.0% had a male householder with no wife present, and 32.1% were non-families. 23.9% of all households were made up of individuals, and 6.8% had someone living alone who was 65 years of age or older. The average household size was 2.41 and the average family size was 2.85.

The median age in the city was 38.7 years. 22.4% of residents were under the age of 18; 9.6% were between the ages of 18 and 24; 26.5% were from 25 to 44; 28% were from 45 to 64; and 13.7% were 65 years of age or older. The gender makeup of the city was 49.4% male and 50.6% female.

=== 2000 census ===
As of the census of 2000, there were 3,373 people, 1,375 households, and 966 families living in the city. The population density was 1,947.2 inhabitants per square mile (751.8/km^{2}). There were 1,419 housing units at an average density of 819.2 per square mile (316.3/km^{2}). The racial makeup of the city was 97.45% White, 0.39% African American, 0.15% Native American, 1.16% Asian, 0.27% from other races, and 0.59% from two or more races. Hispanic or Latino of any race were 0.95% of the population.

There were 1,375 households, out of which 34.3% had children under the age of 18 living with them, 57.7% were married couples living together, 9.9% had a female householder with no husband present, and 29.7% were non-families. 24.2% of all households were made up of individuals, and 7.6% had someone living alone who was 65 years of age or older. The average household size was 2.45 and the average family size was 2.92.

In the city, the population was spread out, with 25.7% under the age of 18, 8.7% from 18 to 24, 30.1% from 25 to 44, 24.5% from 45 to 64, and 11.0% who were 65 years of age or older. The median age was 36 years. For every 100 females, there were 94.3 males. For every 100 females age 18 and over, there were 92.5 males.

The median income for a household in the city was $43,654, and the median income for a family was $52,837. Males had a median income of $36,788 versus $23,554 for females. The per capita income for the city was $22,488. About 3.8% of families and 6.2% of the population were below the poverty line, including 7.7% of those under age 18 and 6.7% of those age 65 or over.

== Transportation ==
Two Amtrak passenger train services run through Goodview on CPKC tracks, but do not stop. The nearest station is 3 miles (4.8 km) to the east in neighboring Winona, where the long-distance Empire Builder operates between Seattle/Portland and Chicago, and the shorter-distance Borealis operates between Saint Paul and Chicago.
