= Ski Brule =

Ski area in Michigan, United States

Coordinates: 46.028°N 88.701°W

Ski Brule is a ski area located in Stambaugh Township, Iron County, near Iron River, Michigan.

Ski Brule has seventeen ski runs and seven ski lifts. The trails include one double black diamond, three black diamonds, six blue squares, five green circles, and a 30-acre terrain park consisting of two trails.
