= Moose Mountain (Alaska) =

Ski area in Alaska, United States

- Location within Alaska

Highest point
- Elevation: 1,985 ft (605 m)
- Coordinates: 64°56′26″N 147°59′26″W

Geography
- Location: Goldstream, near Fairbanks, Alaska, US

Moose Mountain (elev. 1987 ft.) is the largest ski area in interior Alaska, with 750 acres, 40 runs of intermediate and advanced terrain and 1300 vertical feet. It is 10 mi (16 km) west of Fairbanks, Alaska. Heated busses transport skiers up the 3 mile road to the summit in 8–9 minutes. A short rope tow at the base lodge serves beginners and children learning the sport. The ski area is open Friday-Sunday plus holidays from mid November to late March.

Moose Mountain began as a master's project at the University of Alaska in 1989. After negotiating an option on the property, it was purchased and the ski area opened in spring of 1993. It has operated successfully with the same ownership ever since. The bus system has proven very popular, especially in the cold winter months, allowing skiers to get back on the bus to warm up instead of needing to go in the base lodge as often.

Interior Alaska has a moderate snowfall of 60-100 inches annually. To prepare for the moderate snowpack, the runs are mowed annually, leaving a smooth organic surface so that skiing may begin with minimal packed depth. The snow is cold and dry and stays throughout the winter, making for good skiing and snowboarding throughout.
