= Snowhaven =

Ski area in Idaho, United States

- Location in Idaho Snowhaven (the United States)
- Location: Idaho County, Idaho, U.S.
- Nearest city: Grangeville: 7 miles (11 km)
- Coordinates: 45°52′8.4″N 116°5′24″W
- Vertical: 400 ft (122 m)
- Top elevation: 5,600 ft (1,707 m)
- Base elevation: 5,200 ft (1,585 m)
- Skiable area: 40 acres (16 ha)
- Trails: 9: 75% beginner; 25% intermediate
- Longest run: 5,600 feet (1,710 m)
- Lift system: 1 T-bar; 1 rope tow
- Snowfall: 60 in (150 cm)
- Snowmaking: no
- Night skiing: no
- Website: Snowhaven

Snowhaven is a modest ski area in the western United States, located in north central Idaho, seven miles (11 km) southeast of Grangeville in Idaho County. The elevation of its summit is 5,600 feet (1,707 m) above sea level, with a vertical drop of 400 feet (122 m) on east-facing slopes.

There are two surface lifts, a T-bar and a rope tow, serving 9 trails. The average annual snowfall is 60 inches (150 cm) and the terrain is rated 75% beginner and 25% intermediate. The 2,600-foot (790 m) T-bar was installed 54 years ago in the fall of 1972, which accompanied the addition of new runs, and was financed with a federal grant through the Bureau of Outdoor Recreation.

The facility is operated by the City of Grangeville and is open on weekends. Ski operations began around 1940, but it saw little use until after World War II. A new access road was constructed in 1957.
