= Echo Valley Ski Area =

Ski area in Washington, United States

- Location in Washington Echo Valley Ski Area (the United States)
- Location: Chelan County, Washington, USA
- Nearest city: Chelan, 10 miles south
- Coordinates: 47°56′09″N 120°03′22″W
- Top elevation: 3,900 ft (1,200 m)
- Base elevation: 3,000 ft (910 m)
- Skiable area: 70 acres (280,000 m^{2})
- Lift system: 4 surface lifts
- Website: Echo Valley Ski Area

Echo Valley Ski Area is a small ski area located near Chelan, Washington, United States. The base elevation is at 3,000 feet (910 m) with the peak at 3,900 feet (1,200 m).
