= Devil's Head Resort =

Golf and ski resort in Wisconsin, United States

Coordinates: 43°25′23″N 89°37′37″W

- Interactive map of Devil's Head Resort
- Location: Town of Merrimac, Wisconsin
- Nearest city: Baraboo, Wisconsin
- Vertical: 500 ft (150 m)
- Top elevation: 1,490 ft
- Base elevation: 990 ft (300 m)
- Skiable area: 268 acres (1.08 km^{2})
- Trails: 30
- Longest run: 0.663 miles (1.067 km)
- Lift system: 9: Seven chairlifts (4 quad, 1 triple, 1 double); 2 wonder carpet
- Terrain parks: 3
- Snowfall: 55 in
- Website: https://www.devilsheadresort.com/ski-resort-mountain-sauk-merrimac-wi-wisconsin/

Devil's Head Resort is a golf, meeting/convention, and ski resort located in the Town of Merrimac in Sauk County, Wisconsin, near Devil's Lake State Park.

== Description ==
Its runs face mostly south, overlooking the Wisconsin River. They range from very gentle to fairly challenging. There is also a range of terrain park difficulty; one moderately sloped area has low rails and boxes, another has higher jumps, rails, and boxes on a steeper slope, and a third has large jumps. There is no glade skiing or backcountry skiing.

Two 18-hole golf courses operate during the summer and there are mountain biking trails.

Two hotel facilities are operated by the resort, one in the central lodge complex and one 6-story high-rise near the east side of the ski runs.
