= Eaton Mountain =

Ski area in Skowhegan, Maine

Eaton Mountain Ski Area & Snowtubing Park
- Interactive map of Eaton Mountain Ski Area & Snowtubing Park
- Location: Skowhegan, Maine, United States
- Nearest city: Waterville, Maine
- Coordinates: 44°46′5″N 69°37′10″W
- Top elevation: 840 feet (260 m)
- Base elevation: 220 feet (67 m)
- Trails: 18
- Longest run: Fawn (0.67 mi or 1.08 km)
- Lift system: 2

Eaton Mountain is a small family-oriented ski area located in Skowhegan, Maine. It consist of 5 Beginner trails (28%), 7 intermediate trails (39%) and 6 expert trails (33%). Along with a double chairlift and a rope tow. It also has over 50% snowmaking and over 50% night skiing. It also has a terrain park, a tubing hill, and over 622 feet (190 m) of vertical drop.

During November 2008, Eaton Mountain was purchased by the Beers family. With little time to make needed improvements, the decision was made to close Eaton Mountain for the 2008–09 winter ski season. The ski area was set to re-open in fall of 2009. As of 2019, the ski area had reopened. As of January 2020 the ski area re-closed.

== Terrain ==
Eaton has variety of terrain from gentle rolling trails like the Fawn and Badger to expert runs like the Fisher and Fox, which includes steeps, ledges, and glades.

== History ==
The first lift, a rope tow, opened in the winter of 1961–62. Today, there is a double chair and a handle tow for snow tubing. In 2008, Eaton Mountain was purchased by the Beers family.
