= Wild Mountain =

Ski area in Minnesota, United States

Coordinates: 45°29′20″N 92°42′20″W

- Interactive map of Wild Mountain
- Location: Amador Township, Chisago County, Minnesota
- Nearest city: Taylors Falls, Minnesota
- Opened: December 1960
- Trails: 26
- Longest run: 5,000 ft (1,500 m)
- Lift system: 4 chairlifts, 4 rope tows, 1 surface lift
- Terrain parks: 4
- Snowfall: 40 inches
- Snowmaking: Yes, 100% coverage
- Night skiing: Yes
- Website: http://www.wildmountain.com/

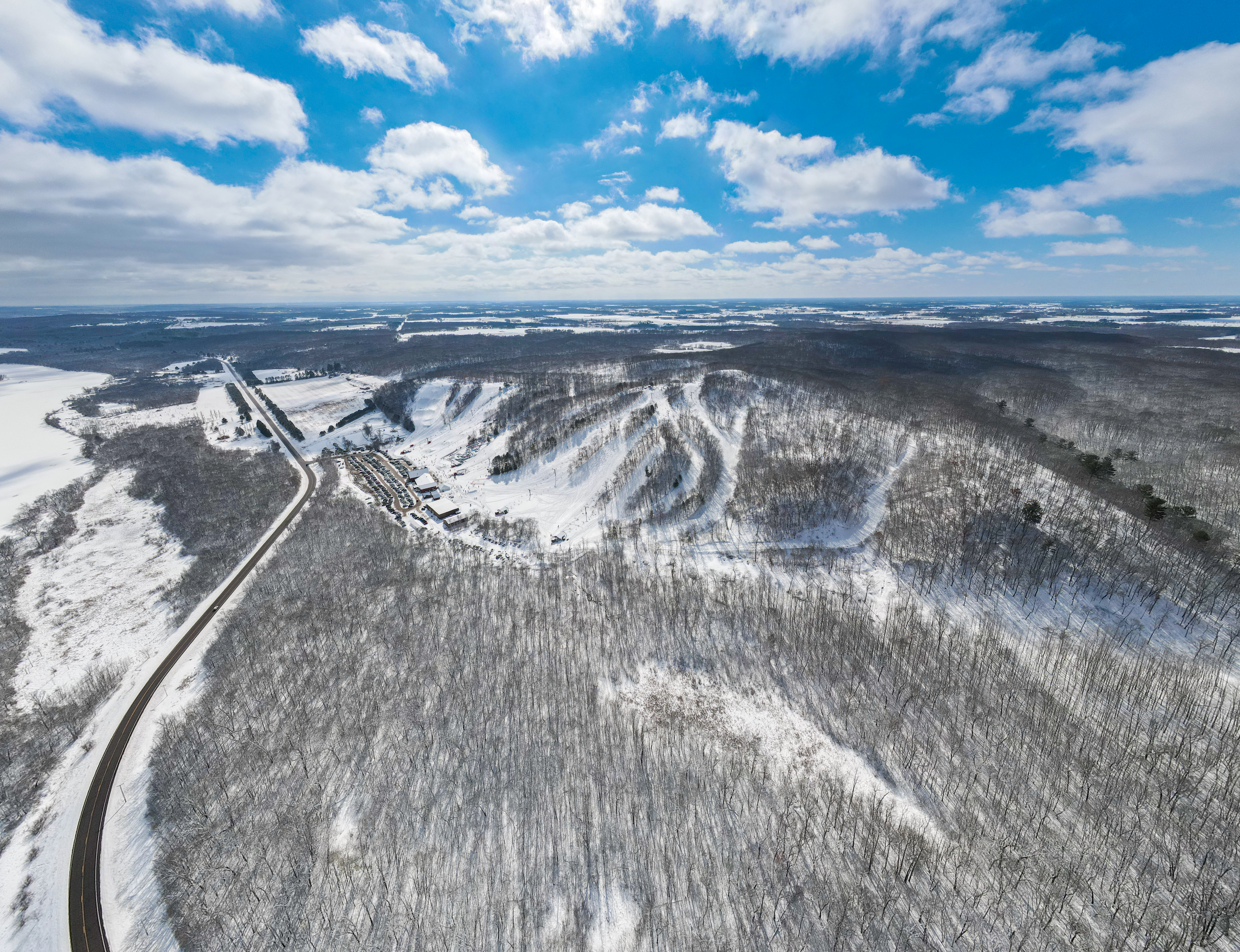
Wild Mountain From Above

Wild Mountain is a ski area and snow tubing park in the winter and a waterpark during the summer. It is located in Amador Township, Chisago County, near Taylors Falls, Minnesota.

== Overview ==
During the winter months, Wild Mountain delivers 26 runs and 4 terrain parks across 100 acres of terrain. The ski area has 4 chairlifts, 4 rope tows and one conveyor. Wild Mountain enjoys a vintage base lodge which was originally constructed in 1960 and has had numerous additions. The base lodge was upgraded between 2021 and 2023 including a new bar, new flooring, updated bathrooms, new deck and an updated entrance.

Wild Mountain is owned by Sara Larsen (President). The general manager is Nathan Hakseth.

== Geography ==
Wild Mountain is located one hour northeast of the Twin Cities Metropolitan area. It is located 7 miles north of Taylors Falls.

== Historical Opening Dates ==
Wild Mountain is known nationally for its early opening dates for skiing and snowboarding. Below is a historical list of its opening dates.

Year	Day	Notes
1960 to 1981	no records	no records
1982	October 18	Earliest opening since opening of ski area in 1960.
1983 & 1984	no records	no records
1985	October 31	
1986	no records	no records
1987	November 9	$8 ticket
1988	October 26	$7 ticket
1989	November 4	$14 ticket, closed April 9
1990	October 19	
1991	October 18	1st ski area in the U.S to open.
1993	October 31	
1994	November 15	
1995	November 3	
1996	no records	no records
1997	October 27	
1998	November 4	
1999	November 3	$20 ticket. November 20–26, Daisy trail only for $6
2000	November 15	
2001	November 20	$20 ticket, Open November 24–27, November 30-5, then December 7 and beyond
2002	October 23	$10 ticket
2003	November 6	$12 ticket for Expressway, Daisy and Sunshine
2004	November 11	Snow on the ground by November 8, $6 Daisy ticket
2005	November 17	$15 ticket for Daisy and Sunshine
2006	November 1	$15 ticket for Expressway and Daisy. 100% open on January 3
2007	November 7	$16 ticket for Expressway
2008	October 28	$16 ticket for Expressway
2009	November 15	$16 ticket for Expressway
2010	October 29	$15 ticket for Expressway and Daisy through October 31. Reopened November 5–8, then November 14 and beyond. 100% open on November 27. First area in northern hemisphere to have 100% coverage.
2011	October 29	$10 ticket for Front Stage, Expressway added on November 18. Rained on Saturday of Thanksgiving weekend
2012	October 7	First ski area in U.S. to open. $18 for Daisy and Front Stage. 100% open on November 29 - First in North America to achieve that.
2013	October 22	$15 ticket or $10 with coupon. Front Stage trail open.
2014	October 31	$20 ticket for Front Stage. Added Expressway and Dandy on November 1
2015	November 20	Front Stage, Dandy and Expressway for $20. 100% open on December 30.
2016	November 12	$20 ticket for Front Stage, Dandy and Expressway
2017	October 29	$20 ticket for Front Stage trail
2018	October 21	$25 ticket for Front Stage
2019	October 29	$26 ticket for Front Stage
2020	October 19	First ski area in North America to open. $25 ticket for Front Stage.
2021	November 13	$15 ticket for Front Stage and Dandy
2022	October 18	First ski area in North America to open. $25 ticket for Front Stage.
2023	October 30	Closed November 14–25, then reopened for remainder of season.
2024	November 28	Opened with Expressway, Front Stage, Dandy, Chair 1 and Front Stage / Dandy Ropes $35 ticket
2025	November 10	Opened with Expressway, Front Stage, Dandy, Chair 1 and Front Stage / Dandy Ropes $35 ticket
