= Titcomb Mountain =

Ski area in Farmington, Maine

- Interactive map of Titcomb Mountain
- Location: Farmington, Maine, United States
- Nearest city: Augusta, Maine
- Coordinates: 44°39′0″N 70°10′15″W
- Top elevation: 750
- Base elevation: 400
- Skiable area: 45 acres (18 ha)
- Trails: 16
- Longest run: 2,200 feet (670 m)
- Lift system: 3
- Snowfall: 85 inches (220 cm)/year
- Website: www.titcombmountain.com

Titcomb Mountain is a ski hill located in Farmington, Maine, in the United States. It was established in 1939 and is run by the Farmington Ski Club. The mountain features a 350' vertical drop, 3 lifts (two T-Bars and a Pony lift), 16 trails, snowmaking and night skiing. Titcomb is a popular local family mountain with an active children's ski school, racing and other activities.

Titcomb Mountain maintains 16 km of cross-country ski trails groomed for skate and classic skiing.
