= Buena Vista Ski Area =

Ski area in Minnesota, United States

Coordinates: 47°39′29″N 94°52′45″W

Buena Vista Ski Area is a downhill ski and snowboard area located in Beltrami County, Minnesota, United States, near the city of Bemidji.

== History ==
Leonard R. Dickinson cleared the first ski run in 1936. The original chalet, constructed from a grain bin, was at the top of Beltrami's Bowl. In 1949 the first rope tow was installed, followed by chairlifts in 1975.
