= Powderhouse Hill (ski area) =

Ski area in South Berwick, Maine

Powderhouse Hill Ski Area

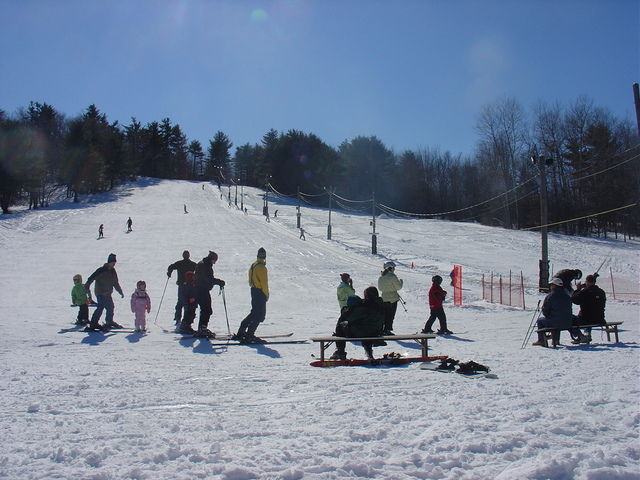
- A shot of the one slope on Powderhouse Hill
- Interactive map of Powderhouse Hill Ski Area
- Location: South Berwick, Maine, United States
- Nearest city: Portland, Maine
- Coordinates: 43°14′13″N 70°48′8″W
- Top elevation: 240 feet (73 m)
- Base elevation: 120 feet (37 m)
- Trails: 3
- Lift system: 1
- Website: www.powderhousehill.com

Powderhouse Hill is a community ski area owned by the Town of South Berwick, Maine and operated by the all-volunteer Powderhouse Ski Club. It consist of one rope tow, and three trails: 2 intermediate (66%) and 1 beginner (34%). Powderhouse Hill has no snowmaking thus its operation relies completely on natural snow.

== History ==
Thomas Butler and Elizabeth Butler settled in the town in 1698. They were the original owners of Powderhouse Hill, also called Butler Hill at the time.

When North Berwick, South Berwick and Berwick, Maine were all one big town, a town meeting was called for the construction of a powder house. It was decided that it should be on Butler’s Hill, thus being renamed Powderhouse Hill after the powder house.

In August 1851, several arson fires were reported in South Berwick. First, arsonists burned down Hayes House on Academy Street and then the powder house on Butler Hill.

Powderhouse Ski Area was formed by William Hardy of Eliot, Maine. An avid skier, he had previously run similar operations on Barnards hill in Eliot then leased the land for where Powderhouse is today. The Hardy Family ran the operation, selling snacks, coffee, and running the rope tow until ownership was transferred years later.

The painter of the original Powderhouse Hill sign is unknown, but the sign was repainted in 2019 by locals from York, 11 year old Leah J. and her father. The sign now hangs above the small ski house.

A Ford Model A was converted to run a rope tow up Powderhouse Hill. The Powderhouse Hill Ski Club was incorporated on December 14, 1964. Powderhouse Hill is one of the oldest operating ski areas in the entire country.

A snow machine gun was added to the facility in time for the 2013-2014 winter season.
