= Ferguson Ridge Ski Area =

Ski area in Oregon, United States

Coordinates: 45.28209°N 117.11285°W

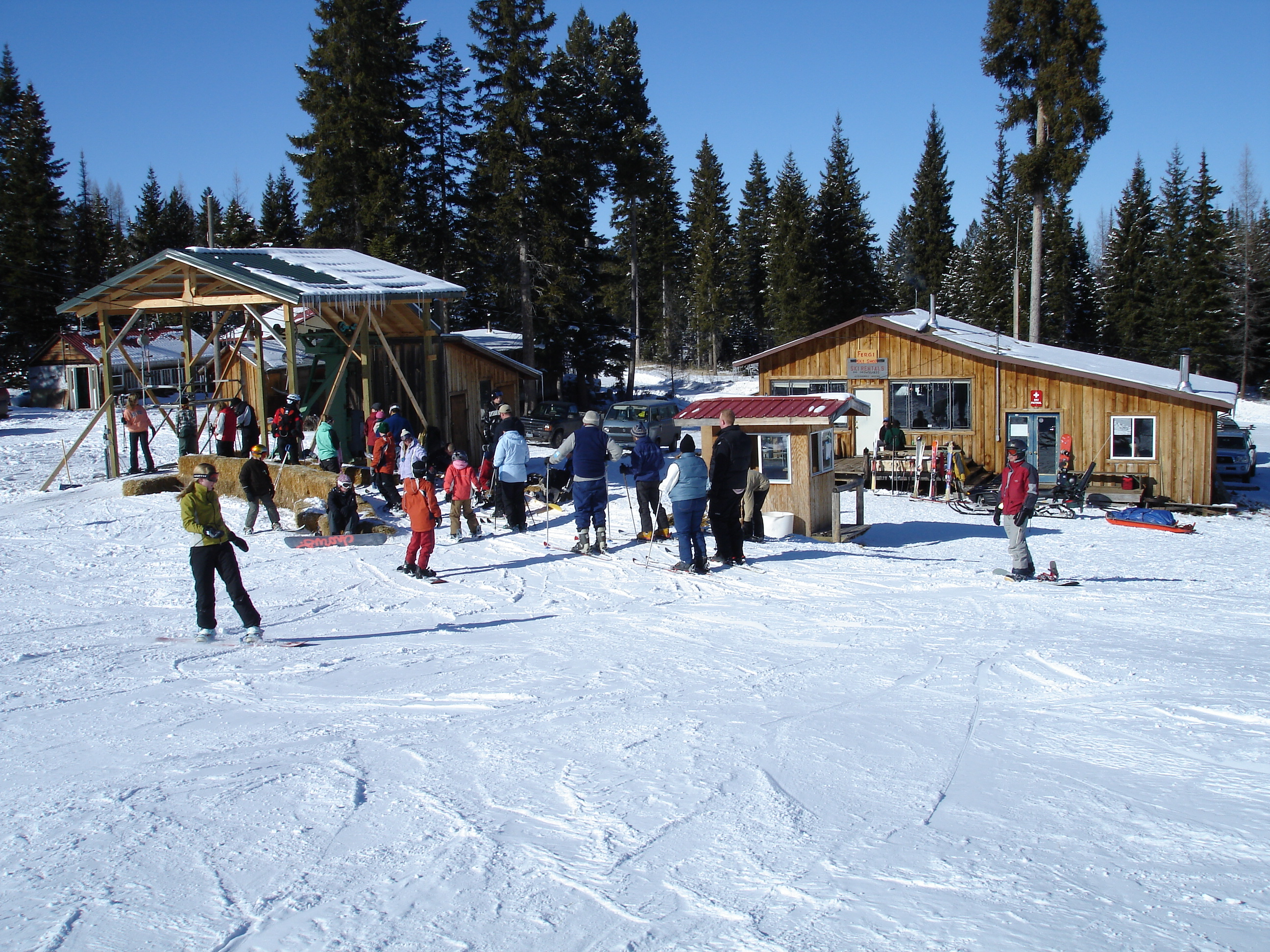
- Base of Ferguson Ridge Ski Area
- Interactive map of Ferguson Ridge Ski Area
- Location: Wallowa Mountains, Oregon, US
- Nearest city: Joseph, Oregon (8 miles northwest)
- Top elevation: 5,840 feet (1,780 m)
- Base elevation: 5,200 feet (1,600 m)
- Skiable area: 170 acres (69 ha)
- Trails: 8
- Longest run: 1.2 m (3 ft 11 in)
- Lift system: 1 T-bar lift, 1 rope tow
- Snowfall: 25 ft (7.5 m)
- Website: www.SkiFergi.com

Ferguson Ridge Ski Area (referred to locally as "Fergi") is a small ski area in northeastern Oregon located about 9 miles (14 km) southeast of Joseph in the Wallowa mountains and near the Eagle Cap Wilderness. It's a small, community-run ski area, volunteer operated by the Eagle Cap Ski Club. Ferguson Ridge is open weekends and holidays 10AM-4PM when there is sufficient snow cover.

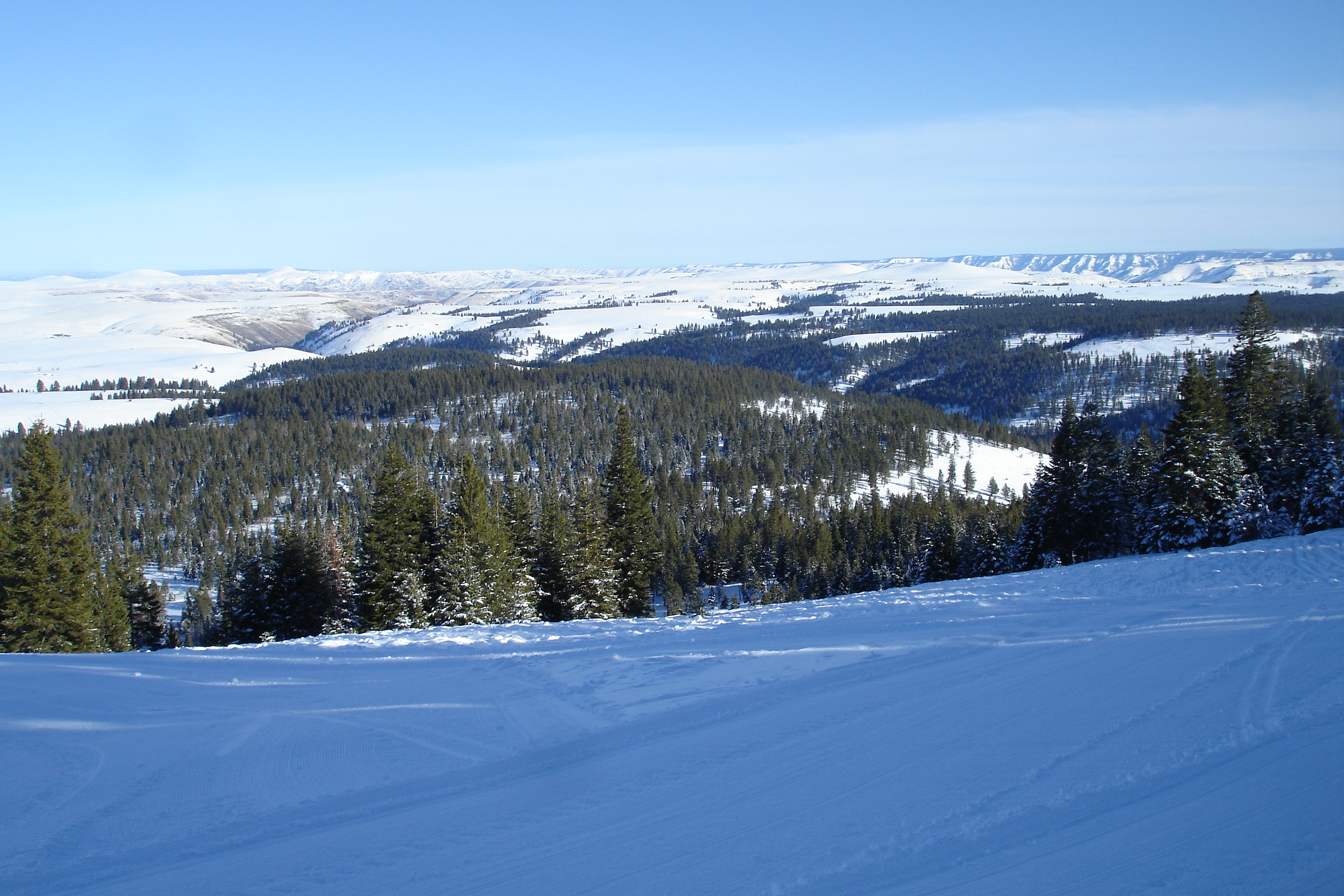
View from the top of Ferguson Ridge Ski Area - overlooking the Hells Canyon & Imnaha River country.
