= Arctic Valley Ski Area =

Ski area in Alaska, United States

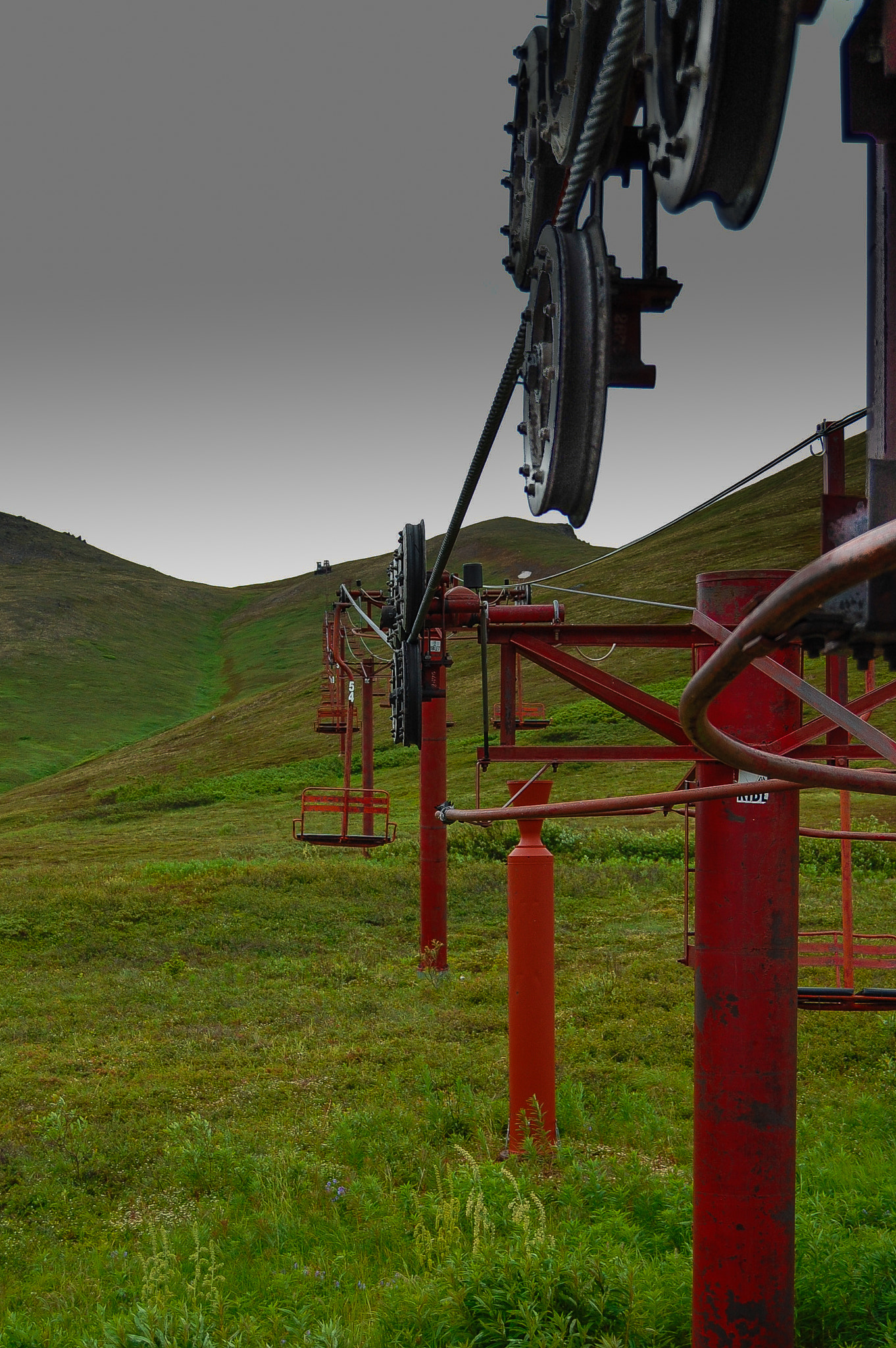
- View of the chairlift during the offseason

- Location in Alaska Arctic Valley Ski Area (North America)
- Location: Anchorage, Alaska, USA
- Coordinates: 61°14′48″N 149°39′02″W
- Vertical: 1,500 ft (460 m)
- Top elevation: 4,000 ft (1,200 m)
- Base elevation: 2,500 ft (760 m)
- Skiable area: 320 acres (1.3 km^{2})
- Trails: 24: 10% Beginner; 40% Intermediate; 50% Advanced
- Lift system: 2 double chairs, 1 T-bar
- Website: arcticvalley.org

Arctic Valley Ski Area, formerly known as Alpenglow at Arctic Valley, is a nonprofit ski area in Anchorage, Alaska. It is located on Ski Bowl Road in Chugach State Park, in the upper Ship Creek valley adjacent to Joint Base Elmendorf-Richardson. Its main competitor is Alyeska Resort.

The area encompasses nearly 500 acres (2.0 km^{2}) with a base elevation of 2,500 feet (760 m) and rises to almost 4,000 feet (1,200 m) at Rendezvous Peak. Arctic Valley has two chair lifts, one platter lift, one rope tow, a tubing lift, and four bowls. The ski area is operated by the Anchorage Ski Club under a concession agreement with Chugach State Park.

Arctic Valley is open for skiing and riding only at weekends until spring, when Thursdays and Fridays are added to the schedule. Tubing is open Thursday-Sunday from Thanksgiving weekend to the first weekend in April.

== History ==
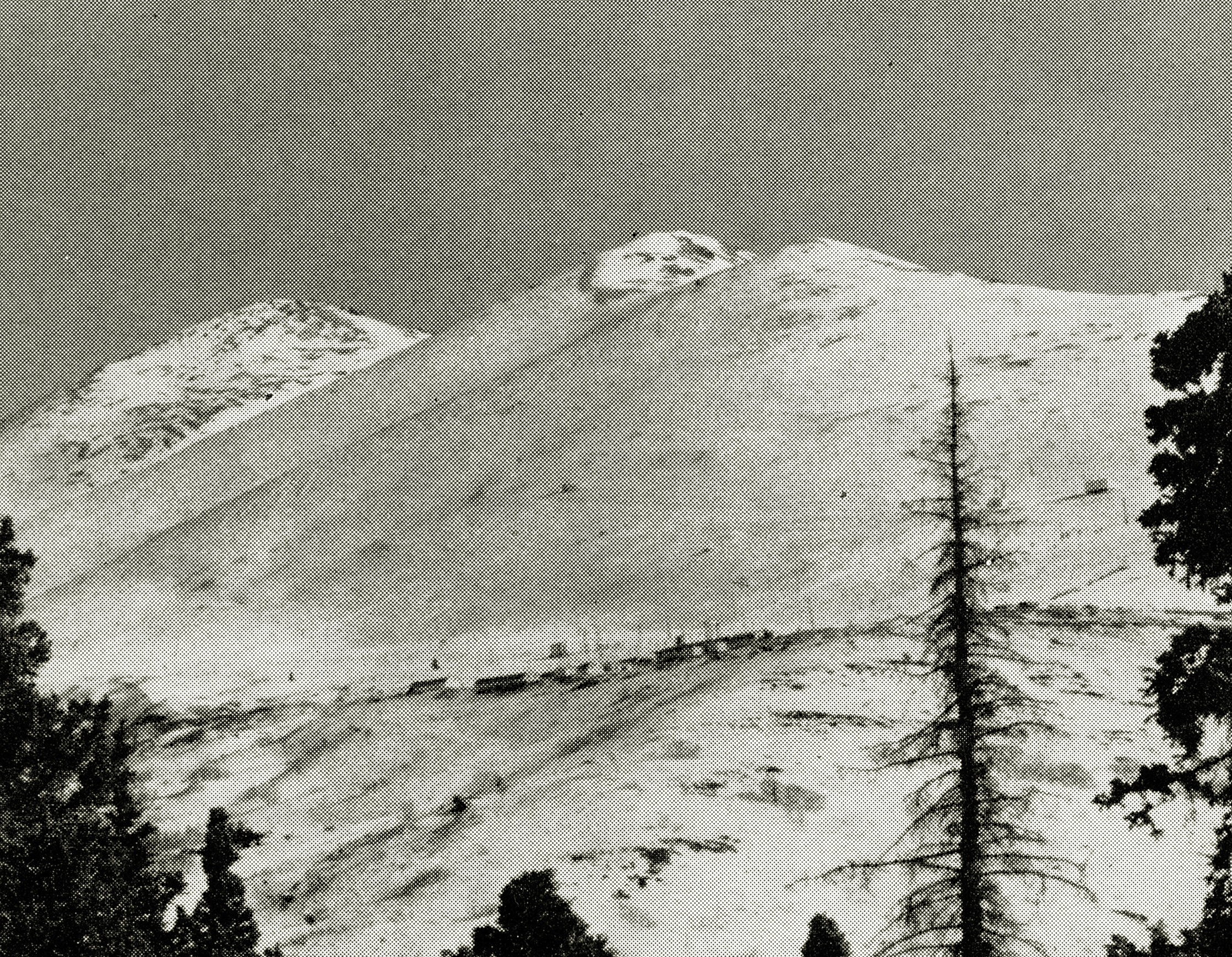
View from the valley floor, taken winter 1949-1950.

The Anchorage Ski Club was founded in 1937 by Al Corey and Ralph Soberg. Arctic Valley Ski Area was opened by the group in 1949. The Army used to operate an adjacent ski area just south of the current facilities, which was removed in the early 2000s. The Anchorage Ski Club also has an area use permit for additional neighboring acreage in Chugach State Park.

Arctic Valley is the only multiple-chair ski area located within 20 miles (32 km) of Anchorage.

In 2012, Arctic Valley opened a tubing park serviced by a pony tow lift. This is the only tubing park open to the general public in southcentral Alaska.
