= Mount Kato =

Ski area in Minnesota, United States

Coordinates: 44°07′53″N 94°02′11″W

- Interactive map of Mount Kato
- Location: Mankato Township, Blue Earth County, Minnesota, U.S.
- Nearest city: Skyline, Minnesota, also near Mankato, Minnesota
- Vertical: 240 feet (73 m)
- Top elevation: 840 feet (260 m)
- Skiable area: 55 acres (220,000 m^{2})
- Trails: 19 total
- Lift system: 11 total
- Snowfall: 50 inches/year
- Website: www.mountkato.com

Mount Kato is a winter sports facility in Minnesota, offering facilities for skiing, snowboarding, snow tubing and mountain biking. Mount Kato offers 19 trails on 55 acres (220,000 m^{2}). Mount Kato has a vertical drop of 240 feet (73 m). It is located just south of the city of Skyline in the Mankato metropolitan area.
