= List of ski areas and resorts in the United States =

US alpine ski areas

The number of snow ski areas and resorts in the United States peaked in the late 1960s at around 1000 areas. Since then many small, rope-tow only areas have closed or consolidated. The following listing accounts for US ski areas that are currently operational. It is restricted to ski lift–served alpine skiing areas, both public and private.

According to the National Ski Areas Association, 37 U.S. states have operating ski areas with a total 486 nationwide as of 2024.

The Storm Skiing Journal and Podcast news blog lists 503 separate, (Note: "To summarize: shuttle (equals) separate ski areas; lift, trail, or short walk (equals) one ski area. There are only a handful of ski areas in America that required application of this calculus.") non-private, (Note: "By 'private,' I mean, 'some dude put a ropetow in his backyard for his own personal use.' I do include private ski areas, such as Holimont in New York or Yellowstone Club in Montana, on this list, but both offer a means to join, even if those means are beyond the reach of the average human’s checkbook.") lift-served, "active ski areas" as of October 16, 2003. Of the 503 that are on Storm Skiing's list 102 have only surface lifts; 401 have one or more chairlifts; and 45 are private or semi-private, where there is some membership, enrollment, residency, or lodging requirement. Of the 503 ski areas, 390 are "public U.S. ski areas that run chairlifts" and "113 either run only surface lifts, or are not open to the general public", says to Storm Skiing. Of the 390 public, chairlift areas, 233 or 60% have joined one or more United States–based, international multi-mountain ski pass, according to Storm Skiing.

== New England ==
=== Connecticut ===
Ski areas in Connecticut
- Mohawk Mountain Ski Area – Cornwall
- Mount Southington – Plantsville
- Powder Ridge Ski Area – Middlefield
- Ski Sundown – New Hartford

=== Maine ===
Ski areas in Maine
- Baker Mountain – Bingham
- Big Rock – Mars Hill
- Big Moose – Greenville
- Black Mountain of Maine – Rumford
- Camden Snow Bowl – Camden
- Eaton Mountain – Skowhegan
- Hermon Mountain – Hermon
- Lonesome Pine Trails – Fort Kent
- Lost Valley – Auburn
- Mount Abram – Greenwood
- Mount Jefferson Ski Area – Lee
- Pinnacle Ski Club – Pittsfield
- Pleasant Mountain – Bridgton
- Powderhouse Hill – South Berwick
- Quoggy Jo – Presque Isle
- Saddleback Maine – Rangeley
- Sugarloaf – Carrabassett Valley
- Sunday River – Newry
- Titcomb Mountain – Farmington

=== Massachusetts ===
Ski areas in Massachusetts
- Berkshire East Ski Resort – Charlemont
- Blue Hills Ski Area – Canton
- Bousquet Ski Area – Pittsfield
- Butternut – Great Barrington
- Easton Ski Area at Eaglebrook School (private)
- Jiminy Peak – Hancock
- Mount Greylock Ski Club – Williamstown (private)
- Nashoba Valley Ski Area – Westford
- Otis Ridge – Otis
- Ski Bradford – Haverhill
- Ski Ward – Shrewsbury
- Wachusett Mountain – Princeton

=== New Hampshire ===
Ski areas in New Hampshire
- Abenaki Ski Area – Wolfeboro
- Arrowhead – Claremont
- Attitash – Bartlett
- Black Mountain – Jackson
- Bretton Woods – Bretton Woods
- Cannon Mountain – Franconia Notch
- Campton Mountain – Campton
- Cranmore Mountain Resort – North Conway
- Crotched Mountain – Bennington
- Dartmouth Skiway – Lyme
- Franklin Veterans Memorial Recreation Area – Franklin
- Granite Gorge – Keene
- Gunstock Mountain Resort – Gilford
- Kanc Rec Area – Lincoln
- King Pine – East Madison
- Loon Mountain – Lincoln
- McIntyre Ski Area – Manchester
- Mount Eustis – Littleton
- Mount Prospect – Lancaster
- Mount Sunapee Resort – Sunapee
- Pats Peak – Henniker
- Ragged Mountain – Danbury
- Red Hill Ski Club – Moultonborough
- Storrs Hill – Lebanon
- Tenney Mountain Ski Resort – Plymouth
- The Balsams Wilderness – Dixville Notch (temporarily closed)
- Waterville Valley Resort – Waterville Valley
- Whaleback – Enfield
- Wildcat Mountain – Pinkham Notch

=== Rhode Island ===
Ski areas in Rhode Island
- Yawgoo Valley – Exeter

=== Vermont ===
Ski areas in Vermont
- Ascutney Outdoors – Brownsville
- Bellows Falls Ski Tow – Bellows Falls
- Bolton Valley Resort – Bolton Valley
- Bromley Mountain – Peru
- Burke Mountain – East Burke
- Cochran's Ski Area – Richmond
- Harrington Hill – Strafford
- Hard 'Ack – St. Albans
- Haystack Mountain – Wilmington (private)
- Jay Peak Resort – Jay
- Killington Ski Resort – Killington
- Living Memorial Park – Brattleboro
- Lyndon Outing Club – Lyndon
- Mad River Glen – Fayston (ski only)
- Magic Mountain – Londonderry
- Middlebury College Snow Bowl – Hancock
- Mount Snow – West Dover
- Northeast Slopes – East Corinth
- Okemo Mountain – Ludlow
- Pico Mountain – Killington
- Plymouth Notch – Plymouth (private)
- Quechee Lakes Ski Area – Quechee (private)
- Saskadena Six – South Pomfret
- Smugglers' Notch – Jeffersonville
- Stowe Mountain Resort – Stowe
- Stratton Mountain Resort – Stratton Mountain
- Sugarbush Resort – Warren

== Mid-Atlantic ==
=== Maryland ===
Ski areas in Maryland
- Wisp Ski Resort – McHenry

=== New Jersey ===
Ski areas in New Jersey
- Big Snow American Dream – East Rutherford (indoor)
- Campgaw Mountain – Mahwah
- Hidden Valley – Vernon
- Mountain Creek – Vernon

=== New York ===
- Beartown Ski Area – Plattsburgh
- Belleayre Ski Center – Highmount
- Big Tupper Ski Area – Tupper Lake
- Brantling Ski Slopes – Sodus
- Bristol Mountain Ski Resort – South Bristol
- Buffalo Ski Club – Colden
- Catamount Ski Area – Hillsdale
- Dry Hill Ski Area – Watertown
- Gore Mountain – North Creek
- Greek Peak – Virgil
- Hickory Ski Center – Warrensburg
- Holiday Valley – Ellicottville
- Holiday Mountain Ski & Fun – Monticello
- Holimont – Ellicottville
- Hunter Mountain – Hunter
- Kissing Bridge – Colden
- Labrador Mountain – Truxton
- Mount Peter Ski Area – Warwick
- McCauley Mountain – Old Forge
- Oak Mountain – Speculator
- Peek'n Peak – Clymer
- Plattekill Mountain – Roxbury
- Royal Mountain – Caroga
- Song Mountain Resort – Tully
- Snow Ridge Ski Resort – Turin
- Swain – Swain
- Sugar Hill – Sugar Hill
- Thunder Ridge Ski Area – Patterson
- Titus Mountain – Malone
- Toggenburg Mountain – Fabius
- West Mountain – Glens Falls
- Willard Mountain – Greenwich
- Whiteface Mountain – Wilmington
- Windham Mountain – Windham
- Woods Valley Ski Resort – Westernville
- Victor Constant Ski Area – West Point

=== Pennsylvania ===
- Bear Creek Mountain Resort – Macungie
- Blue Knob All Seasons Resort – Claysburg
- Blue Mountain Resort – Palmerton
- Boyce Park – Plum
- Camelback Mountain Resort – Tannersville
- Eagle Rock Resort – Hazleton
- Elk Mountain – Union Dale
- Hidden Valley Four Seasons Resort – Hidden Valley
- Jack Frost Big Boulder – Blakeslee
- Laurel Mountain Ski Resort – Ligonier
- Liberty Mountain Resort – Carroll Valley
- Montage Mountain Ski Resort – Scranton
- Mountain View at Edinboro – Edinboro
- Seven Springs Mountain Resort – Seven Springs
- Shawnee Mountain Ski Area – East Stroudsburg
- Ski Big Bear – Lackawaxen
- Ski Denton – Coudersport
- Ski Roundtop – Lewisberry
- Spring Mountain – Schwenksville
- Ski Sawmill – Morris
- Tussey Mountain Ski Area – State College
- Whitetail Ski Resort – Mercersburg

== Southeast ==
=== Alabama ===
Ski areas in Alabama
- Cloudmont Ski & Golf Resort – Mentone

=== North Carolina ===
Ski areas in North Carolina
- Appalachian Ski Mountain – Blowing Rock
- Cataloochee Ski Area – Maggie Valley
- Sapphire Valley – Sapphire
- Ski Beech – Beech Mountain
- Sugar Mountain – Sugar Mountain
- Hatley Pointe – Mars Hill

=== Tennessee ===
Ski areas in Tennessee
- Ober Gatlinburg – Gatlinburg

=== Texas ===
Ski areas in Texas
- Mount Aggie Ski Slope – College Station (private) (no lift access) (artificial turf) temporarily closed as of 2025

=== Virginia ===
Ski areas in Virginia
- Bryce Resort – Basye-Bryce Mountain
- Massanutten Ski Resort – Massanutten
- The Homestead – Hot Springs
- Wintergreen Resort – Wintergreen

=== West Virginia ===
Ski areas in West Virginia
- Canaan Valley Resort – Davis
- Oglebay Resort – Wheeling
- Snowshoe Mountain – Snowshoe
- Timberline Mountain – Davis
- Winterplace – Ghent

== Midwest ==
=== Illinois ===
Ski areas in Illinois
- Chestnut Mountain Resort – Galena
- Ski Four Lakes – Lisle
- Raging Buffalo Snowboard Park – Algonquin
- Ski Snowstar – Andalusia
- Villa Olivia – Bartlett

=== Indiana ===
Ski areas in Indiana
- Paoli Peaks – Paoli
- Perfect North Slopes – Lawrenceburg

=== Iowa ===
Ski areas in Iowa
- Mt. Crescent Ski Area – Crescent
- Seven Oaks Snow Ski Area – Boone
- Sleepy Hollow Sports Park – Des Moines
- Sundown Mountain Resort – Dubuque

=== Michigan ===
Ski areas in Michigan
- Alpine Valley – White Lake
- Big Powderhorn Mountain – Bessemer
- Bittersweet Ski Resort – Otsego
- Boyne Mountain Resort – Boyne Falls
- Caberfae Peaks Ski & Golf Resort – Cadillac
- Cannonsburg Ski Area – Cannonsburg
- Challenge Mountain – Boyne City
- Crystal Mountain Resort & Spa – Thompsonville
- Hickory Hills Ski Area – Traverse City
- The Highlands at Harbor Springs – Harbor Springs
- The Homestead – Glen Arbor
- Marquette Mountain – Marquette
- Mont Ripley Ski Resort – Houghton
- Mount Bohemia – Lac La Belle
- Mt. Brighton Ski Resort – Brighton
- Mt. Holiday – Traverse City
- Mt. Holly Ski and Snowboard Resort – Holly
- Mt. McSauba Recreation Area – Charlevoix
- Mt. Zion Ski Area – Ironwood
- Mulligan's Hollow Ski Bowl – Grand Haven
- Norway Mountain Ski and Snowboard Resort – Norway
- Nub's Nob – Harbor Springs
- Otsego Club & Resort – Gaylord
- Petoskey Winter Sports Park – Petoskey
- Pine Knob Ski Resort – Clarkston
- Pine Mountain Resort – Iron Mountain
- Porcupine Mountains Ski Area – Silver City
- Shanty Creek Resorts – Bellaire
- Ski Brule – Iron River
- Snow Snake Ski & Golf – Harrison
- Snow River Mountain Resort – Bessemer
- Swiss Valley Ski and Snowboard Area – Jones
- Timber Ridge Ski Area – Gobles
- Treetops Resort – Gaylord

=== Minnesota ===
- Afton Alps – Afton
- Andes Tower Hills – Kensington
- Buck Hill – Burnsville
- Buena Vista Ski Area – Bemidji
- Chester Bowl Park – Duluth
- Coffee Mill Ski Area – Wabasha
- Detroit Mountain – Detroit Lakes
- Elm Creek - Maple Grove
- Giants Ridge – Biwabik
- Hyland Ski and Snowboard Area – Bloomington
- Lutsen Mountains – Lutsen
- Mount Itasca – Coleraine
- Mount Kato – Mankato
- Powder Ridge – Kimball
- Ski Gull – Nisswa
- Spirit Mountain – Duluth
- Welch Village – Welch
- Wild Mountain – Taylors Falls

=== Missouri ===
Ski areas in Missouri
- Hidden Valley Ski Area — Wildwood
- Snow Creek — Weston

=== North Dakota ===
Ski areas in North Dakota
- Bottineau Winter Park – Bottineau
- Frost Fire – Walhalla
- Huff Hills – Huff

=== Ohio ===
Ski areas in Ohio
- Alpine Valley Ski Area – Chesterland
- Big Creek Ski Area – Concord
- Boston Mills/Brandywine Ski Resort – Peninsula
- Mad River Mountain – Bellefontaine
- Snow Trails Ski Resort – Mansfield

=== South Dakota ===
Ski areas in South Dakota
- Mystic Miner Ski Resort – Lead
- Great Bear Recreation Park – Sioux Falls
- Terry Peak Ski Area – Lead

=== Wisconsin ===
Ski areas in Wisconsin
- Alpine Valley Resort – East Troy
- Ausblick Ski Club – Sussex (private)
- Badlands Sno-Park – Hudson
- Book Across the Bay – Ashland
- Blackhawk Ski Club – Middleton (private)
- Bruce Mound Winter Sports Area – Merrillan
- Camp 10 – Rhinelander
- Cascade Mountain – Portage
- Christie Mountain – Bruce
- Christmas Mountain Village – Wisconsin Dells
- Crystal Ridge – Franklin
- Devils Head Resort – Baraboo
- Fox Hill Ski Area – West Bend (private)
- Granite Peak – Wausau
- Heiliger Huegel Ski Club – Hubertus (private)
- Kettlebowl – Bryant
- Kewaunee County Winter Park Ski Hill – Kewaunee County, Wisconsin § Parks and other lands open to the public
- Keyes Peak – Florence
- Little Switzerland Ski Area – Slinger
- Mont Du Lac – Superior
- The Mountain Top at Grand Geneva Resort – Lake Geneva
- Mt. Ashwabay – Bayfield
- Mt. LaCrosse – LaCrosse
- Navarino Slopes – Navarino
- Nordic Mountain – Mount Morris
- Nutt Hill – Plymouth
- Powers Bluff – Arpin
- Standing Rocks – Stevens Point
- Sunburst Ski Area – Kewaskum
- Telemark Lodge – Cable
- Triangle Sports Area – Green Bay
- Trollhaugen – Dresser
- Tyrol Basin – Mount Horeb
- Whitecap Mountains – Montreal
- Whitetail Ridge – Fort McCoy
- Wilmot Mountain – Wilmot

== Rocky Mountains ==
=== Arizona ===
Ski areas in Arizona
- Arizona Snowbowl – Flagstaff
- Elk Ridge Ski Area – Williams
- Mount Lemmon Ski Valley – Summerhaven
- Sunrise Park Resort – Greer

=== Colorado ===
Ski areas in Colorado
- Arapahoe Basin – Keystone
- Aspen/Snowmass – Aspen and Snowmass Village
  - Aspen Highlands
  - Aspen Mountain
  - Buttermilk
  - Snowmass
- Beaver Creek Resort – Beaver Creek
- Breckenridge Ski Resort – Breckenridge
- Chapman Hill Ski Area – Durango
- Copper Mountain Resort – Copper Mountain
- Cranor Ski Area – Gunnison
- Crested Butte Mountain Resort – Mount Crested Butte
- Echo Mountain Resort – Evergreen
- Eldora Mountain Resort – Eldora
- Hesperus Ski Area – Hesperus
- Howelsen Hill Ski Area – Steamboat Springs
- Kendall Mountain Ski Area – Silverton
- Keystone Resort – Keystone
- Lake City Ski Hill – Lake City
- Loveland Ski Area – Georgetown
  - Loveland Valley
- Monarch Ski Area – Salida
- Powderhorn Resort – Mesa
- Purgatory Resort – Durango
- Silverton Mountain – Silverton
- Ski Cooper – Leadville
- Ski Granby Ranch – Granby
- Steamboat Ski Resort – Steamboat Springs
- Sunlight Ski Area – Glenwood Springs
- Telluride Ski Resort – Telluride
- Vail Ski Resort – Vail
- Winter Park Resort – Winter Park
- Wolf Creek ski area – Pagosa Springs

=== Idaho ===
Ski areas in Idaho
- Bald Mountain – Pierce
- Bogus Basin – Boise
- Brundage Mountain – McCall
- Cottonwood Butte – Cottonwood
- Kelly Canyon – Ririe
- Little Ski Hill – McCall
- Lookout Pass – Mullan
- Lost Trail Powder Mountain – North Fork
- Magic Mountain – Hansen
- Pebble Creek – Inkom
- Pine Street Ski Area – Sandpoint
- Pomerelle – Albion
- Rotarun – Hailey
- Schweitzer Mountain – Sandpoint
- Silver Mountain – Kellogg
- Snowhaven – Grangeville
- Soldier Mountain – Fairfield
- Sun Valley – Ketchum
- Tamarack – Donnelly

=== Montana ===
Ski areas in Montana
- Bear Paw Ski Bowl – Havre
- Big Sky – Big Sky
- Blacktail Mountain – Lakeside
- Bridger Bowl – Bozeman
- Discovery – Anaconda
- Great Divide – Marysville
- Lost Trail Powder Mountain – Conner
- Maverick Mountain – Polaris
- Montana Snowbowl – Missoula
- Moonlight Basin – Big Sky
- Red Lodge Mountain – Red Lodge
- Showdown – Neihart
- Teton Pass – Choteau
- Turner Mountain – Libby
- Whitefish Mountain Resort – Whitefish
- Yellowstone Club – Big Sky (private)

=== New Mexico ===
Ski areas in New Mexico
- Angel Fire Resort – Angel Fire
- Pajarito Mountain – Los Alamos
- Red River Ski Area – Red River
- Sandia Peak – Albuquerque
- Sipapu – Vadito
- Ski Apache – Ruidoso
- Ski Cloudcroft – Cloudcroft
- Ski Santa Fe – Santa Fe
- Taos Ski Valley – Taos

=== Utah ===
Ski areas in Utah
- Alta – Alta (ski only)
- Beaver Mountain – Logan Canyon
- Brian Head – Brian Head
- Brighton – Big Cottonwood Canyon
- Cherry Peak Resort – Richmond
- Deer Valley – Park City (ski only)
- Eagle Point Ski Resort – Beaver
- Nordic Valley – Eden
- Park City Mountain Resort – Park City
- Powder Mountain – Eden
- Snowbasin – Huntsville
- Snowbird – Snowbird
- Solitude – Big Cottonwood Canyon
- Sundance – Provo
- Woodward Park City – Park City

=== Wyoming ===
Ski areas in Wyoming
- Antelope Butte Mountain Recreational Area – Shell
- Beartooth Basin Summer Ski Area – via Red Lodge
- Grand Targhee – Alta
- Hogadon – Casper
- Jackson Hole – Teton Village
- Meadowlark Ski Lodge – Ten Sleep
- Pine Creek – Cokeville
- Sleeping Giant Ski Area & Zipline – Cody
- Snow King Mountain – Jackson
- Snowy Range – Centennial
- White Pine – Pinedale

== West Coast ==
=== Alaska ===
Ski areas in Alaska
- Arctic Valley – Anchorage
- Alyeska – Girdwood
- Eaglecrest – Juneau
- Hilltop – Anchorage
- Majestic Heli Ski – Glacier View
- Moose Mountain – Fairbanks
- Mount Eyak – Cordova
- Ski Land – Fairbanks
- Skeetawk - Hatcher Pass

=== California ===
Ski areas in California
- Alpine Meadows – Alpine Meadows
- Alta Sierra – Wofford Heights
- Badger Pass – Yosemite National Park
- Bear Mountain – Big Bear Lake
- Bear Valley – Angels Camp
- Boreal Mountain – Soda Springs
- Buckhorn Ski Club – Three Points (private)
- China Peak – Lakeshore
- Coppervale Ski Area – Susanville
- Dodge Ridge – Sonora
- Donner Ski Ranch – Norden
- Granlibakken – Tahoe City
- Heavenly Mountain – South Lake Tahoe
- Homewood Mountain – Homewood
- June Mountain – June Lake
- Kirkwood Mountain – Kirkwood
- Mammoth Mountain – Mammoth Lakes
- Mount Baldy Ski Lifts – Mount Baldy
- Mount Shasta Ski Park – Mount Shasta
- Mount Waterman – Three Points
- Mountain High – Wrightwood
- Northstar California – Truckee
- Palisades Tahoe – Olympic Valley
- Sierra-at-Tahoe – Twin Bridges
- Snow Summit – Big Bear Lake
- Snow Valley – Running Springs
- Soda Springs – Soda Springs
- Sugar Bowl – Norden
- Tahoe Donner Downhill – Truckee

=== Nevada ===
Ski areas in Nevada
- Diamond Peak – Incline Village
- Elko Snobowl Ski and Bike Park – Elko
- Las Vegas Ski and Snowboard Resort (Lee Canyon) – Las Vegas
- Mount Rose – Reno
- Sky Tavern Ski Area – Reno

=== Oregon ===
Ski areas in Oregon
- Anthony Lakes – North Powder
- Cooper Spur – Parkdale
- Ferguson Ridge – Joseph
- Hoodoo – Sisters
- Mount Ashland – Ashland
- Mount Bachelor – Bend
- Mount Hood Meadows – Government Camp
- Mount Hood Skibowl – Government Camp
- Timberline Lodge – Government Camp
  - Summit Pass
- Warner Canyon – Lakeview
- Willamette Pass – Odell Lake

=== Washington ===
Ski areas in Washington
- 49 Degrees North – Chewelah
- Badger Mountain – Waterville
- Crystal Mountain – near Enumclaw
- Echo Valley – Chelan
- Hurricane Ridge – near Port Angeles
- Leavenworth Ski Hill – Leavenworth
- Loup Loup Ski Bowl – near Twisp
- Meany Lodge – Stampede Pass (private)
- Mission Ridge – near Wenatchee
- Mt. Baker – Glacier
- Mount Spokane – near Spokane
- Sahalie Ski Club – Snoqualmie Pass (private)
- Sitzmark Ski Area – Tonasket
- Ski Bluewood – near Dayton
- Stevens Pass – Stevens Pass
- The Summit at Snoqualmie – Snoqualmie Pass
  - Alpental
  - Summit Central
  - Summit East
  - Summit West
- White Pass – White Pass

== See also ==
- Comparison of North American ski resorts
- List of ski areas and resorts
- List of ski areas and resorts in Canada
- List of ski jumping venues in the United States
- List of tourist attractions worldwide
