= List of New Mexico ski resorts =

Being a US Mountain State, winter sports recreation is a popular pastime in New Mexico, and accommodates skiers at its many ski resorts and ski areas. It includes Ski Apache, the southernmost major ski resort in the continental United States. Other ski areas in New Mexico include:

== List of ski areas ==
=== Active ski areas ===
- Angel Fire Resort
- Enchanted Forest Cross Country Ski Area
- Pajarito Mountain Ski Area
- Red River Ski & Summer Area
- Sandia Peak Ski Area (New Mexico's first ski area, 1936)
  - Sandia Peak Tramway (longest aerial tramway in the Americas)
- Sipapu Ski & Summer Resort
- Ski Cloudcroft
- Ski Santa Fe
- Ski Apache (southernmost major ski resort in the US, first gondola lift in the US)
- Taos Ski Valley

=== Former ski areas ===
- Agua Piedra
- Cedar Creek
- Eagle Creek
- Hyde State Park
- Powder Puff
- Sawyer's Hill
- Singing River Ranch
- Ski Rio
- Ski Sugarite
- Val Verde
- Woodlands

== See also ==
- List of ski areas and resorts in the United States
- List of Colorado ski resorts
- Comparison of New Mexico ski resorts
