= Comparison of New Mexico ski resorts =

World-class ski resorts located in the Southwestern state of New Mexico includes the southernmost major ski resort in the United States, as well as the longest aerial tramway in the Americas. The following table is comparison of their various sizes, runs, lifts, and snowfall:

Name	Nearest city	Skiable area (acres)	Top elevation (feet)	Base elevation (feet)	Vertical (feet)	Runs	Lifts	Snowfall (in/year)	Date Statistics Updated
Angel Fire Resort	Angel Fire	560	10,677	8,600	2,077	80	7	210	November 2021
Chama Cross Country	Chama		9,000	7,800	1,200		0	100	October 2021
Enchanted Forest Cross Country Ski Area	Taos		10,078	9,800	475	33	0	240	October 2021
Pajarito Mountain Ski Area	Los Alamos	750	10,440	9,000	1,440	44	5	137	September 2023
Red River Ski & Summer Area	Red River	209	10,350	8,750	1,600	64	7	214	November 2021
Sandia Peak Ski Area	Albuquerque	200	10,378	8,678	1,700	30	6	125	March 2021
Sipapu Ski & Summer Resort	Vadito	215	9,255	8,200	1,055	41	6	185	March 2021
Ski Cloudcroft	Cloudcroft	74	9,100	8,400	700	24	2	120	December 2020
Ski Santa Fe	Santa Fe	660	12,075	10,350	1,725	68	7	225	March 2021
Ski Apache	Ruidoso	750	11,500	9,600	1,900	55	8	180	November 2021
Taos Ski Valley	Taos Ski Valley	1,294	12,481	9,200	3,281	110	14	300	November 2021

== See also ==
- Comparison of California ski resorts
- Comparison of Colorado ski resorts
- Comparison of North American ski resorts
- Comparison of Southeastern United States ski resorts
- List of ski areas and resorts in the United States
