= Partek =

American ski lift manufacturer

Partek Ski Lifts
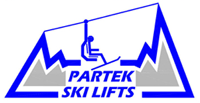
- Industry: Aerial lift manufacturer
- Founded: 1996
- Fate: Buyout
- Key people: Hagen Schulz (CEO)
- Products: Ski lifts
- Website: www.partekskilifts.com

Partek Ski Lifts, commonly known as Partek, is a chairlift manufacturer based in Pine Island, New York. It was founded in 1996 as the successor to Borvig, who went out of business in 1993. The company was founded by Hagen Schulz, the son of Borvig's President Gary Schulz. The company was also the official parts distributor for Borvig lifts.

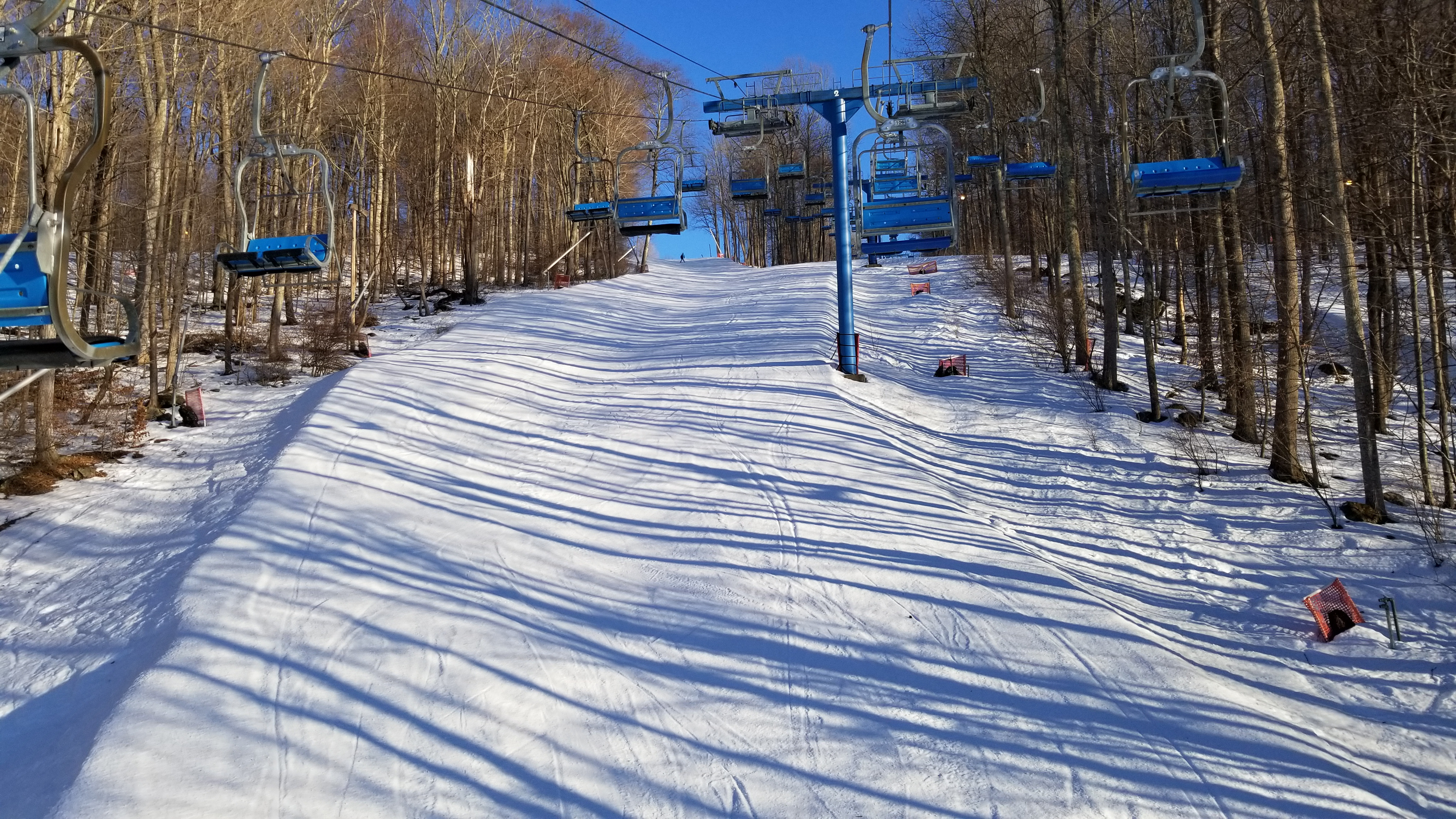
A Partek Double-Double Ski Lift at Shawnee Mountain Ski Area, PA

In 2004, Partek had announced that it was developing a detachable chairlift system, however, development was ceased when the company was purchased in 2005. The company's designs were purchased by Doppelmayr CTEC and a non-compete agreement regarding new installations using the designs was established. Also included in the purchase were Partek's rights to Borvig lifts. After the purchase, Partek president Hagen Schulz became a sales consultant at Doppelmayr CTEC, and started a new company, Ski Lift Parts Inc.

The five-year non-compete agreement expired in 2009 and Partek resumed installation of new lifts using its designs.

Between 1996 and 2005, Partek installed 24 lifts in North America. Starting in 2009, Partek has installed over nine additional lifts and continues to service Borvig installation.

Partek lift installations (incomplete)
Year of installation	Ski Area	Name	Type
1996	Jiminy Peak	Cricket	Triple
1996	Shawnee Mountain Ski Area	Tomahawk	Quad
1998	Mountain Creek	Sugar	Quad
1999	Wintergreen Ski Resort	Acorn	Quad
1999	Jack Frost Ski Resort	East Mountain	Double-Double
2001	Shawnee Mountain Ski Area	Lookout and Tecumseh	Double-Double
2002	Jack Frost Ski Resort	D	Double-Double
2002	Blue Mountain Resort	Valley School West	Triple
2003	Massanutten	Chair 6	Quad
2003	Horseshoe Resort	Highrider	Triple
2003	Pat's Peak	Turbulence	Triple
2003	Ski Bradford	Evvy's Double Nickel	Triple
2004	Ski Bromont	Mont Soleil	Triple
2004	Homewood Mountain Resort	Quail	Triple
2007	Gore Mountain	Village	Triple
2008	Hideout Ski Area	Main Line	Double
2009	Ski Big Bear	Thundercloud	Double-Double
2010	Gore Mountain	Hudson	Triple
2010	Mohawk Mountain Ski Area	Nutmeg	Triple
2011	Ski Sawmill	Triple	Triple
2012	Mountain Creek	Sojourn	Double
2013	Alpine Valley	Quad	Quad
2014	Shawnee Peak Ski Area	Rabbit Run	Triple
2015	National Winter Activity Center	Quad	Quad
2015	National Winter Activity Center	Triple	Triple
2016	North Carolina State Fair	State Fair Flyer	Triple
2017	Mount Peter	The Patriot	Quad
2018	West Mountain	Face	Quad
2019	West Mountain	Apex	Triple
2020	Trollhaugen	Chair 1	Quad
2022	Saddleback	Sandy	Quad
