= Windham Mountain Club =

Ski resort in New York, United States

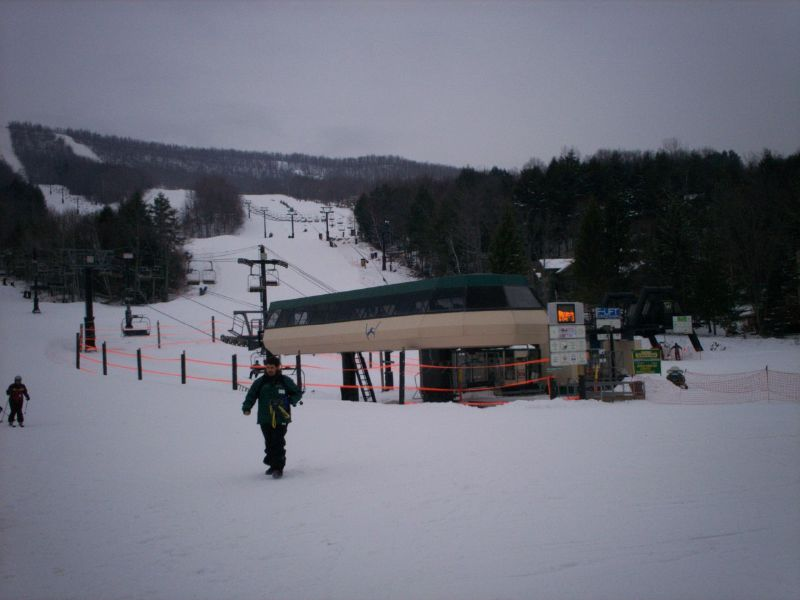
- Windham Mountain Club ski lift in 2008.

- Location within New York Location within the United States
- Location: Windham, New York, US
- Coordinates: 42.2987°N 74.2573°W
- Status: Operating
- Owner: Beall Investment Partners, Kemmons Wilson Hospitality Partners, North Castle Partners, Cloverhill Group, McGuffog and Starker families
- Vertical: 1,600 feet (490 m)
- Top elevation: 3,100 feet (940 m)
- Base elevation: 1,500 feet (460 m)
- Skiable area: 285 acres (115 ha)
- Trails: 54 total: 20% (12) novice; 48% (25) intermediate; 19% (10) advanced; 13% (7) expert
- Longest run: 2.37 miles (3.81 km)
- Lift system: 11 total (1 high speed six, 3 high speed quads, 1 fixed grip triple, 1 fixed grip double, 5 surface lifts)
- Lift capacity: 20,754 passengers/hour
- Terrain parks: Yes, 6
- Snowfall: avg 86 inches (2,200 mm) per year
- Snowmaking: Yes, 97%
- Website: Windham Mountain

Windham Mountain Club (formerly known as Windham Mountain) is a ski resort located in the town of Windham, New York (US), in the northern section of the Catskill Mountains, approximately 2.5 hours north of New York City. It has 54 trails and 11 lifts, including four high-speed detachable lifts.

The resort area includes two peaks. The higher of the two rises to 3,100 feet (940 m), a vertical difference of 1,600 feet (490 m) from the base.

== History ==
The New York state assembly considered opening a state-run ski resort on Windham (then called Cave Mountain) in the late 1950s. That project never advanced; instead, a group of private investors bought the land and opened Cave Mountain Ski Area in 1960. Three years later, ownership was transferred to Bob, James and Tom Sheridan, who opened a ski lodge on the property and introduced snowmaking that initially covered 12 acres.

In 1981, Irv Naylor, the owner and founder of Snow Time, Inc., purchased the ski area and renamed it Ski Windham. It was Naylor's third resort, as he already owned Ski Roundtop and Ski Liberty. In 1987, a major expansion to the mountain would occur on a second summit called East Peak, several new trails and a new lift were constructed. 1993 saw the installation of the mountain's first ever high-speed quad chairlift, serving the mountain's west peak. In 1997, lights were installed on several lower mountain trails as Windham became the only mountain in the Catskills to feature night skiing.

The ski area was renamed Windham Mountain in 2001. $5 million of major investments were made in 2006, adding three new trails and a new high-speed quad to replace the lift on East Peak. Windham also underwent major renovations in 2013, adding two new trails. As well as expanding the beginner area and parking lots.

In 2008, two New York state senators supported a bill that would establish a $150,000 blue-ribbon panel to look at the competition state-run recreational facilities posed to privately owned operations. David Donaldson, the Ulster County Legislature chairman, saw the bill as a direct attack on nearby state-owned Belleayre Ski Center in Ulster County, and connected the operators of Windham and Hunter Mountains to the effort to "cripple" Belleayre. The operators of the two privately run mountains had previously complained that as a mountain partially funded by taxpayers, Belleayre was taking business away from Windham and Hunter because it did not have to worry about making a profit. The bill passed in both the state Senate and Assembly, but was vetoed by Governor David Patterson in September 2008.

In April 2023, Beall Investment Partners and Kemmons Wilson Hospitality Partners took majority ownership of the resort, while North Castle Partners, Cloverhill Group, and the McGuffog and Starker families remained as existing partners.

In October 2023, it was announced that the mountain was re-branding as the Windham Mountain Club and will no longer honor the Ikon Pass, starting in the 2025 / 2026 season.

== Terrain ==
Windham features 54 trails on 285 skiable acres 97% of which are covered by snowmaking. The mountain peaks at 3,100 feet (940 m), with a vertical drop of 1,600 feet (490 m). The trails are situated on two separate mountain peaks, known as East Peak and West Peak. Of the trails 12 are designated beginner, 25 intermediate, 10 advanced, and 7 expert, the longest being 2.37 miles (3.81 km) long. The mountain also features six terrain parks.
