= Tenney Mountain =

Mountain in New Hampshire, United States

Coordinates: 43°44′16″N 71°47′01″W

Tenney Mountain is a mountain near Plymouth, New Hampshire. The summit of the mountain, at 2,350 feet (720 m) above sea level, is located in the town of Rumney, approximately .4 miles (0.6 km) west of the top of the Tenney Mountain Ski and Snowboarding Area.
