= Little Switzerland (Wisconsin) =

Ski area in Wisconsin, US

Coordinates: 43°20′16″N 88°16′44″W

Little Switzerland Ski Area
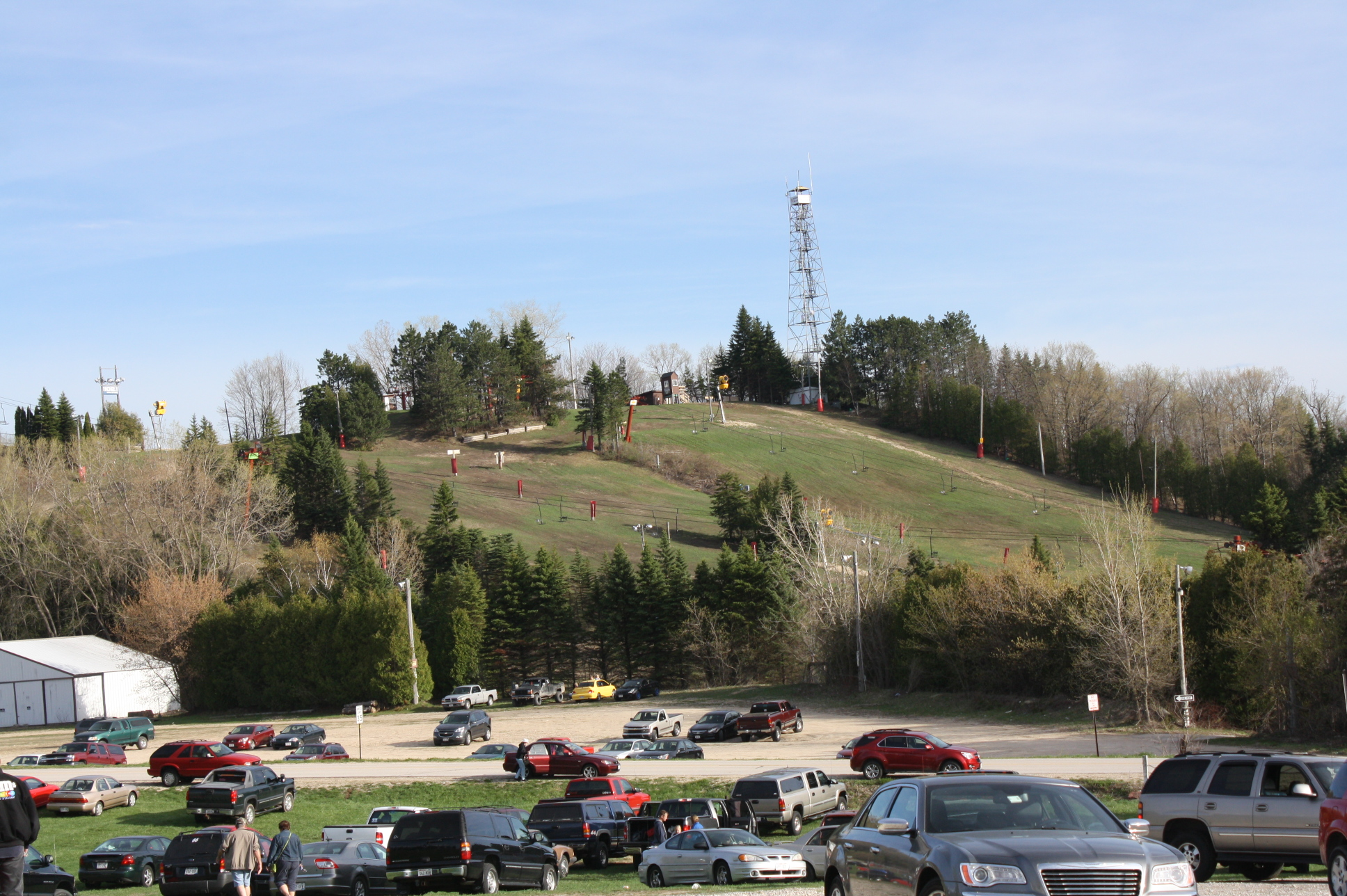
- Little Switzerland in spring
- Interactive map of Little Switzerland Ski Area
- Location: Slinger, Wisconsin
- Vertical: 200 ft (61 m)
- Top elevation: 1,269 ft (387 m)
- Base elevation: 1,069 ft (326 m)
- Skiable area: 50 acres (20 ha)
- Trails: 18
- Longest run: 1,800 ft (550 m)
- Lift system: 4 Doubles 2 Rope tows, 2 Handle tows
- Terrain parks: yes
- Snowfall: 45"
- Snowmaking: yes
- Night skiing: yes
- Website: littleswitz.com

Little Switzerland is a ski resort in Slinger, Wisconsin.

== History ==
Little Switzerland opened on December 7, 1941, with its last day of operation under its original owners on March 10, 2007. The area was completely remodeled in the summer of 2012 and reopened with new owners in the fall of 2012 as a year-round restaurant and winter ski area. Skiing and snowboarding resumed in the winter of 2012–2013.

== Description ==
The ski hill has 18 runs, 4 chairlifts, 2 surface lifts, and 3 rope tows covering both sides of the hill. Three terrain parks and a chalet are at the bottom of the hill, along with a full-service restaurant, bar, game room, snack bar and pro shop.

There are six runs, including a beginner terrain park, on the front side of the hill, and eleven runs on the back side.

Little Switzerland has a ski school that offers lessons of various group size, ability level, and duration for both skiing and snowboarding.

Little Switzerland previously opened lifts during warm months for downhill mountain biking. They had green to black trails along with rentals. However, in the spring of 2023 it was announced that the bike park would not reopen due to the parks insurance provider dropping coverage.

They also hosted Gravityfest each year.

== Ski School ==
Lessons are offered for Ski and Snowboarders of all ages and ability and are offered throughout the duration of the season.

The ski school offers both small group and private lessons for people looking to get a more personalized lesson experience. These private lessons are offered throughout the season during weeknights and weekends.

Weeknight lessons are offered to schools in the area for large groups of elementary and middle school children who want to learn to ski or snowboard. These weeknight lessons are once a week for a month with groups coming as far as northern Illinois to participate.

Two sessions of a four week group program are offered in both January and February, this program is for skiers 4-12 and snowboarders 6-12 is 2 hours a week for four weeks on the weekend. These small group lessons are usually with the same instructors for the whole program, this allows for the instructor to fine tune the lesson program for the groups needs. There is also an hour long option for 3-4 year old skiers.

== See also ==
- List of ski areas and resorts in the United States
