= Tyrol Basin =

Ski resort in Wisconsin, United States

- Interactive map of Tyrol Basin
- Location: Town of Vermont, Wisconsin
- Nearest city: Mount Horeb, Wisconsin
- Coordinates: 43.04°N 89.77°W
- Vertical: 300 ft (91 m)
- Top elevation: 1,130 ft (340 m)
- Base elevation: 830 ft (250 m)
- Skiable area: 32 acres (130,000 m^{2})
- Trails: 22
- Lift system: 3 chairs, 1 rope, 1 magic carpet, 1 handle tow
- Lift capacity: 3 skiers/chair
- Terrain parks: 5
- Snowmaking: Yes
- Night skiing: Yes
- Website: tyrolbasin.com

Tyrol Basin is a ski and snowboard area located in the town of Vermont, Wisconsin, near Mount Horeb, Wisconsin. It has runs at beginner, intermediate, advanced and expert level. Tyrol Basin has 22 runs, and 300–foot vertical, of average size for Midwest ski resorts. The ski area attracts many skiers and snowboarders from nearby Madison, Wisconsin.

== Snow tubing ==
In 2019, Tyrol Basin added snow tubing as well as a new bar and concession building.

== See also ==
- List of ski areas and resorts in the United States
