= Cascade Mountain (ski area) =

Ski area in Wisconsin, United States

- Interactive map of Cascade Mountain
- Location: Portage, Wisconsin
- Coordinates: 43°30′14.14″N 89°31′4.86″W
- Status: Operating
- Vertical: 450 ft (140 m)
- Top elevation: 1,270 ft (390 m)
- Base elevation: 820 ft (250 m)
- Skiable area: 175 acres (71 ha)
- Trails: 48
- Longest run: 5,300 ft (1,600 m)
- Lift system: 10 lifts: 2 Detachable quad chairlift, 4 quad chairs, 2 double chairs, and two surface lifts.
- Terrain parks: Yes, 4
- Snowmaking: Yes
- Night skiing: Yes
- Website: http://www.cascademountain.com/

Cascade Mountain is located in Portage, Wisconsin. It has 48 trails, 3 terrain parks, and an 800-foot-long chute for snow tubing.

== Location ==
Cascade Mountain is located on Interstate 90/94 between Madison, Wisconsin and Wisconsin Dells, Wisconsin in Columbia County, Wisconsin. It is 30 minutes northwest of Madison and 15 to 20 minutes south of Wisconsin Dells.

== Trails ==
Cascade Mountain offers 48 trails varying from beginner, intermediate, to advanced. Open to both skiers and snowboarders the runs break down to 38% beginner runs, 24% intermediate runs, and 38% advanced runs. "The longest trail at Cascade Mountain is called "Far Out", a beginner cruiser trail that takes you past old growth forests, waterfalls, rock formations and more scenic terrain. It is 5,300 feet long, or just over a mile."

== See also ==
- List of ski areas and resorts in the United States
