= Bear Pond Mountains =

Subrange of the Appalachian Mountains

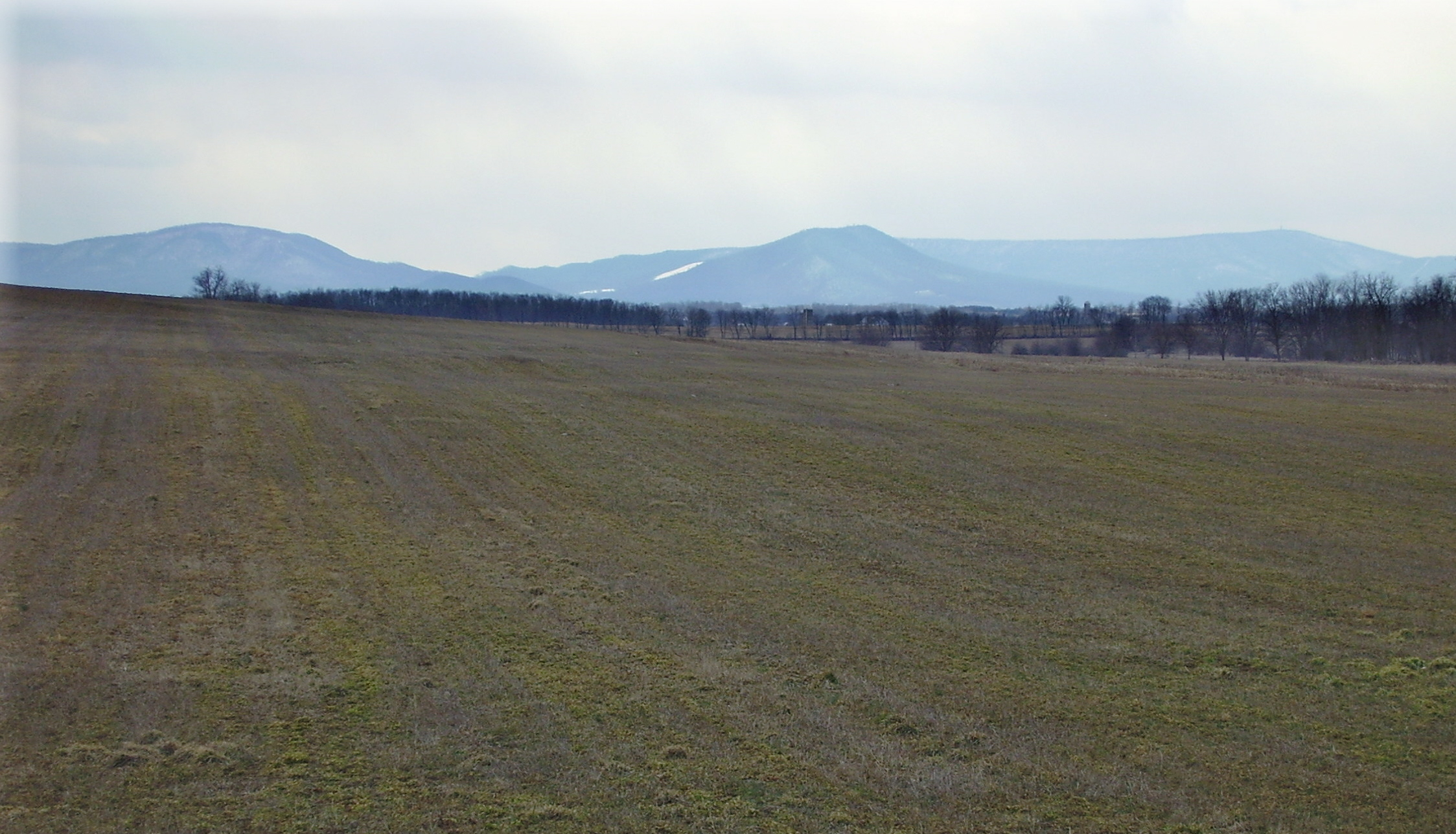
- From left to right: Kasies Knob, Two Top and Cross Mountain.

Highest point
- Peak: Cross Mountain
- Elevation: 2,062 ft (628 m)

Geography
- Country: United States
- State(s): Pennsylvania, Maryland,
- Range coordinates: 39°43′02″N 77°58′30″W
- Biome: Eastern Temperate Forests

Geology
- Orogeny: Alleghenian
- Rock age: Ordovician

The Bear Pond Mountains are a subrange in the Appalachian Mountains, that straddle Pennsylvania and Maryland in the United States. These mountains are a part of the Ridge and Valley Appalachians and reach their highest point at Cross Mountain (Pennsylvania) 2,062 feet (628 m). A unique geologic feature known as the "Punchbowl" occurs in this range. This feature was created by the weathered shales of the Ordovician age in the center of a south-plunging anticline, having been eroded to expose a large amphitheater-like feature (punchbowl). Cross and Hearthstone Mountain are made of hard resistant quartzite of the Tuscarora Formation of the Silurian age, which form the walls of the bowl.

Whitetail Ski Resort is also located in this range on Two Top Mountain.

The chief summits of the Bear Pond Mountains are the following:

- Cross Mountain (Pennsylvania) 2,062 feet (628 m)
- Hearthstone Mountain 2,021 feet (616 m)
- Two Top Mountain 1,780 feet (543 m)
- Mount Mollica 1,776 feet (541 m)
- Mount Fallon 1,764 feet (537 m)
- Kasie's Knob 1,760 feet (536 m)
- Fairview Mountain 1,690 feet (515 m)
- Gillian's Knob 1,575 feet (480 m)
- Bullskin Mountain 1,551 feet (473 m)
- Rickard Mountain 1,550 feet (472 m)
- Powell Mountain 1,548 feet (472 m)
- Sword Mountain 1,500 feet (457 m)
- Abe Mills Mountain 1,376 feet (419 m)
- Johnson Mountain 1,140 feet (347 m)

== See also ==
- List of subranges of the Appalachian Mountains
