= Cross Mountain (Pennsylvania) =

Mountain in Pennsylvania, United States

Coordinates: 39.72829°N 77.99176°W

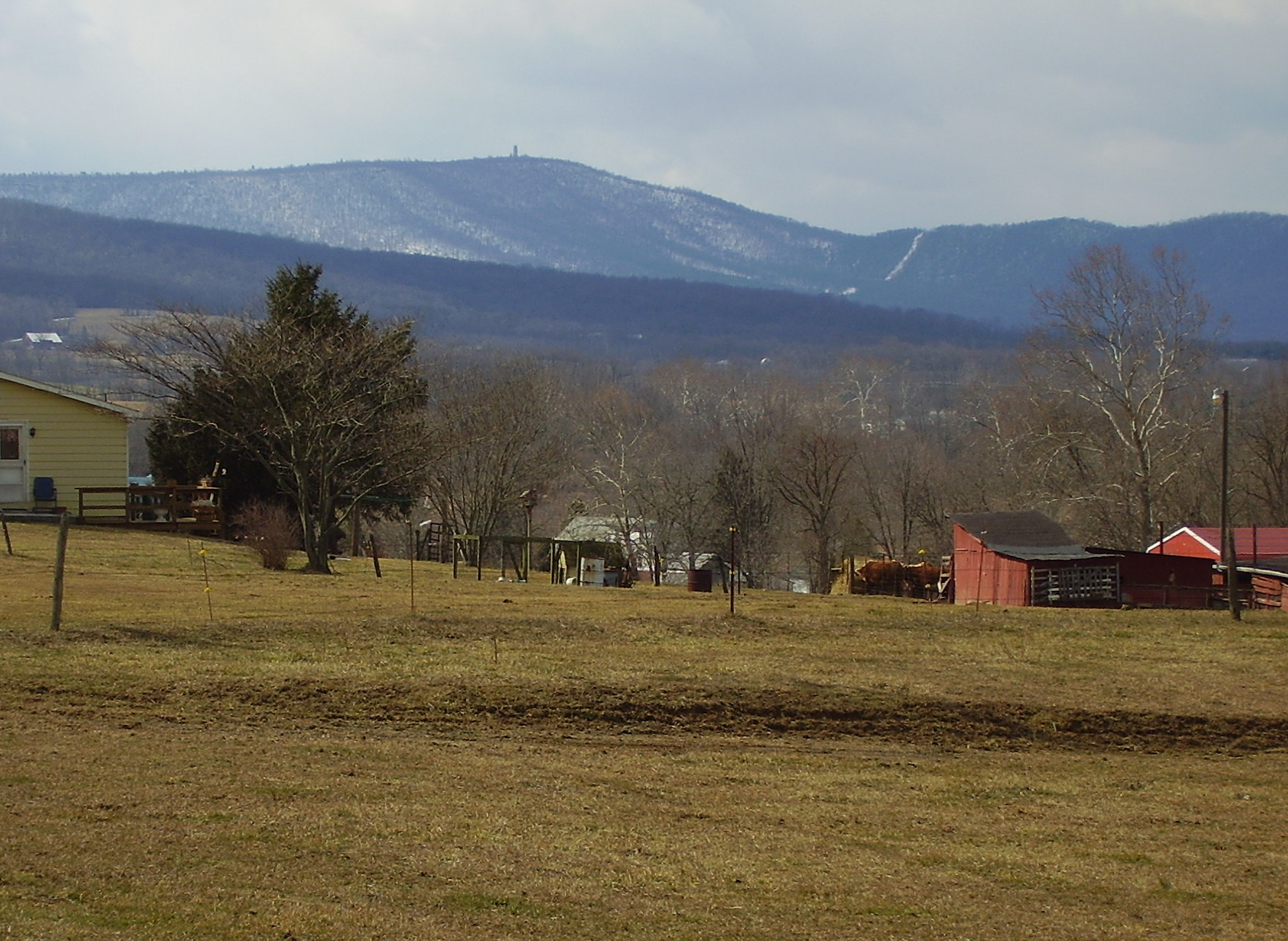
- Cross Mountain (note the tower on the summit)

Highest point
- Elevation: 2,062 ft (628 m)

Geography
- Location: Franklin County, Pennsylvania, U.S.
- Parent range: Appalachian Mountains
- Topo map(s): USGS Clear Spring (MD, PA) Quadrangle

Cross Mountain is the highest peak in the Bear Pond Mountains, a sub range of the Appalachian Mountains in the United States. This grouping of mountains straddle the Maryland and Pennsylvania border.

Cross Mountain and Hearthstone Mountain 2,021 feet (616 m) which is on the Maryland side, form a unique geologic formation known as the "Punchbowl". This feature was created by the weathered shales of the Ordovician age in the center of a south-plunging anticline, having been eroded to expose a large amphitheater like feature (punchbowl). Cross and Hearthstone Mountain are made of hard resistant quartzite of the Tuscarora Formation of the Silurian age.

Cross Mountain is also the site of a deactivated microwave relay station, that was used during the Cold War. The unit was encased in a 103 ft. tower, and known as the "Cannonball" site 2. The site was closed in 1977. Access to the summit is still restricted.
