= New Mexico State Road 475 =

State highway in New Mexico, United States

State Road 475
- NM 475 highlighted in red

Route information
- Maintained by NMDOT
- Length: 16.907 mi (27.209 km)

Major junctions
- West end: US 84 / US 285 in Santa Fe
- East end: End of route at Santa Fe Ski Basin

Location
- Country: United States
- State: New Mexico
- Counties: Santa Fe

Highway system
- New Mexico State Highway System; Interstate; US; State; Scenic
← NM 474	→ NM 476

State Road 475 (NM 475) is a 16.907-mile-long (27.209 km) state highway in the US state of New Mexico. NM 475's western terminus is at the intersection of U.S. Route 84 (US 84) and US 285 in Santa Fe, and the eastern terminus is a dead end at Santa Fe Ski Basin.

== Major intersections ==
The entire route is in Santa Fe County.

Location	mi	km	Destinations	Notes
Santa Fe	0.000	0.000	US 84 / US 285	Western terminus
	16.907	27.209	End of route at Santa Fe Ski Basin	Eastern terminus
1.000 mi = 1.609 km; 1.000 km = 0.621 mi

== Gallery ==
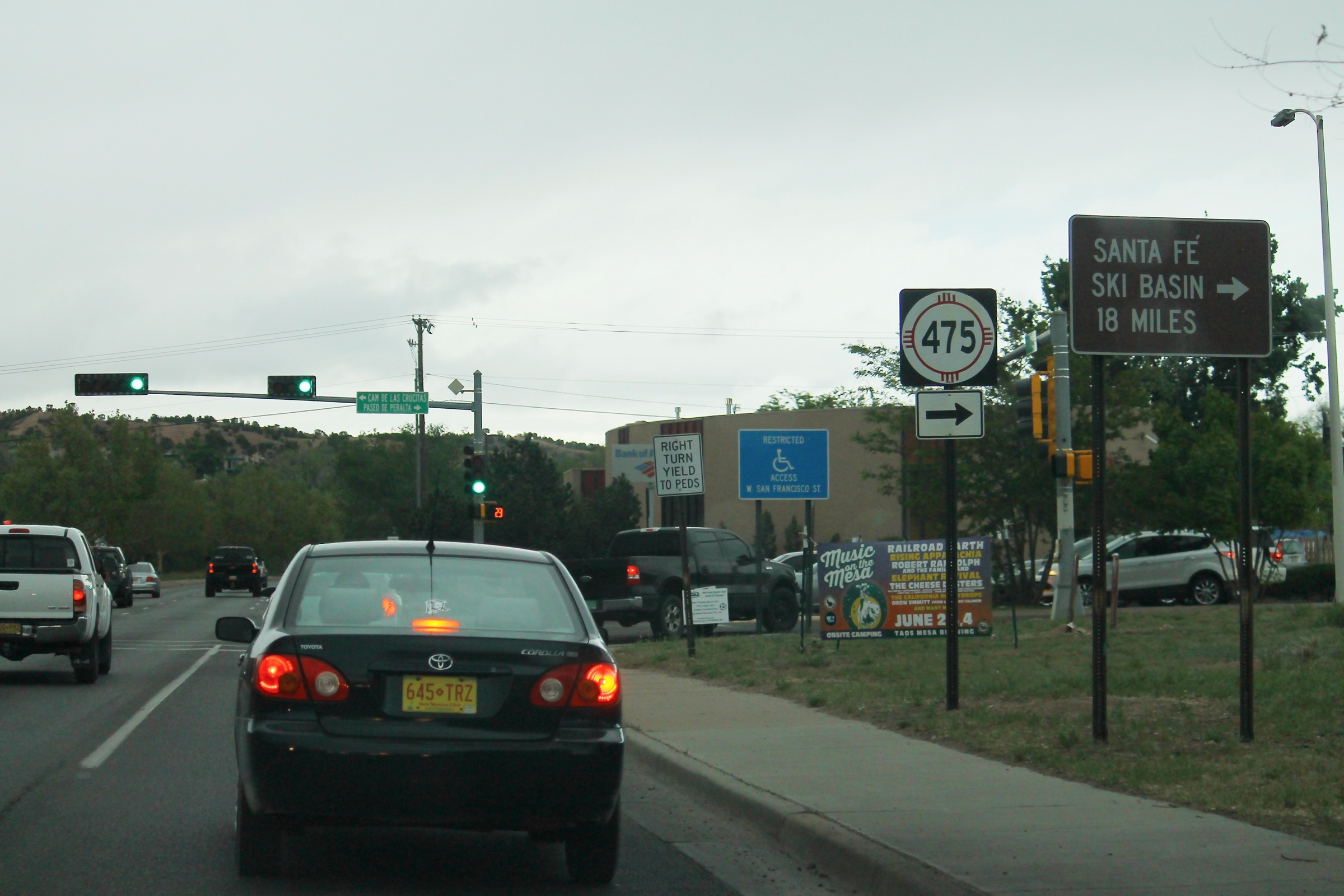

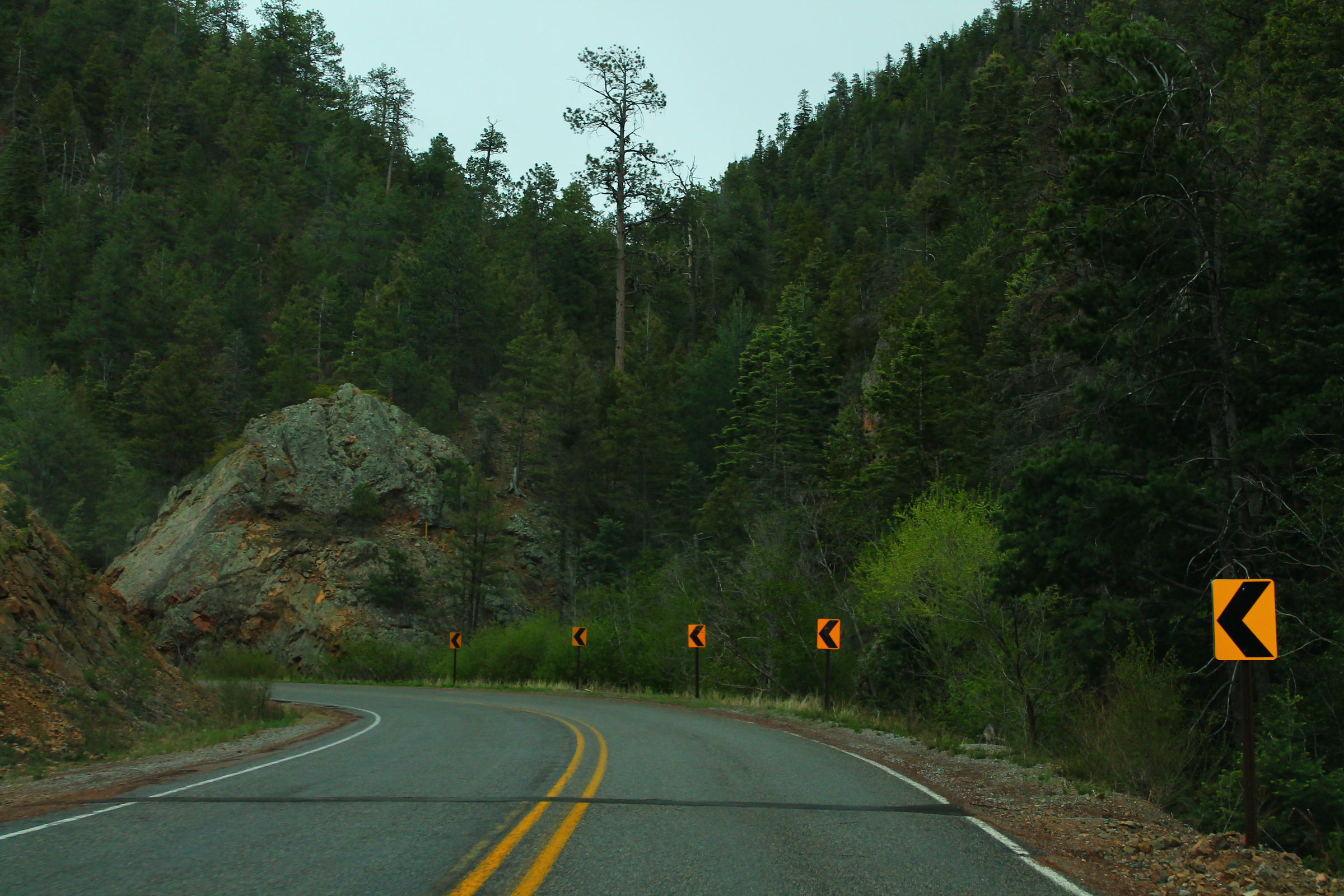

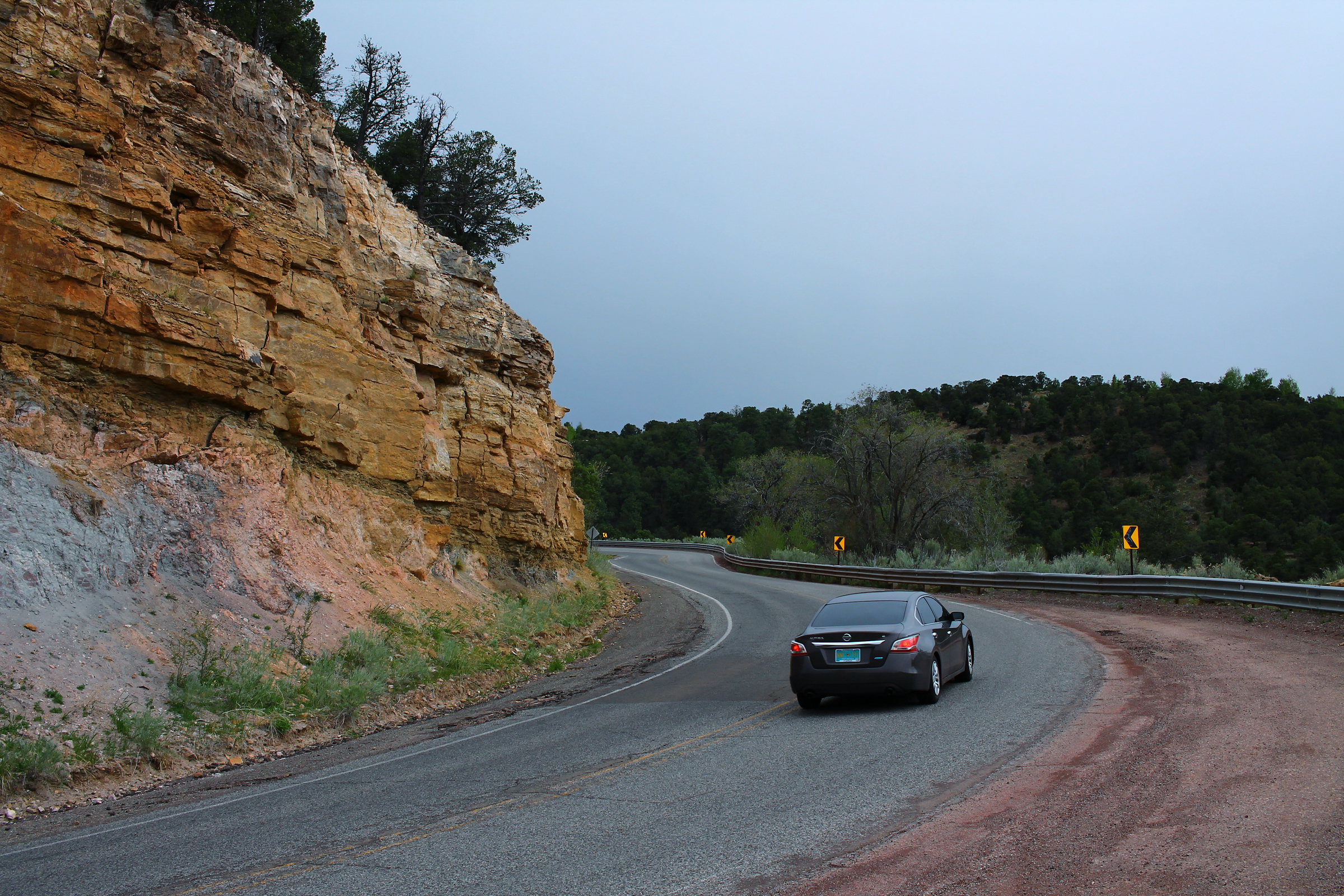

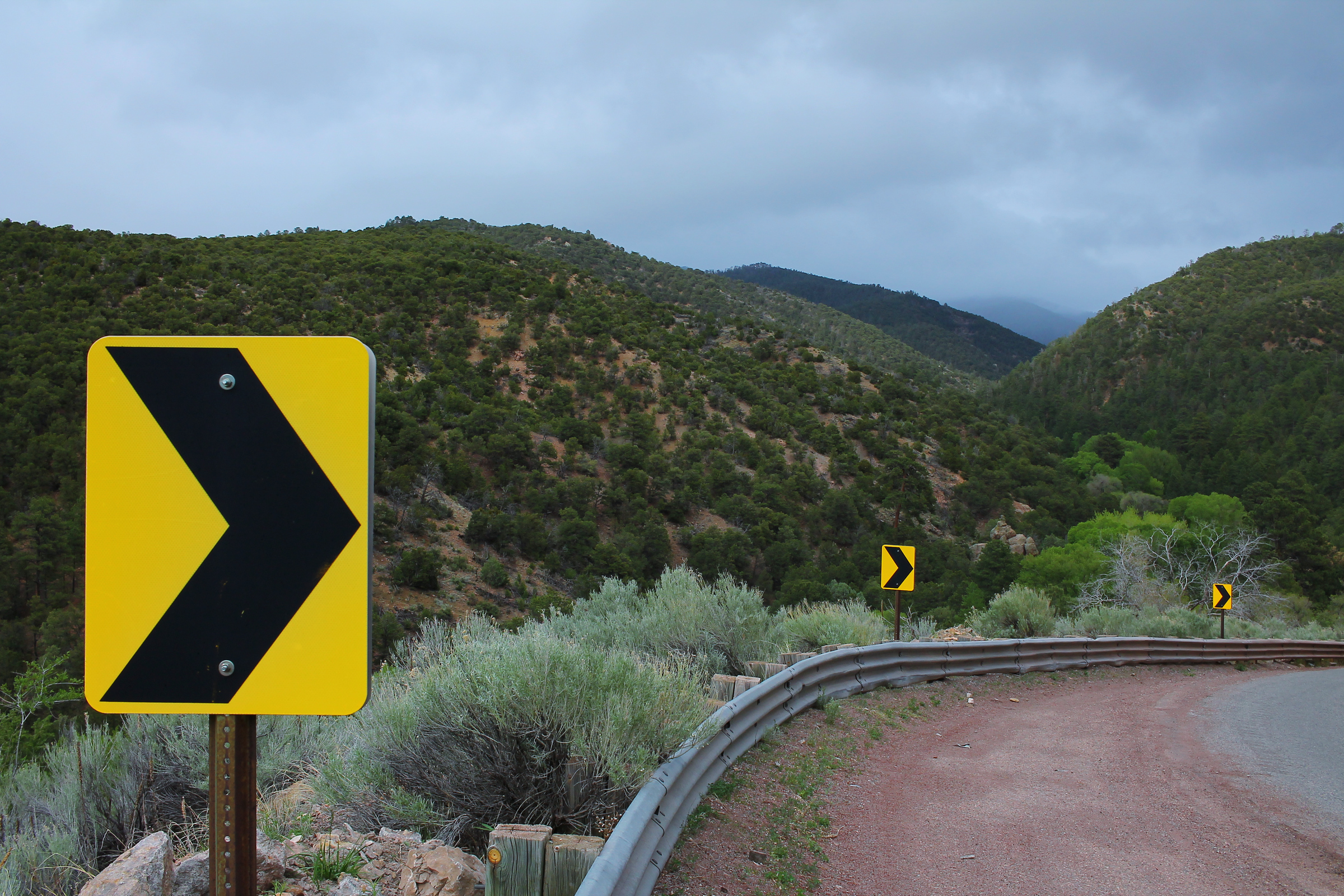
