= Jiminy Peak (ski area) =

Ski area in Hancock, Massachusetts

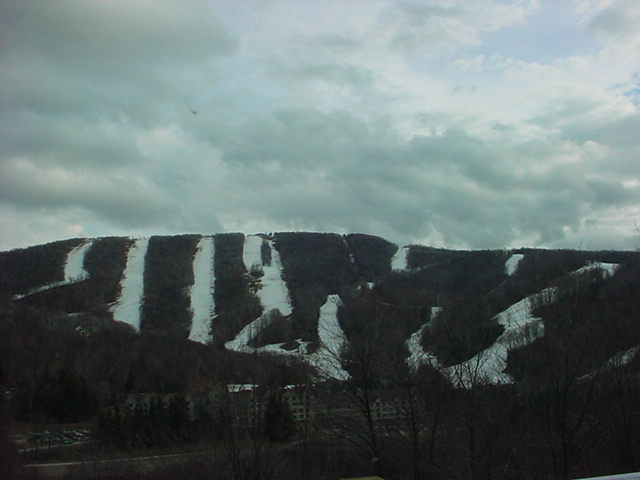
- Jiminy Peak in 2002

- Location in Massachusetts Jiminy Peak (the United States)
- Location: Hancock, Massachusetts, United States
- Nearest city: Pittsfield
- Coordinates: 42°33′03″N 73°17′27″W
- Vertical: 1,150 ft (351 m)
- Top elevation: 2,375 ft (724 m)
- Base elevation: 1,245 ft (379 m)
- Skiable area: 170 acres (0.69 km^{2})
- Trails: 45
- Longest run: 2 mi (3.2 km)
- Lift system: 7 chairs, 2 surface lift
- Terrain parks: 3
- Snowfall: 108 in (270 cm)
- Website: jiminypeak.com

Jiminy Peak is a mid-sized alpine ski resort located in Hancock, Massachusetts. It lies in the Taconic Mountains, near the state's far western edge, and northwest of nearby Pittsfield. The summit of Jiminy Peak, which includes the Hendricks Summit Lodge, is located in Lanesborough.

The mountain is owned by Sculptor Capital Management but the operating company is owned and managed by Brian Fairbank, the longtime former owner of the Resort. During the winter Jiminy Peak offers skiing, snowboarding, outdoor pools, and various restaurants. There are 45 trails and nine lifts, including a six-person, high speed chairlift. In the summer additional activities are offered at Mountain Adventure Park, such as an alpine super slide, mountain coaster, hiking, and mountain biking. The Aerial Adventure Park is a challenge course up in the trees. Five levels provide both physical and mental challenges for all levels. Courses range from 15–50 feet (5–15 m) in the air. Jiminy Peak has installed the second mountain coaster in the country (the first on the East Coast) and is the home of the nation's first Alpine Super Slide (June 1977).

In August 2007, Jiminy became the first private U.S. business to invest in its own megawatt class wind turbine. The turbine generates approximately 35% of the annual energy used at the resort. The winds blow strongest in the winters, which is when the resort uses the most energy, for lifts and snowmaking. This is the largest commitment in Jiminy Peak's ongoing environmental sustainability efforts. In February 2012, the Resort installed a CoGeneration Unit in the Country Inn to provide both heat and hot water to the hotel.

In 1960 Jiminy Peak had two T-bar lifts, three rope tows, and lift fees were US$4 per day.

In the past decade, the mountain has been increasingly developed for real estate, as the demand for housing and activities has also increased. The mountain has 15,000 square feet (1,400 m^{2}) of meeting space for meetings, conferences, weddings, parties, and other events.

== Lift System ==
Jiminy Peak has 7 chairlifts, and 2 Magic Carpets.

=== Main Lifts ===
Name	Type	Make	Built	Length (feet)	Vertical (feet)
Berkshire Express	High Speed Six Pack	Garaventa CTEC	2000	3,922	1,113
Q1/Whitetail Quad	Quad	Garaventa CTEC	1992	2,855	
Q3/Widow's White Quad	Quad	Garaventa CTEC	1998	3,005	902
Summit Triple	Triple	Riblet	1983	4,230	1,148
Novice Chair	Triple	Riblet	2000	1148	191
Grand Slam Chair	Double	Riblet	1969	2,771	591
Cricket Triple Chair	Triple	Partek	1996	650	56

=== Past lifts ===
Name	Type	Make	Years active	Length (feet)	Vertical (feet)	Notes
J-Bar	J-Bar	Borvig	1987-1996	329	28	Replaced by Cricket Triple Chair
Upper T-Bar	T-Bar	Constam	1948-1978	2,300		
Lower T-Bar	T-Bar	Hall	1959-1978		900	
Summit Double	Fixed Double	Mṻeller	1964-1983	1,148	191	Replaced by Summit Triple, sold to Highmount, NY
Novice Double	Fixed Double	Riblet	1978-2000	3,820	1,098	Modified into triple, shares base terminal with Berkshire Express
Exhibition Double	Fixed Double	Riblet	1978-2000			Replaced by Berkshire Express

== Summer attractions ==
- Aerial Adventure Park
- Mountain Coaster
- Alpine Super Slide
- Soaring Eagle
- Giant Swing
- Chairlift Rides
- Rock Climbing Wall
- Euro Bungy Trampoline
- Bounce Houses
- Kid Climb
- Hiking

== Labor controversies ==
In 2018, the U.S. Department of Labor's Wage and Hour Division found that Jiminy Park had violated The Fair Labor Standards Act by employing 44 minors, age 14 and 15, in shifts that exceeded the maximum amounted hours for employing minors. The Fairbank group took corrective measured and was ordered to pay a $21,582 penalty.

On January 18, 2019 Jiminy Resorts was the center of a social media controversy regarding a printed employee notice. The printed notice, which was pinned to a cork board, was written to inform employees of the John Harvard’s Brewery and Ale House that the winter storm were not "an excuse to miss work". In addition the letter stated that in the event that a "state of emergency is declared" that the resort was "exempt." The letter concludes by stating that if employees choose to stay overnight at the resort "NO accommodations available. Not even a pillow or blanket." The notice, which was allegedly taken by an employee, was posted online and shared 2,000 times by January 20.
