= Whitetail Ski Resort =

Ski area in Pennsylvania, United States

- Interactive map of Whitetail Ski Resort
- Location: Montgomery Township, Franklin County, Pennsylvania, United States
- Coordinates: 39°44′30″N 77°55′58″W
- Owner: Vail Resorts
- Vertical: 935 feet (285 m)
- Top elevation: 1,800 feet (550 m)
- Base elevation: 865 feet (264 m)
- Skiable area: 120 acres (0.49 km^{2})
- Trails: 22 total 27% beginner 50% intermediate 18% advanced 5% terrain park
- Longest run: "Limelight" ~ 4,900 feet (1494 m)
- Lift system: 8 total (1 high-speed quad chairs, 3 quad lifts, 1 double lift, 2 surface)
- Lift capacity: 12,200 skiers/hour
- Terrain parks: 1
- Snowmaking: Yes, 100% coverage
- Night skiing: Yes, 95% coverage
- Website: http://www.skiwhitetail.com

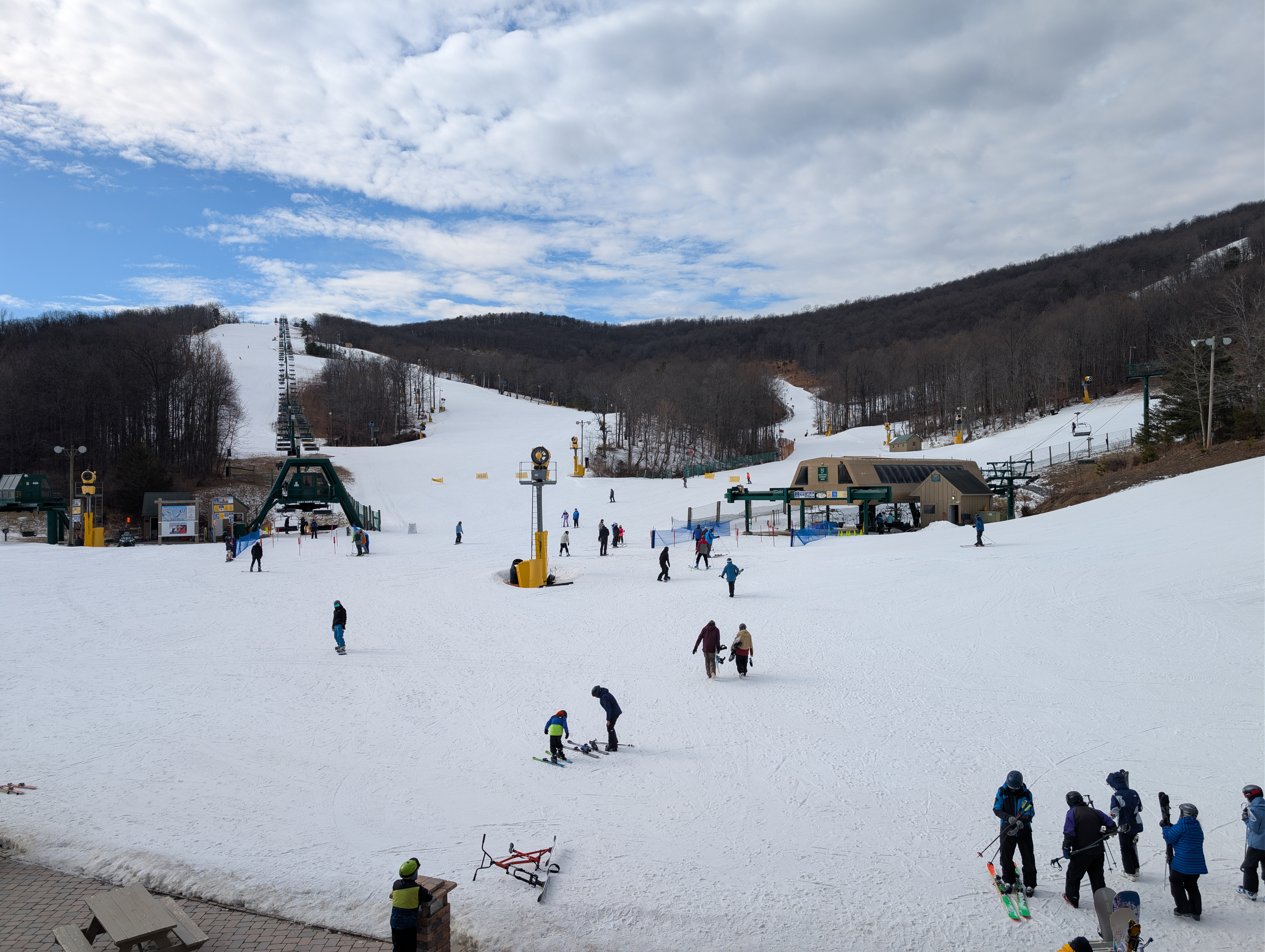
Base of Whitetail Ski Resort.

Whitetail Mountain Resort is a four-season resort located on Two Top Mountain, a mountain in the Bear Pond Mountains of Pennsylvania.

Whitetail is located between Mercersburg, Pennsylvania and Clear Spring, Maryland and serves the Baltimore-Washington Metropolitan Area. Located 89 miles (143 km) from Washington, D.C., and 92 miles (148 km) from Baltimore, Maryland, Whitetail is the second-closest ski resort to Washington and the third-closest to Baltimore (behind sister resorts Liberty Mountain and Ski Roundtop). The resort operates a snow tubing park as well. During the spring and summer, Whitetail offers fly fishing and a par 72 golf course.

== History ==
The resort opened for skiing in 1991, and was acquired a few years later by Snow Time, Inc., the company which also managed Liberty Mountain Resort and Ski Roundtop. All three resorts (Whitetail, Liberty and Roundtop) were then acquired by Peak Resorts in 2018. Peak Resorts was then acquired by Vail Resorts in 2019.

== The Mountain ==
Whitetail Resort's trail system was specifically designed to separate skiers of different skiing abilities. Separate first time, easier, intermediate and most difficult areas are lined up in sequence across the mountain, each fed by a different lift system, with trails connecting each area to its neighbors. Whitetail's trails are a series of straight parallels noted for the steady, sustained pitch of their vertical drop. The resort's design was noted by Snow Country Magazine, which gave its 1992 Best Overall Resort Design Award to Whitetail, and by Skiing Magazine, which recognized the resort for environmental excellence in area design.

== Trails ==
Whitetail possesses slopes with varying levels of difficulty. The trail names are as follows:

Easier Trails: Almost Home, Launching Pad, Northern Lights, Sidewinder, Snowpark, Velvet

More Difficult Trails: Upper Angel Drop, Lower Angel Drop, Bob Small's Traverse, Drop Out, Fallmount, Fanciful, Home Run, Limelight, Ridge Runner, Snow Dancer, Stalker

Most Difficult Trails: Exhibition, Farside, Drop in

Extremely Difficult Trails: Bold Decision

Terrain Parks: Jib Junction

== Ski season ==
Whitetail Resort usually has a short to medium ski season. This is because of its position in the transition of a Humid Subtropical climate, and a Temperate climate. The number of days in the season ranges from 80 to 100 days. Whitetail usually gets crowded on weekends and holidays, while weekdays are usually less busy. Snow Conditions are good up until early March, where the south facing aspect of the mountain leads to cyclic melting and refreezing.
