= Tenney Mountain Ski Resort =

American ski area in New Hampshire

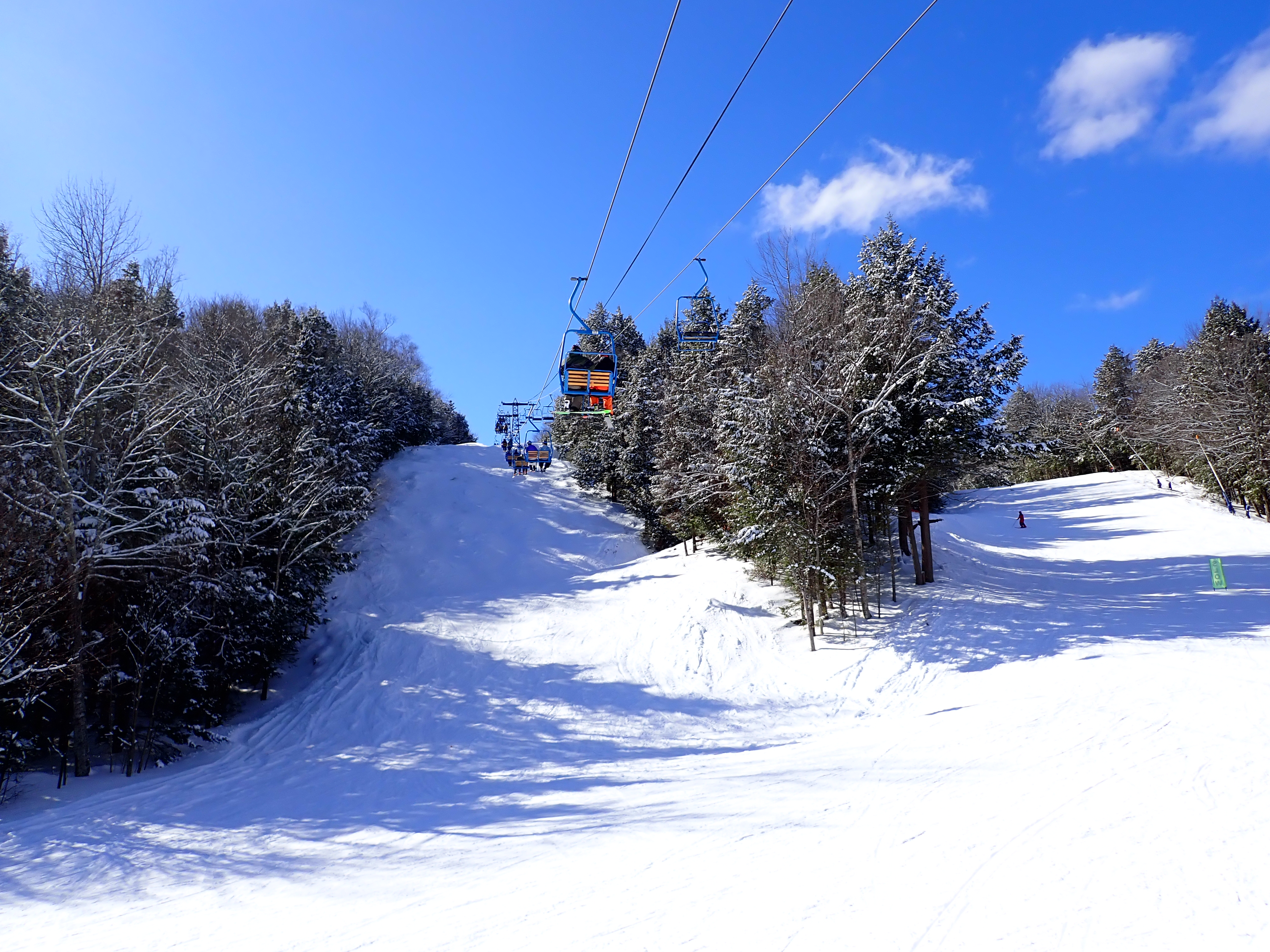
- Interactive map of Tenney Mountain Ski Resort
- Location: Plymouth / Groton, Grafton County, New Hampshire
- Mountain: Tenney Mountain
- Nearest city: Plymouth, New Hampshire
- Coordinates: 43°44′16″N 71°47′01″W
- Status: Operating (seasonally)
- Owner: North Country Development Group
- Vertical: 1,400 ft (430 m)
- Top elevation: 2,149 ft (655 m)
- Base elevation: 749 ft (228 m)
- Skiable area: 110 acres (45 ha)
- Trails: 45; 13% Novice; 56% Intermediate; 31% Advanced
- Lift system: 1 triple, 1 double, 1 platter/tubing lift
- Terrain parks: Yes
- Snowmaking: Yes, 85% of terrain
- Website: www.skiTENNEY.com

Tenney Mountain Ski Resort is a ski area in Plymouth, New Hampshire, located on Tenney Mountain. It closed in 2010 after operating for 45 years, but reopened for ski operations in March 2018. It closed due to the COVID-19 pandemic in March 2020 and did not operate during the 2020–21 or 2021–22 seasons, while allowing backcountry access. It reopened in February 2023.

== History ==
The first trails at the mountain were cut in 1959, and until 1964 operated only T-bar lifts. In 1964, the area constructed a new Stadeli double chair, which made Tenney Mountain the largest ski area in the region. This lift was dubbed the "Hornet Double," and began operation on January 10, 1965, along with five new trails that it serviced. In 1970, a second double chair was constructed, built by Heron-Poma. This lift was replaced in 1987 by a Borvig triple chair, called the "Eclipse." This was planned to be followed by a second triple, extending from mid-mountain to a higher summit than the Hornet Double served. Due to a weak real estate market during this time, however, the lift was never constructed, although trails were cut. Tenney was purchased shortly after by Bill Krikorian, who renamed the area "Lookout". It was later closed for part of the 1990s, and subsequently reopened under the name of Tenney Mountain.

In 2002, the ski area was purchased once again; the new owners announced a $1 million investment in a new snowmaking system, called SnowMagic. The system was designed to enable snowmaking operations to continue year-round, but revenue didn't cover the cost and in 2004 year-round snowmaking operations were shut down.

The area did not open for the 2010/2011 ski season due to financial issues including $200,000 in unpaid taxes. On December 15, 2010, Tenney was sold to Iroquois Capital, an investment firm from New York City. The purchasing price was $500,000, and Iroquois also bought 425 acres (172 ha) of land near the ski area.

=== Tenney Mountain Development Group ===
On October 17, 2014, a company named Tenney Mountain Development Group (TMDG), headed by Michael L. Bouchard, was registered in Windham, New Hampshire. Two months later, TMDG purchased the area for 1.25 million dollars. In February 2015 it was reported that the construction company working with TMDG had "presented plans" to the town of Plymouth, and that both of the chairlifts had been run recently. In March, TMDG launched a Facebook page, with hints on what was planned for the resort. Later posts on their Facebook page showed that the reopening of Tenney Mountain was moving forward, including chairlift inspections and snow surveys.

=== Attempted 2015–16 season reopening ===
In early 2015, TMDG started clearing five years of brush growth on the mountain's trails. The lodge was renovated, including a new roof, kitchen and bathrooms. Daily posts outlined the progress at the resort, such as the retrofitting of chairlifts and snowmaking system repairs. Three grooming machines were purchased from Piston Bully, as well as HKD snowmaking equipment. Amenities for the first season were expected to be limited, with no rentals or season passes and minimal trail lighting. They originally planned to open on December 15, 2015, but were unable due to poor winter conditions.

When the resort shut down in 2009, the owners simply walked away. They left the snowmaking system full of water, causing the pipes to shatter and split during the following winters. Food was left to rot in the kitchen, and roads on the mountain were not maintained, allowing for erosion to wash away access roads. Also, most of the copper piping in the pump house was ripped out and stolen at some point during the five-year closure period. On the evening of January 5, 2016, Tenney Mountain started making snow for the first time in six years, using four SMI fan guns purchased by Sharon Atwood from a ski area in New York. Installation of the HKD snowmaking equipment purchased in the summer of 2015 was postponed until after the 2015–16 season.

=== 2016–present ===
During the numerous warm spells during the late winter, and into the early summer, Tenney Mountain worked on repairing and upgrading the Hornet double chairlift, hoping to have it inspected in June. On June 13, 2016, the Hornet was inspected and tested by the state and passed. Throughout the summer and into the fall, the resort worked to locate and repair bursts and breaks in the snowmaking loops caused by freezing water.

The mountain never opened for lift-served operations. They did encourage people to hike up the mountain to ski down if they wanted to do so. The mountain continued to work on clearing and maintenance through the summer and fall of 2016.

After telling the Plymouth Planning Board that it planned a series of developments around a refurbished mountain, the mountain opened for snow-tubing on February 17, 2017. Tenney Mountain officially re-opened for lift-served skiing and riding on March 8, 2018.

In 2022, the mountain was purchased by the North Country Development Group, LLC. Lift-operated skiing resumed in February 2023. In October 2023, it was reported that the area's 2023–24 season would begin on December 23.

== Mountain statistics ==
Tenney Mountain had 45 trails, spread over 110 acres (45 ha). The terrain is served by three lifts: a triple chair, a double chair and a Pomalift.

The ski area has a top elevation of 2,149 feet (655 m) and a base elevation of 749 feet (228 m), for a vertical drop of 1,400 feet (430 m).
