= Coppervale Ski Area =

Ski area in California, United States

- Interactive map of Coppervale Ski Area
- Location: Coppervale Ski Area
- Nearest city: Susanville
- Coordinates: 40.345°N 120.904°W
- Vertical: 577 ft (176 m)
- Top elevation: 5,827 ft (1,776 m)
- Base elevation: 5,250 m (17,220 ft)
- Trails: 8
- Lift system: 2 surface lifts

Coppervale Ski Area is a small ski area in Lassen County, California, 18 miles from Susanville. Established in the late 1930s, the area has been owned and operated by Lassen Community College since the 1960s.
