= Dresser, Wisconsin =

- Village
- Location of Dresser in Polk County, Wisconsin.
- Coordinates: 45°21′26″N 92°38′4″W
- Country: United States
- State: Wisconsin
- County: Polk

Area
  - Total: 1.90 sq mi (4.92 km^{2})
  - Land: 1.90 sq mi (4.91 km^{2})
  - Water: 0.0039 sq mi (0.01 km^{2})
- Elevation: 928 ft (283 m)

Population (2020)
  - Total: 935
  - Density: 493/sq mi (190/km^{2})
- Time zone: UTC-6 (Central (CST))
  - Summer (DST): UTC-5 (CDT)
- ZIP: 54009
- Area codes: 715 & 534
- FIPS code: 55-20850
- GNIS feature ID: 1564104
- Website: www.villageofdresser.com

Dresser is a village in Polk County, Wisconsin, United States. The population was 935 at the 2020 census. It is along Wisconsin Highway 35.

== History ==
The community has the name of Samuel B. Dresser, an early settler.

== Geography ==
Dresser is located at 45°21′26″N 92°38′4″W (45.357187, -92.634513).

According to the United States Census Bureau, the village has a total area of 1.94 square miles (5.02 km^{2}), all land.

== Demographics ==
Historical population
Census	Pop.	Note	%±
1930	285		—
1940	294		3.2%
1950	365		24.1%
1960	498		36.4%
1970	533		7.0%
1980	670		25.7%
1990	614		−8.4%
2000	732		19.2%
2010	895		22.3%
2020	935		4.5%
U.S. Decennial Census

=== 2010 census ===
As of the census of 2010, there were 895 people, 361 households, and 231 families living in the village. The population density was 461.3 inhabitants per square mile (178.1/km^{2}). There were 382 housing units at an average density of 196.9 per square mile (76.0/km^{2}). The racial makeup of the village was 98.1% White, 0.2% African American, 0.4% Asian, 0.1% Pacific Islander, 0.7% from other races, and 0.4% from two or more races. Hispanic or Latino of any race were 1.9% of the population.

There were 361 households, of which 34.6% had children under the age of 18 living with them, 47.6% were married couples living together, 10.2% had a female householder with no husband present, 6.1% had a male householder with no wife present, and 36.0% were non-families. 27.1% of all households were made up of individuals, and 10.2% had someone living alone who was 65 years of age or older. The average household size was 2.48 and the average family size was 3.00.

The median age in the village was 34.6 years. 27.5% of residents were under the age of 18; 5.5% were between the ages of 18 and 24; 32.5% were from 25 to 44; 22.1% were from 45 to 64; and 12.5% were 65 years of age or older. The gender makeup of the village was 48.4% male and 51.6% female.

=== 2000 census ===
As of the census of 2000, there were 732 people, 302 households, and 206 families living in the village. The population density was 384.6 people per square mile (148.8/km^{2}). There were 312 housing units at an average density of 163.9 per square mile (63.4/km^{2}). The racial makeup of the village was 98.22% White, 0.14% African American, 0.82% Native American, 0.14% from other races, and 0.68% from two or more races. Hispanic or Latino of any race were 0.55% of the population.

There were 302 households, out of which 32.5% had children under the age of 18 living with them, 55.3% were married couples living together, 8.6% had a female householder with no husband present, and 31.5% were non-families. 24.8% of all households were made up of individuals, and 7.6% had someone living alone who was 65 years of age or older. The average household size was 2.42 and the average family size was 2.91.

In the village, the population was spread out, with 26.0% under the age of 18, 7.8% from 18 to 24, 32.1% from 25 to 44, 22.1% from 45 to 64, and 12.0% who were 65 years of age or older. The median age was 35 years. For every 100 females, there were 96.8 males. For every 100 females age 18 and over, there were 99.3 males.

The median income for a household in the village was $37,500, and the median income for a family was $44,028. Males had a median income of $31,935 versus $22,042 for females. The per capita income for the village was $17,926. About 6.4% of families and 5.6% of the population were below the poverty line, including 3.2% of those under age 18 and 9.3% of those age 65 or over.

== Economy ==
Dresser is home to the Traprock Quarry, Trollhaugen Ski/Snowboard Area, F&A Dairy, and a UFE Manufacturing plant. The village also has a gas station, auto repair, bar, restaurants, a library, elementary school, and several little parks. It is the home of Tenere, Inc., a manufacturing company owned by a private equity firm.

== Police controversy ==
In 2018, a television news outlet broadcast video of Chief of Police Ryan Haass having several drinks at a bar, and reported that soon after leaving that bar he drove his vehicle into a ditch, then abandoned his vehicle and went home. After a citizen filed a complaint with the city, a hearing was held which determined that no disciplinary action was indicated. The village attorney did, however, recommend that the chief keep the board up-to-date on his efforts towards sobriety.

== See also ==
- Citizens for the St. Croix Valley political organization
