= Ski Bradford =

Ski area in Haverhill, Massachusetts

Coordinates: 42°44′37″N 71°03′32″W

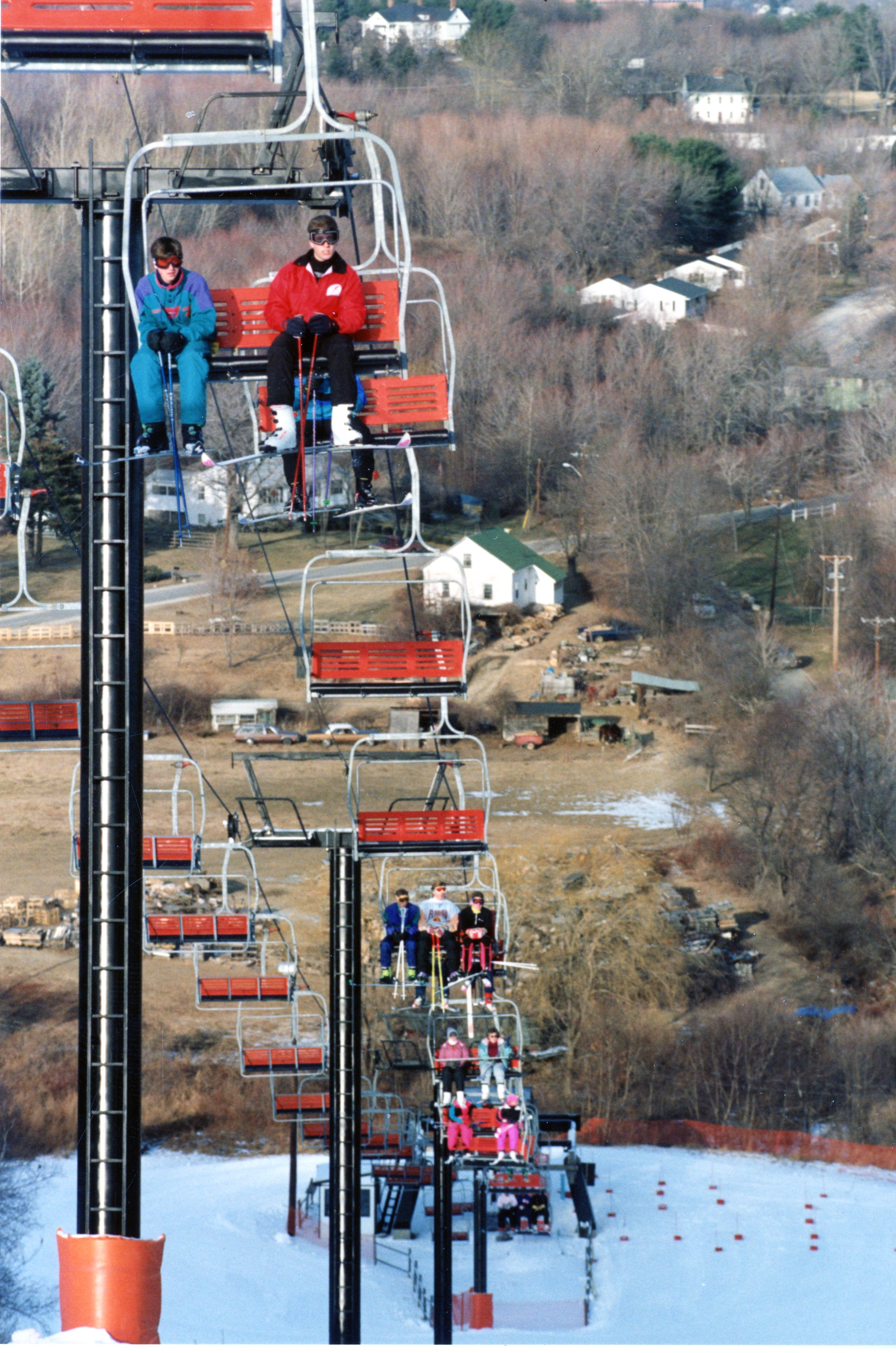
- Bradford Ski lift around the 1980s
- Interactive map of Ski Bradford
- Location: Bradford, Massachusetts, US
- Nearest city: Haverhill
- Top elevation: 272 feet (83 m)
- Skiable area: 48 acres (190,000 m^{2})
- Trails: 15
- Lift system: 9: Three triple chairs, one T-bar, two rope tows and three Wonder Carpet.
- Website: Ski Bradford

Ski Bradford (also known as Bradford Ski Area) is a small ski area located in the Bradford section of Haverhill, Massachusetts.

== Terrain ==
Ski Bradford consists of 3 green circles or easy, 4 blue squares or intermediate trails and 8 black diamonds or difficult. Ski Bradford has also includes a terrain park. Ski Bradford is part of Dead Hill which has a summit elevation of 272 feet (83 m).

== Lifts ==
Ski Bradford currently has 3 chairlifts, and 6 surface lifts.

Name	Type	Manufacturer	Built	Length (feet)	Vertical (feet)	Notes
Hornet	Triple Chair	Borvig	1983	1100	213	Main lift on the mountain, directly out of the base lodge.
Wasp	Triple Chair	Borvig	1988	1024	207	This lift is mainly used by ski racers using the wasp trail for race training and race events.
Evvy's Double Nickel	Triple Chair	Partek	2003	995	200	Serves the terrain park, and 2 other trails.
Hornet	T-Bar	Müller	1971	1200	208	This lift is a backup for the Hornet chair, and used when crowds are heavy at the base area.
Stinger	Rope Tow	Homemade		440	50	The main, and slightly longer rope tow serving the beginner area.
Queen	Rope Tow	Homemade		345	35	One of three rope tows serving the beginner area, it runs parallel to the Drone rope.
Drone	Rope Tow	Homemade		345	35	One of three rope tows serving the beginner area, it runs parallel to the Queen rope.
Roger's	Magic Carpet	SunKid	2006			Runs perpendicular to the three rope tows.
Ken's	Magic Carpet	SunKid	2009			The second carpet built for Ski Bradford.
