= Sitzmark Ski Area =

Ski area in Washington, United States

- Location in Washington Sitzmark (the United States)
- Location: Okanogan County, Washington, U.S.
- Nearest city: Tonasket: 25 mi (40 km)
- Coordinates: 48.865°N 119.164°W
- Vertical: 650 ft (200 m)
- Top elevation: 4,950 ft (1,510 m)
- Base elevation: 4,300 ft (1,300 m)
- Skiable area: 80 acres (0.3 km^{2})
- Trails: 10: 2 easiest; 4 more difficult; 5 most difficult
- Lift system: 1 chairlift 1 rope tow
- Lift capacity: 1700/hr
- Terrain parks: 1
- Snowfall: 60 inches (1,500 mm)
- Website: Sitzmark Ski Area on Facebook

Sitzmark Ski Area is a small ski area near the community of Havillah, Okanogan County, Washington, 20 miles (32 km) northeast of the city of Tonasket. The area's 10 named trails, covering 80 skiable acres, are located on Knob Hill. The base elevation is at 4,300 feet (1,300 m) and the top at 4,950 feet (1,510 m), yielding a vertical drop of 650 feet (200 m). Its slopes are served by one double chairlift and one rope tow.

The area's "signature run" is Stump Run.
