= Otis Ridge =

Ski area in Otis, Massachusetts

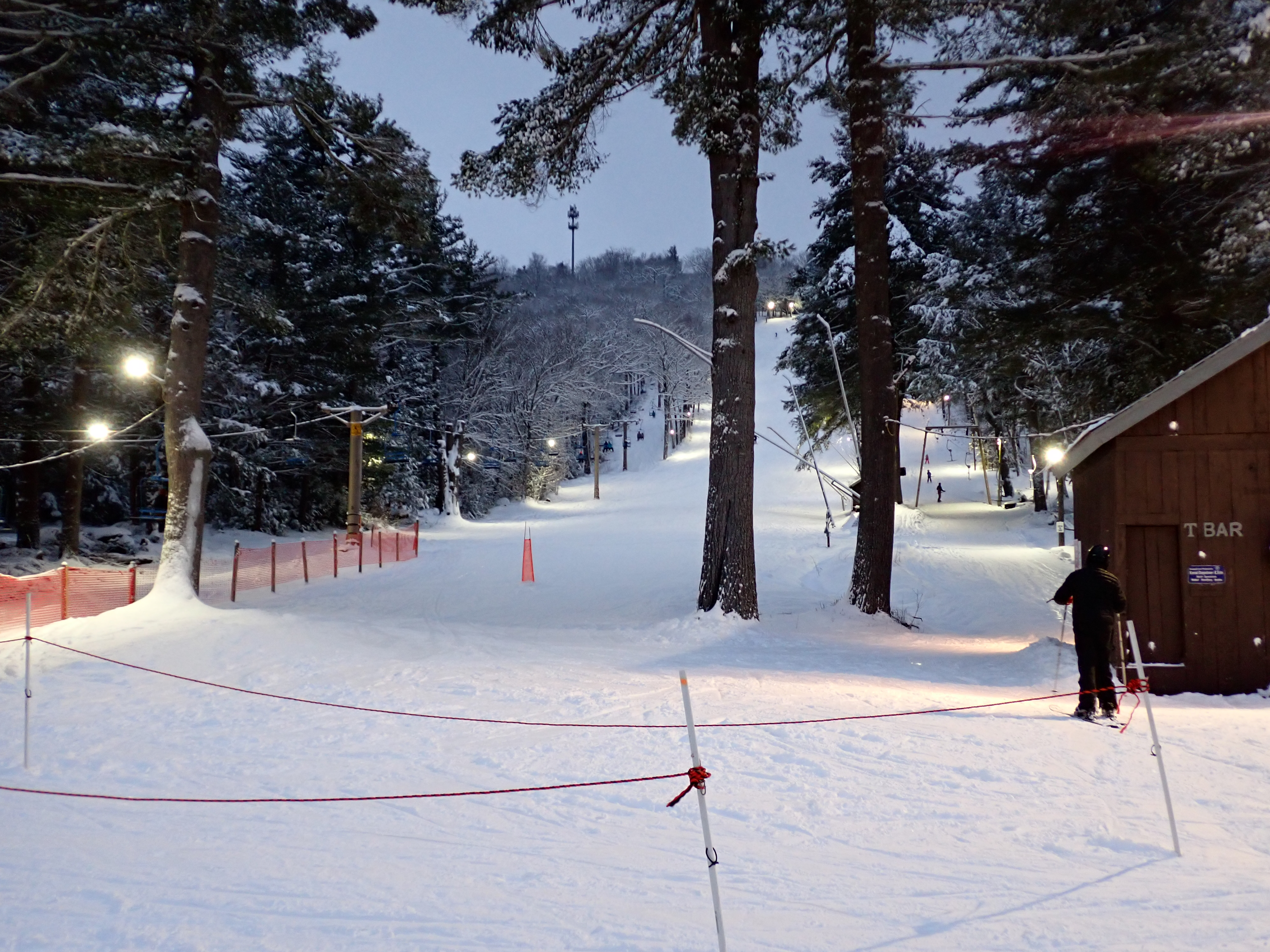
- Night skiing in 2026
- Interactive map of Otis Ridge
- Location: 159 Monterey Rd, Otis, Massachusetts
- Nearest city: Springfield, Massachusetts
- Coordinates: 42.1964°N 73.0988°W
- Vertical: 400 ft (120 m)
- Top elevation: 1,490 ft (450 m)
- Base elevation: 1,025 ft (312 m)
- Skiable area: 132 acres (53 ha)
- Trails: 11 trails
- Longest run: Acorn
- Lift system: 1 double, 3 surface lifts (2 rope tows, 1 T-Bar)
- Night skiing: 5 trails

Otis Ridge is a ski area located in Otis, Massachusetts in southeastern Berkshire County about 6 miles east of Great Barrington. It first opened in 1946 with two surface lifts and a single trail.

In 1960, there were five runs with one J-bar lift, one pomalift, and two rope tows. Lift fees were US$4 per day.

Otis Ridge currently has one double chair and three surface lifts: a pony tow, a handle tow, and a T-Bar. The mountain is owned by Ski Butternut, who acquired it in 2016 to save the historic ski area from foreclosure. Otis is known for their historically renowned racing program.

== Trails ==
Otis Ridge has a total of 11 trails. The longest trail is Acorn which is a green trail. The steepest trail at Otis is Slalom. The slalom trail is where the ski team practices and is located in between the T-Bar and the Double chair.
