= Northeast Slopes =

Ski area in Vermont, United States

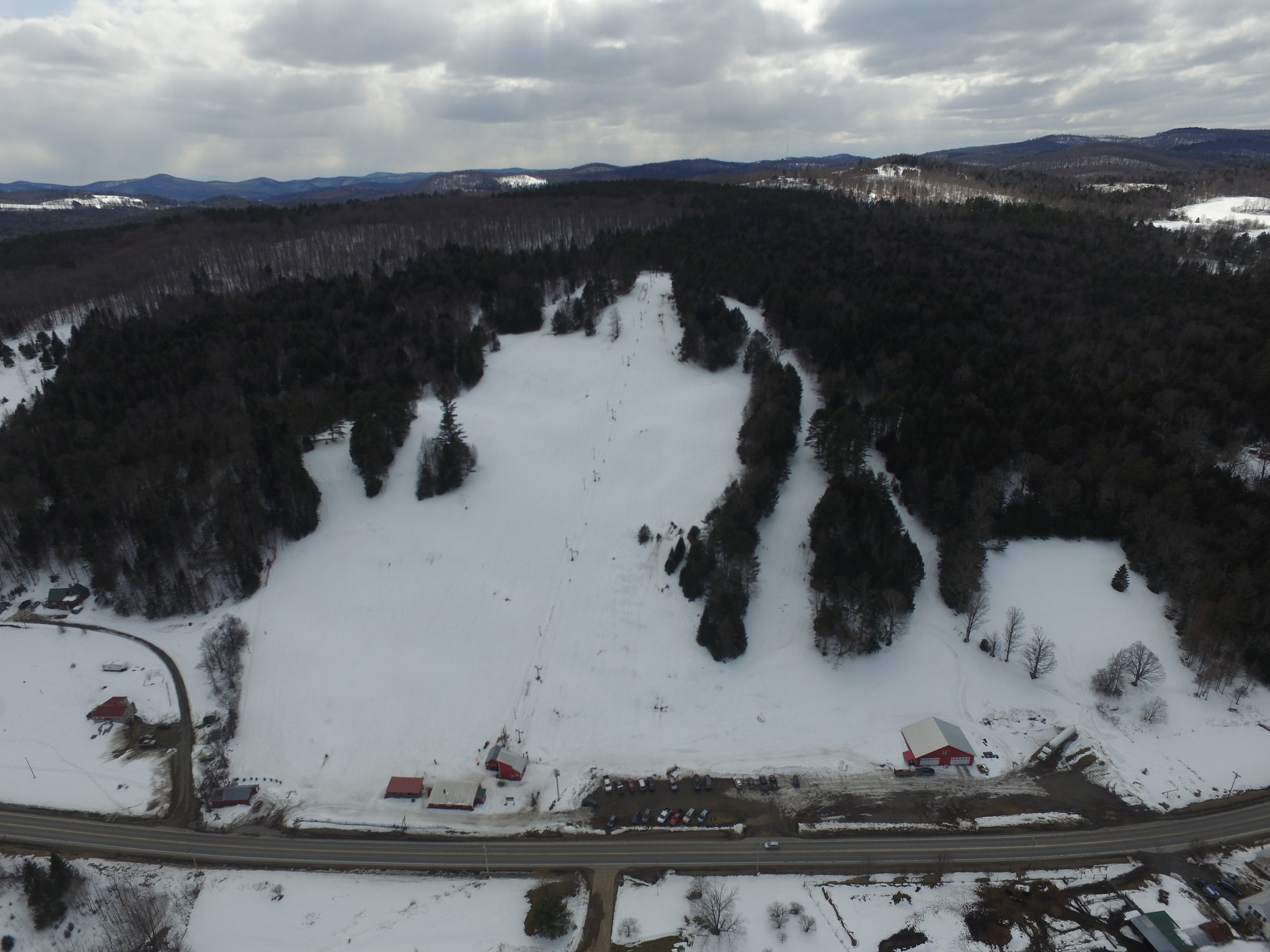
- Northeast Slopes
- Interactive map of Northeast Slopes
- Location: Corinth, Vermont, USA
- Coordinates: 44°4′21″N 72°15′1″W
- Vertical: 340 feet (104 m)
- Top elevation: 1,150 feet (351 m)
- Base elevation: 810 feet (247 m)
- Skiable area: 35 acres (14 ha)
- Trails: 12
- Website: https://northeastslopes.org

Northeast Slopes is a ski area located in Corinth, Vermont, United States. Northeast Slopes is operated entirely by volunteers. It has approximately 340 vertical feet of skiing across 35 acres of terrain served by two rope tows and a T-Bar.

== History ==
Northeast Slopes began in 1936 from an agreement between Bradford, VT Winter Sports Club president George Eaton, and land owner Eugene Eastman.
