= Lonesome Pine Trails =

Ski area in Fort Kent, Maine

Coordinates: 47°13′58″N 68°35′35″W

Lonesome Pine Trails is a ski resort located in Fort Kent, Maine.
