= Ski Santa Fe =

Ski resort in New Mexico, United States

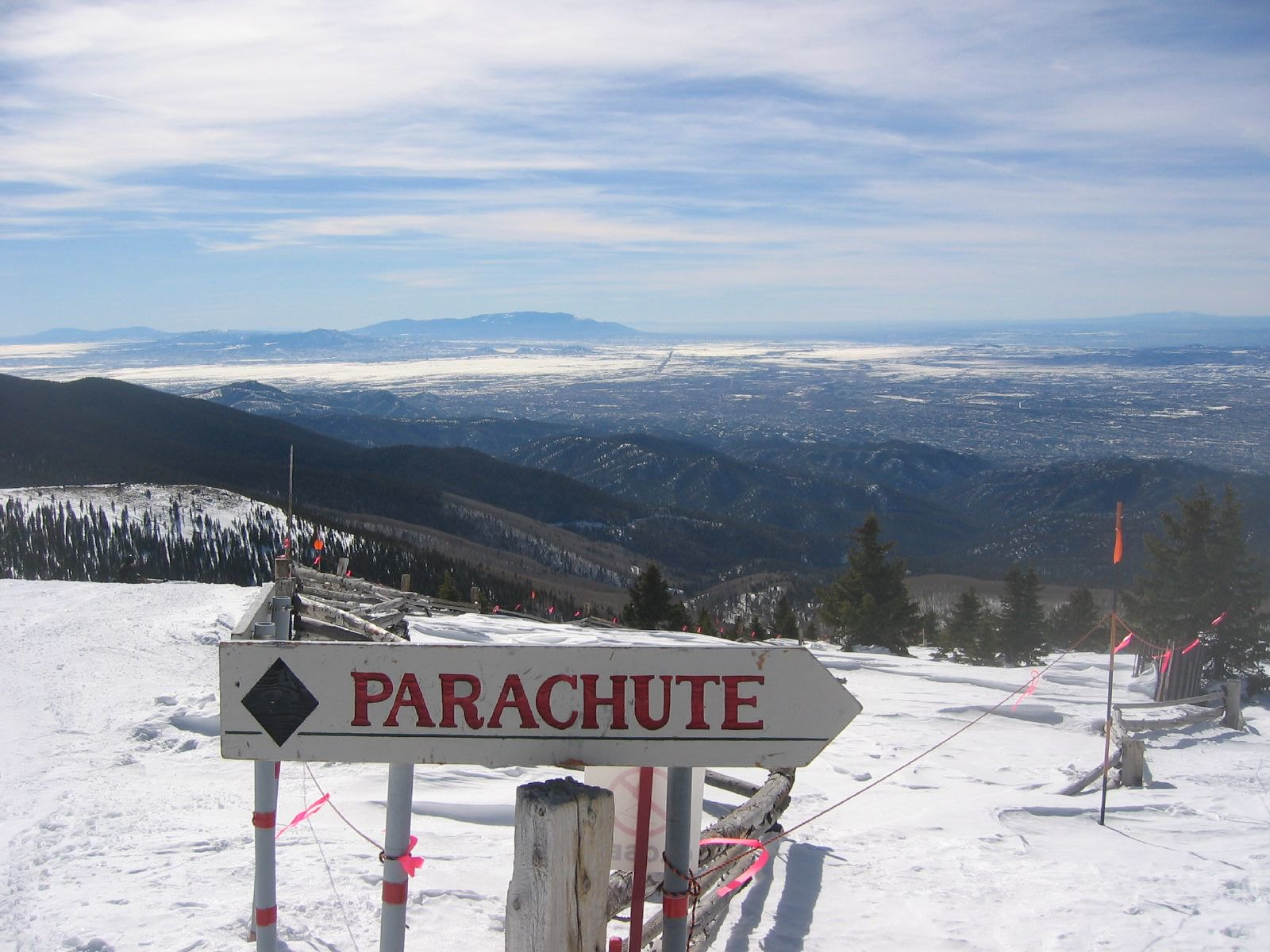
- Parachute Run

- Location in the United States Location in New Mexico
- Location: Santa Fe County, New Mexico, U.S.
- Nearest city: Santa Fe
- Coordinates: 35°47′46.77″N 105°48′4.61″W
- Vertical: 1,725 feet (526 m)
- Top elevation: 12,075 feet (3,680 m)
- Base elevation: 10,350 feet (3,155 m)
- Skiable area: 660 acres (2.7 km^{2})
- Trails: 88 total: 20% beginner; 40% intermediate; 40% advanced
- Lift system: 7 lifts: 1 double lift, 2 triple lifts, 2 quad lifts, 2 surface lifts
- Terrain parks: 3
- Snowfall: 225 inches (18.8 ft; 5.7 m)
- Website: skisantafe.com

Ski Santa Fe or Santa Fe Ski Basin is a medium-sized ski resort located in the Sangre de Cristo Mountains in Santa Fe County, New Mexico, United States, 16 miles east of the state capital of Santa Fe. It includes 7 lifts and 88 runs at elevations of over 10,000 feet (3,000 m). It is the southernmost major ski resort of the Rocky Mountains, and one of the oldest and highest in the nation.

== History ==
In 1936, the first rope tow in New Mexico, powered by a Packard sedan engine, was installed in the Sangre de Cristos at the future site of the resort, overseen by Robert Nordhaus (father of Nobel Prize-winning economist William Nordhaus), a retired lawyer, and a businessman and skier, who also founded the Albuquerque Ski Club and La Madera Ski Area, now known as Sandia Peak Ski Area. Shortly after its installation, he installed a rope tow at La Madera.

During World War II, the 10th Mountain Division trained in the area and helped construct ski runs throughout the southern Rockies.

In 1949, the Sierras de Santa Fe group founded the Santa Fe Ski Basin, and raised the money to construct its first chairlift. In 1950, the basin was purchased by one Joe Juhan and managed by championship skier Ernie Blake, who would go on to found Taos Ski Valley, the largest ski resort in the state.

== Description ==
Ski Santa Fe is situated in the alpine forests near the tree line of the Sangre de Cristo Mountains of northern New Mexico, at an elevation of 10,350–12,075 feet (3,155–3,680 m), making it one of the highest major ski resorts in the United States. It is located 16 miles east of the city of Santa Fe. Access is provided from downtown Santa Fe to the base lodge via New Mexico State Road 475.

A large ski lodge, La Casa, is located at the ski base and features three restaurants: La Casa Cafe, Totemoff's Bar & Grill, and Terrace Grill. It also includes gift shops, a rental center, a sports equipment shop, a ski patrol station, lockers, and two ski instruction schools: Chipmunk Corner, for beginner skiers ages 5–10 or snowboarders 8-10; and the Snow Sports School, for ages 10+. Skiers 10–11 years old may opt for either school.

Chipmunk Corner Ski School features a surface carpet and a private slope, Chippy Hill. The school operates out of a 3,220 square feet (299 m^{2}) building near the base lodge, with classrooms, a cafeteria, and a sports equipment center. Children's complex features age appropriate equipment and toys, including highchairs and cribs, an indoor play room, and an outdoor snow play area.

The resort covers two mountains, Lake Peak and Tesuque Peak. The ski runs run down to the base in a fan shape and include glades for advanced skiers. The resort includes 88 named runs and eight lifts, including two magic carpet lifts.

Midway down the slope is another restaurant at Totemoff's Bar & Grill.

The resort grooms and maintains the snow surface, and, if necessary, can produce new snow. Lodging for the resort is located in the city of Santa Fe.

== Ski Santa Fe statistics ==
=== Elevation ===
- Base: 10,350 feet (3,150 m)
- Summit: 12,075 feet (3,680 m)
- Vertical Rise: 1,725 feet (530 m)

=== Developed Terrain ===
- Mountains: 2 (Tesuque Peak, Lake Peak)
- Skiable Area: 660 acres (2.7 km^{2})
- Trails: 88 total (20% beginner, 40% intermediate, 40% advanced)
- Terrain Parks: 3
- Average Snowfall: 325 inches (830 cm) annually

=== Lifts ===
As of 2026, Santa Fe Ski has a total of 7 lifts.

1 double chairlift

2 triple chairlifts

2 quad chairlifts (1 fixed grip and 1 detachable)

2 magic carpet surface lifts

== See also ==
- List of New Mexico ski resorts
- Sandia Peak Ski Area
- Taos Ski Valley
