= Ski Cloudcroft =

Ski resort in New Mexico, United States

- Location in the United States Location in New Mexico
- Location: Cloudcroft, Otero County, New Mexico, U.S.
- Nearest city: Las Cruces
- Coordinates: 32°57′2.55″N 105°42′26.07″W
- Vertical: 700 feet (213 m)
- Top elevation: 9,100 feet (2,774 m)
- Base elevation: 8,400 feet (2,560 m)
- Skiable area: 74 acres (0.30 km^{2})
- Trails: 25 total: 32% beginner; 28% intermediate; 32% advanced; 8% expert
- Lift system: 3 lifts: 1 double lift, 2 surface lifts
- Snowfall: 120 inches (10.0 ft; 3.0 m)
- Website: skicloudcroft.net

Ski Cloudcroft is a small ski area located in the village of Cloudcroft in the Sacramento Mountains of Otero County, New Mexico, United States.

== History ==
Ski Cloudcroft was founded in 1963 with a T-bar lift. The T-bar had a rise of 440 feet (130 m) and a length of 1,570 feet (480 m). A second T-bar was added the following year with a considerably shorter rise of 140 feet (43 m).

The chairlift was added in 1983, It is a fixed-distance double chairlift with a rise of 590 feet (180 m) and a length of 2,256 feet (688 m).

== Ski Cloudcroft statistics ==
Due to its southerly location, operation dates are subject to snowfall conditions. Consequently, the area operates only sporadically.

=== Elevation ===
- Base: 8,400 feet (2,560 m)
- Summit: 9,100 feet (2,770 m)
- Vertical Rise: 700 feet (210 m)

=== Developed Terrain ===
- Mountains: 1
- Skiable Area: 74 acres (0.30 km^{2})
- Trails: 25 total (32% beginner, 28% intermediate, 32% advanced, 8% Expert)
- Average Snowfall: 120 inches (300 cm) annually

=== Lifts ===
As of 2021, Ski Cloudcroft has a total of 3 lifts.

1 double chairlift

2 surface lifts

- 1 handle tow
- 1 rope tow

== See also ==
- List of New Mexico ski resorts
- Sandia Peak Ski Area
- Taos Ski Valley
