= Liberty Mountain Resort =

Ski area in Pennsylvania, United States

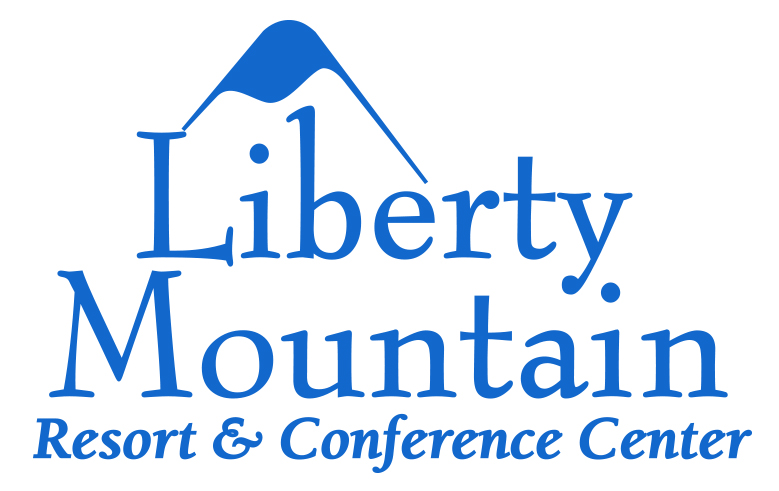
- Liberty Mountain Resort base area
- Interactive map of Liberty Mountain Resort
- Location: Carroll Valley, Pennsylvania, United States
- Nearest city: Gettysburg, Pennsylvania(8 miles)
- Coordinates: 39°45′48.6″N 77°22′30″W
- Vertical: 620 feet (190 m)
- Top elevation: 1,190 feet (360 m)
- Base elevation: 570 feet (170 m)
- Skiable area: 100 acres (0.40 km^{2})
- Trails: 22 total 27% beginner 41% intermediate 14% advanced 18% expert
- Longest run: "Dipsy Doodle" ~ 5,200 feet (1584.96 m)
- Lift system: 8 total (5 quad chair, 3 surface)
- Terrain parks: 3
- Snowfall: 31 in/year (.78 m/year)
- Website: http://www.libertymountainresort.com

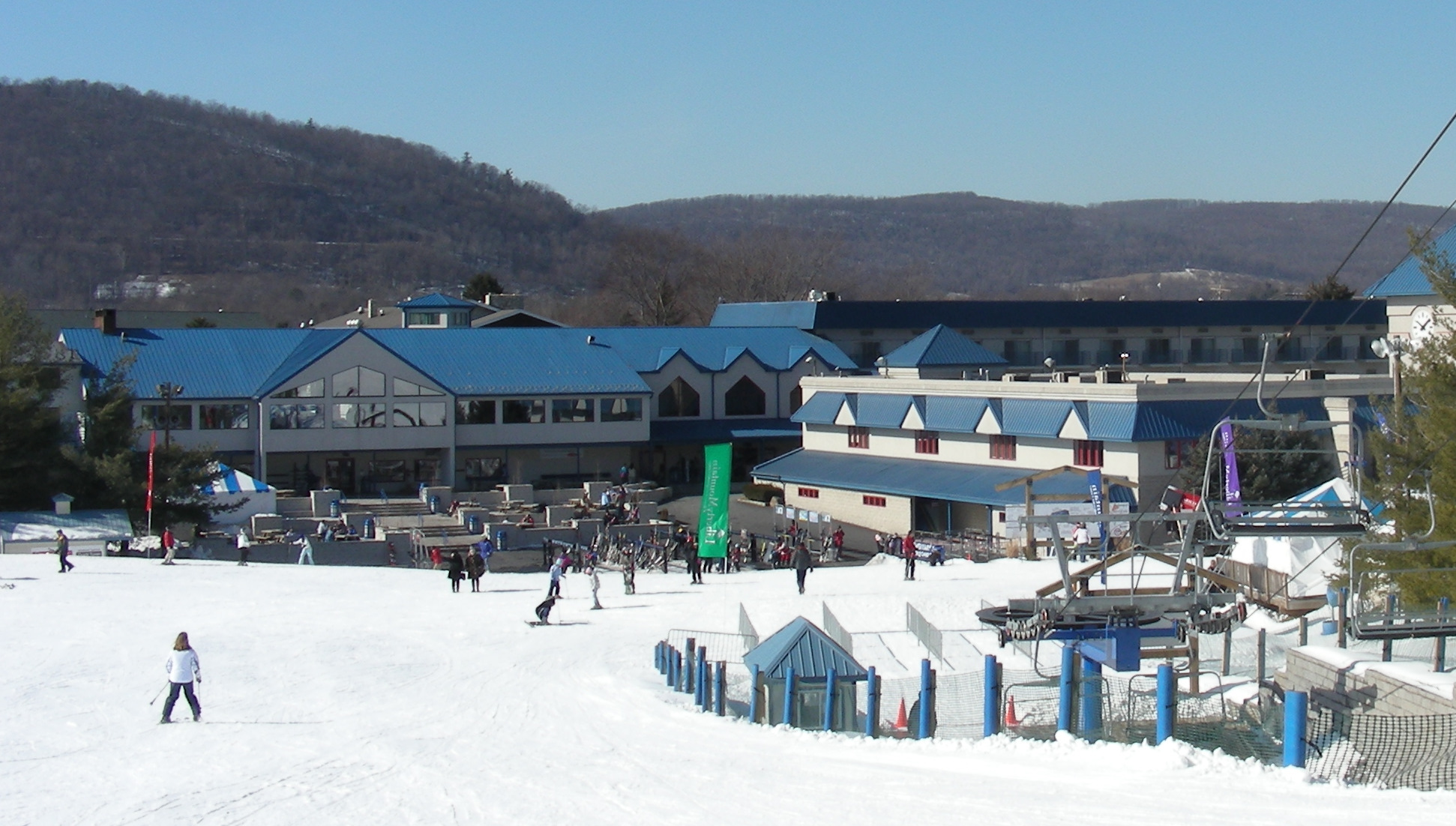

Liberty Mountain Resort is a resort located in southern Pennsylvania. During the winter months the resort offers skiing, snowboarding, and snow tubing. The onsite hotel and lodge is open year-round and offers 114 rooms and multiple options for weddings and meetings. During the spring, summer, and fall the 18 hole Carroll Valley Golf Course at Liberty Mountain is open for a round of golf.

Vail Resorts purchased Liberty Mountain from Peak Resorts, along with Peak's 16 other resorts, in 2019.

== History ==
The resort was originally developed in the mid 1960s as a focal point for a major real estate development. The name of the ski mountain and the development was Charnita, named after Charles and Anita Rist, the developer and his wife. Charlie Rist hired Dick Brown, who had just designed the neighboring Ski Roundtop the year before, to develop and manage the Charnita ski area. After the Tri-County Citizens Committee efforts "to prevent the continued growth of the Charnita development" in 1970, the development suffered bankruptcy.

Irv Naylor, the owner and founder of Snow Time, Inc. purchased the mountain in 1974 and renamed it Ski Liberty. It was renamed again in the late 1990s to Liberty Mountain Resort.

In 2003, Snow Time, Inc added the Boulder Ridge Snow Tubing area. In May 2010 Liberty Mountain purchased The Carroll Valley Resort giving Liberty a total of 99 rooms as well as adding two more restaurants (The Tavern on the Green and The Inn) and an 18-hole golf course. In 2015, Liberty Mountain completed building the new Highland Lodge which brought their total number of hotel rooms up to 116, while adding state-of-the-art meeting and conference space, as well as replacing the two restaurants from Carroll Valley with Eagle & the Owl, a public house themed restaurant and Ike's Chophouse.

Peak Resorts purchased the mountain in 2018 from Snow Time Inc., along with Snow Time's two other resorts, Whitetail Ski Resort and Roundtop Mountain Resort.

== Trails ==
Liberty Mountain possesses slopes with varying levels of difficulty. The trail names are as follows:

Easier Trails: Nova, Sneaky Pete, Dipsy Doodle, First Class Area, Lower Blue Streak, Snow Cat Alley, Vertigo, Adventure Alley

More Difficult Trails: Upper Heavenly, Lower Heavenly, Whitney's Way, Lower Ultra, Lower Eastwind, Lower Strata, Sidewinder

Most Difficult Trails: White Lightning, Upper Blue Streak

Extremely Difficult Trails: Upper Ultra, Upper Eastwind, Upper Strata

Terrain Parks: West Side Park, East Side Park

The Half Pipe at Liberty Mountain has since been removed as it was deemed too much work to maintain and cover with snow. The Half Pipe was usually only open for at most a month of the ski season, but some years not even open at all. The area where the Half Pipe was located was filled in and is now the East Side terrain park.

== Statistics ==
- Elevation: Front base 570 ft (170 m), Back base 650 ft (200 m).
- Summit: 1,190 ft (360 m).
- Vertical Drop: Front side 620 ft (190 m), Back side 550 ft (170 m).
- Longest Run: Dipsy Doodle 5,200 ft (1,600 m).
- Number of Trails: 16
- Slope Difficulty: 27% Beginner, 41% intermediate, 14% advanced, 18% expert
- Lifts: 5 Quads, 3 carpet lifts
- Rental Equipment: 2,500 shaped Volkl skis with Marker bindings, 1000 Burton snowboards
- Night Skiing: 100% terrain, 7 nights a week
- Uphill Capacity: 13,400 skiers/hour
- Snowmaking: 100%
- Skiing Season: December to mid-March (weather dependent)
- Lodging: Year-round, 116 room Slopeside/Golfside available hotel
