= Trollhaugen =

Ski area in Wisconsin, United States

- Interactive map of Trollhaugen
- Location: Dresser, Wisconsin
- Nearest city: Osceola
- Coordinates: 45.3513°N 92.6181°W
- Skiable area: 80 acres (32 ha)
- Trails: 30
- Longest run: 2,500 ft (0.47 mi; 0.76 km)
- Lift system: 4 tow ropes 4 quad lifts
- Terrain parks: 3
- Snowmaking: 100%
- Night skiing: Yes
- Website: https://trollhaugen.com/

Trollhaugen is a ski resort located in Dresser, Wisconsin, United States. The ski area consists of 30 trails, including 3 terrain parks. In addition to offering ski and snowboard opportunities, Trollhaugen offers 10 lanes of snow tubing during the winter, as well as zip lining and a 120 element aerial challenge course in the summer. Trollhaugen offers NASTAR (National Standard Race) events throughout the season. Trollhaugen is notable for their terrain park, rated the 3rd best in the Midwest Region by TransWorld Snowboarding Magazine. Trollhaugen is also known for being open until 3am on Friday nights in the winter for late night skiing and snowboarding.

== Area information ==
=== History ===
Trollhaugen was opened in 1950. It is one of the longest running snow sports areas in the midwest. It was created by Lee Rogers and Walter G. Peterson in the fall of 1950. It began with one tow rope and three slopes. By 1956 Trollhaugen provided skiers with five tow ropes and six slopes. It also had a chalet to provide some hospitality. Trollhaugen was sold in 1967 to Dr. Ray Rochford and Dr. Anne Rochford, both dentists from St. Paul, Minnesota. The tubing hill and chalet were added in 2004. Trollhaugen's Adventure Park, consisting of a 6-line zip line tour and 120 element aerial challenge course, was installed in the fall of 2012.

=== Stats ===
- Number of Runs: 30
  - Snowmaking Coverage: 100%
  - Grooming Coverage:100%
  - Night Skiing: 100%
- Terrain
  - Advanced: 22%
  - Intermediate: 40%
  - Beginner: 28%
  - Vertical: 260 Feet
  - Skiable terrain: 90 acres
  - Longest run: 2500 ft
  - Terrain Parks: 3-4
  - Average Snowfall: 50.7inches
- Lifts
  - Total Lifts: 8
    - Tow Ropes: 4
    - Quad Lifts: 4
- Zip Line
  - Total length of zip line: 3,000 ft

== Off mountain ==
Trollhaugen has two restaurants in the upper level of the chalet. One is the Kaffe Stuga, the other is the Skolhaugen Lounge. The Skolhaugen Lounge is a 21+ bar with menus to order from. On many Friday nights live music is offered in the Skolhaugen Lounge.

=== Recent additions ===
In the summer of 2013 Trollhaugen Opened up an aerial challenge ropes course and zip-line. The aerial challenge course offers six different circuits with four different difficulties, green (easy), yellow (medium), blue (difficult), and black (extremely difficult), with heights from 12 to 48 feet off the ground. The Zip Line Tour offers 6 zip lines across multiple platforms. Also offered is a 1000-foot dual Zip Line for tandem rides. In 2016, Trollhaugen added a kids challenge course, for ages 3–7, containing 13 different elements at a height of 2 feet off the ground.
