= Roundtop Mountain Resort =

Ski area in Pennsylvania, United States

Coordinates: 40.108°N 76.926°W

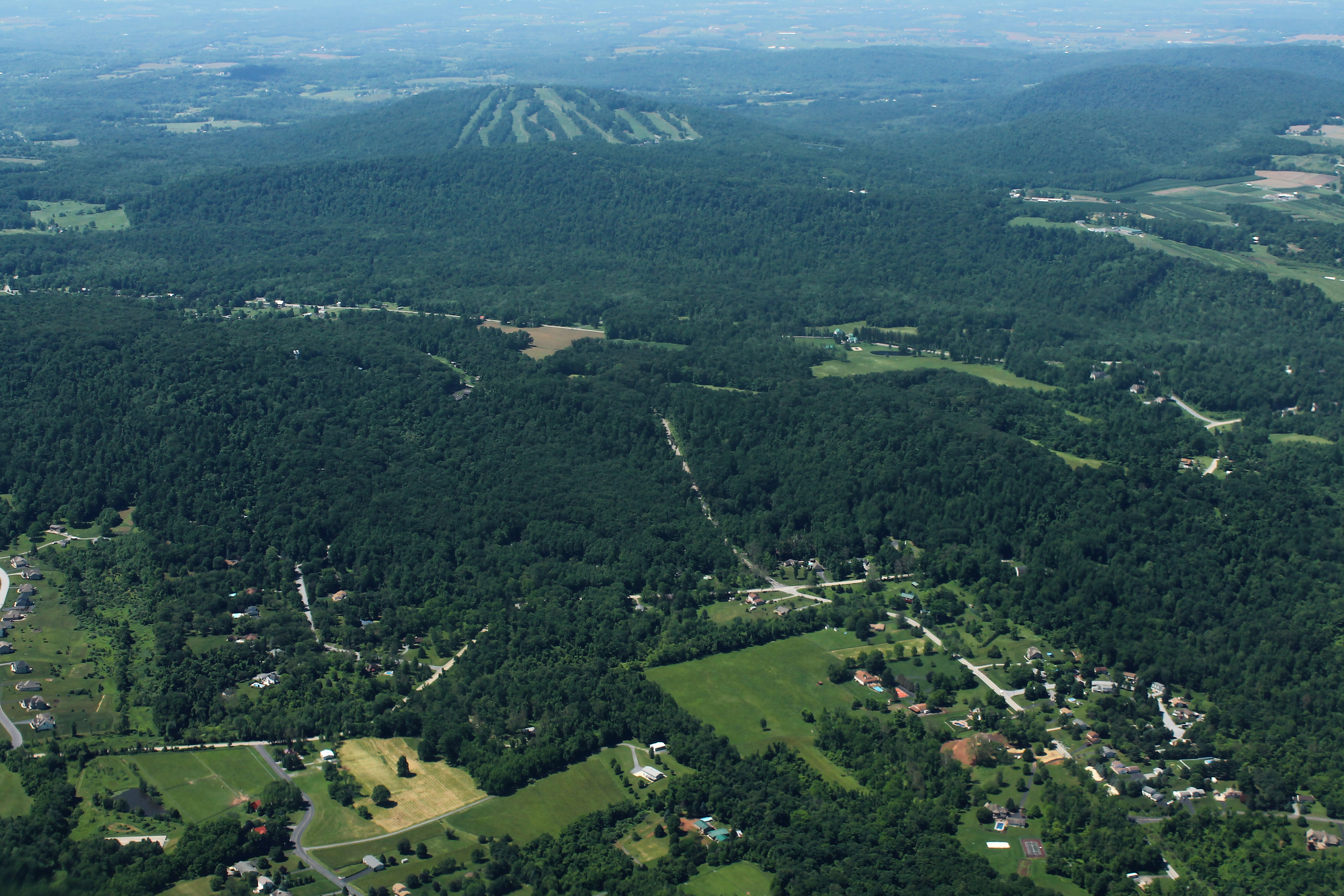
- Aerial image of Roundtop Mountain, with the resort visible
- Interactive map of Roundtop Mountain Resort
- Location: Warrington Township, York County, Pennsylvania, United States
- Nearest city: Lewisberry, Pennsylvania
- Vertical: 600 feet (180 m)
- Top elevation: 1,340 feet (410 m)
- Base elevation: 740 feet (230 m)
- Skiable area: 103 acres (0.42 km^{2})
- Trails: 22 total 29% Easier; 30% More Difficult; 31% Most Difficult; 10% Extremely Difficult
- Lift system: 9 total (3 quad chair, 2 triple chair, 1 J-Bar, 2 surface) (And also 1 tubing lift)
- Terrain parks: 4
- Website: http://www.skiroundtop.com

The Roundtop Mountain Resort is a resort located in York County, Pennsylvania. During the winter months the resort offers skiing, snowboarding, and snowtubing. During the spring, summer, and fall, Roundtop offers summer camp and paintball.

Along with two other resorts, Whitetail Ski Resort and Liberty Mountain Resort, it was owned by Snow Time, Inc. Peak Resorts purchased the mountain in 2018 from Snow Time Inc., along with Snow Time's two other resorts, Whitetail Ski Resort and Liberty Mountain Resort. Vail bought and now operates them.

== History ==
Roundtop Mountain Resort was originally developed under the name Ski Roundtop by Irvin Naylor in 1964. With other investors, Naylor formed Snow Time, Inc., to run the ski resort and leased the land to the corporation. Naylor's original stake in Snow Time, Inc. was 10 percent. After a number of successful years, the corporation bought the land from him. Naylor then used the proceeds to increase his stake in Snow Time, Inc. to a 75 percent share.

In October 2018, Ski Roundtop and the other two Snow Time resorts Whitetail Ski Resort and Liberty Mountain Resort were bought by Peak Resorts and in July 2019, Ski Roundtop, Whitetail Ski Resort and Liberty Mountain Resort were purchased by Vail Resorts.

== Statistics ==
- Elevation: Base 755 ft (230 m).
- Summit: 1,335 ft (407 m).
- Uphill Capacity: 11,000 m (36,000 ft)
- Vertical Drop: 600 ft (180 m)
- Number of Trails: 22
- Slope Difficulty: 29% Easier, 30% More Difficult, 31% Most Difficult, 10% Extremely Difficult
- Lifts: 3 Quads, 2 Triples, 1 J-bar, 2 carpet lifts (and also 1 tubing carpet)
- Night Skiing: 95% terrain, 7 nights a week
- Snowmaking: 100%
- Skiing Season: late-November to mid-March (weather dependent)

== Trails ==
Roundtop Mountain Resort possesses slopes with varying levels of difficulty. The trail names are as follows:

Easier Trails: Powderhorn, Drummer Boy, Fanny Hill, Discovery Area, Magic Mountain, Fife and Drum, J-Bar Park

More Difficult Trails: Lower Lafayette's Leap, Minuteman, Susquehanna, Lower Exhibition, Recruit

Most Difficult Trails: Upper Lafayette's Leap, Barrett's Trail, Upper Exhibition, Patriot, Lower Ramrod, Lower Gunbarrel, Palisade Glades

Extremely Difficult Trails: Upper Gunbarrel, Upper Ramrod

Terrain Parks: Recruit, Fife & Drum, J-Bar Park, and Bunker Hill

(Exhibition, Bunker Hill, Susquehanna, and Fanny Hill have also been designated as a terrain park/containing terrain park features in the past)
