= Peak Resorts =

American ski resort company (1977–2019)

Peak Resorts, Inc.
- Company type: Public
- Traded as: Nasdaq: SKIS; Russell Microcap Index component

Peak Resorts was a publicly traded company based in Wildwood, Missouri that operated ski resorts in the Midwest, Mid-Atlantic and Northeast portions of the United States. It was bought by Vail Resorts in 2019.

== History ==
The company was founded in 1977 by Tim Boyd two years after graduating the University of Missouri when he bought the Wildwood Golf Course in Wildwood, Missouri, for $250,000 with owner financing. In 1982, he added a ski resort that would become Hidden Valley Ski Area. Shortly thereafter, he opened a ski-resort in suburban Kansas City, Missouri, at Weston, Missouri (Snow Creek Ski Resort).

The company continued to expand owning Paoli Peaks in Paoli, Indiana; Boston Mills and Brandywine in Peninsula, Ohio.

In 2002, it expanded with Crotched Mountain in Bennington, New Hampshire. In addition it had long-term leases on Jack Frost and Big Boulder ski areas in Blakeslee, Pennsylvania in the Poconos as well as Mad River Mountain in Valley Hi, Ohio.

In 2002, the company acquired Crotched_Mountain_Ski_&_Ride in New Hampshire, a small ski area that had been shut for more than a decade. It built a new lodge, redid trails, and opened it in 2003.

In 2007, the company nearly tripled its revenue with the acquisition of Mount Snow in Vermont and Attitash in New Hampshire from the financially troubled American Skiing (which was owned by Oak Hill Capital Partners, a private equity company). The acquisition increased Peak Resorts ski visitors from 1 million to 1.7 million and revenue of $85 million. On October 21, 2010, the company announced it had entered into a purchase and sale agreement for Wildcat Mountain Ski Area in New Hampshire.

Previously privately owned, Peak Resorts shares began trading on the NASDAQ Global Market on November 21, 2014, under the ticker symbol "SKIS." Its IPO saw an offering of 10,000,000 shares of its common stock at a price to the public of $9.00 per share closed 9 days later on December 1, 2014.

On November 30, 2015, the company announced its intention to purchase Hunter Mountain adding its first New York mountain. The acquisition was completed on January 7, 2016, in an all-cash deal of $35 million, plus the assumption of two capital leases estimated at $1.8 million. For the 2016–17 ski season, Peak Resorts debuted the Peak Pass that linked its seven Northeast resorts.

On July 22, 2019, it was announced that Peak Resorts would be acquired by Vail Resorts, pending approvals. The transaction closed on September 24, 2019. The company's common stock was delisted from Nasdaq Global Select Market at the close of trading the same day.

== List of ski areas ==
Peak Resorts ski areas

Ski Resorts formerly owned and operated by Peak Resorts, at the height of their ownership in 2019:

East

- Crotched Mountain, New Hampshire (2003)
- Big Boulder, Pennsylvania (2005)
- Jack Frost Ski Resort, Pennsylvania (2005)
- Attitash Mountain Resort, New Hampshire (2007)
- Mount Snow, Vermont (2007)
- Wildcat Mountain Ski Area, New Hampshire (2010)
- Hunter Mountain, New York (2015)
- Liberty Mountain Resort, Pennsylvania (2018)
- Ski Roundtop, Pennsylvania (2018)
- Whitetail Ski Resort, Pennsylvania (2018)

Midwest

- Hidden Valley Ski Area, Missouri (1982)
- Snow Creek, Missouri (1985)
- Paoli Peaks, Indiana (1997)
- Alpine Valley Ski Area, Ohio (2001)
- Boston Mills, Ohio (2002)
- Brandywine, Ohio (2002)
- Mad River Mountain, Ohio (operator only) (2005)
