= Crotched Mountain Ski & Ride =

Ski resort in Bennington, New Hampshire, United States

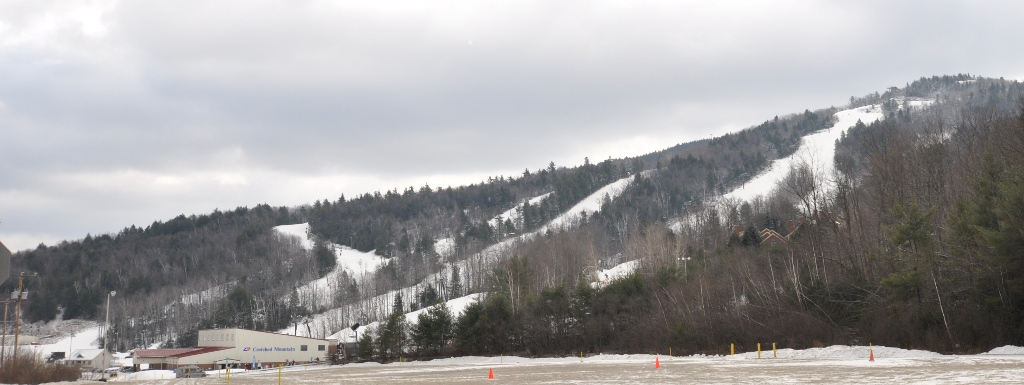
- View of ski area from Francestown Road
- Interactive map of Crotched Mountain Ski & Ride
- Location: Francestown/Bennington, New Hampshire, US
- Nearest city: Manchester
- Coordinates: 43°0′8.21″N 71°52′42.81″W
- Status: Operating
- Owner: Vail Resorts
- Top elevation: 2,066 ft (630 m)
- Base elevation: 1,050 ft (320 m)
- Skiable area: 75 acres (300,000 m^{2})
- Trails: 23; 32% Beginner; 36% Intermediate; 32% Expert
- Lift system: 1 HSQ, 1 quad, 1 triple, 1 double, 1 magic carpet
- Website: www.crotchedmtn.com

Crotched Mountain Ski & Ride is a medium-sized ski area located on Crotched Mountain in Bennington and Francestown, New Hampshire. The ski area reopened in 2003 after having been closed for 13 years. Crotched Mountain is 30 miles (48 km) east of Keene, 26 miles (42 km) west of Manchester, and 77 miles (124 km) northwest of Boston. The resort has become popular destination for night skiing. Visitors can ski until midnight during extended-hours on several nights each winter.

== History ==
The original Crotched Mountain Ski Area opened in 1964 on a different face of the mountain - the northeast side, entirely in Francestown. In 1970, a second area opened on the north side with the name Onset, later changed to Bobcat. Bobcat and the original Crotched Mountain merged in 1980 and operated jointly as Crotched Mountain. More than 100 adjacent condominium units were constructed in the late 1980s, creating a burden of debt that contributed to the demise of the resort in 1989.

The resort was bought in 2002 by St. Louis-based Peak Resorts, a company that ran a few North American ski areas, including Attitash Mountain Resort and Wildcat Mountain Ski Area in New Hampshire. The company spent an estimated $9 million to build a new lodge, install new, state of the art snowmaking equipment and chairlifts, and to recut trails, and in 2003 reopened what had been the Onset/Bobcat side as Crotched Mountain Ski Area.

In 2012, the resort installed a high-speed quad, bought from Ascutney Mountain Resort in Vermont.

The portion of the mountain with the original Crotched Mountain ski area is now largely owned by the town of Francestown.

In October 2019, Vail Resorts became the owner when it closed on a deal to buy Peak Resorts and all of its 17 ski areas.

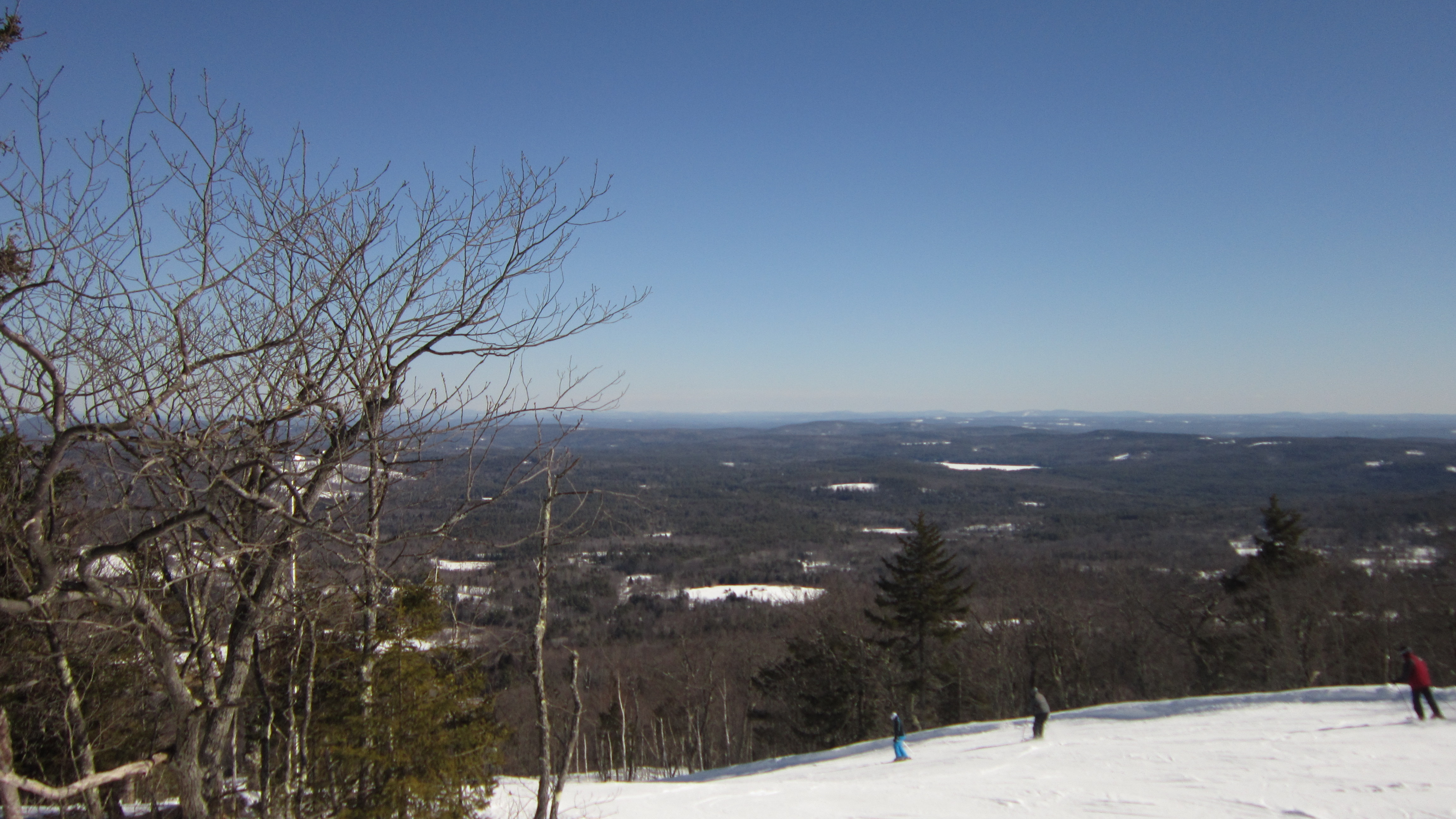
View from mountain towards Manchester

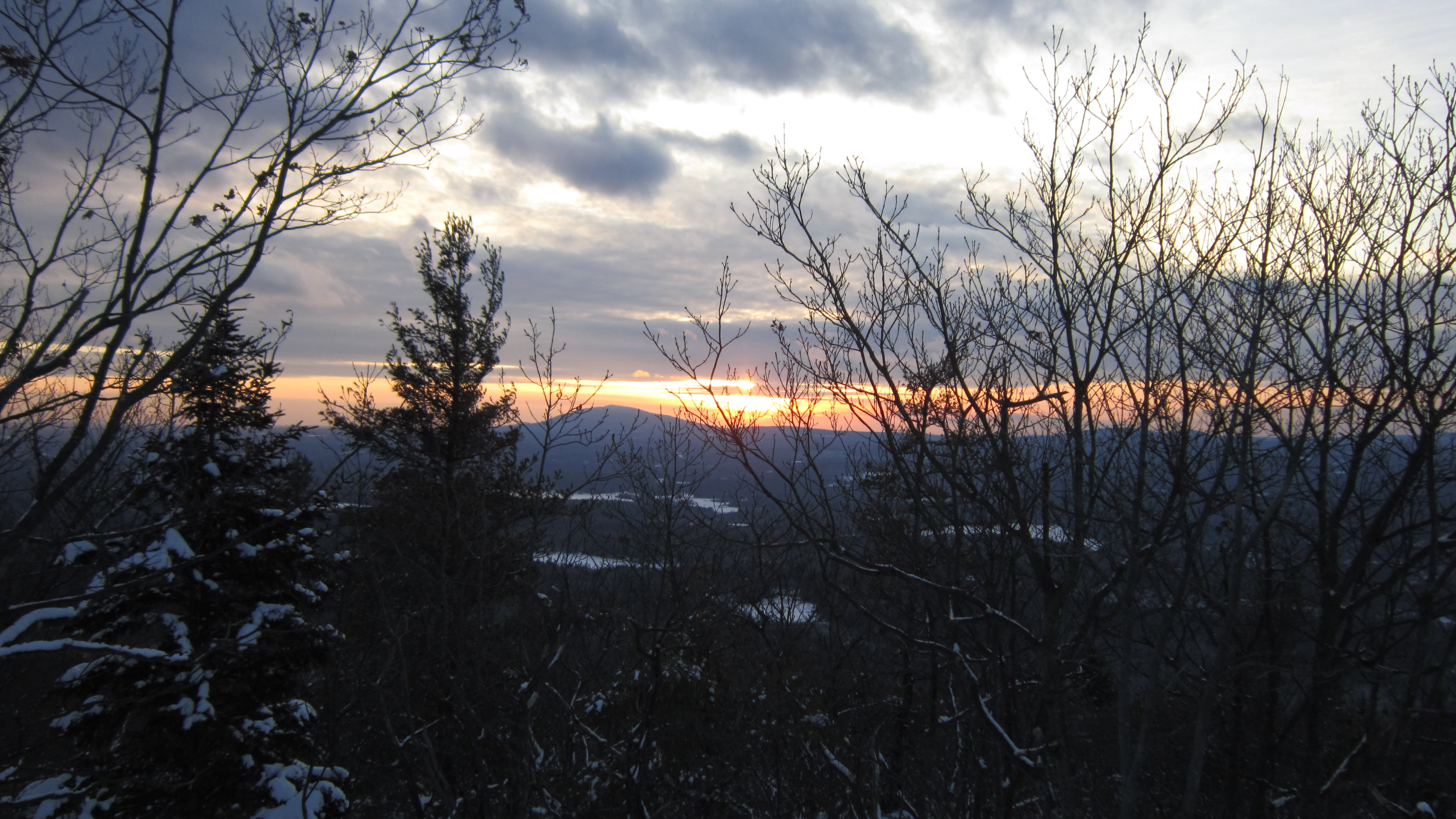
View from mountain towards Bennington

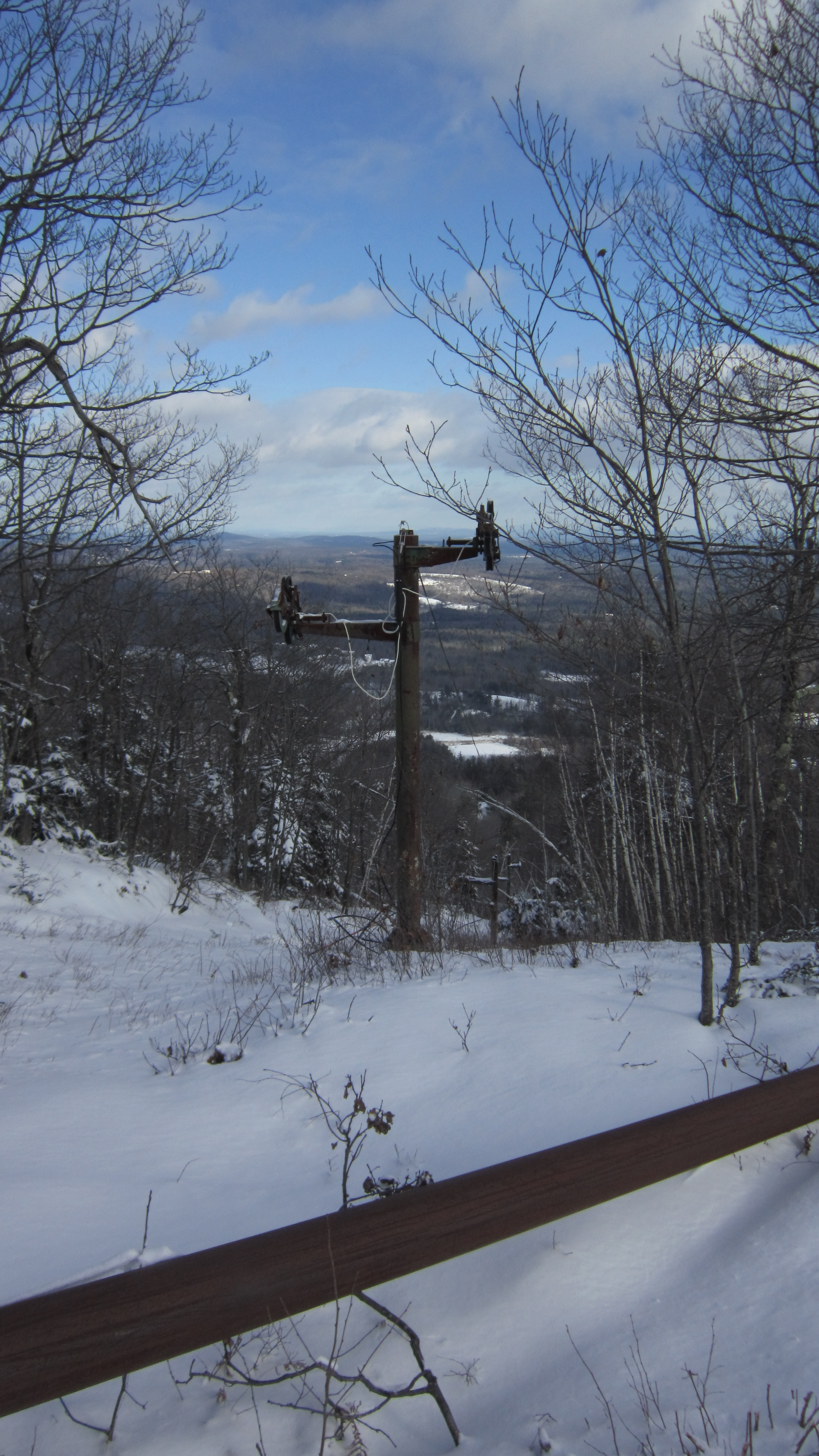
Old Summit T-bar
