= Wildcat Mountain Ski Area =

Ski area in New Hampshire, United States

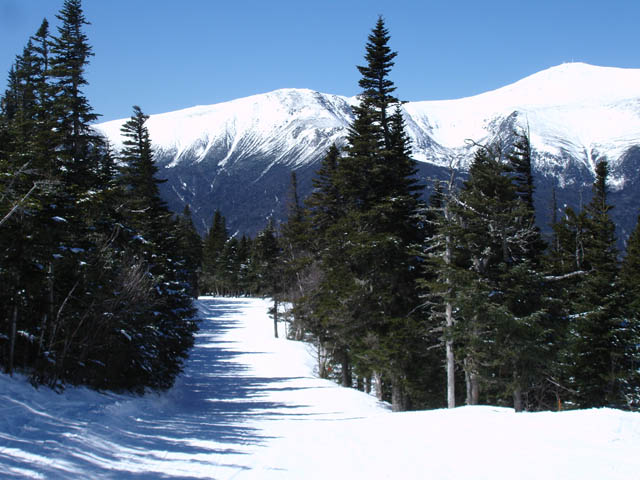
- The Upper Wildcat Trail
- Interactive map of Wildcat Mountain Ski Area
- Location: Pinkham's Grant, New Hampshire; United States
- Mountain: Wildcat Mountain
- Nearest city: Jackson, New Hampshire
- Coordinates: 44°15′47″N 71°14′18″W
- Status: Operating
- Owner: Vail Resorts
- Vertical: 2,112 feet (644 m)
- Top elevation: 4,062 feet (1,238 m)
- Base elevation: 1,950 feet (590 m)
- Skiable area: 225 acres (91 ha)
- Trails: 49; 25% Beginner; 45% Intermediate; 30% Expert
- Longest run: 2.75 miles (4.43 km)
- Lift system: 5 total: 1 hi-speed quad chair; 3 triple chairs; 1 Wonder Carpet
- Lift capacity: 6,700 skiers/hour
- Terrain parks: No
- Snowfall: 200 in (5.1 m)
- Snowmaking: Yes, 90%
- Website: www.skiwildcat.com

Wildcat Mountain Ski Area is a ski area located on Wildcat Mountain near Jackson, New Hampshire, United States, in the Mount Washington Valley. Its vertical drop of 2,112 feet (644 m) is the second largest in New Hampshire and the ninth largest in New England.

Wildcat is one of the best-known alpine skiing resorts in New England, with lifts from the base on NH 16 in Pinkham Notch 2,112 feet (644 m) up to the summit ridge. The area has 49 trails on 225 acres (91 ha), including the 2.75-mile (4.43 km) Polecat Trail — the longest ski trail in New Hampshire.

The Wildcat Valley Trail, an ungroomed cross-country ski trail, leads from the summit down to the town of Jackson, New Hampshire as part of the Jackson Ski Touring Foundation trail network, dropping 3,240 feet (990 m) in 11.1 miles (17.9 km).

== History ==
Wildcat is home to one of the oldest ski-racing trails in the United States. The original trail was built in 1933 by the Civilian Conservation Corps.

Wildcat's 1,950-foot (590 m) base elevation and proximity to Mount Washington produces an annual natural snowfall of over 200 inches (5,100 mm). As a result, the ski and snowboard season generally lasts from mid-November through early May.

In recent years, Wildcat has worked to improve its summer and fall activities. In addition to replacing the aging gondola lift with a new high-speed chairlift (which is converted to a gondola during the summer and fall), the area has added a zip line, served by a triple chairlift.

The resort was acquired in 1986 by Pat Franchi and family. In October 2010, they signed a deal to sell the ski area to Peak Resorts subject to approval by the U.S. Forest Service which owns the underlying land. The new operators decided to not honor lifetime passes sold under previous ownership, resulting in possible legal action.

In 2019, Wildcat and its sister resort, Attitash (in the town of Bartlett), were purchased by Vail Resorts. Tickets may be used at both mountains regardless of where they are purchased. The Epic Pass can be used at these mountains, and all other ski areas operated by Vail Resorts.

== Lifts ==
Wildcat currently has four operating chairlifts, with one detachable quad.

Name	Type	Builder	Year built	Vertical (feet)	Length (feet)	Ride Time (minutes)	Notes
Wildcat Express	High-Speed Quad	Doppelmayr	1997	2041	6616	6	Most vertical drop from one single lift in New England.
Tomcat	Triple	CTEC	1987	1390	4430	9.8	
Bobcat	Triple	Riblet	1982	762	2772	6.4	Used for ski racing and training.
Snowcat	Triple	Riblet	1974	237	1444	4.1	Main lift for the beginner area, and is the oldest lift on the mountain.

=== Wildcat Gondola ===
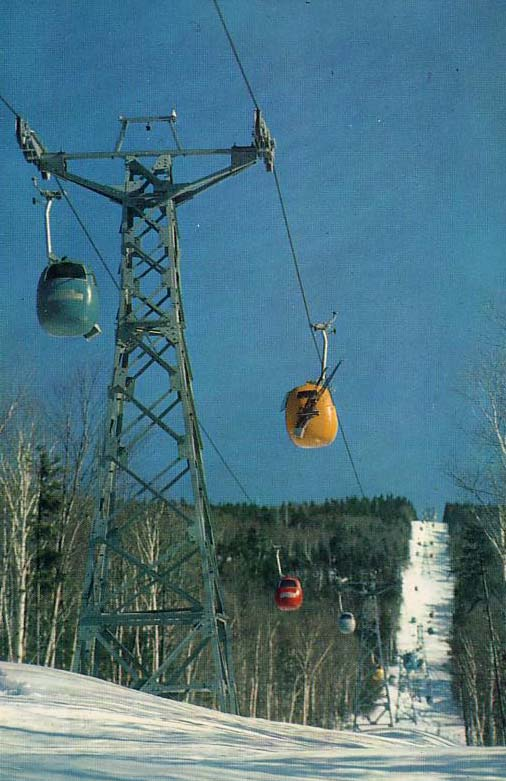
The Original Wildcat Gondola

Wildcat Mountain was the first ski area in North America to have a gondola lift, which opened on January 25, 1958. It was the first of many aerial lifts installed by Carlevaro-Savio in New England, and was the first lift constructed by the company in the United States. The gondola was known for its unique and colorful "cocoon" design, with each cabin holding two passengers each. Upon its decommission in 1998, the lift line was dismantled and the summit terminal was torn down in the following years after. The gondola cabins were saved and sold off, with many scattered across the state and throughout the east coast. The lift has since been replaced with a Doppelmayr high-speed chairlift known as the "Wildcat Express". Four-person gondola cabins were used for summer scenic operations on the Wildcat Express, however since Vail's acquisition of the mountain in 2019, the cabins have not been used.
