= Snow Creek (ski resort) =

Ski area in Missouri, United States

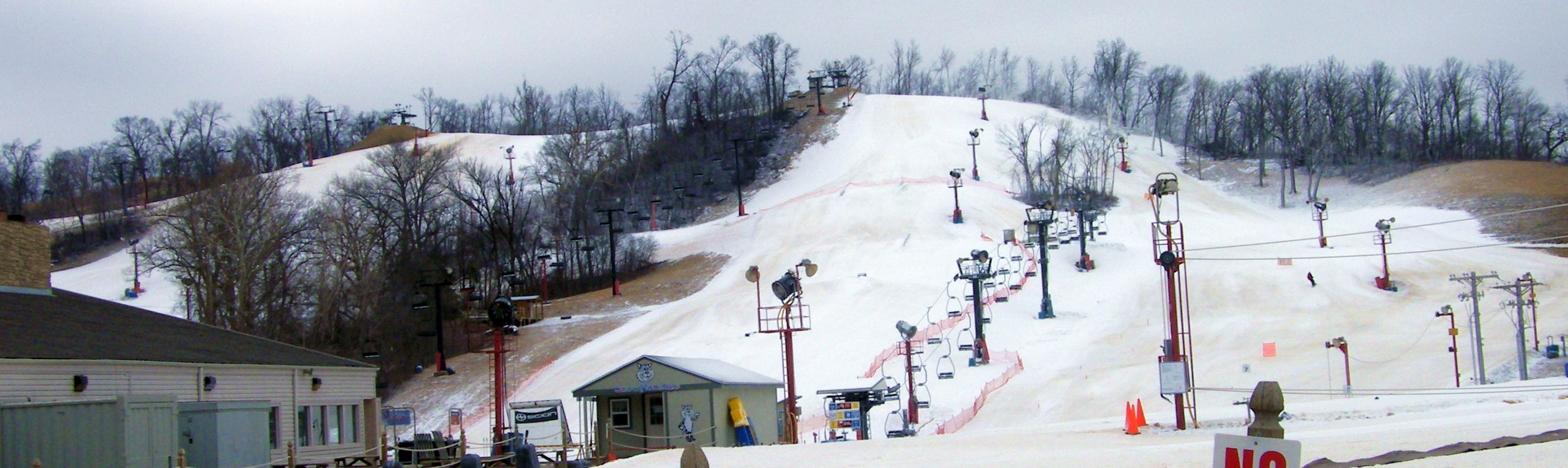
- Snow Creek in 2009

- Location within Missouri
- Location: Weston, Missouri, U.S.
- Coordinates: 39.468651°N 94.971964°W
- Vertical: 300 ft (91 m)
- Skiable area: 25 acres (10 ha)
- Trails: 12
- Lift system: 3 chairs, 2 surface lifts
- Terrain parks: 2
- Snowmaking: Yes
- Website: Skisnowcreek.com

Snow Creek is a ski resort on the bluffs above the Missouri River in Marshall Township, Platte County, northwest of Kansas City, Missouri, near the village of Iatan. it opened in 1986 and was the second resort to be developed in the Peak Resorts chain.

Overlooking Kansas across the river, the resort plays on its Midwest heritage including a Tornado Alley tubing trail. A tornado touched ground at the resort at 7:30 p.m. on April 30, 2003 in part of the May 2003 tornado outbreak sequence. The tornado did minimal damage and nobody was injured.

The lift elevation is 1,099 feet (335 m) and the vertical drop is 300 feet (91 m). It has 3 chair lifts and 3 surface lifts, 11 trails including 1 advanced and 2 easy. It comprises 25 acres (100,000 m^{2}) and its mailing address is Weston, Missouri.

in 2019, Snow Creek was purchased by Colorado based Vail Resorts as a part of a $263 million deal.
