= Jack Frost–Big Boulder Ski Resort =

Ski area in Pennsylvania, United States

Coordinates: 41.111°N 75.652°W

Jack Frost–Big Boulder
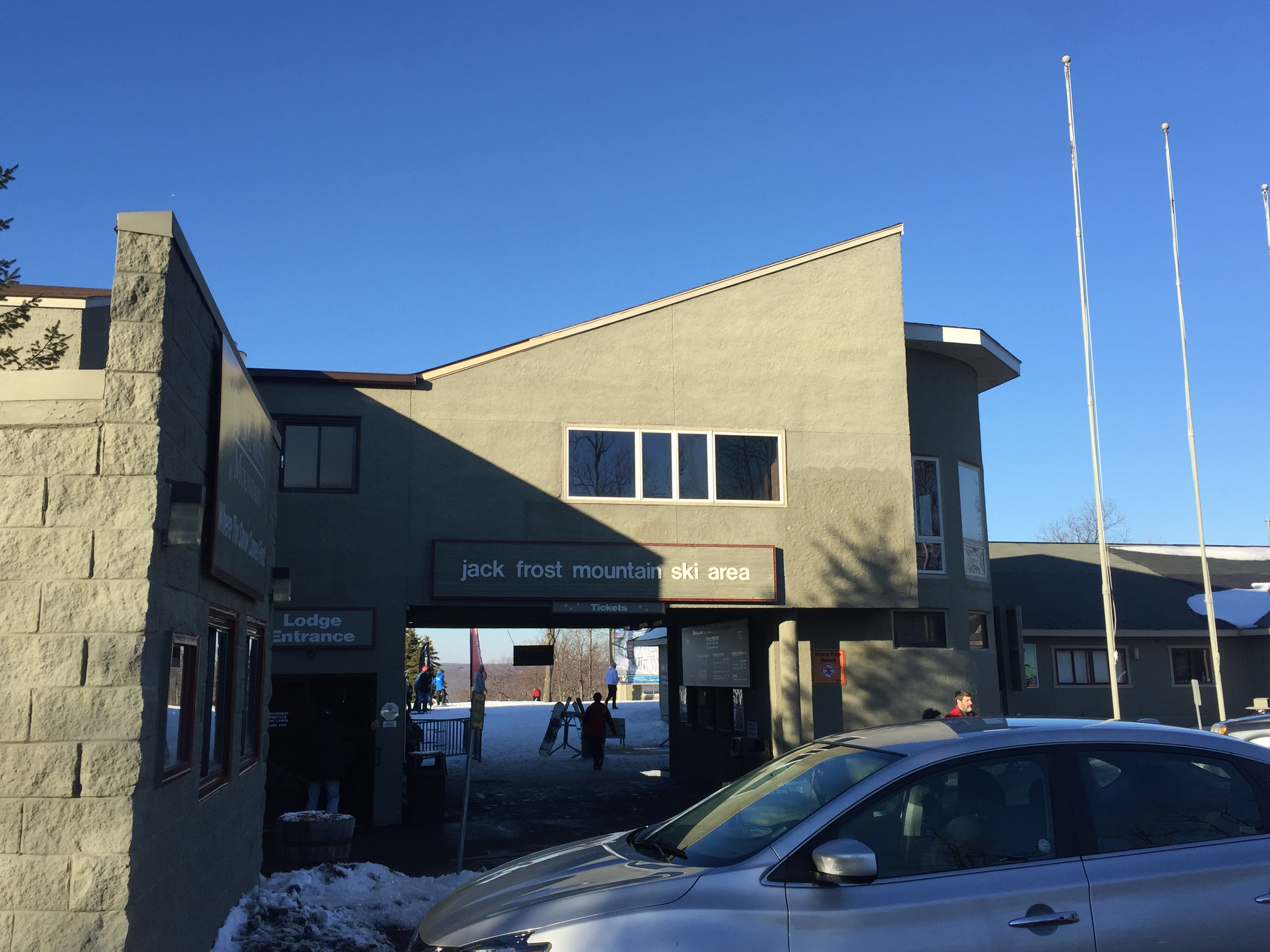
- Jack Frost Big Ski Resort's main lodge in January 2017
- Interactive map of Jack Frost–Big Boulder
- Location: Kidder Township, Pennsylvania, U.S.
- Nearest city: Allentown, New York City, Philadelphia
- Status: Operating
- Owner: Vail Resorts
- Vertical: 475 ft (145 m) (Big Boulder), 600 ft (180 m) (Jack Frost)
- Top elevation: 2,175 ft (663 m) (Big Boulder), 2,000 ft (610 m) (Jack Frost)
- Base elevation: 1,700 ft (520 m) (Big Boulder), 1,400 ft (430 m) (Jack Frost)
- Trails: 18 (Big Boulder), 20 (Jack Frost)
- Lift system: Big Boulder: 7 (2 quad, 1 triple, 1 double, 3 surface); Jack Frost: 9 (4 quads, 2 doubles, 3 surface)
- Terrain parks: Yes, 2 (Big Boulder), 1 (Jack Frost)
- Snowmaking: Yes
- Night skiing: Yes
- Website: https://www.jfbb.com

Jack Frost–Big Boulder is a resort with two separate ski areas. It is located in Kidder Township, Pennsylvania, in the Pocono Mountains region of Northeastern Pennsylvania. In 2019, the resort, which had been owned and operated by Peak Resorts, was purchased by Vail Resorts.

== Big Boulder ==
Big Boulder opened in 1947, and employee John Guresh is credited with developing the first usable snow making equipment while working there in the 1950s. Big Boulder resort has three main parks, Big Boulder Park, Freedom Park, and LOVE Park, inspired by Philadelphia's LOVE Park a popular destination for skateboarders.

During the 2020–21 ski season, Vail made the decision to considerably reduce the number of terrain parks at Big Boulder and market the mountain as a learning hill. This may be a temporary COVID-19 pandemic-related change or a permanent restructuring of Big Boulder's trail composition. The resort has two lodges, the main lodge, which is located at the bottom of the mountain and can be seen from the parking lot. Inside there are cafes and other services for the snowboarders and skiers. The other lodge, located at the bottom of Big Boulder Park, is called the lower lodge. The lower lodge includes an outdoor grill, a bar a pro shop, and the entire lodge is sponsored by Red Bull Energy Drink.

== Jack Frost ==
The owners of Big Boulder built Jack Frost with a longer runs and a higher vertical drop, going down to the level of the Lehigh River, rather than up to a ridge top.

== Ecology ==
=== Jack Frost Ski Resort ===
According to the A. W. Kuchler U.S. potential natural vegetation types, Jack Frost Ski Resort would have a dominant vegetation type of Northern Hardwood's (106) with a dominant vegetation form of Northern hardwood forest (23). The plant hardiness zone is 5b with an average annual extreme minimum air temperature of −14.6 °F (−25.9 °C). The spring bloom typically begins around April 30 and fall color usually peaks before October 11.

=== Big Boulder Ski Resort ===
According to the A. W. Kuchler U.S. potential natural vegetation types, Big Boulder Ski Resort would have a dominant vegetation type of Northern Hardwood (106) with a dominant vegetation form of Northern hardwood forest (23). The plant hardiness zone is 6a with an average annual extreme minimum air temperature of −9.4 °F (−23.0 °C). The spring bloom typically begins around April 30 and fall color usually peaks before October 13.

== Recreation ==
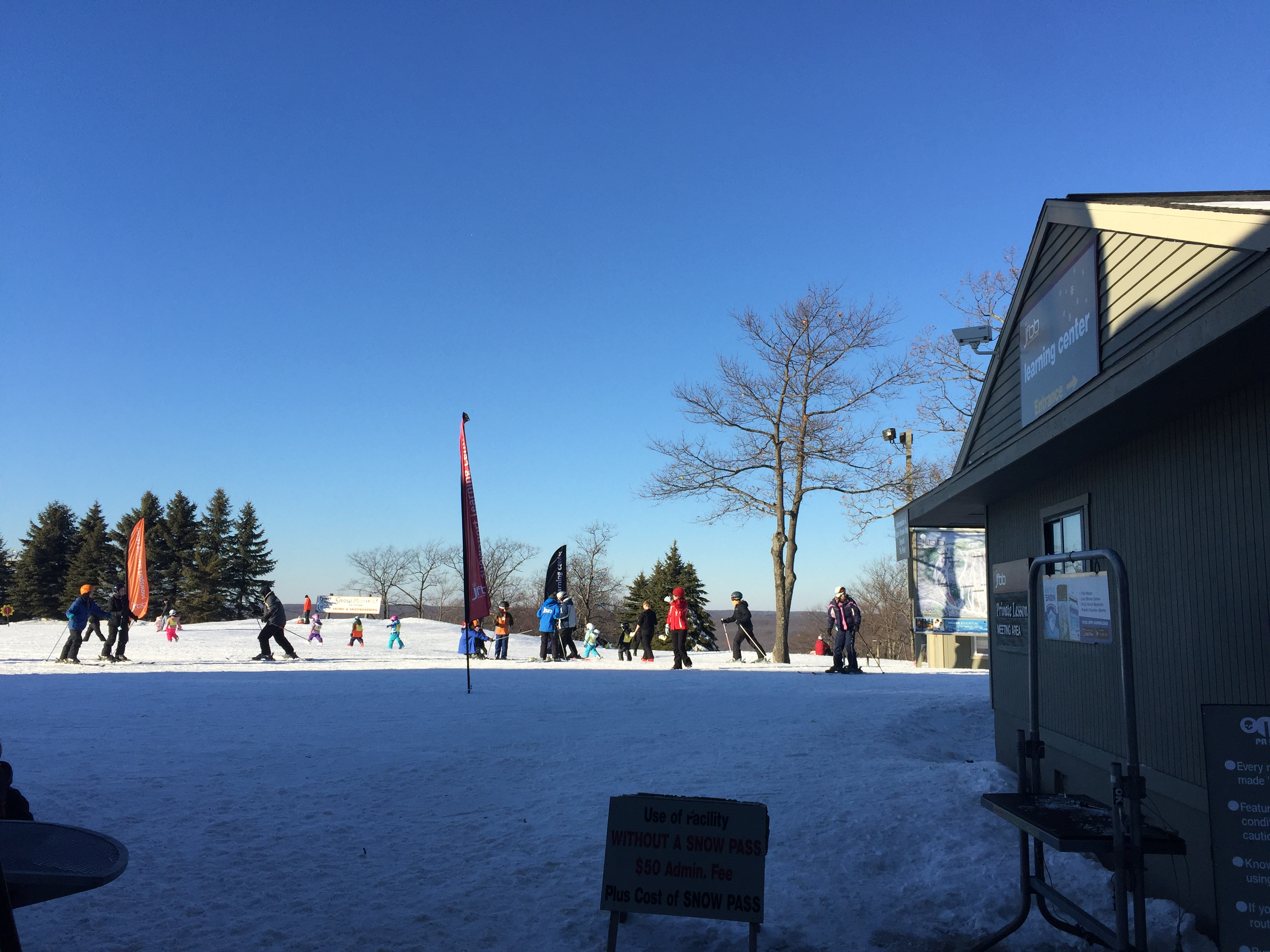
The ski area

In 2006, warm weather resulted in issues for local skiers, but was able to stay open with snow reserves made in December.

The resort was able to open one week earlier due to an aggressive snow season.

Jack Frost is a major tourist destination and attraction in the region and has caused an influx of new home buyers. Home buyers have cited the ski resort, golf courses, and distance from New York City and Philadelphia as factors for purchasing local properties.
