= Boston Mills/Brandywine Ski Resorts =

Ski area in Ohio, United States

Boston Mills/Brandywine
- Interactive map of Boston Mills/Brandywine
- Location: Boston Township / Sagamore Hills Township, Summit County, near Peninsula, Ohio, USA
- Nearest city: Akron, Ohio
- Coordinates: 41.2648°N 81.5644°W (Boston Mills); 41.2849°N 81.5517°W (Brandywine)
- Status: Operating
- Owner: EPR Properties
- Vertical: 240 ft (73 m)
- Skiable area: 79 acres (32 ha)
- Trails: 18
- Longest run: Buttermilk (BM) / Outer Limits (BW)
- Lift system: 15
- Terrain parks: Yes, 3
- Snowmaking: Yes, 100%
- Night skiing: Yes
- Website: bmbw.com

Boston Mills/Brandywine Ski Resorts are a pair of sister ski resorts in Peninsula, Northeast Ohio. Established in 1963 independently, the resorts are currently owned by EPR Properties and operated by Vail Resorts. Combined, the resorts contain 18 trails and 11 chairlifts. The Boston Mills Resort features Ohio's steepest slope, and the Brandywine Resort is home to Ohio's largest tubing park.

== History ==
The two locations, Boston Mills Ski Resort and Brandywine Ski Resort, developed independently in 1963 as competitors. Brandywine was purchased by the owners of Boston Mills in 1990, forming the dual-resort complex known today. In 2002, Peak Resorts purchased the resorts and operated them until new ownership. In 2019, Vail Resorts acquired Boston Mills and Brandywine as well as Peak Resorts' 15 other ski resorts and facilities.

Location of Boston Mills/Brandywine Ski Resorts

Soon after new ownership, the ski resorts were forced to close due to the COVID-19 pandemic. Boston Mills and Brandywine closed on March 14, 2020, which was supposed to be the last day of the 2019–2020 season. This decision was made when confirmed COVID-19 cases in Ohio reached 26 for the first time, with Governor Mike DeWine banning mass gatherings earlier in the week. In the 2020–2021 season, there were new safety measures and actions taken by Boston Mills and Brandywine to operate safely amidst the pandemic. Also, Vail Resorts added an insurance feature to the Epic Pass called Epic Coverage, which provided refunds if the resort closed due to COVID-19 and other unexpected events.

In 2022, the ski resorts experienced a staff shortage, which was said to be largely caused by COVID-19 and the relatively low wage of $11.25 an hour, resulting in only the Boston Mills location to be open at the start of an already delayed season. Many local skiers expressed displeasure toward the management and operations of Boston Mills and Brandywine, with complaints being long lines fueled by limited operating hours, lack of employees to operate the ski lifts, and increased Epic Pass sales. In response to public discontent from the previous year and as an effort to improve the guest experience, Vail Resorts introduced new policies and investments. For example, the starting pay increased to $20 an hour to resolve the staffing shortage.

== Geography ==
Boston Mills/Brandywine Ski Resorts are located in Peninsula, Northeast Ohio. The two resorts are both within Cuyahoga Valley National Park and about two miles apart. By car, it takes around five minutes to get from one resort to the other.

== Features ==
Boston Mills and Brandywine together provide a total of 18 trails, equipped with 4 quad chairlifts, 6 triple chairlifts, and 1 double chairlift. Combined, they have a lift capacity of 20,000 per hour.

=== Boston Mills Resort ===
- The "Tiger" run at Boston Mills is the steepest slope in the state of Ohio.
- Boston Mills hosts annual Winter Carnivals, with traditions such as the Slosh Pit, other races, and a costume contest.
- For the 2022–2023 season, the Boston Mills Resort invested in the Buena Vista, which is a fixed-grip quad chairlift that replaced the Lift 5 double chairlift.

Trails
Easier	More Difficult	Most Difficult	Terrain Parks
Summit	Buttermilk	Croyle	Peter's Pride
	Jug Handle	North Bowl	
		Tiger	

Lifts
Lift	Lift Type
Buena Vista	Quad Chairlift
Carpet Lift	Carpet Lift
Lift 1	Double Chairlift
Lift 2	Triple Chairlift
Lift 3	Triple Chairlift
Lift 4	Triple Chairlift
Lift 6	Triple Chairlift

=== Brandywine Resort ===
- Polar Blast, Northeast Ohio's largest tubing park, is featured at Brandywine. There are multiple lanes and a two-lane conveyor belt for tubers.
- For the 2022–2023 season, the Brandywine Resort invested in the Ram Quad, which is a fixed-grip quad chairlift that replaced the Lift 3 triple chairlift.

Trails
Easier	More Difficult	Most Difficult	Terrain Parks
Easy Rider	Down Draft	Champagne	Progression Park
Frosty	Outer Limits	Grizzly	The Park
J's Rider	Shredder	Regulator Johnson	

Lifts
Lift	Lift Type
Carpet Lift	Carpet Lift
Handle Tow	Handle Tow
Lift 1	Quad Chairlift
Lift 2	Quad Chairlift
Lift 4	Triple Chairlift
Lift 5	Triple Chairlift
Ram Quad	Quad Chairlift
Tubing Carpet Lift	Carpet Lift
