= Perfect North Slopes =

Ski area in Indiana, United States

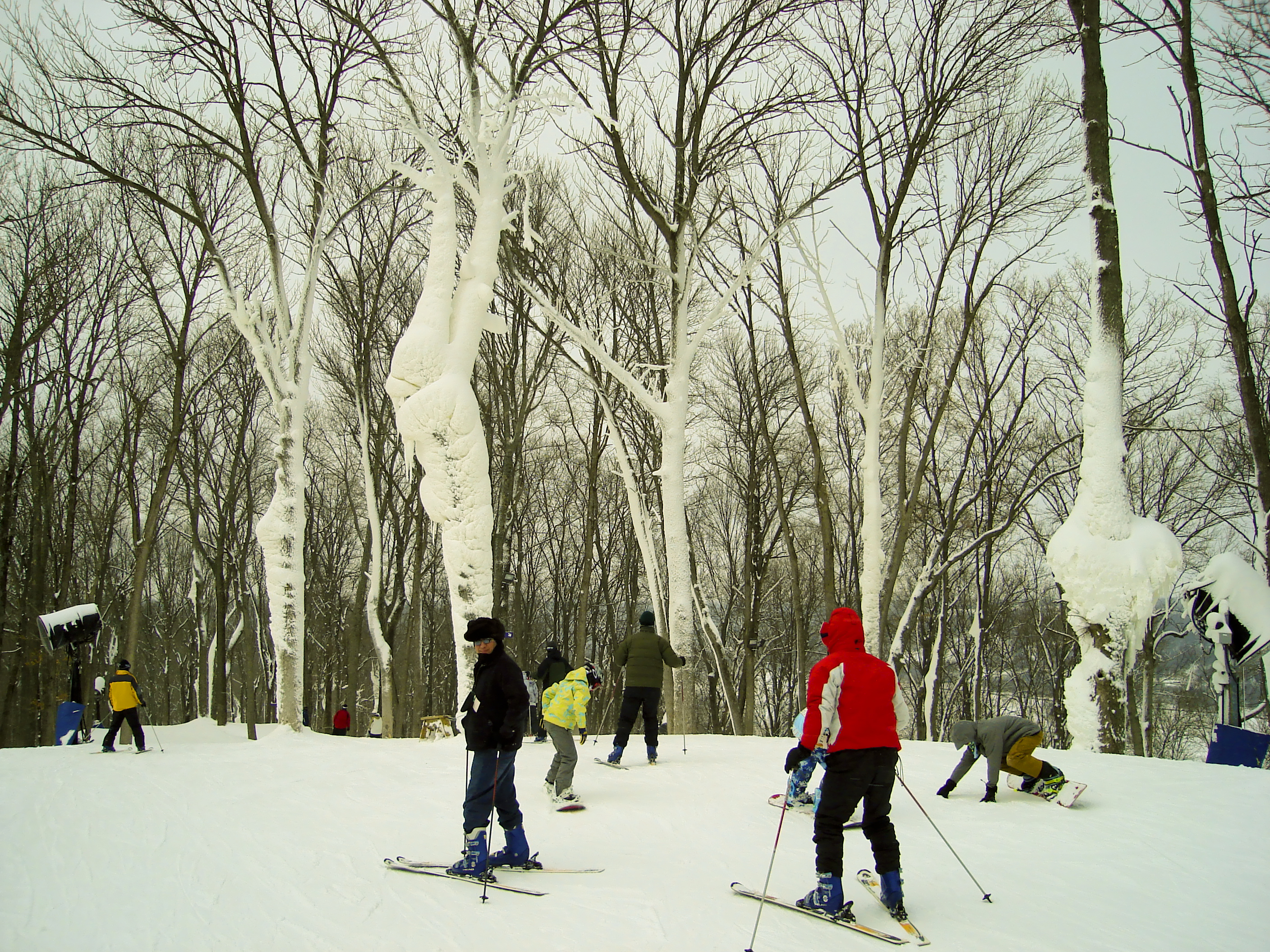
- One blue square rated trail at Perfect North Slopes called "Runway"
- Interactive map of Perfect North Slopes
- Location: 19074 Perfect Pl Ln, Lawrenceberg, IN 47025
- Nearest city: Lawrenceburg, Indiana
- Coordinates: 39.149208°N 84.886581°W
- Status: Open
- Vertical: 400 ft (120 m)
- Top elevation: 800 ft (240 m)
- Base elevation: 400 ft (120 m)
- Skiable area: 100 acres (40 ha)
- Trails: 23 total 5 beginner 10 intermediate 1 advanced intermediate 4 advanced 1 expert 2 terrain parks
- Longest run: The Far Side 0.56 mi (0.90 km)
- Lift system: 13 total (3 quad chairs, 2 triple chairs, 8 surface)
- Terrain parks: 2
- Snowfall: 23 in (58 cm)
- Snowmaking: Yes
- Night skiing: Yes
- Website: www.perfectnorth.com

Perfect North Slopes is an alpine ski area in Lawrenceburg, IN. Officially outside the city limits, it is one of only two skiing areas in Indiana. It consists of seven carpet lifts and five chairlifts, as well as two tubing carpets. The area has 23 trails, ranging from five beginner level to one expert, and includes three terrain parks.

== Resort history ==
Perfect North Slopes was formed by the Perfect family and others in 1980 on the land of their 200-acre farm. Initially funded by the sale of cattle by Clyde & Ella Mae Perfect, it began with two handle tows and a rope tow on two ski runs on the "big" hill, as well as two rope tows on the bunny slope. In 1984, a chair was added where the "big" rope tow was, and another chair was added in 1985. In 1987, Perfect North installed a third chairlift, which added one blue square and two black diamond ski runs. Eventually, they added two more chairs, which opened up 4 new ski runs.

In 1989, Perfect North permitted snowboarding but bad attitudes and rude manners caused a decade-long ban lasting until 2002. This meant that they were very late compared to other American locations in allowing snowboarders. Three American ski areas, however, still prohibit snowboarders today.

In 2006, an avalanche occurred on Center stage. It was found to be extremely unusual as the event unfolded in the Midwest United States, with entirely artificial snow, and slid on bare ground. Images show that the lift towers were tilted from the damage. Due to high levels of heat causing melting, a large and heavy snow/ice sheet broke off on the steepest section hitting the supports.

On November 20, 2019, Perfect North purchased the land and assets of Timberline Four Seasons Resort in a Philadelphia bankruptcy court for $2,200,000. The Timberline resort is on the eastern slope of the Canaan Valley near Davis, West Virginia. Timberline, and the nearby Cannan Valley Ski Resort, receives outsized amounts of snow in contrast to the surrounding areas. Timberline had fallen into disrepair over the previous several years, suffering sporadic broken lifts and other infrastructure problems. A new management team revitalized the operation for the 2020–2021 ski season.

In 2019 Perfect North Slopes also acquired the Swiss Valley family ski resort in Michigan, but did not release the information until 2025.

The company also renovated and started operating First Tracks at Ski Train Depot (an ice cream and coffee shop) though the date when they did it was not given.

In 2022 a new half mile (0.804672 kilometer) trail, Ella Mae Way, was added on the eastern (skiers right) side of the slopes. This trail was named after one of the founders Ella Mae Perfect. Then in 2023, the Red Chair was replaced by a new Skytrac Quad Chairlift along with a new RFID system for passes and lift tickets. In the 2024–25 season they replaced Jam Session terrain park with another to the left of Ella Mae Way and a beginner terrain park below it. They also added multiple snow blowers with generators being able to pump 15,000 gallons per minute.

Perfect North is where the notable Olympic freestyle skier Nick Goepper got his start. Growing up about 15 minutes from the slopes, Goepper used to spend up to 12 hours a day training at Perfect North before he began his trek to stardom and he eventually competed in the Winter Olympic Games in Sochi, Russia. Four years later, in Pyeongchang, South Korea, Goepper excitedly asked "What's up, Perfect North?" to the camera after his first qualifying run in the slopestyle competition, scoring a 92.80.

== Activities ==
The Perfect North Slopes lodge has 3 sections: east, west, and main. The west lodge is the original lodge. The main lodge and the East Lodge are later additions. The first story of the main lodge has a small cafeteria. On the second story of the east lodge, there is a small skiing and snowboarding shop. Adjacent to the main ski area is a 750-foot (230 m) tubing run.

== See also ==
- List of ski areas and resorts in the United States
- Paoli Peaks
