= Northstar California =

Ski resort in California, United States

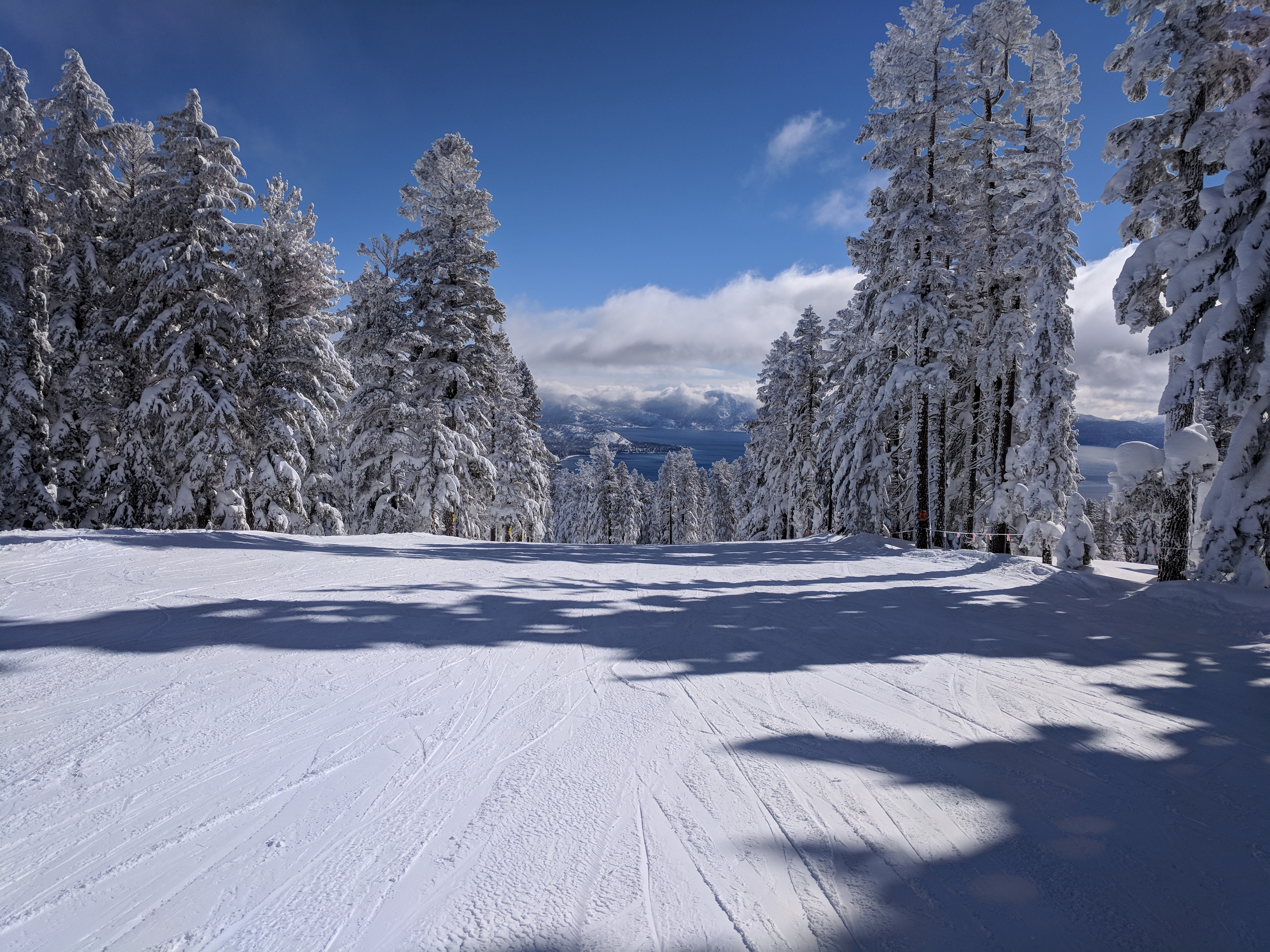
- The East Ridge of Northstar California, with a view of the north shore of Lake Tahoe. Taken from near the summit of Mt. Pluto.

- Location in California Northstar California (the United States)
- Location: Placer County, California
- Nearest city: Truckee
- Coordinates: 39.264°N 120.125°W
- Status: Operating
- Owner: Vail Resorts
- Vertical: 2,280 ft (690 m)
- Top elevation: 8,610 ft (2,620 m)
- Base elevation: 6,330 ft (1,930 m)
- Skiable area: 3,170 acres (12.8 km^{2})
- Trails: 100 total 13% beginner 60% intermediate 27% advanced
- Longest run: 1.4 mi (2.3 km)
- Lift system: 20 lifts
- Lift capacity: 34,800 / hr
- Terrain parks: Yes, 5
- Snowfall: 350 in (890 cm)
- Snowmaking: Yes, 50%
- Night skiing: No
- Website: northstarcalifornia.com

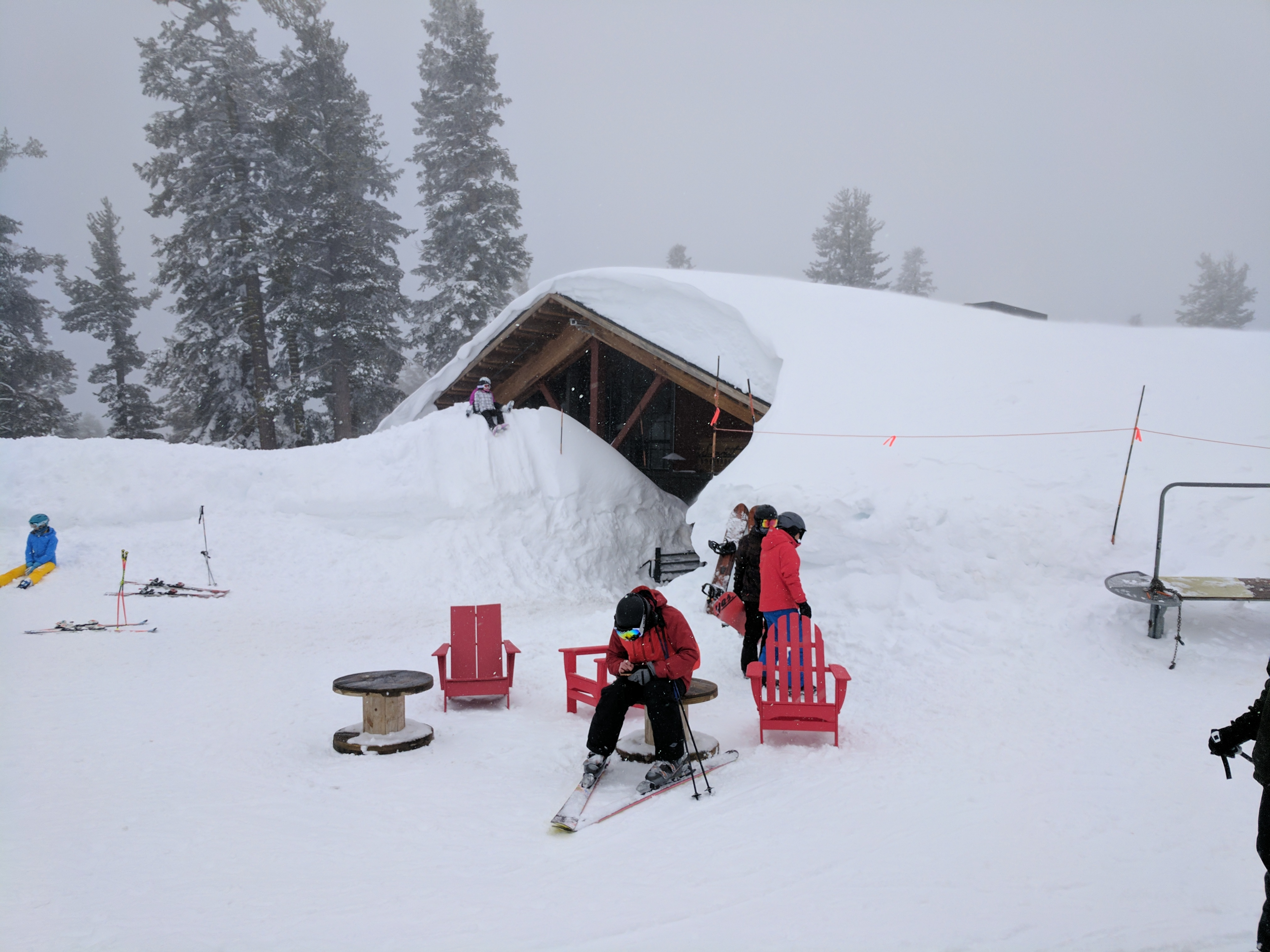
The Summit Smokehouse, at the peak of Mt. Pluto, nearly snowed in, in 2017.

Northstar California (previously Northstar-at-Tahoe) is a mountain resort in the western United States, located in Placer County, California, near the northwest shore of Lake Tahoe.

Approximately 200 miles (320 km) from the San Francisco Bay Area, the 3,170-acre (12.8 km^{2}) resort features 2,280 ft (690 m) vertical drop of alpine terrain accessed by 19 lifts, a snowmaking system, a cross-country center, a village, on-site lodging and summer activities including an 18-hole golf course and a lift-served mountain bike park.

== History ==
Northstar was a former lumber site once owned by the Douglas Lumber Company of Truckee and was acquired by Fibreboard when they purchased Douglas in 1967. Its original name was Timber Farm, but was changed to Northstar-at-Tahoe when the mountain opened 54 years ago in December 1972. The first ski resort amenities included 5 chairlifts. The trails were designed by Luggi Foeger, an Austrian, who had fled Europe during World War II.

In 2007, CNL Lifestyle Properties acquired Northstar, which since 2010 has been operated under a triple-net lease by Vail Resorts. Vail also owns Heavenly Ski Resort and Kirkwood Mountain Resort both at Lake Tahoe, four other ski resorts in Colorado, including Vail, Breckenridge, Keystone, and Beaver Creek, and other ski resorts. Previously, Northstar had been owned by Booth Creek, a holdings company managed by George Nield Gillett Jr., the owner of the now defunct Gillett Holdings, a former owner of Vail Associates.

In 2016 EPR Properties agreed to purchase Northstar California in a package deal along with multiple other properties from CNL Lifestyle Properties for approximately $456 Million.

== Terrain ==
Northstar features 3,170 acres of terrain, with 60% of trails designated for intermediate skiers. Grooming on trails is well-established and offers many "groomers" for resort visitors. In 2015, Ski Magazine listed the resort as the 24th best ski area in the western United States. The resort has been consistently rated as having one of the top 10 terrain parks in North America. It features seven different terrain parks for all different skills levels across 55 acres of terrain. Northstar's terrain is serviced by a network of 19 lifts.

== Climate ==
According to resort sources, the annual snowfall at Northstar is 350 inches per year. Snow totals are measured at a windloaded spot near the base of the Rendezvous chair and are counted from the first snowfall until closing day each year.

Climate data for Northstar, California (1981–2010)
Month	Jan	Feb	Mar	Apr	May	Jun	Jul	Aug	Sep	Oct	Nov	Dec	Year
Mean daily maximum °F (°C)	37 (3)	39 (4)	44 (7)	51 (11)	59 (15)	69 (21)	78 (26)	77 (25)	70 (21)	59 (15)	46 (8)	36 (2)	55 (13)
Mean daily minimum °F (°C)	11 (−12)	13 (−11)	18 (−8)	23 (−5)	29 (−2)	35 (2)	40 (4)	38 (3)	31 (−1)	23 (−5)	18 (−8)	11 (−12)	24 (−5)
Average precipitation inches (mm)	9.8 (250)	9.0 (230)	8.0 (200)	4.0 (100)	2.5 (64)	0.8 (20)	0.2 (5.1)	0.5 (13)	0.8 (20)	2.8 (71)	5.2 (130)	5.7 (140)	49.3 (1,243.1)
Average snowfall inches (cm)	79 (200)	77 (200)	73 (190)	14 (36)	5 (13)	1 (2.5)	0 (0)	0 (0)	0 (0)	3 (7.6)	21 (53)	78 (200)	351 (902.1)
Source: https://www.onthesnow.com/california/northstar-california/historical-snowfall

View source data.

== Village ==
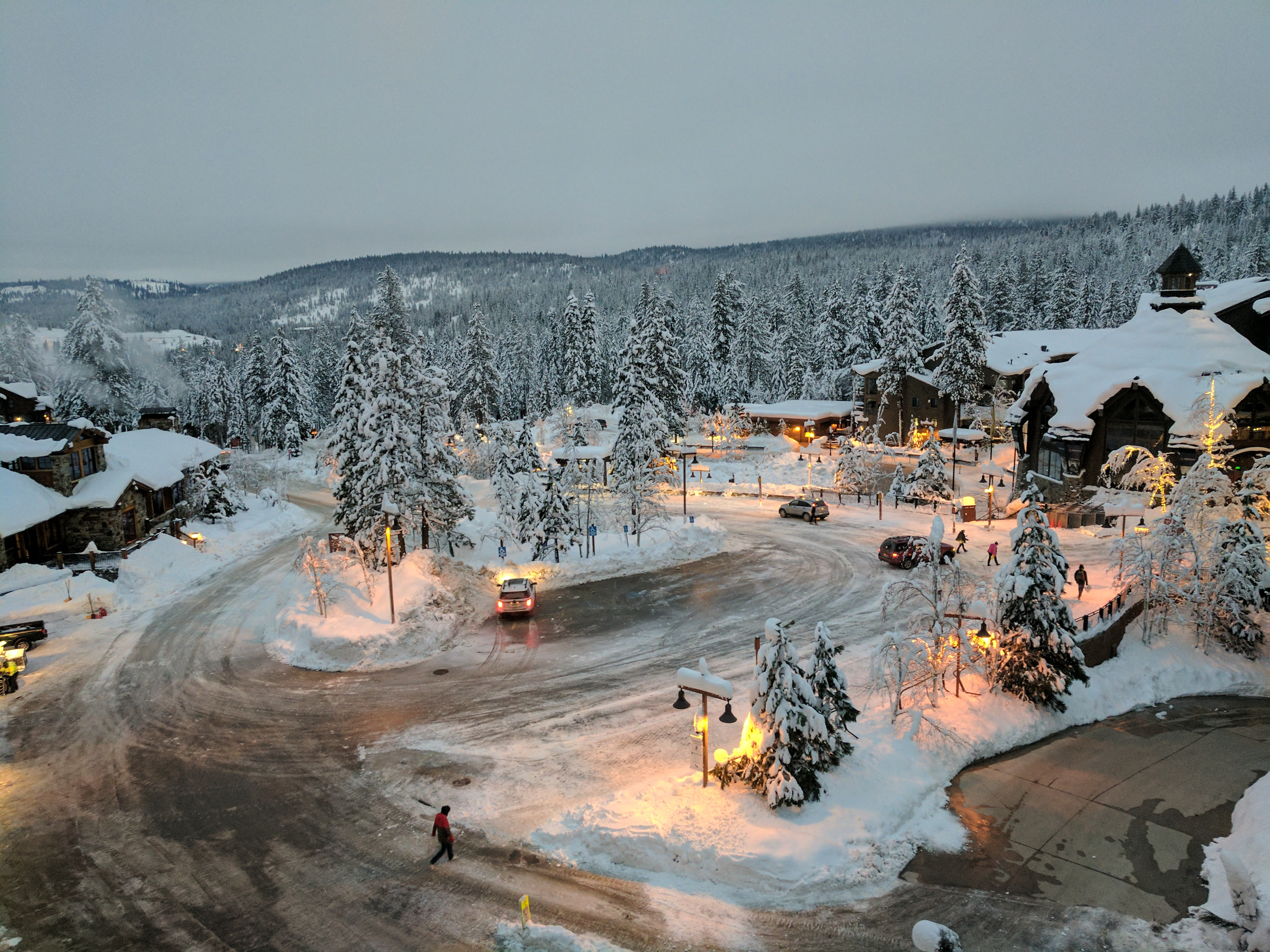
The Village Circle dropoff area at Northstar California, seen from the upper floor of the Lodge

Northstar Village is based on a small village layout that centers a square which, in winter, has an ice skating rink.

== Gallery ==
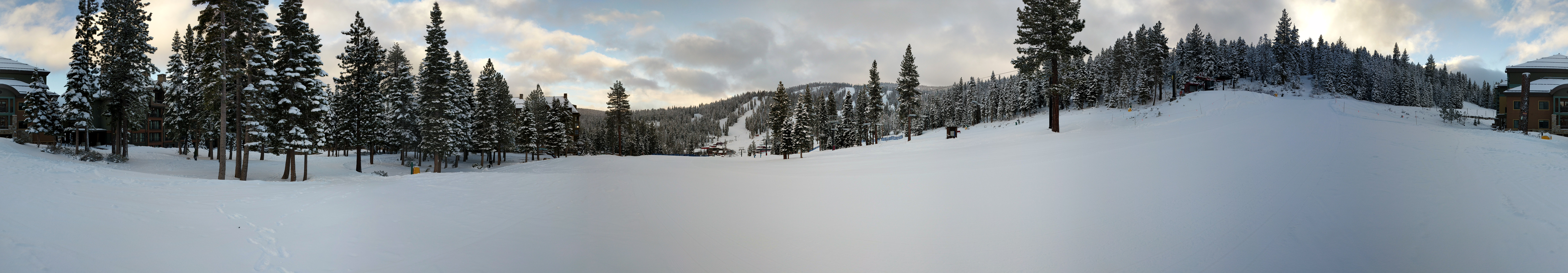
Panorama of "Lower Lion's Way" ski trail, just below the top of The Big Easy chairlift
