= Hidden Valley Ski Area =

Ski area in Missouri, United States

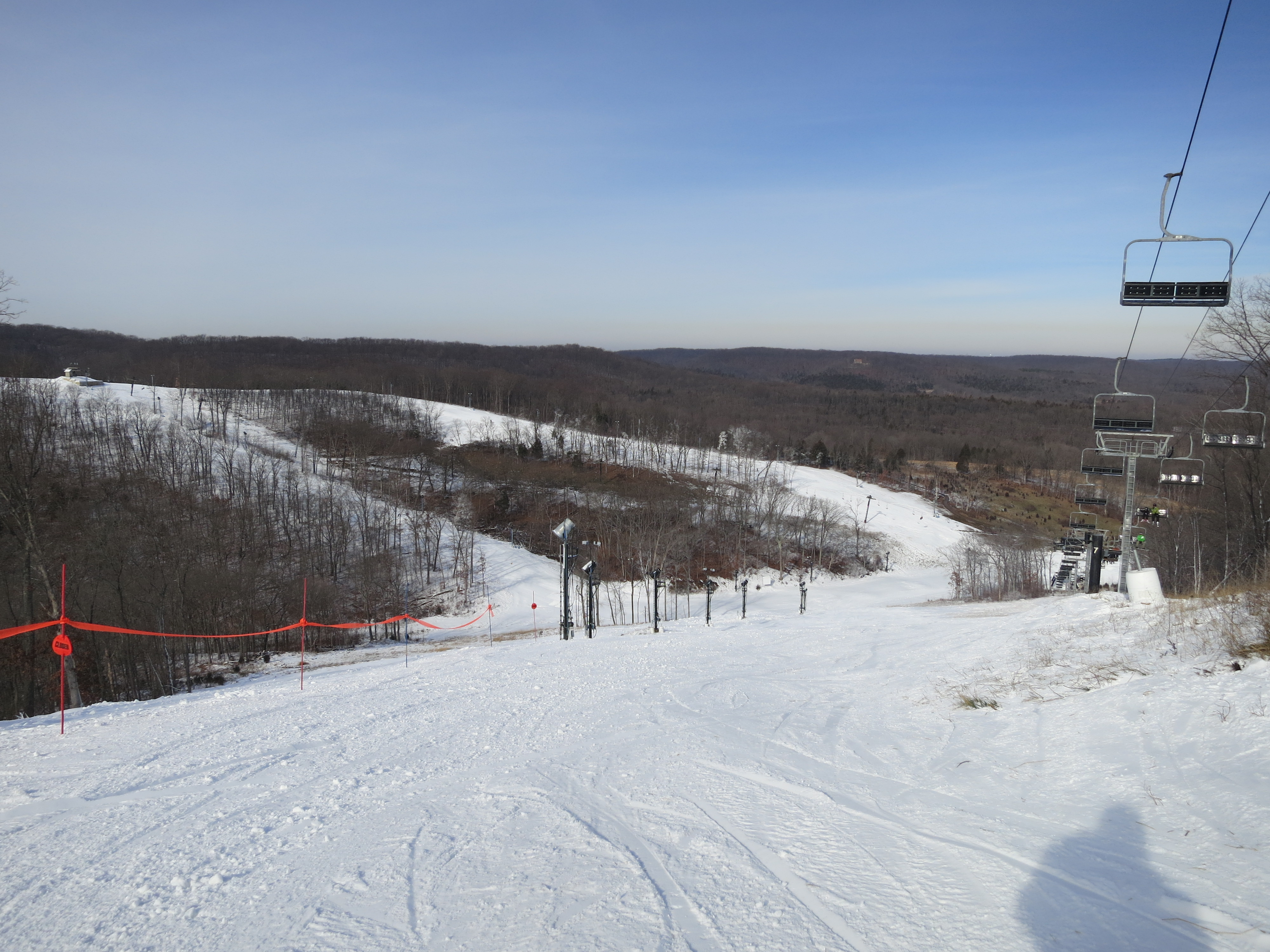

- Location within Missouri
- Location: Wildwood, Missouri, United States
- Coordinates: 38.535578°N 90.65287°W
- Status: Operating
- Opened: 1982
- Owner: Vail Resorts
- Vertical: 320 ft (98 m)
- Top elevation: 860 ft (262 m)
- Skiable area: 65 acres (26 ha)
- Trails: 16 total: 25% beginner; 33% intermediate; 19% advanced; 13% terrain parks
- Lift system: 5 chairlifts, 4 surface lifts
- Terrain parks: Yes, 2
- Snowmaking: Yes
- Night skiing: Yes
- Website: Hiddenvalleyski.com

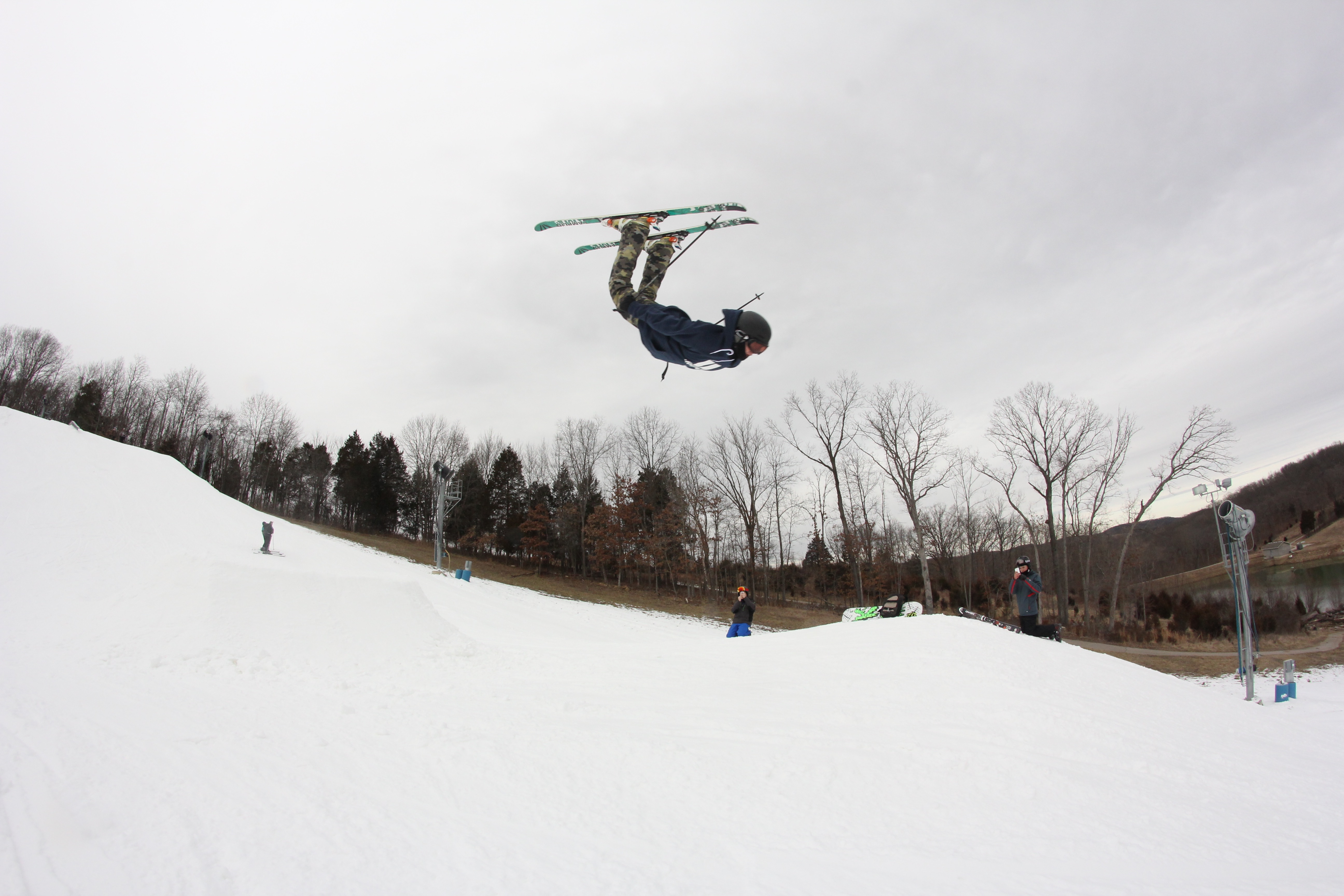
Skier experiences one of two of Hidden Valley Ski Area's terrain parks

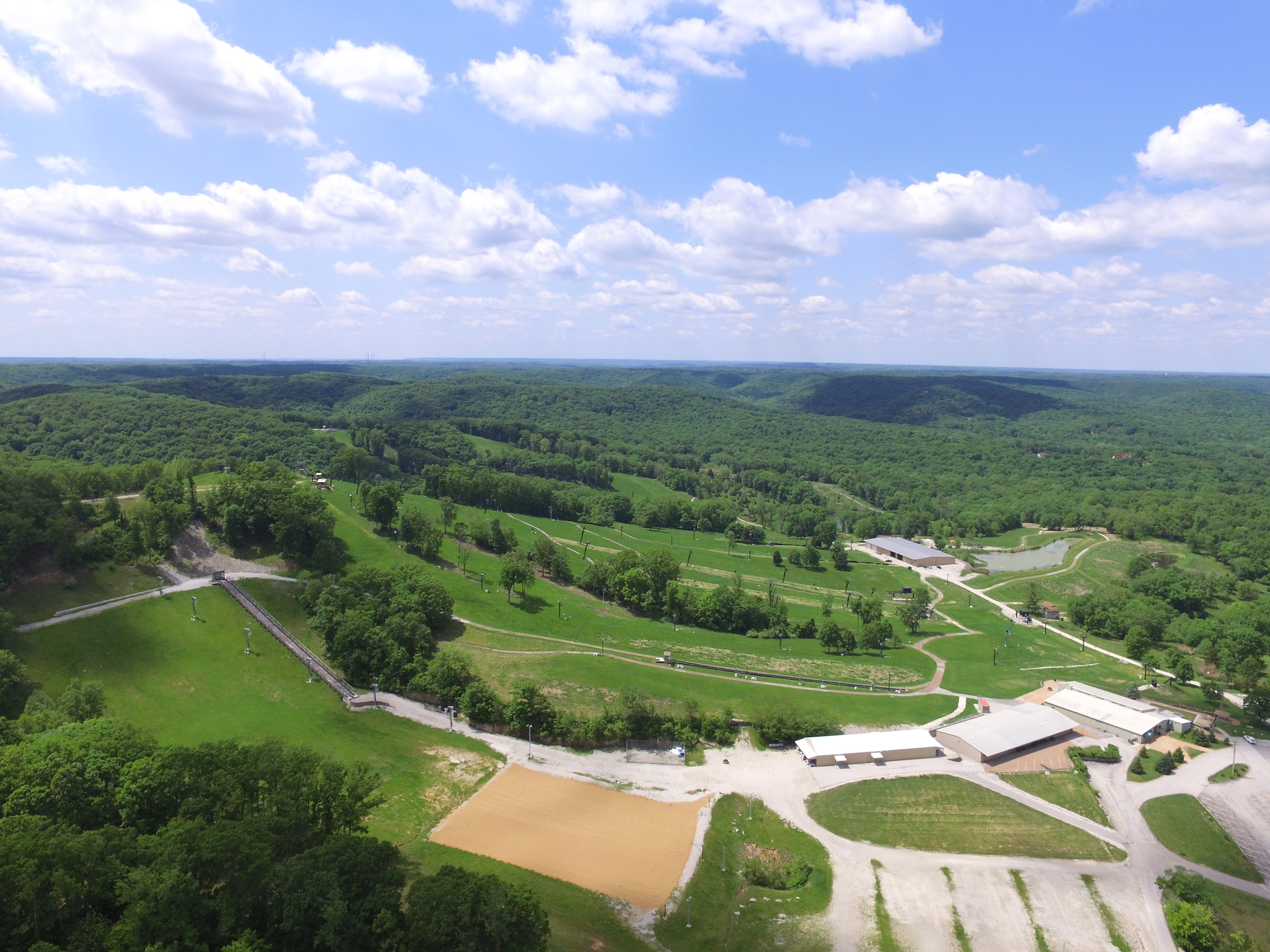
Hidden Valley Ski Resort - summer aerial drone photograph

Hidden Valley Ski Area is a ski resort in the St. Louis, Missouri suburb of Wildwood, Missouri.

The ski area consists of 15 trails on 65 acres (26 ha) of two different peaks to form a 320 ft vertical drop. All of these trails feature Snowmaking, with a capacity of 6600 gallons of water per minute.

== History ==
Glenn Boyd, Sr. and Tim Boyd bought the Wildwood Golf Course for $250,000 in 1977. In 1982 the family converted the hills to a ski resort while maintaining the golf course. The resort would be the first of several resorts throughout the Midwest and Northeast United States they developed or acquired through the company Peak Resorts.

Boyd ultimately entered an agreement to place the ski resort in a conservation easement in exchange for permission to build 80 homes on the golf property (which has since been closed).

At the beginning of the 2012–2013 season, Hidden Valley opened two additional runs on an adjacent hill. They dubbed this new area "West Mountain". With this expansion, one additional chair lift was added to allow access to these runs.

In January 2018, the City of Wildwood passed a vote to allow Hidden Valley to build a zip line tour which enabled the property to open year-round. The ZipTour opened in June 2019.

In 2019, Vail Resorts acquired previous owner Peak Resorts, putting the ski area under its ownership.

== Lifts ==
The trails are served by 9 lifts, 5 of which are chairlifts, the remaining 4 being surface lifts.

== See also ==
- List of ski areas and resorts in the United States
