= Alpine valley =

Alpine valley may refer to:

- Any valley of the Alps
- The Alpine Valleys wine region of Australia
- Alpine Valley Music Theatre, an amphitheater in East Troy, Wisconsin
- Alpine Valley Resort (Wisconsin), a ski resort located near Alpine Valley Music Theatre
- Alpine Valley Ski Area, a ski area in Ohio
- Vallis Alpes, a valley in the Montes Alpes on the Moon
