= Mount Brighton =

Ski area in Michigan, United States

Coordinates: 42°32′17″N 83°48′25″W

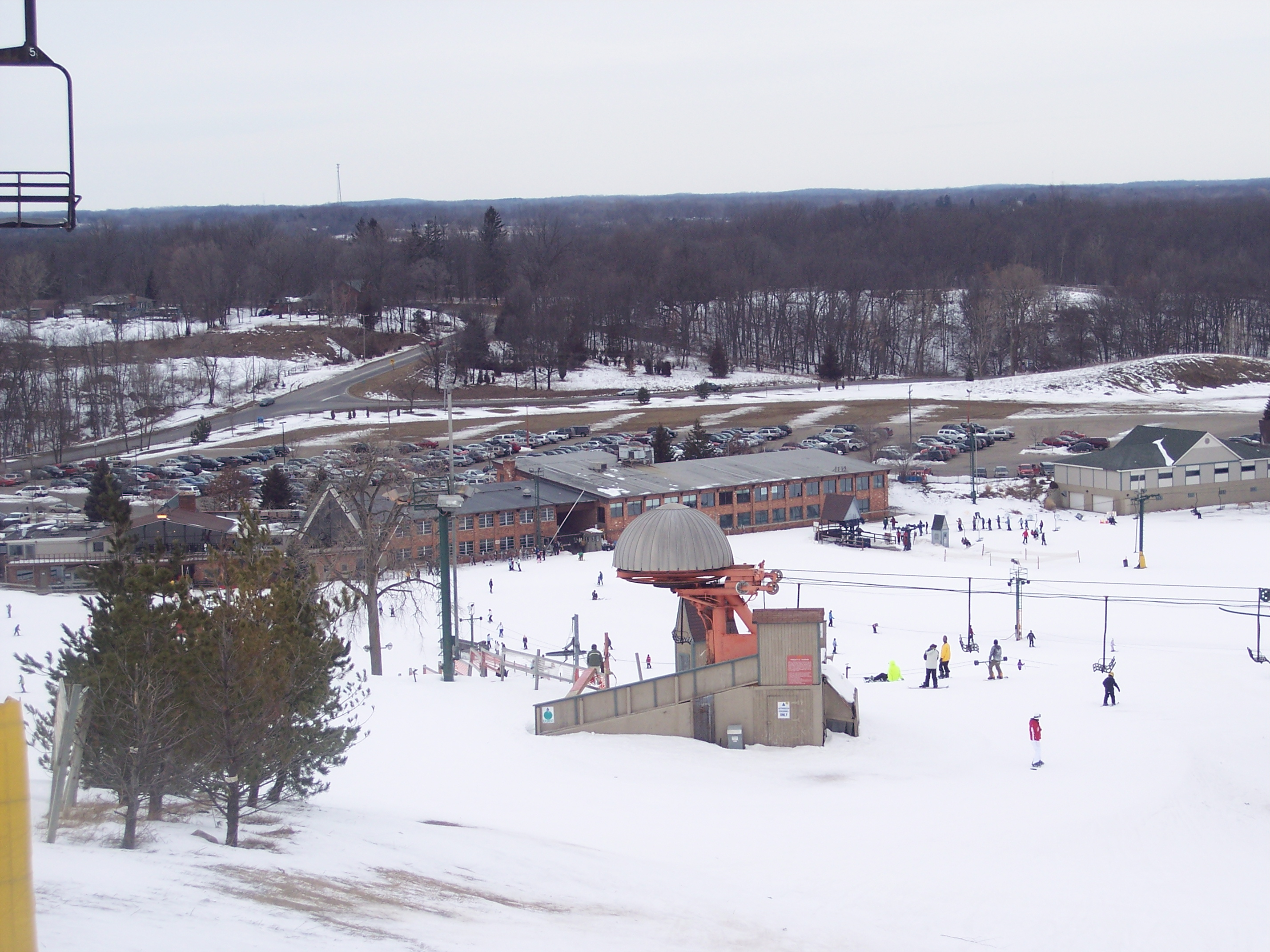
Modern-day Mt. Brighton in Brighton, Michigan, with original (and now defunct) orange chair in center of picture

Mt. Brighton is a ski and snowboard area in Brighton, Michigan, that opened in 1961. As no hills large enough for commercial skiing or snowboarding exist naturally in Brighton, Mt. Brighton's slopes are man-made and reach a maximum height of 230 vertical feet. Contrary to urban legend, Mt. Brighton was never a landfill. Mt. Brighton has 5 chairlifts and 7 surface lifts. Silver is the longest and newest of the 25 runs, running 1,350 feet. A terrain park, featuring rails, boxes, and jumps, is available to freestyle skiers and snowboarders. Almost all of the snow on Mt. Brighton is created artificially using water stored in an on-site reservoir and industry standard snowmaking equipment.

The resort was sold to Vail Resorts in December 2012.

== Trails and Runs ==
Mount Brighton offers 25 Trails and slopes to ride on. The beginner hills, Snowshoe, Larkspur, Bunny, and Flatiron are represented as a green circle on the map. The intermediate runs, Easy Street, Chicken Chute, Blue sky, Crosscut, Ryan's Run, Gasoline Alley, Sawtooth Ridge, Sidewinder, Thalackers, Wolverine Way, Spartan Street, and Jax Bowl are labeled as blue squares on the map. The advanced slopes, Golden Eagle, Osprey, Grand River, Big Risky, Cheetah, and Snyder's Escape are shown as a single black diamond on the map. The expert only hills, Challenge, and Perk's Folly are seen as two black diamonds on the slope map. The parts of runs with terrain parks are shown on the map as orange ovals.

== Stats and Amenities ==
Height, Base Elevation: 1,100 ft (335 m) Summit Elevation: 1,330 ft (405 m) Vertical Rise: 230 ft (70 m)

Total Area: 130 acres

Trails and slopes: 25 30% beginner 40% intermediate 30% advanced/expert

5 chairlifts, 7 surface lifts, Uphill Capacity per Hour: 17,200 people.

Snowmaking: 130 acres.

Dining at Ore Creek Mountain Grill for casual table service and Ski Hill Grill for quick serve. 2 Bars

== Groups and clubs ==
Mt. Brighton's Snowsports Academy offers ski and snowboard lessons to groups and individuals, and offers specialized programs for children (skiing and snowboarding) as well as ski racing. The Snowsports Staff is made up of highly trained instructors—many of whom are AASI (American Association of Snowboard Instructors) or PSIA (Professional Ski Instructors of America) certified. "Ski and Snowboard Club" is a popular activity for suburban and metro Detroit elementary and high school students who want to learn to ski or snowboard, and Mt. Brighton provides lessons to many of these groups. National Ski Patrol certified staff and volunteers provide education and training in leadership, outdoor emergency care, safety and transportation services. XLR8 alpine Racing also calls Mt. Brighton their home. They teach young skiers how to race.

NASTAR (NAtional STAndard Race) racing is available to the public as well as Epic Race, Saturdays and Sundays, allowing racers to compare their race results to other NASTAR competitors. There are additional events held throughout the season, including a New Year's Eve party, Rail Jams, and numerous ski races.

== The Golf Club at Mt. Brighton ==
The Golf Club at Mt. Brighton is an 18-hole golf course that was added to Mt. Brighton in 2001. Bruce Matthews designed the par 71 course with four sets of tees ranging in yardage from 6,655 to 4,826. This was then closed in July 2020.

== Aspen Extreme ==
Mt. Brighton made a national appearance in the 1993 feature-length film, "Aspen Extreme." The movie was filmed on location at Mt. Brighton and also in Aspen, Colorado. The main character, T.J. Burke (played by Paul Gross), walks onto Mt. Brighton in late Fall at the start of the movie. Burke hikes up the Black run to the top of the Red, Black and Silver chairlifts where Dexter Rutecki (Peter Berg) is welding a two-person chair that belonged to the Blue chairlift. The Blue, Green and Yellow chairlifts are on the second peak at Mt. Brighton, which is clearly visible in the background. Throughout the movie, Rutecki wears an orange hat created for the movie, but is mistakenly believed to be the official hat of the Mt. Brighton maintenance department employees. The movie indicates that Mt. Brighton was built on top of an existing land fill, which is somewhat misleading. Mt. Brighton was created with excess road debris from the construction of Interstate 96 and US 23, which could also be considered land fill, not with garbage.

The owners of Mt. Brighton were the Bruhn family, who also managed the golf course during the summer.
