= Paoli Peaks =

Ski area in Indiana, United States

- Interactive map of Paoli Peaks
- Location: Paoli Township, Orange County, Indiana, U.S. (United States)
- Nearest city: Paoli, Indiana
- Coordinates: 38°33′28″N 86°30′37″W
- Vertical: 300 ft (91 m)
- Trails: 15: 25% beginner; 55% intermediate; 20% advanced
- Lift system: 5 chairs: 1 quad, 3 triples, 1 double 3 surface lifts: 1 rope, 2 carpets
- Lift capacity: 11,200 passengers/hr
- Terrain parks: 2
- Snowfall: 25 in (64 cm)
- Snowmaking: Yes
- Night skiing: Yes
- Website: www.paolipeaks.com

Paoli Peaks is an alpine ski resort located in Paoli Township, Orange County, near Paoli, Indiana. Paoli Peaks is for skiers, snowboarders, snowbladers, and tubers (with the addition of their tubing hill in the 2006–2007 season).

Paoli Peaks is built on a natural hill at a 900 ft (270 m). elevation with a vertical drop of 300 ft (91 m). Currently, it has 17 runs and many chairlifts and tows. Though not in an extremely cold environment, Paoli Peaks uses its snow making capabilities to ensure plenty of snow for visitors.

It is owned and operated by Vail Resorts and is just north of Hoosier National Forest.

== Facilities ==
Paoli Peaks has a 45,000 square foot day lodge on top of the hill. It contains a cafeteria-style restaurant & pizzeria, a bar separate from the main eating area, ski & snowboard rental shop, pro shop, ski patrol first aid facility, ticket sales office, ski/ride school; and group sales office. Paoli Peaks is a day lodge only; there are no accommodations within the ski area, however, there are many hotels and resorts nearby.

The snow tubing hill is a short drive away from the Peak. It has up to 10 lanes of snow-covered 700-foot-long slopes, and a 400-foot "Wonder-Carpet" designed to get riders back up the hill, and day lodge.

Beginners and children can take lessons from ski instructors at the beginner's slopes. Paoli Peaks also has a ski patrol (part of the National Ski Patrol System). It consists primarily of volunteers who work with a small number of paid patrollers, internally referred to as the "Pro Patrol". Paoli Peaks Ski Patrol has approximately 85 members who have completed the National Ski Patrol's Outdoor Emergency Care course, and per the requirements of the National Ski Patrol refresh their skills annually. They come from a large geographic area surrounding the resort and most work full-time jobs in a wide variety of fields in addition to their volunteer hours serving the public at the resort.

Paoli Peaks has over 110 stationary towers & machines. 12 inches of machine-made snow over the entire ski area can be created in a 24-hour period at temperatures of 20 degrees Fahrenheit.

== More Information ==
- Average grade: 10%–15%
- Terrain: 25% beginner, 55% intermediate, 10% advanced, and 10% freestyle terrain park
- Lifts: 7 lifts (1 quad chairlift, 3 triple chairlifts, 1 beginner double chairlift, 1 rope tow, and 2 carpets)
- Uphill capacity: 11,200 skiers per hour
- Average annual snowfall: 25 inches (640 mm)

Paoli Peaks is one of the few resorts that has extensive night skiing. During most of the ski season they are open after dark until 9:00 PM on weeknights. On most weekends they have "Midnight Madness sessions" until 3:00 AM. On weekends without a midnight session they close at 10:00 PM. They also traditionally have a "Midnight Madness" on the Sunday before Martin Luther King, Jr. Day. In addition during the 2012–13 and 2013–14 seasons they had "Old School Midnight Madness" in which they closed for one hour at 11:00 PM in order to groom the slopes and reopened at midnight with skiing and boarding until 6:00 AM. This is a throwback to their original “Midnight Madness Sessions."

Like many other resorts, Paoli Peaks has a "Spring Carnival" towards the end of February or beginning of March each year to celebrate the season and end it on a fun note. They have many events during the carnival, that in recent years included a cardboard sled race, a bikini ski race, and a slosh pit.

== See also ==
- List of ski areas and resorts in the United States
- Perfect North Slopes
