= Vail Resorts =

American mountain resort company

Vail Resorts, Inc.
- Type: Public
- Traded as: NYSE: MTN; S&P 400 component
- Founded: 1997; 29 years ago
- Headquarters: Broomfield, Colorado, U.S.
- Number of locations: 42 (2025)
- Key people: Robert Katz (CEO, Chairman)
- Revenue: ▲US$2.96 billion (2025)
- Operating income: ▲US$560 million (2025)
- Net income: ▲US$280 million (2025)
- Total assets: ▲US$5.78 billion (2025)
- Total equity: ▼US$754 million (2025)
- Number of employees: 6,800 (2025)
- Website: vailresorts.com
- Footnotes; Financials as of July 31, 2025.

Vail Resorts, Inc. is an American mountain resort company headquartered in Broomfield, Colorado. The company is divided among divisions that own and operate 42 mountain resorts in four countries, along with hotels, lodging, condominiums, and golf courses that comprise property real estate holdings.

== History ==
Vail Resorts was founded as Vail Associates Ltd. by Pete Seibert and Earl Eaton in the early 1960s. Eaton, a lifelong resident, led Seibert (a former WWII 10th Mountain Division ski trooper) to the area in March 1957. They both became ski patrol guides at Aspen, Colorado, when they shared their dream of finding the "next great ski mountain." Seibert set off to secure financing, and Eaton engineered the early lifts. Their Vail ski resort opened in 1962. George N. Gillett Jr. purchased Vail Associates in 1985, but the company veered toward bankruptcy by 1991.

In 1992 Vail Associates was acquired by Apollo Ski Partners, a new arm of the private equity firm Apollo Global Management led by billionaire Leon Black. The new ownership led Vail Resorts public in 1997.

In 1996, Vail Resorts completed its first major acquisition with a $310 million purchase of Ralston Resorts, the owner of Keystone, Breckenridge, and Arapahoe Basin. This led to antitrust concerns, and Vail Resorts ultimately sold Arapahoe Basin to a third party due to a ruling from the Department of Justice.

In 2001, Vail Resorts acquired the hotel chain RockResorts.

Rob Katz, a former executive at Apollo, ran Vail Resorts as CEO until November 2021, when he was appointed executive chairperson of the board. Kirsten Lynch, the company's former chief marketing officer, then took over as CEO.

In June 2024, Vail Resorts reported lower-than-expected revenue during the February–April quarter due to a significantly warmer-than-anticipated winter across western North American resorts, with snowfall 28% lower than average. The company generated $1.28 billion in revenue during the quarter despite the stabilizing effect of its Epic Pass program, which allows customers to purchase a season pass for its North American resorts at a significant upfront cost. However, Vail's stock price has declined by 50% since its October 2021 peak of $360.

=== Declining sales and visitation (2024–2025) ===
In the 2024–25 season the company reported that in North America it sold 2% fewer Epic passes than the year prior, which is the first decline in pass sales the company has ever reported. The company attributed the decline to travel "normalization" after COVID and poor snowfall in some areas.

Visitation at Vail's North American resorts in the 2025 ski season, throughout February, March and April, were down by 7% year-over-year.

The outlook for the 2025–26 season is also lower. In early June the company announced fewer pass sales for the upcoming season compared to 2024–25.

In May 2025, CEO Kirsten Lynch resigned after the company had lost over half of its value during her tenure from 2021–2025. Robert Katz, who was formerly CEO for 16 years, returned to the leadership role.

== Criticism ==
Some of Vail Resort's acquisitions have fueled anger among local residents. Locals complain that the Vail's pass structure caters to wealthy international pass holders and reduces access to nearby residents; additionally, residents have seen their cost of living increase following Vail's takeovers.

Vail Resorts’ visitors often complain about long lines. At times the long lines have been caused by ski patrol striking due to inflated property values and inadequate wages. A two-week strike at Park City, Utah around the Christmas holiday in 2024, led to increased wages for ski patrollers, and was followed by new contracts for employees at Keystone and Crested Butte, Colorado.

Local towns have also complained recently about their partnerships with Vail and its mountains. At Heavenly Mountain Resort, the town of South Lake Tahoe, California has voiced grievances of overflowing traffic, parking and negligent tourists, which drain from local resources outside from the town's tax authority. The town has increased its parking rates and capped snow plowing as a result, and hopes to annex parts of the ski mountain to access the tax base. Rural areas like Crested Butte are also finding Vail is unwilling to contribute to costs of airline transportation at regional airports, where resort owners had historically helped subsidize the transportation that helped deliver their customers.

A shareholder, Late Apex Partners, called for massive changes to the company—including a sweep of both the c-suite and board—after five years of significant underperformance by Vail.

All of the aforementioned items, among other things, have contributed to Vail’s poor reputation and earned the company the appellation “Evil Empire.”

=== Epic Pass price increases ===
Vail Resorts has increased the price of the all-access Epic Pass each year since 2021, amounting to a 34% hike over five years.

Price of all-in Epic Pass
Year	Price	% change
2021–22	$783	-
2022–23	$841	+7.4%
2023–24	$909	+8.1%
2024–25	$982	+8.0%
2025–26	$1,051	+7.0%

It also offers a US military rate, which was $230 in 2026.

== List of resorts ==
Vail Resorts operates 42 ski resorts in the United States, Canada, Australia and Switzerland including, notably, the Vail, Beaver Creek, Breckenridge, Keystone, and Crested Butte ski areas in Colorado, and Northstar California, Kirkwood Mountain Resort, and Heavenly Mountain Resort on the California-Nevada border. In British Columbia, Canada, they also acquired the largest ski resort in North America: Whistler Blackcomb. Vail Resorts offers a variety of multi-resort season passes under the Epic Pass program. The Epic Pass also has partnerships that allow access to several other resorts in the US, Canada, Japan, France, Switzerland, Austria, and Italy.

Name	Location	Number of lifts	Date opened	Date acquired	Notes
Afton Alps	(United States) Hastings, Minnesota	22	December 21, 1963	December 6, 2012	
Alpine Valley	(United States) Chesterland, Ohio	5	1965	September 24, 2019	Bought from Peak Resorts along with 16 other mountains.
Andermatt-Sedrun	Andermatt, Uri, Central Switzerland	19		March 28, 2022	Vail owns a 55% share of the resort
Attitash Mountain	(United States) Bartlett, New Hampshire	9	January 26, 1965	September 24, 2019	Bought from Peak Resorts along with 16 other mountains.
Beaver Creek Resort	(United States) Beaver Creek, Colorado	25	December 15, 1980	—N/a	
Big Boulder	(United States) Lake Harmony, Pennsylvania	10	1947	September 24, 2019	Bought from Peak Resorts along with 16 other mountains.
Boston Mills-Brandywine	(United States) Peninsula, Ohio	16	1963	September 24, 2019	Bought from Peak Resorts along with 16 other mountains.
Breckenridge Ski Resort	(United States) Breckenridge, Colorado	32	December 16, 1961	1996	
Crans-Montana	Crans-Montana, Sierre, Valais, Switzerland	19		November 30, 2023	
Crested Butte Mountain Resort	(United States) Crested Butte, Colorado	16	November 23, 1961	September 27, 2018	Acquired through Triple Peaks, LLC, in addition to Mount Sunapee and Okemo, alongside purchase of Stevens Pass.
Crotched Mountain	(United States) Bennington, New Hampshire	5	December 14, 1969	September 24, 2019	Bought from Peak Resorts along with 16 other mountains.
Falls Creek	Bogong High Plains, Victoria, Australia	14	1946	February 22, 2019	Bought from Merlin Entertainments along with Hotham.
Heavenly Mountain Resort	(United States) South Lake Tahoe, California	30	December 15, 1955	March 26, 2002	
Hidden Valley	(United States) Eureka, Missouri	9	1982	September 24, 2019	Bought from Peak Resorts along with 16 other mountains.
Hidden Valley Resort	(United States) Hidden Valley, Pennsylvania	4	1958	December 31, 2021	Bought from Seven Springs Mountain Resort, Inc. and affiliates along with two other resorts.
Hotham Alpine Resort	Mount Hotham, Victoria, Australia	14	1925	February 22, 2019	Bought from Merlin Entertainments along with Falls Creek.
Hunter Mountain	(United States) Hunter, New York	15	January 9, 1960	September 24, 2019	Bought from Peak Resorts along with 16 other mountains.
Jack Frost	(United States) White Haven, Pennsylvania	18	1972	September 24, 2019	Bought from Peak Resorts along with 16 other mountains.
Keystone Resort	(United States) Keystone, Colorado	20	November 21, 1970	1996	
Kirkwood Mountain Resort	(United States) Kirkwood, California	15	1972	February 22, 2012	
Laurel Mountain	(United States) Somerset County, Pennsylvania	1	1939	December 31, 2021	Bought from Seven Springs Mountain Resort, Inc. and affiliates along with two other resorts.
Liberty Mountain Resort	(United States) Fairfield, Pennsylvania	9	1960	September 24, 2019	Bought from Peak Resorts along with 16 other mountains.
Mad River Mountain	(United States) Zanesfield, Ohio	12	1962	September 24, 2019	Bought from Peak Resorts along with 16 other mountains.
Mount Brighton	(United States) Brighton, Michigan	12	1960	December 6, 2012	
Mount Snow	(United States) West Dover, Vermont	20	1954	September 24, 2019	Bought from Peak Resorts along with 16 other mountains.
Mount Sunapee Resort	(United States) Newbury, New Hampshire	11	December 26, 1948	September 27, 2018	Acquired through Triple Peaks, LLC, in addition to Crested Butte and Okemo, alongside purchase of Stevens Pass. The first resort in New Hampshire to be operated by Vail. Owned by the State of New Hampshire but operated alongside Okemo.
Northstar California	(United States) Truckee, California	20	December 1972	October 25, 2010	
Okemo Mountain Resort	(United States) Ludlow, Vermont	20	January 31, 1956	September 27, 2018	Acquired through Triple Peaks, LLC, in addition to Crested Butte and Mount Sunapee, alongside purchase of Stevens Pass.
Paoli Peaks	(United States) Paoli, Indiana	8	December 1978	September 24, 2019	Bought from Peak Resorts along with 16 other mountains.
Park City Mountain Resort	(United States) Park City, Utah	41	December 21, 1963	May 29, 2013 (Canyons) September 11, 2014 (Park City)	In 2015, Vail merged the Park City and Canyons resorts under the Park City Mountain Resort name, connecting them with a gondola.
Perisher Ski Resort	Perisher Valley, Australia	46	1951	2015 March 30, 2015	Vail's first Australian property.
Roundtop Mountain Resort	(United States) Lewisberry, Pennsylvania	7	November 28, 1964	September 24, 2019	Bought from Peak Resorts along with 16 other mountains.
Seven Springs Mountain Resort	(United States) Seven Springs, Pennsylvania	14	1937	December 31, 2021	Bought from Seven Springs Mountain Resort, Inc. and affiliates along with two other resorts.
Snow Creek	(United States) Weston, Missouri	5	1986	September 24, 2019	Bought from Peak Resorts along with 16 other mountains.
Stevens Pass	(United States) Skykomish, Washington	10	1937	August 15, 2018	Purchased and announced alongside Crested Butte, Mount Sunapee, and Okemo.
Stowe Mountain Resort	(United States) Stowe, Vermont	12	February 7, 1937	February 21, 2017	Vail's first resort on the East Coast of the United States.
Vail Ski Resort	(United States) Vail, Colorado	31	December 15, 1962	—N/a	The third-largest ski resort in the United States.
Whistler Blackcomb	Whistler, British Columbia, Canada	37	January 15, 1966	August 8, 2016	Vail owns a 75% interest in Whistler & Blackcomb Partnerships, and the remaining 25% is owned by Nippon Cable
Whitetail Resort	(United States) Mercersburg, Pennsylvania	9	1991	September 24, 2019	Bought from Peak Resorts along with 16 other mountains.
Wildcat Mountain Ski Area	(United States) Gorham, New Hampshire	5	1958 January 25, 1958	September 24, 2019	Bought from Peak Resorts along with 16 other mountains. Wildcat trail initially cut by CCC in 1933; original gondola started operation in 1958. Peak Resorts acquired Wildcat in 2010.
Wilmot Mountain	(United States) Wilmot, Wisconsin	11	February 1938	January 19, 2016	
