= Alpine Valley Ski Area =

Ski area in Ohio, United States

- Interactive map of Alpine Valley Ski Area
- Location: Munson Township, Ohio, US
- Nearest city: Chesterland, Ohio
- Coordinates: 41.5303°N 81.2662°W
- Status: Operating
- Owner: Vail Resorts
- Vertical: 252 ft (77 m)
- Top elevation: 1,500 ft (460 m)
- Base elevation: 1,260 ft (380 m)
- Skiable area: 72 acres (29 ha)
- Trails: 9
- Longest run: 2,600 ft (800 m)
- Lift system: 5 total: 3 chairs: (1quad, 1triple, 1double); 2 surface lift
- Terrain parks: 1
- Snowfall: 120 in (300 cm)
- Snowmaking: Yes
- Night skiing: Yes
- Website: www.alpinevalleyohio.com

Alpine Valley Ski Area is a ski resort located in Munson Township, Geauga County, in the U.S. state of Ohio, east of Chesterland. It was built in 1965 under the direction of Thomas D. Apthorp, who then continued to operate and manage the resort until 2007. It is located in Ohio's snow belt, allowing it to receive the most natural snowfall out of all of Ohio's ski resorts. Although Northeast Ohio is relatively flat and free of mountains, it has on average a 93-day ski-season per year, allowing Alpine Valley to thrive in the winter months.

In July 2019, it was announced that Vail Resorts would acquire the ski area.

== Information ==
Alpine Valley offers a variety of 9 trails for skiers and snowboarders. The resort has over 70 instructors for its ski school which is registered with the Professional Ski Instructors of America (PSIA). Trail levels range from a beginner's bunny hill, to the expert terrain park which boasts Ohio's largest half pipe. It also offers one of the highest vertical drops of the ski resorts in Ohio. The vertical rise has been measured at 252 feet. Alpine Valley also features high-power lighting for night skiing through the season. Although Alpine Valley is located in the snow belt of Ohio and receives roughly 120 inches of natural snowfall yearly, the resort also artificially produces snow on all of the runs once temperatures are below 28 degrees Fahrenheit. Alpine Valley Ski Area has one main lodge where there is a full cafeteria, a bar, a deck and a lounging area. There is also a ski and snowboard shop with rental options.

Statistics

Elevation

- Base: 1,260 ft (380 m)
- Summit: 1,500 ft (460 m)
- Vertical rise: 256 ft (78 m)

Trails

- Skiable area: 72 acres (0.29 km^{2})
- Trails: 9
- Longest run: 2,600 ft (800 m)
- Average annual snowfall: 120 in (300 cm)

Lifts

- Quad chair
- 2 Triple chairs
- 2 Surface lifts (1 carpet for the beginner hill, 1 handle tow from the top of the quad lift to top of the summit of upper exhibition black diamond run)
