= Attitash Mountain Resort =

Ski area in Bartlett, New Hampshire

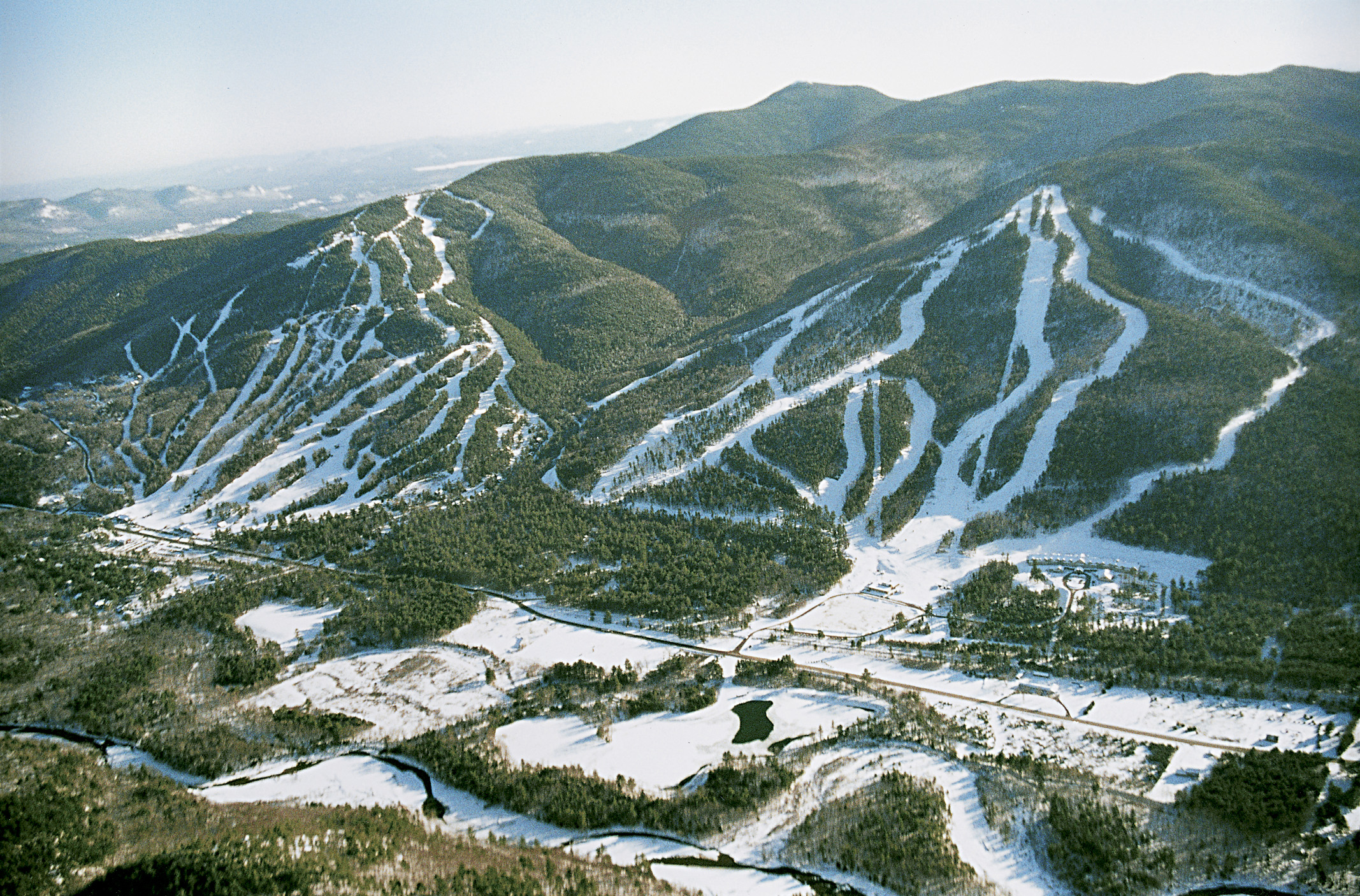
- A view of Attitash and Bear Peak
- Interactive map of Attitash Mountain Resort
- Location: Bartlett, New Hampshire, US
- Nearest city: North Conway
- Coordinates: 44°04′56″N 71°13′47″W
- Status: Operating
- Owner: Vail Resorts
- Vertical: 1,750 ft (530 m)
- Trails: 68 : 29% beginner : 44% intermediate : 27% advanced
- Longest run: 1.34 mi (2.16 km)
- Lift system: 8 Chairlifts: 3 High Speed Quads, 2 Fixed Grip Quads, 2 Triples, and 1 Surface Lift.
- Snowmaking: Yes, 98%
- Website: www.attitash.com

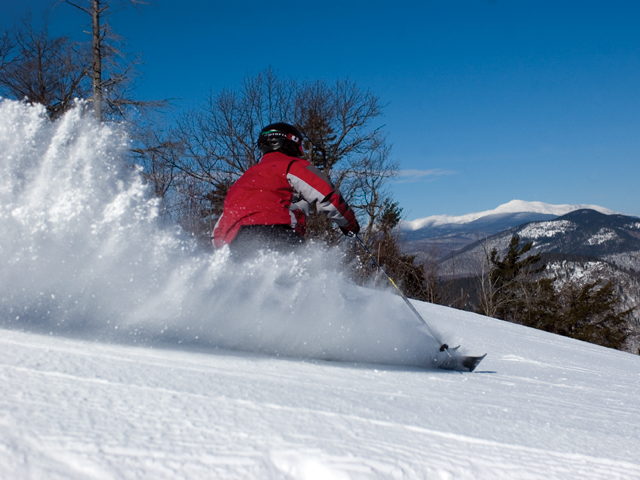
Skiing at Attitash

Attitash Mountain Resort is a ski area located on U.S. Route 302 in Bartlett, New Hampshire, near North Conway. Constructed in 1938 by the Works Progress Administration, as of October 2019, Attitash is operated by Vail Resorts (after being purchased from the previous owners, Peak Resorts). It operates under a special-use permit with the White Mountain National Forest.

Located in the heart of the White Mountains, Attitash is home to two mountains, Attitash and Bear Peak. Attitash/Bear Peak has a total of 68 ski runs. It is a resort that appeals to all skill levels. Both peaks have a high speed quad going from the base to summit as of the 2023-2024 ski season.

== Mountain statistics ==
- Vertical drop: 1,750 ft (530 m) (Attitash); 1,450 ft (440 m) (Bear Peak)
- Base elevation: 600 ft (180 m) (Attitash); 600 ft (180 m) (Bear Peak)
- Summit elevation: 2,350 ft (720 m) (Attitash); 2,050 ft (620 m) (Bear Peak)
- Trails and glades: 68; most difficult 27%; more difficult 44%; easiest 29%
- Total skiable area: 311 acres (1.26 km^{2})
- Trail length: 23 miles (37 km)
- Tree skiing: 60 acres (240,000 m^{2}) of terrain in different glades across Attitash and Bear Peak
- Average annual snowfall: 120 inches (3,000 mm)
- Typical season length: Early December through Early April (depending on natural snowfall and how often temperatures are low enough to allow snowmaking)
- Hours of operation: 8:30 a.m. to 4:00 p.m. weekends and holidays, EST; 9:00 a.m. to 4:00 p.m. mid-week, EST; Times may vary early season: Nov to Dec – 3:30 PM
- Uphill lift capacity: 14,385 people per hour

=== Lifts ===
Attitash has 7 lifts, and 1 magic carpet. When it was owned by ASC, Attitash saw replacements of former lifts with modern models, and expansions. After the ownership of Peak Resorts in 2019, Vail stepped in and installed two new lifts - which were the Progression Quad and The Mountaineer.

Name	Type	Manufacturer	Built	Vertical (feet)	Length (feet)	Notes
The Mountaineer	High Speed Quad	Leitner-Poma	2023	1670	6023	Summit lift to Attitash Peak. It replaced the Summit Triple in 2023.
Flying Bear	High Speed Quad	Doppelmayr	1995	1467	5215	Main lift to Bear Peak summit. The haul rope was replaced in 2023.
Flying Yankee	High Speed Quad	Garaventa CTEC	1998	883	3070	Named after the Flying Yankee locomotive. Travels under The Mountaineer and ends halfway up Attitash. Replaced the resort's first lift.
Abenaki Quad	Fixed Grip Quad	Doppelmayr	1994	1020	3825	Extended downhill in 2007 to serve the condos in between the two mountains.
Progression Quad	Fixed Grip Quad	Doppelmayr	2022	640	2627	Replaced two double chairs, services the beginner area.
Kachina Triple	Triple	Borvig	1997	512	2200	Relocated from Sunday River in 1997. Technical issues prevented it from operating in the 2021–22 season.
Learning Center Triple	Triple	CTEC	1988	263	1210	Services the Learning Center beginner trails.
Snowbelt	Magic Carpet	Snow Kid				Only surface lift at the resort, serving only one trail.

Former lifts:

Name	Type	Builder	Years active	Notes
East Double Double	Double	Borvig	1973 - 2022	Had a mid-station.
West Double Double	Double	Borvig	1973 - 2022	
Top Notch Double	Double	Hall	1968 - 2018	Ran adjacent to the Summit Triple.
Summit	Triple	CTEC	1986 - 2023	Ran to the summit of Attitash.

== Winter ==
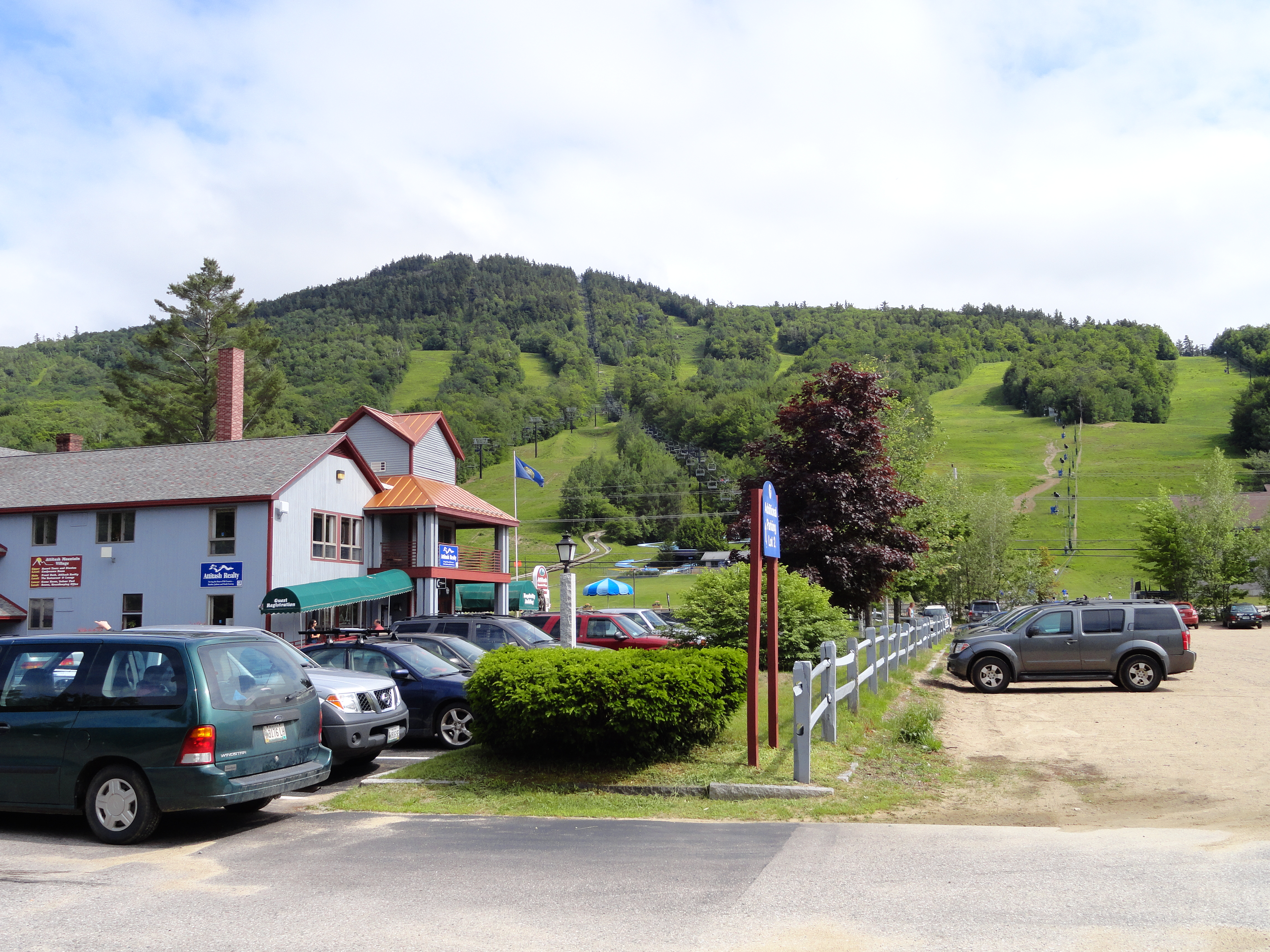
A view of the slopes of Attitash in summer

Attitash has two peaks, Attitash and Bear Peak, both of which offer a variety of terrain. Attitash consists of old New England–style trails, many of which are narrow with challenging fall lines. It also offers a learning center, featuring a Snowbelt, Learning Center chairlift and the Progression Quad (formerly the Double Double chairlift), which provides access to beginner green trails and an intermediate blue trail.

Several black diamond trails, namely Upper Ptarmigan, Middle Ptarmigan, and Tim's Trauma, have a very high difficulty even in good conditions due to the terrain. Attitash also features several beginner-friendly green trails, such as Counselor's Run and Inside Out, and moderate blue trails, such as Ammonoosuc and Upper/Lower Cathedral. There is one official glade located between Lower Cathedral and Lower Highway.

Bear Peak was developed by the American Ski Company as a competitor, but financial issues prevented it from opening until a partnership deal was reached with Attitash, who needed their connections to get permits. It features wider trails and more glades, most of which are located directly under the Abenaki lift, with the other being located on Wandering Skis. Highlights on this peak include that trail due to its long length with a steady drop, the racing trail Illusion with its balance of flats and steeps, as well as a few other black diamonds that range in difficulty. Although there is a small kids' area, it is much smaller compared to the Attitash kids' area.

The resort has three high-speed quads. The Mountaineer and The Flying Bear at Attitash and Bear Peak take skiers straight to the summits, and the Flying Yankee at Attitash taking skiers halfway up the mountain 860 vertical feet in 6 minutes (4.5 minutes no stops).

In the era of Peak Resorts, snowmaking and grooming were vastly improved, and Attitash Mountain Resort finally overcame its long Chapter 11 Bankruptcy. While the half pipe was removed, the terrain park was arguably improved by splitting it into three separate parks and moving them all to Bear Peak, allowing the blue they originally occupied to be used for the ski school.

In the second half of the 2018/2019 season, the top half of Attitash was closed due to major problems with the Summit Triple lift. Despite a fairly new bull wheel (replaced just a few years earlier to prevent further breakdowns), it was found to also be in need of massive repair to the gear box, including a replacement planetary gear.

In the 2021-2022 ski season, technical issues plagued the Double Double and Kachina Triple lifts. Vail announced the replacement of the Double Double with a fixed-quip quad. Although it was not high speed, it was faster than the doubles since it was a newer lift. Repairs to the Kachina Triple were also announced, and both were completed by the start of the 2022-23 ski season. The replacement for the kids was a welcome improvement, removing another outdated set of lifts. The dining areas also reopened that season, after years of closure due to COVID.

Meanwhile, after announcing to locals Vail was going to be the first owners to actually attempt a replacement for the Triple, they got approval for a high speed quad in November 2022. The replacement, named The Mountaineer, opened at the end of December in the 2023-2024 ski season. Tree cutting had started during the 2022–2023 season and the lift closed one week early as the Progression Quad did to ensure it would be done on time. It will cut the time to the summit to 6 minutes (no stops) instead of 16, making it slightly faster than the other two high speed quads because of it being a more modern lift. During the summer of 2023 Attitash also surprised locals by replacing the haul rope of the Flying Bear. They clarified this was preventative as the old haul rope was still usable, but starting to provide a rough ride, so the new rope was to restore the smoothness ofe the ride, and that no other changes (excluding the annual maintenance) were being done. This was a faster fix done in just a few days.

On February 2, 2025, the "Flying Bear" lift at Bear Peak experienced a chair disconnect causing its single occupant to fall 20 feet to the ground. The skier was brought to a local hospital with non-life-threatening injuries. Investigations have opened regarding the conditions of the lift and the lift itself was closed an investigation was initiated. The investigation determined the accident was due to the grip of the carrier malfunctioning. The grip and carrier were subsequently replaced and the lift went back into operation on March 11, 2025.

== Summer ==
Attitash also had summer activities, but these have not run since Summer 2019, as Vail has prioritized improvements to Winter Operations. A summer day pass included the alpine slides, both of which run the same route starting halfway up the mountain, the mountain coaster (similar to the alpine slide, but allowing for higher speeds due to being locked onto the track), a climbing wall, Euro bungee trampolines, a giant air bag jump, and cornhole boards.

Three attractions available for an additional cost were Mountain biking, horseback riding and the newest attraction, the East Coast's longest single-span zip-line, installed by previous owner Peak Resorts.

The mountain formerly featured four water slides that were demolished in Fall 2022 to make way for the base station of the Mountaineer lift. Although locals were hopeful for Summer operations to resume 2023, this could not happen because as in 2022, the base was an active construction zone for building the new lift.

General Manager Brandon Swartz has announced that new summer attractions are being discussed, however it is unknown what these are, when they would open, or if they will actually happen. Its also unknown whether any new attractions would replace the remaining summer attractions from past owners or be built alongside them.
