= Terrain park =

Outdoor recreation area for ski and snowboard tricks

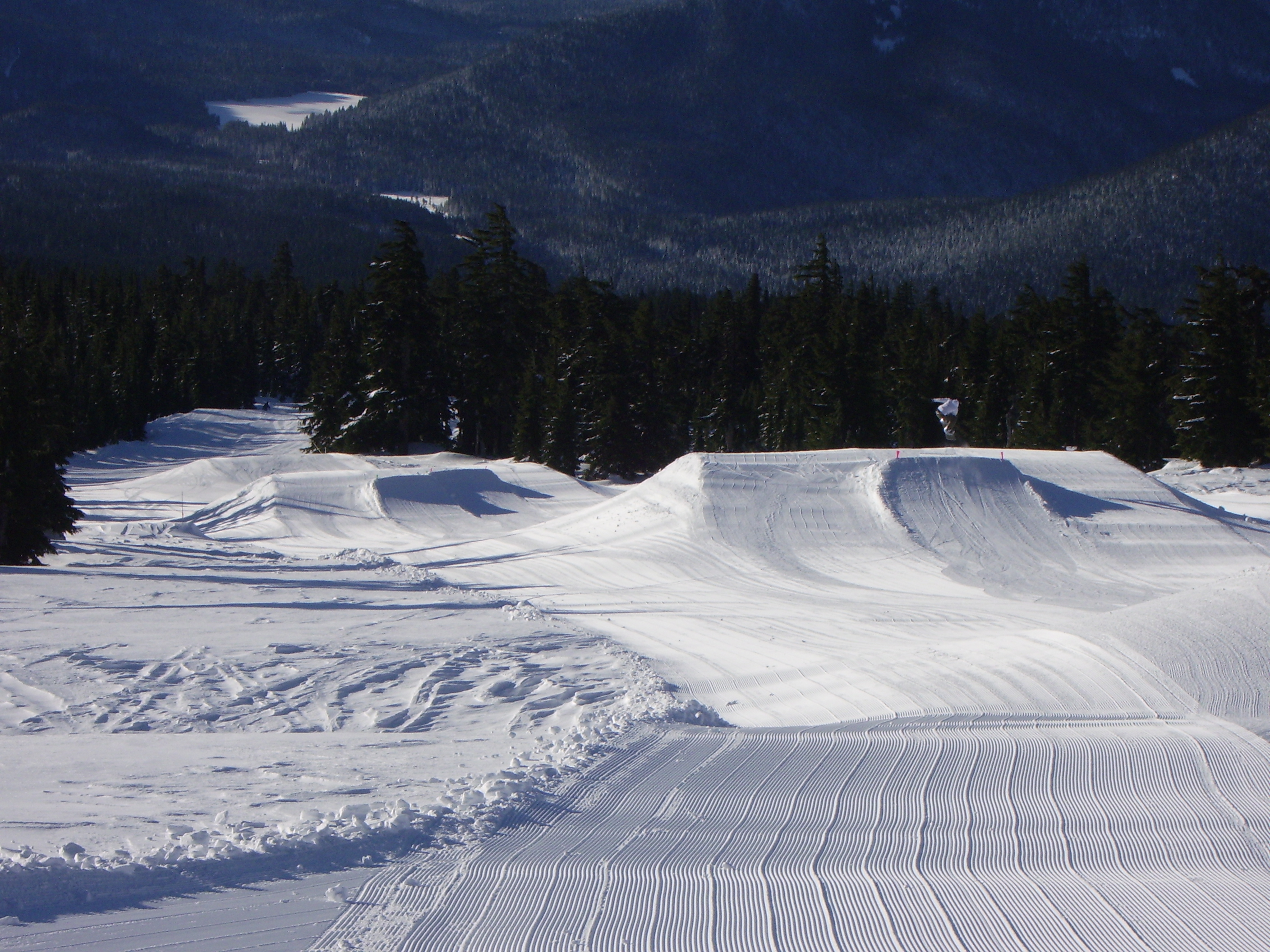
This terrain park begins with three jumps.

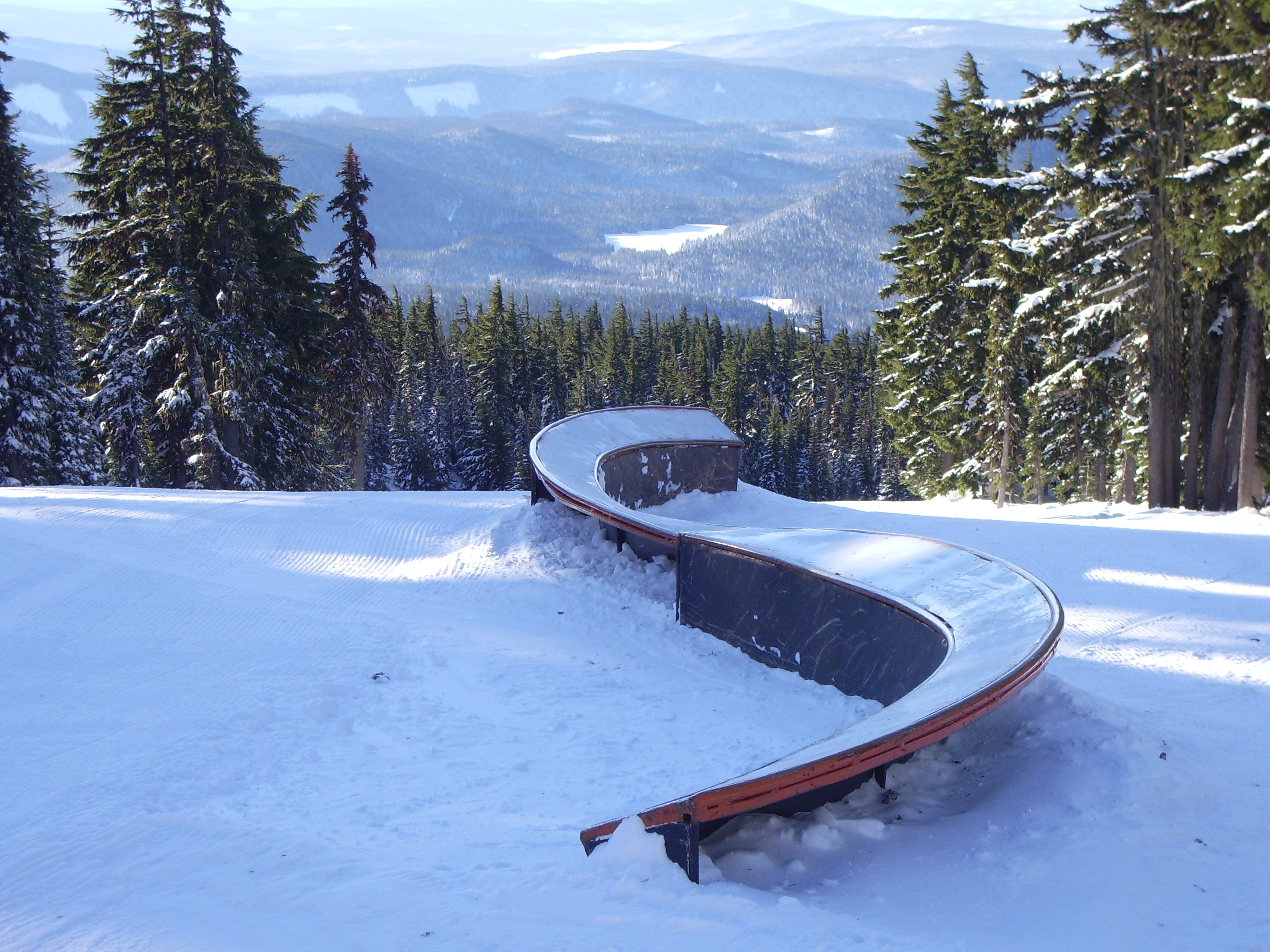
S-box at the bottom of the same terrain park at Timberline Lodge ski area

A terrain park or snow park is an outdoor recreation area containing terrain that allows skiers, snowboarders and snowbikers to perform tricks. Terrain parks have their roots in skateparks and many of the features are common to both.

From their inception to as recently as the 1980s, ski areas generally banned jumping and any kind of aerial maneuvers, usually under penalty of revoking the offender's lift ticket. By the 1990s, most areas provided snow features specifically catering to aerial snowsports. One of the first in-bounds terrain parks was the snowboard park built in 1990 at Vail's (Colorado) resort. The park was soon copied in other resorts. Today most resorts have terrain parks, with many having multiple parks of various difficulty. Some resorts are almost exclusively terrain parks such as Echo Mountain Park in Evergreen, Colorado and Snow Park in Wānaka, New Zealand. In Colorado there has been a recent trend for defunct resorts such as Squaw Pass (now Echo Mountain Park) to be reopened, catering to terrain park users.

== History ==
The first known terrain park (then called a ‘snowboard park’) was built at Bear Valley Ski Area (California) in the 1989–90 season. It was the brainchild of Bear Valley's Marketing Director Sean McMahon and California snowboarder and contest organizer Mike McDaniel.

McMahon's idea was to create an area of the mountain specifically for snowboarders—modeled after the skateparks of the 1970s, featuring jumps, jibs, and a halfpipe—that would bring new customers to the small, family operated ski area in the Central Sierra. He enlisted the help of McDaniel, who had experience building snowboard-specific terrain features such as halfpipes and jumps, through his work organizing early snowboard events. McDaniel in turn, brought in snowboard pioneers Mike Chantry and Keith Kimmel to consult on the design and construction of the park, to be located on the front side of Bear Valley's upper mountain.

A surface lift was installed to bring snowboarders from the bottom of the area back to the top, without having to take a chair lift to the top of the mountain. Kim Krause, who had run lifts in other areas of the resort, was brought on as the park's first lift operator.

It became apparent that the park would need ongoing construction, grooming, and maintenance, and McDaniel was hired by Bear Valley in the fall of 1989 to be Snowboard Park Manager. The new mountain attraction was dubbed the “Polar Park.” Opening day in late November 1989 featured a demonstration by professional snowboarders Damian Sanders, Terry Kidwell, Noah Salasnek, Mike and Tina Basich and others. The event was covered by Thrasher Magazine, International Snowboard Magazine and local media.

== Difficulty ==
Terrain parks (in the United States and Canada) have designations with respect to safety similar to standard alpine slopes. They differ in their designation and degrees of difficulty. They are identified with orange ovals to differentiate them from standard slopes, and are further distinguished by large, medium, or small features. While features vary between resorts, small features are commonly short jumps and rails that are at the slope surface, medium features are 10-to-30-foot (3.0 to 9.1 m) jumps along with jibs requiring small jumps to mount. Large features include 30-to-90-foot (9.1 to 27.4 m) jumps along with complex jibs and large vertical pipes.

"Progression parks" are easier terrain parks, meant for those just starting to ride these features.

== Jibs ==
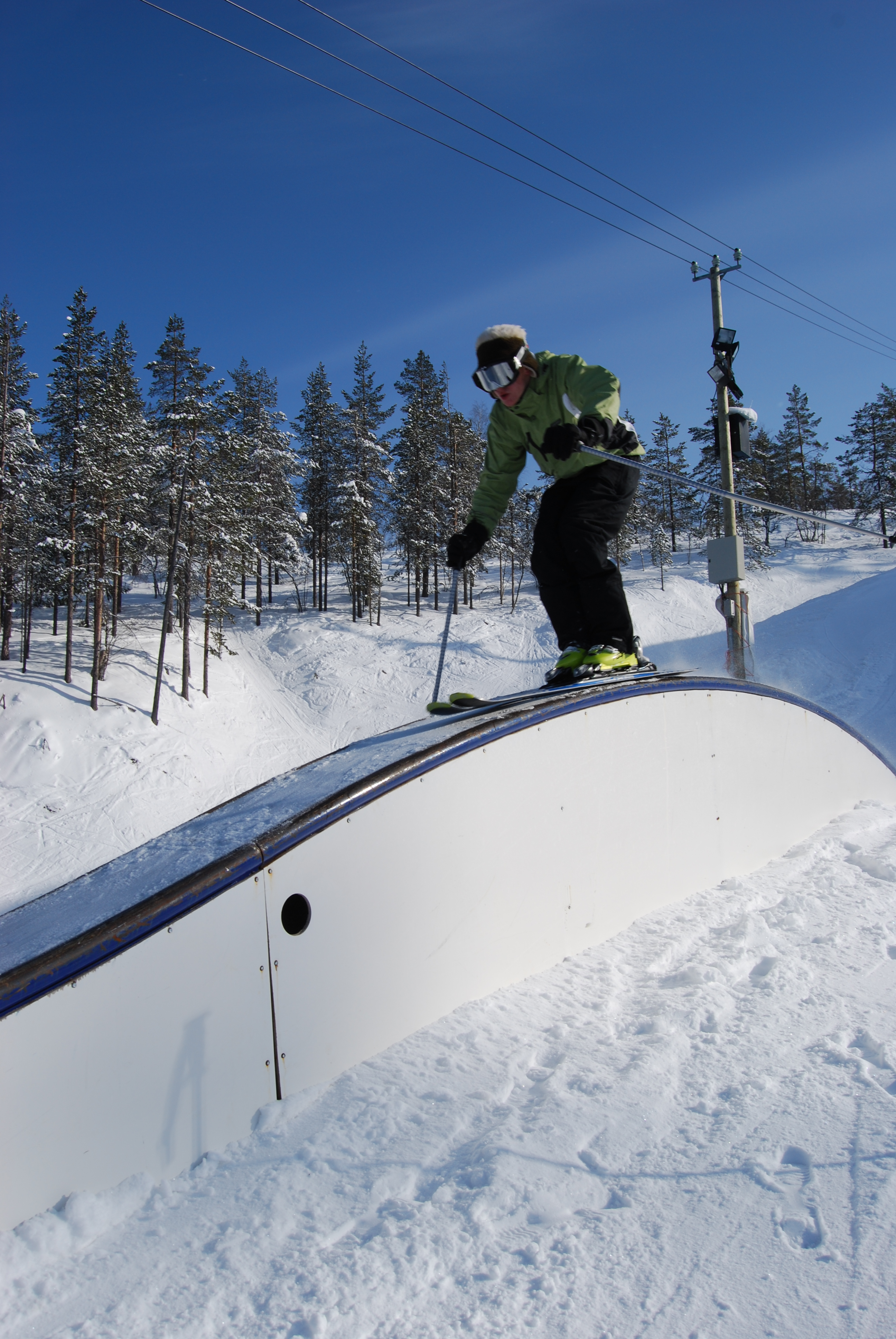
Skier on funbox in terrain park in Levi, Finland

Jibs are any type of fixture that can be ridden with the board/skis parallel or perpendicular to the snow surface, ridden while spinning around, or jumped or tricked from. Many jib features resemble outdoor items used when snowboarding in urban areas, such as stair handrails, benches, tables, etc. In the park these feature consist of:

Rail
A metal feature, either rounded or with a flat surface, which a skier or snowboarder can slide across (called "jibbing"). Many people confuse rails with wider surfaces with boxes, however these are not, and are just rails with a little UHMWPE on top.
Box
Similar to a rail, but wider with an ultra high molecular weight polyethylene (UHMWPE) surface. May or may not have metal edges. Compare Funbox, for skateboarding.
Table Top
Similar to a box, but much wider. Commonly used by beginners who want to become comfortable with box type surfaces before moving on to real boxes. Table Tops are very wide and therefore allow a skier or snowboarder to slide across the surface and is difficult to fall on.
Trees
used as natural surfaces and can be found either on or off the trails.

Rails and boxes have many different shapes and sizes: straight, sloped, curved (often called a "Rainbow"), or kinked. Rails, especially rainbow, will also be seen curving over obstacles or vehicles.

Park Bench and Picnic Table
A funbox type feature that resembles a park bench or picnic table. The edges are made of metal rails and the surfaces of UHMWPE. These features provide multiple sliding surfaces.
Mail Box
A large diameter metal pipe of varying lengths with a cross-section resembling a mail box.
Wall ride
A vertical, or near-vertical, wall-like surface. Most wall rides have another similar surface at the top that is angled down towards the wall, but more perpendicular to the ground (like a sideways funbox attached to the top of the wall ride)
Barrels
A more recent addition to terrain parks, barrels are features usually shaped like garbage cans or vertical cylinders with a small jump leading up to it. This feature is jibbed by going off the jump and tapping it in various ways with your skis or snowboard. Variations include spinning to and from the barrel, tapping with different parts of the skis or stalling on top of the barrel.
Rainbow
A box or rail that has a hump like a "rainbow."
Kink

A box or rail that has one or more "kinks". A kink is a sudden change in angle of a sliding surface. An example of a kinked feature is a F-D-F (flat-down-flat).

Pole Jam

A rail that is stuck into a jump at an upward angle

Tap Feature

A feature that comes in many shapes and sizes and is meant to be tapped with either the tail or tip end of skis or snowboards.

== Jumps ==
Jumps in terrain parks can range from five feet to more than 100 feet, and will vary park to park and resort to resort. In contrast to jibs, typically being manufactured off-site of steel and plastic, jumps are most commonly constructed entirely of snow or snow with a base of dirt. Tricks such as grabs, twists, spins and flips are often performed while in the air from a jump. Types of jumps in a park may consist of:

Table topper
A jump that looks somewhat like a table or trapezoid in which one takes off from an incline (the lip), clear a flat part (the table), and lands on a downslope (the landing).
Step-down
A jump in which the landing is lower than the takeoff.
Step-up
A jump in which the landing is higher than the takeoff.
Gap
A jump that has a gap in between the take off and landing, instead of a table.
Hip
A jump with one landing, which is perpendicular to the take off.
Spine
A jump with two landings, which are perpendicular to the take off. Similar to a hip, but with a landing on both sides.
Channel gap
Looks like a wide jump cut at the middle, so it becomes a gap between the two jumps.

== Vertical ==
- Half-pipe: a downhill trough with vertical lips on each side, resembling half of a cylinder.
- Quarter-pipe: a vertical lip with the intention that the user launch straight into the air, then land on the same lip.

== Terrain park only areas ==
Terrain park only areas which are similar to regular resorts are becoming more common and are increasing in popularity. These areas typically have jumps and features on all trails and are generally smaller than most resorts. While their size may be less than that of larger resorts these areas are more appealing to terrain park riders as they are typically cheaper, have more extreme or uncommon features, and have music played over loud speakers throughout the area. These areas are generally rider owned and operated. Carinthia Parks at Mount Snow, Vermont is the only all terrain park mountain face in New England with two lifts accessing nine different parks.

== See also ==
- Skatepark
- Freestyle
- Rope tows
- X Games
- Trampolining
- Slopestyle
