= List of mountains in Gallatin County, Montana =

There are at least 100 named mountains in Gallatin County, Montana.

- Alex Lowe Peak, 45°25′38″N 111°00′52″W, el. 10,020 feet (3,050 m)
- Amber Butte, 45°25′00″N 111°02′03″W, el. 8,806 feet (2,684 m)
- Apex Point, 44°59′19″N 111°21′24″W, el. 9,039 feet (2,755 m)
- Avalanche Spire Rock, 45°25′50″N 111°11′23″W, el. 6,732 feet (2,052 m)
- Bald Peak, 44°43′32″N 111°20′54″W, el. 10,180 feet (3,100 m)
- Baldy Mountain, 45°46′03″N 110°56′38″W, el. 8,829 feet (2,691 m)
- Big Horn Peak, 45°04′01″N 111°03′00″W, el. 9,934 feet (3,028 m)
- Black Butte, 45°01′55″N 111°05′49″W, el. 8,396 feet (2,559 m)
- Blacktail Mountain, 46°01′47″N 111°04′34″W, el. 8,369 feet (2,551 m)
- Boat Mountain, 44°53′55″N 111°20′30″W, el. 8,957 feet (2,730 m)
- Bozeman Beacon, 45°41′35″N 110°59′01″W, el. 5,646 feet (1,721 m)
- Bridger Peak, 45°46′46″N 110°56′20″W, el. 8,583 feet (2,616 m)
- Burnt Top, 45°07′18″N 111°12′09″W, el. 8,717 feet (2,657 m)
- Cameron Point, 45°04′21″N 111°12′46″W, el. 7,608 feet (2,319 m)
- Canary Bird Peak, 45°06′21″N 111°03′36″W, el. 7,933 feet (2,418 m)
- Center Hill, 45°37′12″N 110°48′07″W, el. 7,234 feet (2,205 m)
- Chestnut Mountain, 45°36′20″N 110°52′56″W, el. 7,667 feet (2,337 m)
- Cinnamon Mountain, 45°07′49″N 111°16′06″W, el. 9,226 feet (2,812 m)
- Coffin Mountain, 44°46′39″N 111°21′49″W, el. 9,967 feet (3,038 m)
- Cone Peak, 44°55′41″N 111°11′27″W, el. 9,662 feet (2,945 m)
- Crown Butte, 45°04′00″N 111°08′12″W, el. 8,035 feet (2,449 m)
- Divide Peak, 45°24′12″N 110°58′30″W, el. 10,033 feet (3,058 m)
- Drinking Horse Mountain, 45°42′20″N 110°58′17″W, el. 5,522 feet (1,683 m)
- Eaglehead Mountain, 45°13′27″N 111°07′33″W, el. 9,947 feet (3,032 m)
- Eaglehead Mountain, 45°13′30″N 111°08′07″W, el. 9,774 feet (2,979 m)
- Elephant Mountain, 45°26′20″N 110°59′27″W, el. 10,020 feet (3,050 m)
- Flaming Arrow Rock, 45°42′30″N 110°58′03″W, el. 4,980 feet (1,520 m)
- Flanders Mountain, 45°26′23″N 110°56′42″W, el. 9,862 feet (3,006 m)
- Fortress Mountain, 45°10′03″N 111°06′44″W, el. 9,613 feet (2,930 m)
- Francham Mountain, 45°36′30″N 110°54′07″W, el. 7,126 feet (2,172 m)
- Fridley Peak, 45°23′04″N 110°56′19″W, el. 10,082 feet (3,073 m)
- Garnet Mountain, 45°25′36″N 111°12′23″W, el. 8,202 feet (2,500 m)
- Grassy Mountain, 45°49′21″N 110°51′42″W, el. 7,605 feet (2,318 m)
- Green Mountain, 45°41′53″N 110°52′27″W, el. 6,834 feet (2,083 m)
- Grouse Mountain, 45°05′47″N 111°10′33″W, el. 8,409 feet (2,563 m)
- Grouse Mountain, 46°02′36″N 110°54′18″W, el. 7,461 feet (2,274 m)
- Hardscrabble Peak, 45°54′52″N 110°58′57″W, el. 9,527 feet (2,904 m)
- Hatfield Mountain, 46°05′24″N 110°58′32″W, el. 7,628 feet (2,325 m)
- Horse Butte, 44°45′05″N 111°11′41″W, el. 7,014 feet (2,138 m)
- Horsethief Mountain, 46°01′59″N 111°00′13″W, el. 6,959 feet (2,121 m)
- Hyalite Peak, 45°22′52″N 110°57′40″W, el. 10,295 feet (3,138 m)
- Jumbo Mountain (Gallatin County, Montana), 45°21′21″N 111°17′03″W, el. 10,417 feet (3,175 m)
- King Butte, 45°04′05″N 111°04′49″W, el. 9,301 feet (2,835 m)
- Kinor Peak, 45°26′48″N 111°00′51″W, el. 8,976 feet (2,736 m)
- Lava Butte, 45°03′12″N 111°06′20″W, el. 7,880 feet (2,400 m)
- Lemondrop, 45°12′10″N 111°13′28″W, el. 7,339 feet (2,237 m)
- Lincoln Mountain, 45°04′17″N 111°17′01″W, el. 7,700 feet (2,300 m)
- Lionhead, 44°43′43″N 111°19′25″W, el. 9,554 feet (2,912 m)
- Little Round Mountain, 45°56′33″N 111°14′12″W, el. 5,564 feet (1,696 m)
- Lombard Hill, 46°06′24″N 111°23′47″W, el. 3,976 feet (1,212 m)
- Lone Indian Peak, 45°09′06″N 111°09′35″W, el. 8,602 feet (2,622 m)
- Maid of the Mist Mountain, 45°24′59″N 110°58′12″W, el. 9,570 feet (2,920 m)
- Marble Point, 45°04′37″N 111°14′10″W, el. 8,048 feet (2,453 m)
- Monument Mountain, 44°58′38″N 111°10′22″W, el. 10,056 feet (3,065 m)
- Mount Baldy, 45°44′00″N 110°57′33″W, el. 7,106 feet (2,166 m)
- Mount Blackmore, 45°26′39″N 111°00′11″W, el. 10,052 feet (3,064 m)
- Mount Bole, 45°24′58″N 110°59′53″W, el. 10,328 feet (3,148 m)
- Mount Chipperfield, 45°19′38″N 111°21′16″W, el. 9,938 feet (3,029 m)
- Mount Chisholm, 45°24′18″N 110°55′48″W, el. 9,744 feet (2,970 m)
- Mount Ellis, 45°34′39″N 110°57′22″W, el. 8,340 feet (2,540 m)
- Mount Hebgen, 44°49′24″N 111°13′39″W, el. 8,691 feet (2,649 m)
- Naya Nuki Peak, 45°53′30″N 110°57′43″W, el. 9,449 feet (2,880 m)
- Nixon Peak, 45°52′38″N 110°48′58″W, el. 6,834 feet (2,083 m)
- Noon Mark, 45°30′07″N 111°12′36″W, el. 7,487 feet (2,282 m)
- Overlook Mountain, Montana, 45°24′20″N 110°56′33″W, el. 10,243 feet (3,122 m)
- Packsaddle Peak, 45°10′27″N 111°03′15″W, el. 9,682 feet (2,951 m)
- Palace Butte, 45°25′18″N 110°58′39″W, el. 9,898 feet (3,017 m)
- Palisade Mountain, 45°28′58″N 110°55′35″W, el. 9,262 feet (2,823 m)
- Pika Point, 44°59′01″N 111°18′36″W, el. 9,501 feet (2,896 m)
- Pine Butte, 45°38′56″N 111°13′37″W, el. 5,207 feet (1,587 m)
- Pomp Peak, 45°54′18″N 110°58′36″W, el. 9,550 feet (2,910 m)
- Ramshorn Peak, 45°09′20″N 111°05′35″W, el. 10,213 feet (3,113 m)
- Red Mountain, 44°56′48″N 111°09′32″W, el. 9,977 feet (3,041 m)
- Red Rock Mountain, 46°03′34″N 110°58′39″W, el. 7,290 feet (2,220 m)
- Redstreak Peak, 44°54′56″N 111°12′43″W, el. 10,338 feet (3,151 m)
- Ross Peak, 45°51′31″N 110°57′22″W, el. 9,012 feet (2,747 m)
- Round Mountain, 45°55′21″N 111°14′43″W, el. 5,505 feet (1,678 m)
- Ruby Mountain, 45°35′08″N 111°19′29″W, el. 6,243 feet (1,903 m)
- Rugged Mountain, location unknown, el. 8,386 feet (2,556 m)
- Sacagawea Peak, 45°53′44″N 110°58′08″W, el. 9,596 feet (2,925 m)
- Saddle Peak, 45°47′37″N 110°56′12″W, el. 9,134 feet (2,784 m)
- Sage Peak, 44°55′50″N 111°14′45″W, el. 10,462 feet (3,189 m)
- Sandy Butte, 44°47′17″N 111°04′36″W, el. 6,952 feet (2,119 m)
- Sleeping Giant Mountain, 45°27′19″N 110°56′33″W, el. 8,917 feet (2,718 m)
- Snowslide Mountain, 44°57′34″N 111°10′29″W, el. 10,016 feet (3,053 m)
- Spire Rock, 45°26′25″N 111°10′55″W, el. 6,378 feet (1,944 m)
- Streamboat Mountain, 45°10′50″N 111°03′35″W, el. 9,987 feet (3,044 m)
- Storm Castle, 45°27′01″N 111°13′24″W, el. 7,165 feet (2,184 m)
- Sunshine Point, 45°04′26″N 111°10′50″W, el. 8,209 feet (2,502 m)
- Table Mountain, 46°05′13″N 111°06′54″W, el. 5,285 feet (1,611 m)
- Table Mountain, 45°19′56″N 111°15′12″W, el. 9,833 feet (2,997 m)
- Tepee Point, 44°54′24″N 111°08′20″W, el. 9,409 feet (2,868 m)
- The Mummy, 45°26′50″N 110°56′33″W, el. 9,354 feet (2,851 m)
- The Sentinel, 45°17′54″N 111°05′22″W, el. 9,623 feet (2,933 m)
- Timber Butte, 45°24′48″N 111°04′21″W, el. 7,333 feet (2,235 m)
- Twin Peaks, 45°09′54″N 111°04′59″W, el. 10,059 feet (3,066 m)
- Wheeler Mountain, 45°30′35″N 111°04′56″W, el. 8,599 feet (2,621 m)
- White Peak, 44°54′42″N 111°12′07″W, el. 10,236 feet (3,120 m)
- Wilson Peak, 45°19′37″N 111°19′32″W, el. 10,495 feet (3,199 m)
- Zade Mountain, 46°01′34″N 111°03′01″W, el. 8,084 feet (2,464 m)

== See also ==
- List of mountains in Montana
- List of mountain ranges in Montana
