= Hardscrabble Peak =

Mountain in Montana, United States

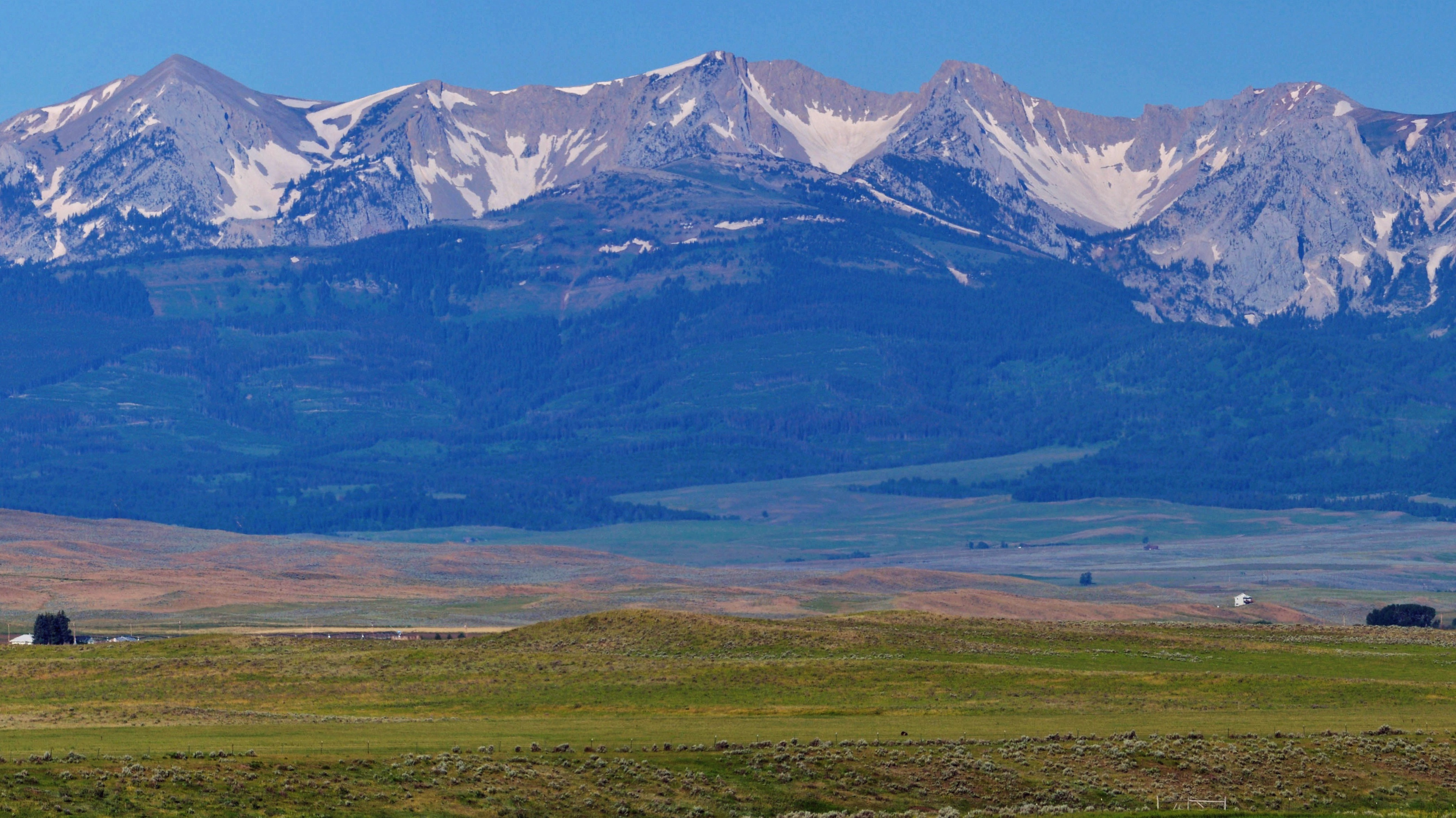
- East aspect, centered

Highest point
- Elevation: 9,571 ft (2,917 m)
- Prominence: 315 ft (96 m)
- Parent peak: Sacagawea Peak
- Isolation: 1.43 mi (2.30 km)
- Coordinates: 45°54′51″N 110°58′55″W

Geography
- Location within Montana Location within the United States
- Country: United States
- State: Montana
- County: Gallatin
- Protected area: Gallatin National Forest
- Parent range: Bridger Range; Rocky Mountains
- Topo map: USGS Sacagawea Peak

Geology
- Rock age: Mississippian
- Rock type: Limestone of Madison Group

Hardscrabble Peak is a 9,571-foot-elevation (2,917-meter) mountain summit in Gallatin County, Montana, United States.

== Description ==
Hardscrabble Peak is the fourth-highest peak in the Bridger Range which is a subrange of the Rocky Mountains. The peak is situated 16 miles (26 km) north of Bozeman in the Gallatin National Forest. Precipitation runoff from the mountain's east slope drains to Fairy Creek → Flathead Creek → Shields River → Yellowstone River, whereas the west slope drains into tributaries of the East Gallatin River. Topographic relief is significant as the summit rises 2,000 feet (610 meters) above Fairy Lake in 1.25 miles (2.01 km). This mountain's toponym has been officially adopted by the United States Board on Geographic Names. "Hardscrabble" is land that is rocky or of poor quality.

== Climate ==
According to the Köppen climate classification system, the mountain is located in an alpine subarctic climate zone with long, cold, snowy winters, and cool to warm summers. Winter temperatures can drop below 0 °F with wind chill factors below −10 °F. Due to its altitude, it receives precipitation all year, as snow in winter and as thunderstorms in summer.

== See also ==
- Geology of the Rocky Mountains
