= Pomp Peak =

Mountain in Montana, United States

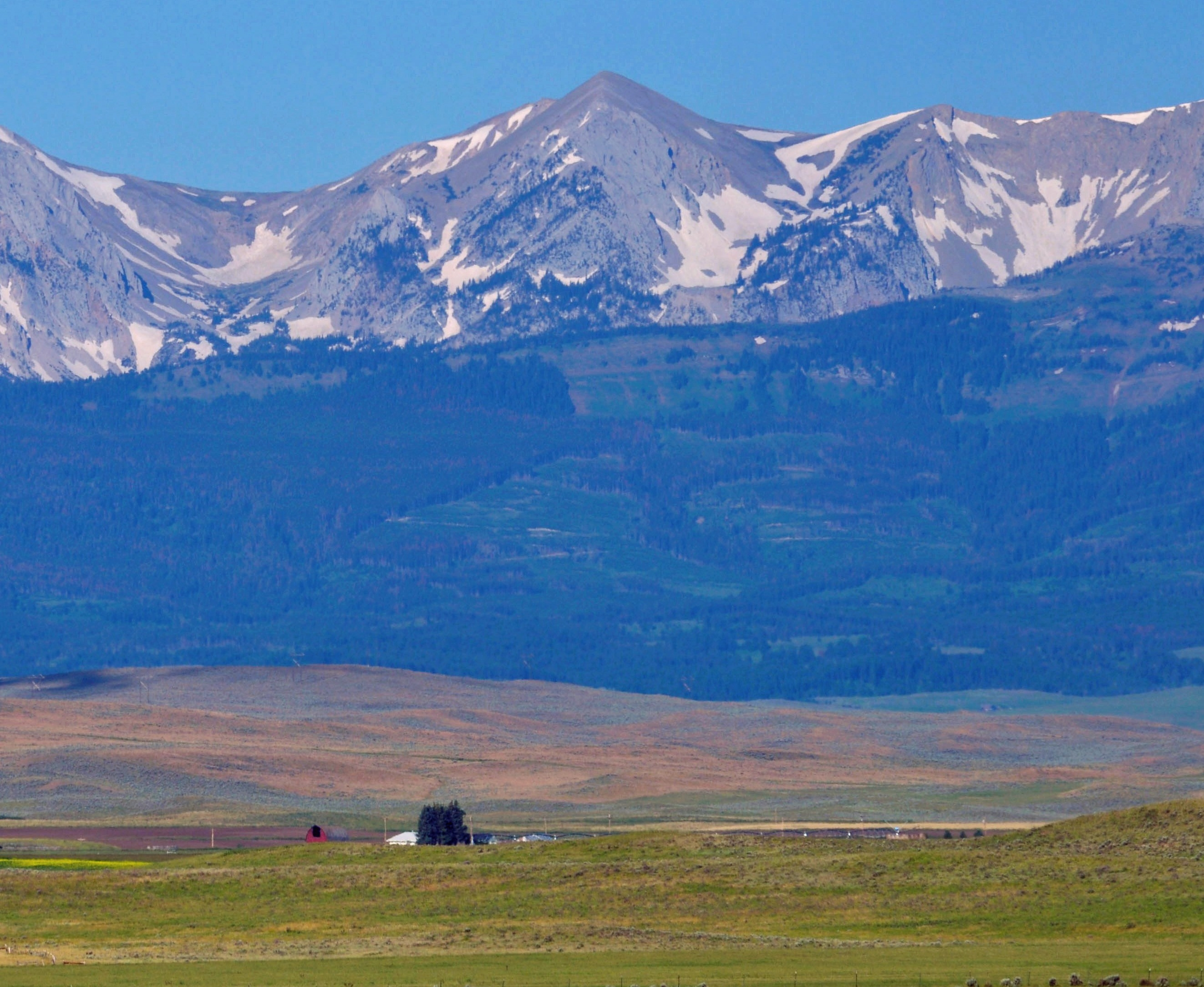
- East aspect, centered

Highest point
- Elevation: 9,576 ft (2,919 m)
- Prominence: 601 ft (183 m)
- Isolation: 0.66 mi (1.06 km)
- Coordinates: 45°54′19″N 110°58′36″W

Naming
- Etymology: Jean Baptiste "Pomp" Charbonneau

Geography
- Location within Montana Location within the United States
- Country: United States
- State: Montana
- County: Gallatin
- Protected area: Gallatin National Forest
- Parent range: Bridger Range; Rocky Mountains
- Topo map: USGS Sacagawea Peak

Geology
- Rock age: Mississippian
- Rock type: Limestone of Madison Group

Climbing
- Easiest route: class 2

Pomp Peak is a 9,576-foot-elevation (2,919-meter) mountain summit in Gallatin County, Montana, United States.

== Description ==
Pomp Peak is the third-highest peak in the Bridger Range which is a subrange of the Rocky Mountains. The peak is situated 16 miles (26 km) north of Bozeman in the Gallatin National Forest. Precipitation runoff from the mountain's east slope drains to Fairy Creek → Flathead Creek → Shields River → Yellowstone River, whereas the west slope drains to Reese Creek → Smith Creek → East Gallatin River. Topographic relief is significant as the summit rises 2,000 feet (610 meters) above Fairy Lake in 0.85 miles (1.37 km). This mountain's toponym was officially adopted on June 12, 2008, by the United States Board on Geographic Names to honor Jean Baptiste "Pomp" Charbonneau (1805–1866), the son of Sacagawea, the Shoshone Indian scout on the Lewis and Clark Expedition. Pomp Peak is located less than one mile immediately northwest of Sacagawea Peak. Pompeys Pillar National Monument is also named for Pomp.

== Climate ==
According to the Köppen climate classification system, the mountain is located in an alpine subarctic climate zone with long, cold, snowy winters, and cool to warm summers. Winter temperatures can drop below 0 °F with wind chill factors below −10 °F. Due to its altitude, it receives precipitation all year, as snow in winter and as thunderstorms in summer.

== See also ==
- Geology of the Rocky Mountains
