= Naya Nuki Peak =

Mountain in Montana, United States

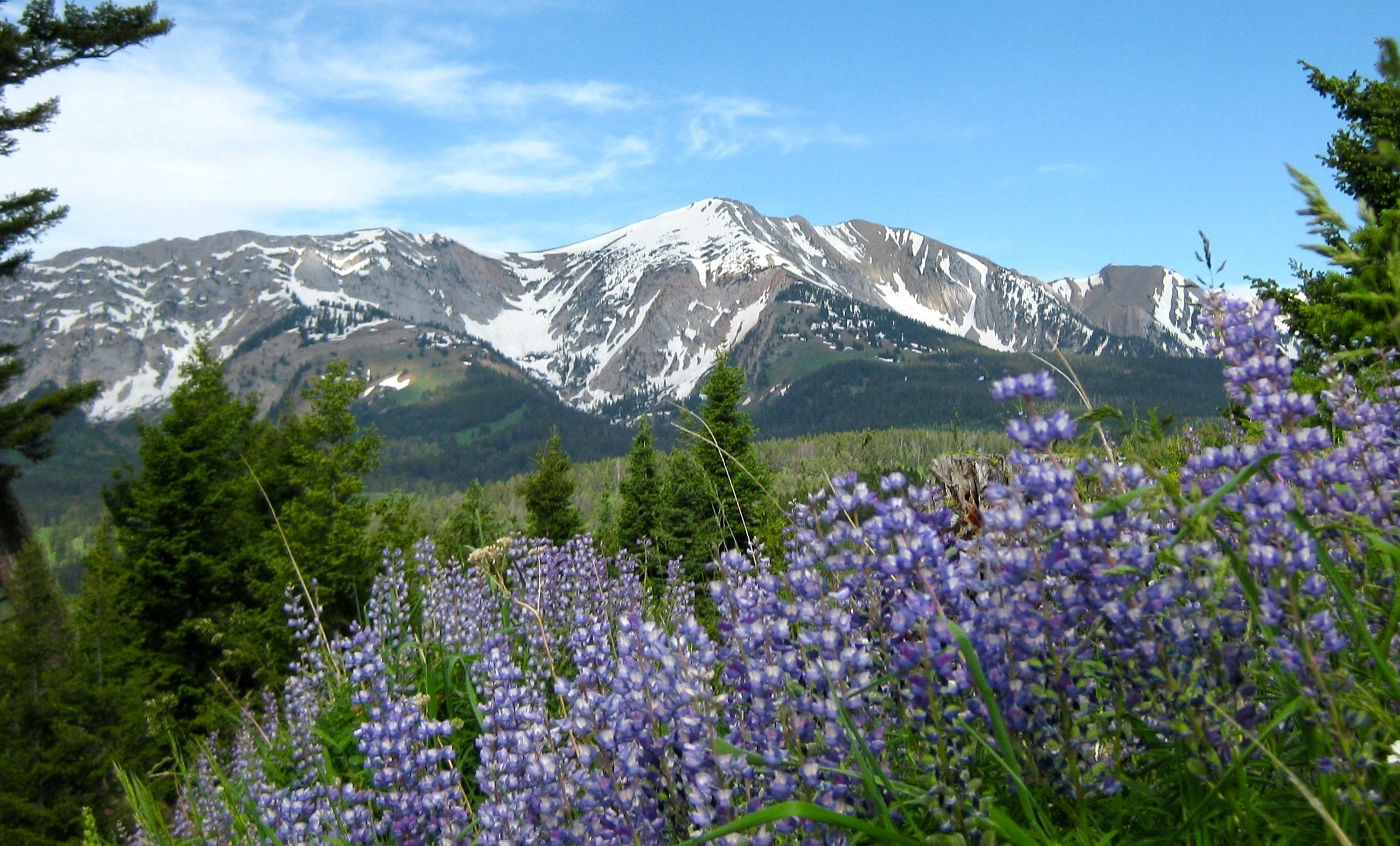
- East-southeast aspect, centered

Highest point
- Elevation: 9,591 ft (2,923 m)
- Prominence: 105 ft (32 m)
- Parent peak: Sacagawea Peak
- Isolation: 0.43 mi (0.69 km)
- Coordinates: 45°53′29″N 110°57′45″W

Geography
- Location within Montana Location within the United States
- Country: United States
- State: Montana
- County: Gallatin
- Protected area: Gallatin National Forest
- Parent range: Bridger Range; Rocky Mountains
- Topo map: USGS Sacagawea Peak

Geology
- Rock age: Mississippian
- Rock type: Limestone of Madison Group

Naya Nuki Peak is a 9,591-foot-elevation (2,923-meter) mountain summit in Gallatin County, Montana, United States.

== Description ==
Naya Nuki Peak is the second-highest peak in the Bridger Range which is a subrange of the Rocky Mountains. The peak is situated 15 miles (24 km) north of Bozeman in the Gallatin National Forest. Precipitation runoff from the mountain's east slopes drains into tributaries of the Shields River, whereas the west slope drains into tributaries of the East Gallatin River. Topographic relief is significant as the summit rises 2,000 feet (610 meters) above Fairy Lake in 0.85 miles (1.37 km) and 2,000 feet (610 meters) above North Fork Brackett Creek in 0.75 miles (1.21 km). This mountain's toponym was officially adopted in 1987 by the United States Board on Geographic Names as proposed by Bozeman school child Kristin Anderson to honor the real-life Shoshoni girl named Naya Nuki who was a friend of Sacagawea, the Shoshone Indian scout on the Lewis and Clark Expedition. Both Naya Nuki and Sacagawea were kidnapped in a raid, but Naya Nuki escaped captivity and travelled alone 1,000 miles to return to her tribe. Naya Nuki Peak is located less than one-half mile immediately southeast of Sacagawea Peak.

== Climate ==
According to the Köppen climate classification system, the mountain is located in an alpine subarctic climate zone with long, cold, snowy winters, and cool to warm summers. Winter temperatures can drop below 0 °F with wind chill factors below −10 °F. Due to its altitude, it receives precipitation all year, as snow in winter and as thunderstorms in summer.

== See also ==
- Geology of the Rocky Mountains

== Gallery ==
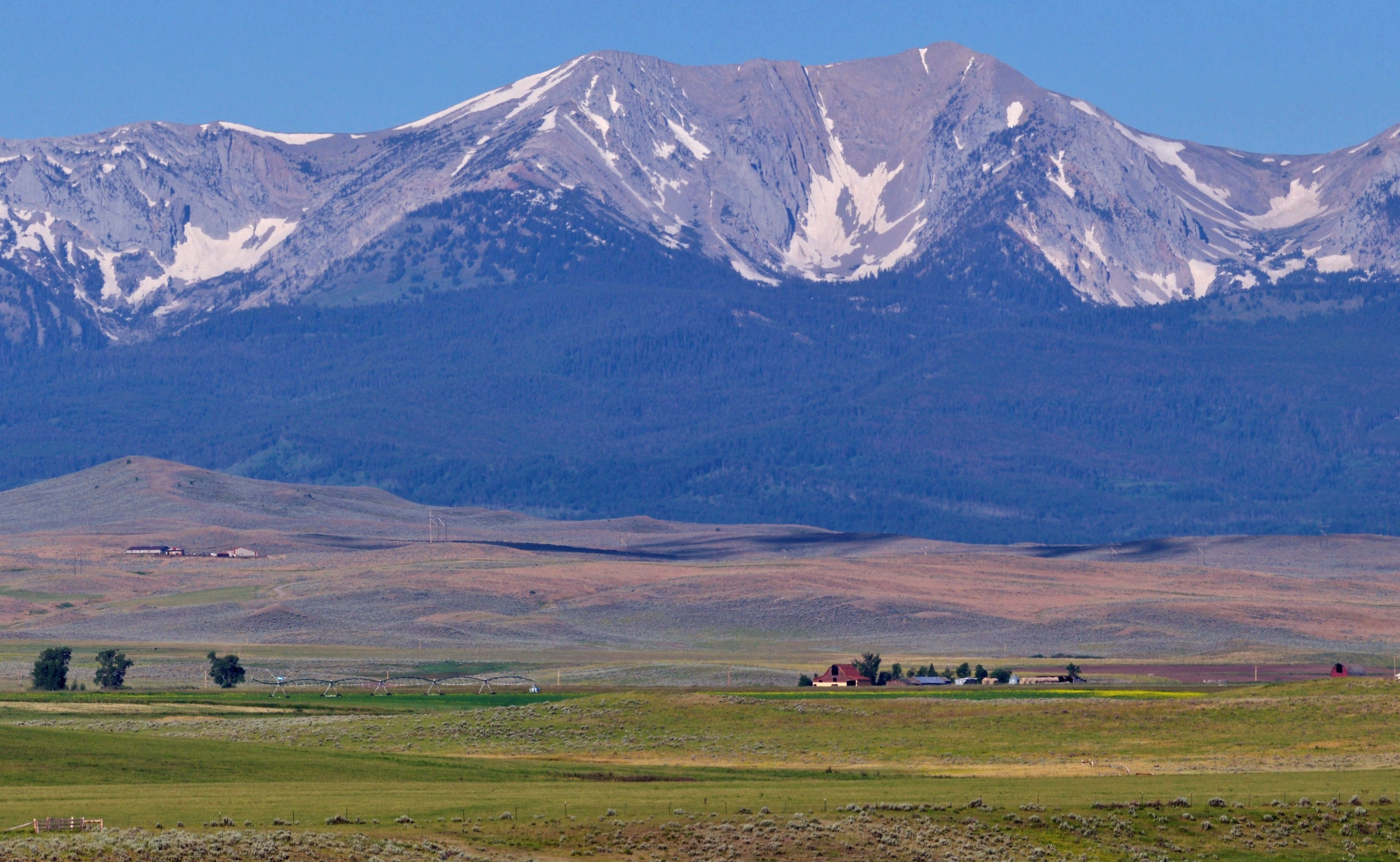
East aspect of Naya Nuki Peak (left) / Sacagawea Peak (right)

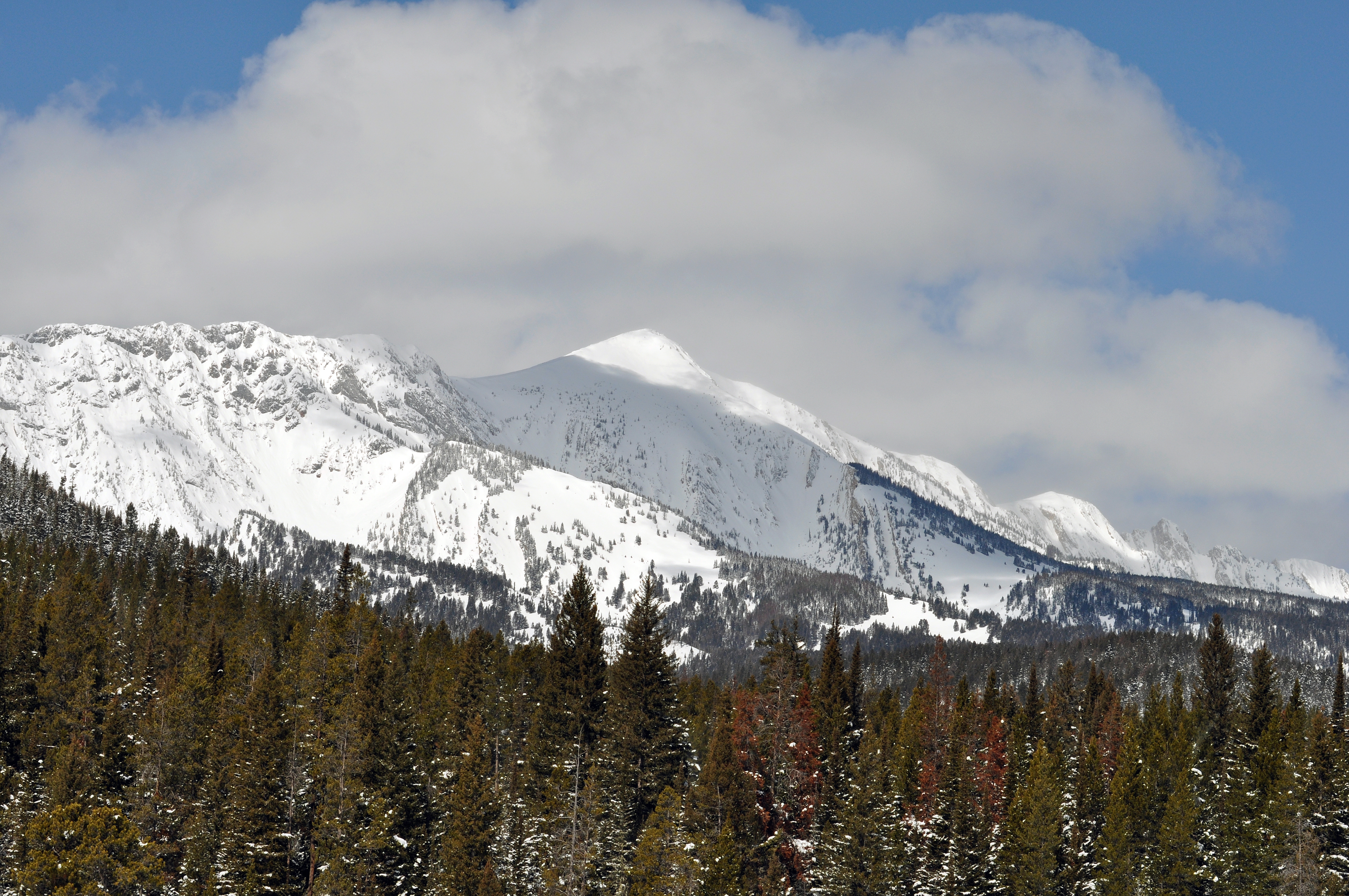
Southeast aspect

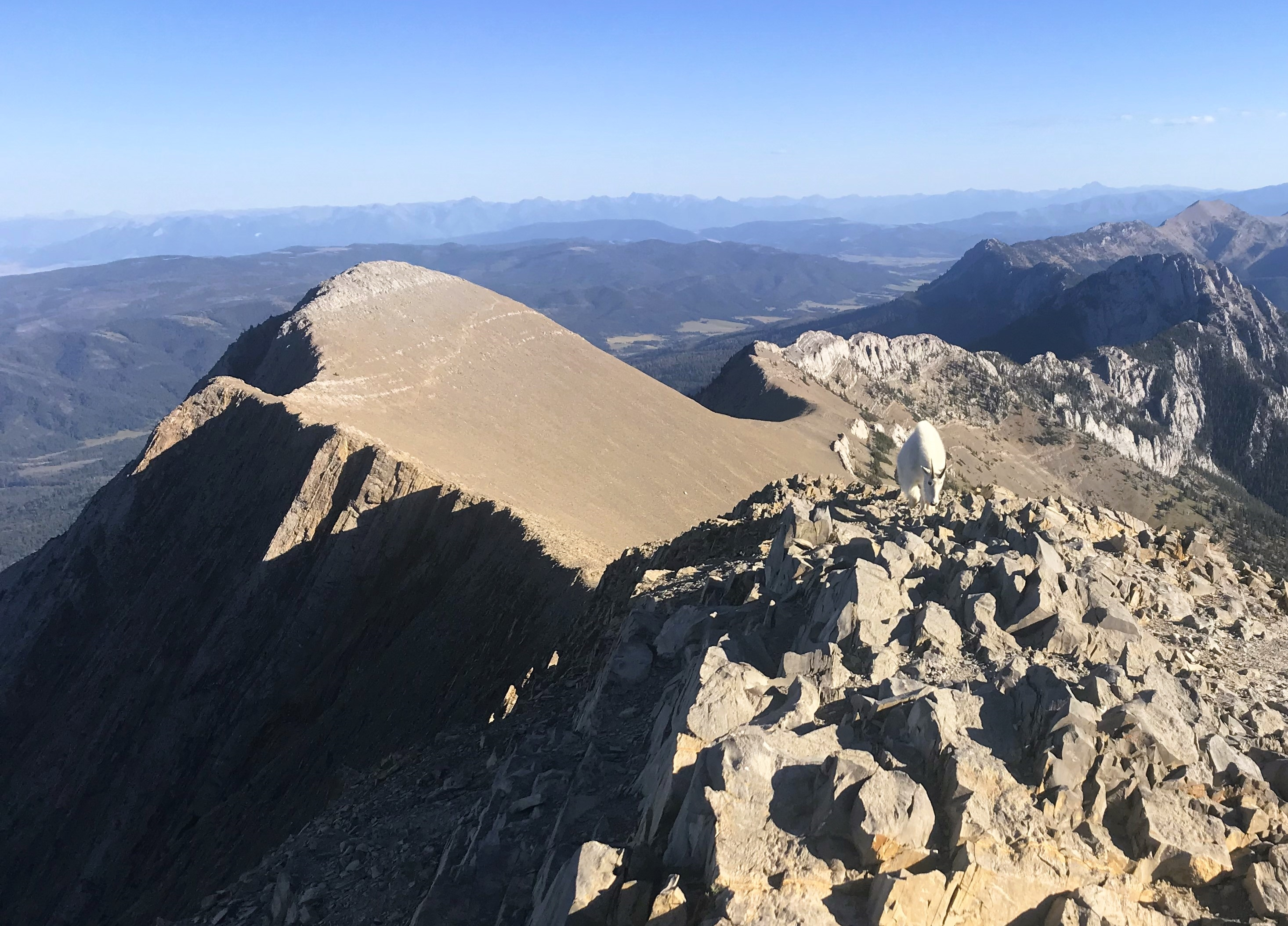
Naya Nuki Peak (left) viewed from Sacagawea Peak
