= Ross Peak =

Mountain in Montana, United States

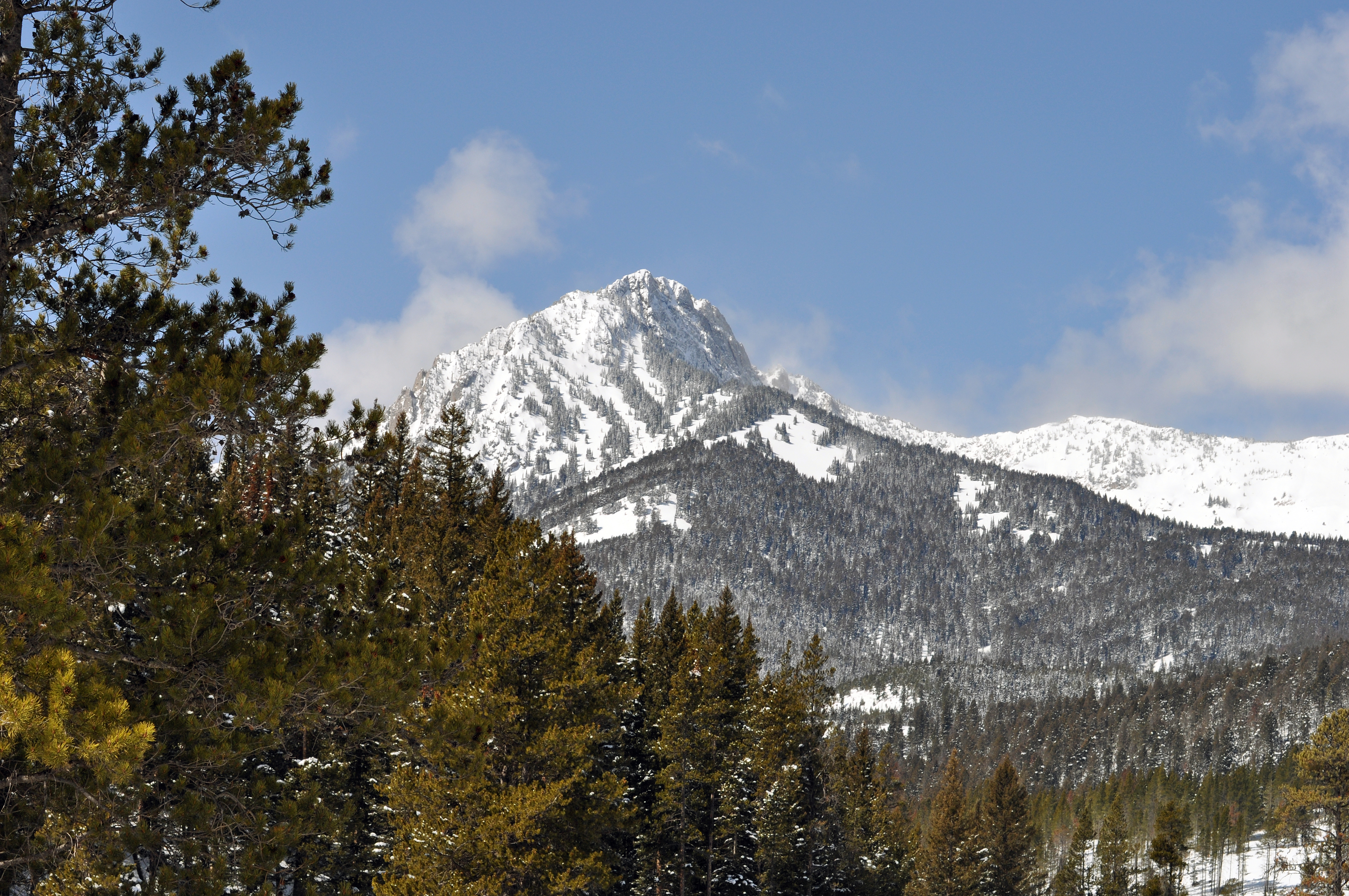
- East aspect

Highest point
- Elevation: 9,008 ft (2,746 m)
- Prominence: 621 ft (189 m)
- Parent peak: Sacagawea Peak
- Isolation: 1.54 mi (2.48 km)
- Coordinates: 45°51′31″N 110°57′22″W

Naming
- Etymology: Melvin Ross Sr.

Geography
- Location within Montana Location within the United States
- Country: United States
- State: Montana
- County: Gallatin
- Protected area: Gallatin National Forest
- Parent range: Bridger Range; Rocky Mountains
- Topo map: USGS Saddle Peak

Geology
- Rock age: Mississippian
- Rock type: Limestone of Madison Group

Ross Peak is a 9,008-foot-elevation (2,746-meter) mountain summit in Gallatin County, Montana, United States.

== Description ==
Ross Peak is the fourth-highest peak in the Bridger Range which is a subrange of the Rocky Mountains. The peak is situated 13 miles (21 km) north of Bozeman in the Gallatin National Forest. Precipitation runoff from the mountain's east slope drains to Brackett Creek → Shields River → Yellowstone River, whereas the west slope drains to Ross Creek → East Gallatin River → Gallatin River. Topographic relief is significant as the summit rises 3,000 feet (914 meters) above Ross Creek in one mile (1.6 km). This mountain's toponym has been officially adopted by the United States Board on Geographic Names. The mountain is named for Melvin Ross Sr. who settled in the area in 1864 and placed a flag at the summit which could be seen from many miles away.

== Climate ==
According to the Köppen climate classification system, the mountain is located in an alpine subarctic climate zone with long, cold, snowy winters, and cool to warm summers. Winter temperatures can drop below 0 °F with wind chill factors below −10 °F. Due to its altitude, it receives precipitation all year, as snow in winter and as thunderstorms in summer.

== See also ==
- Geology of the Rocky Mountains

== Gallery ==
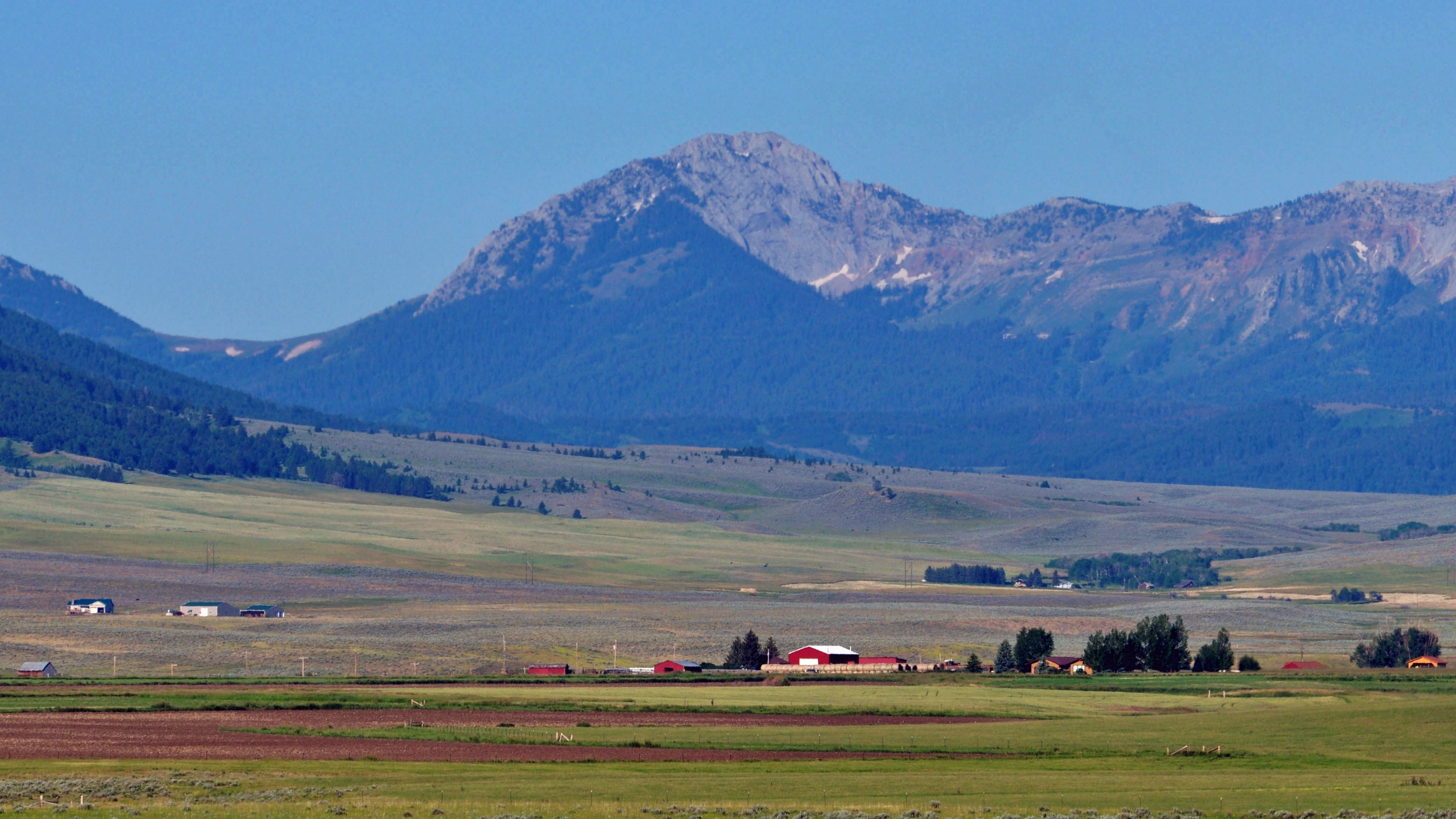
East aspect

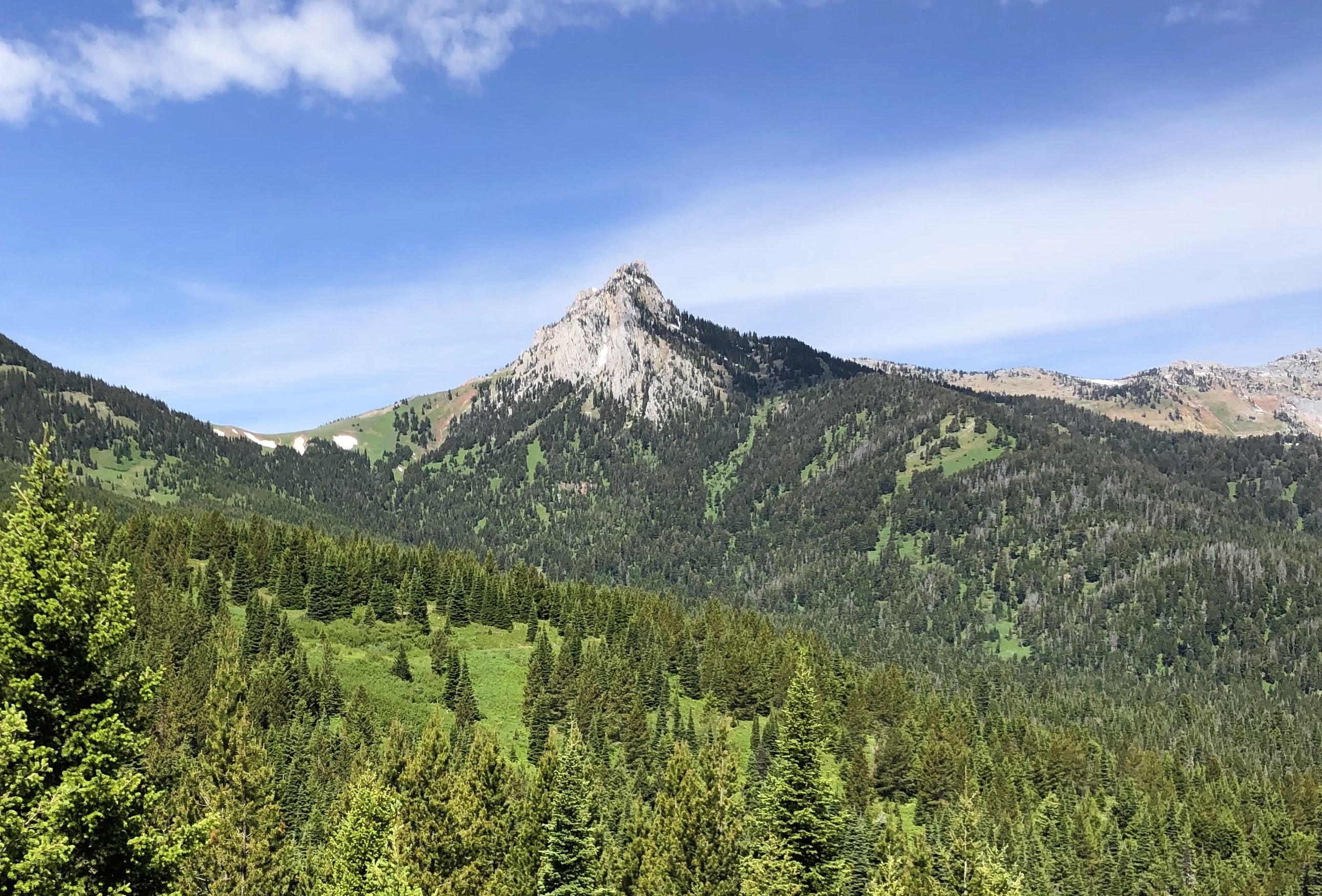
Southeast aspect

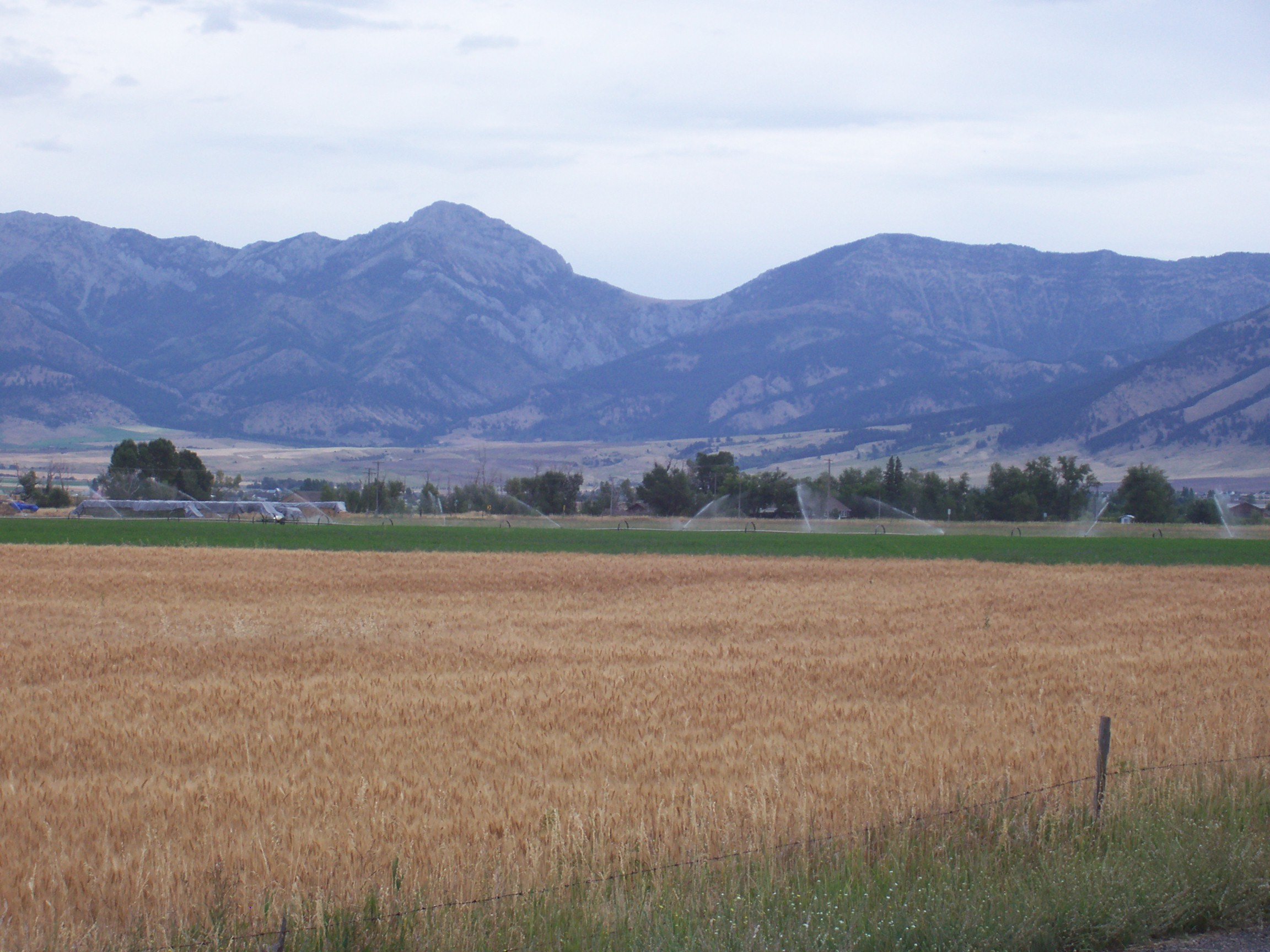
Ross Peak to left of center, from southwest

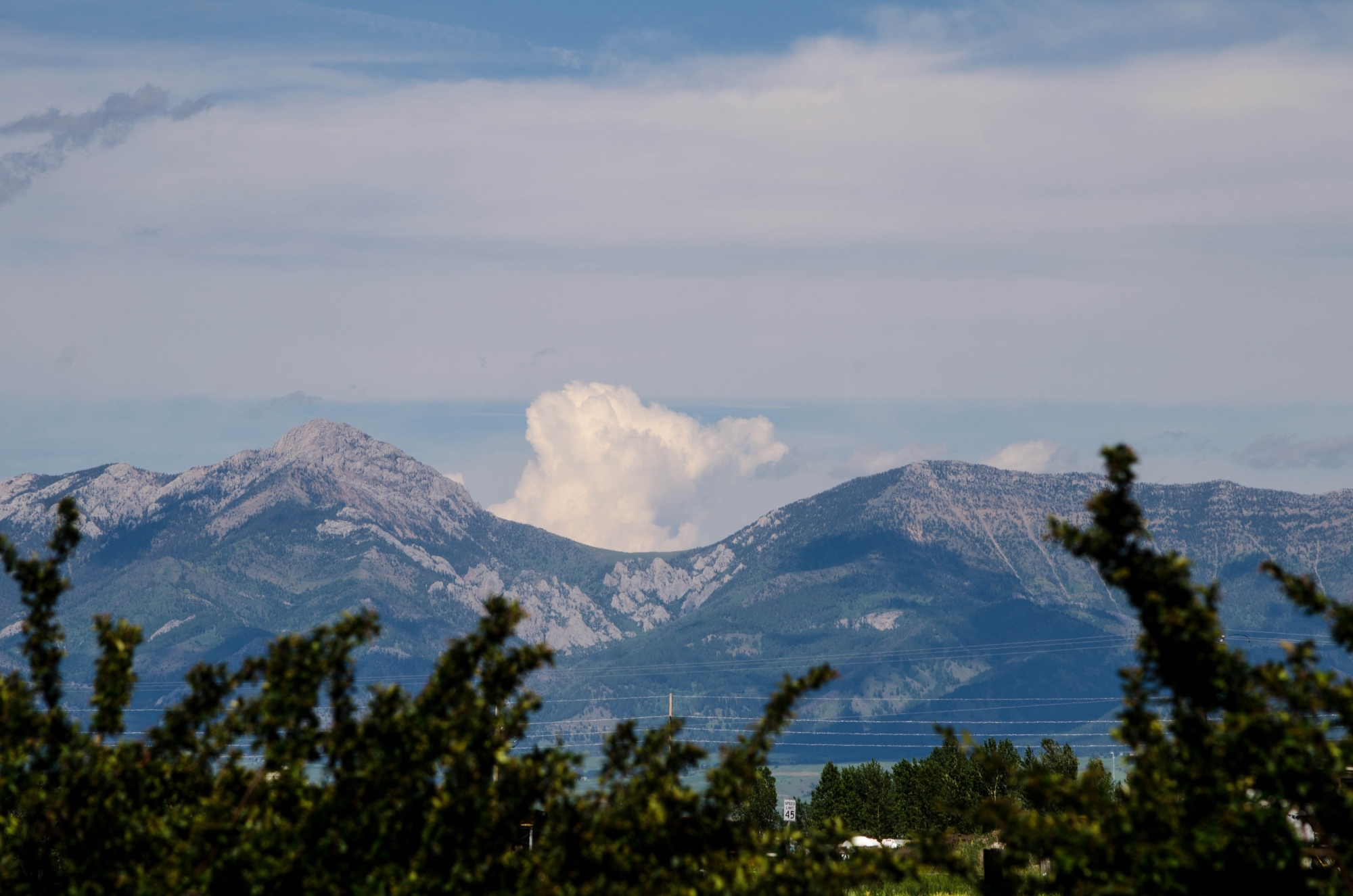
Ross Peak to left

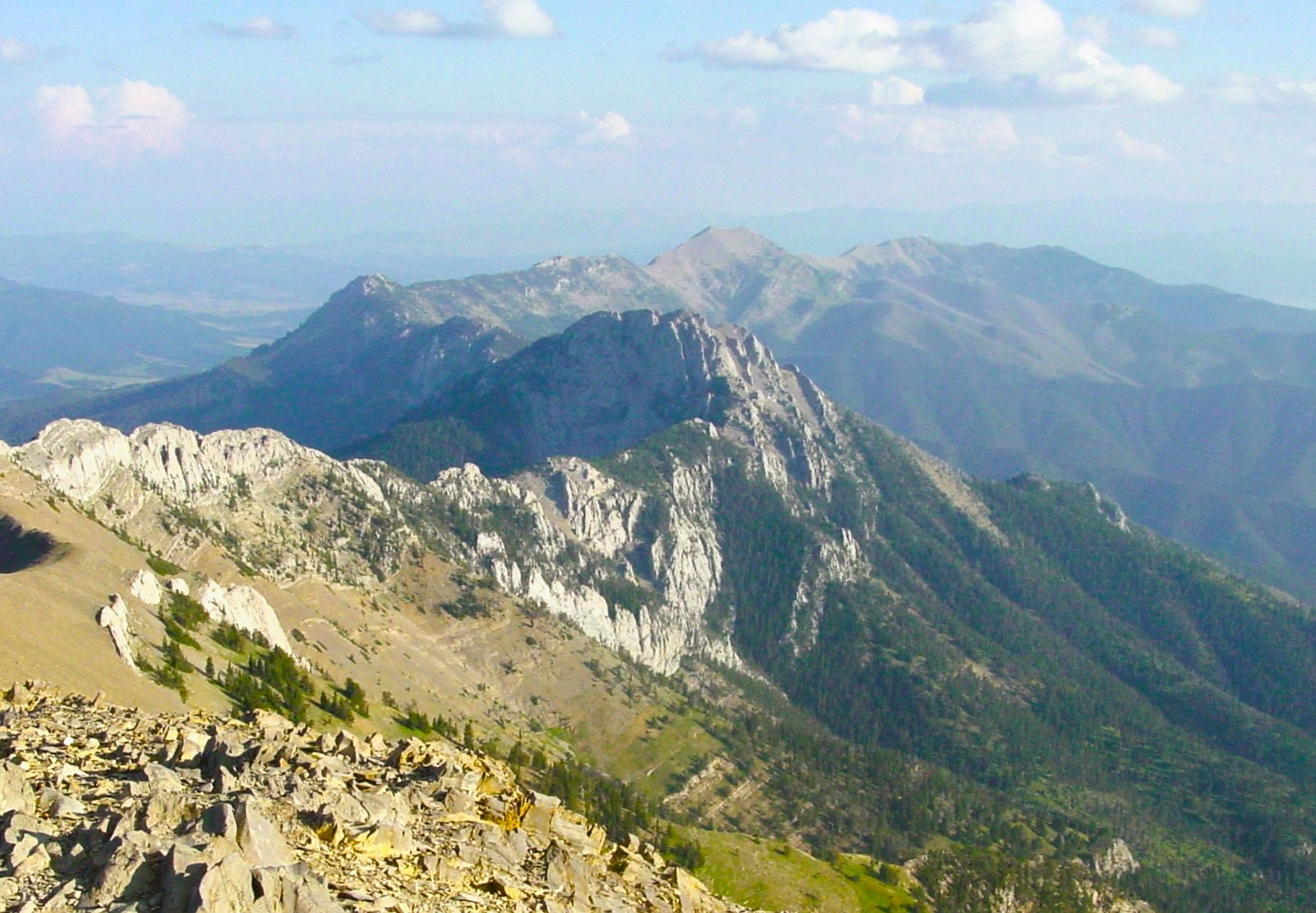
North aspect of Ross Peak (centered) as seen from Sacagawea Peak
