= Saddle Peak (Montana) =

Mountain in Montana, United States

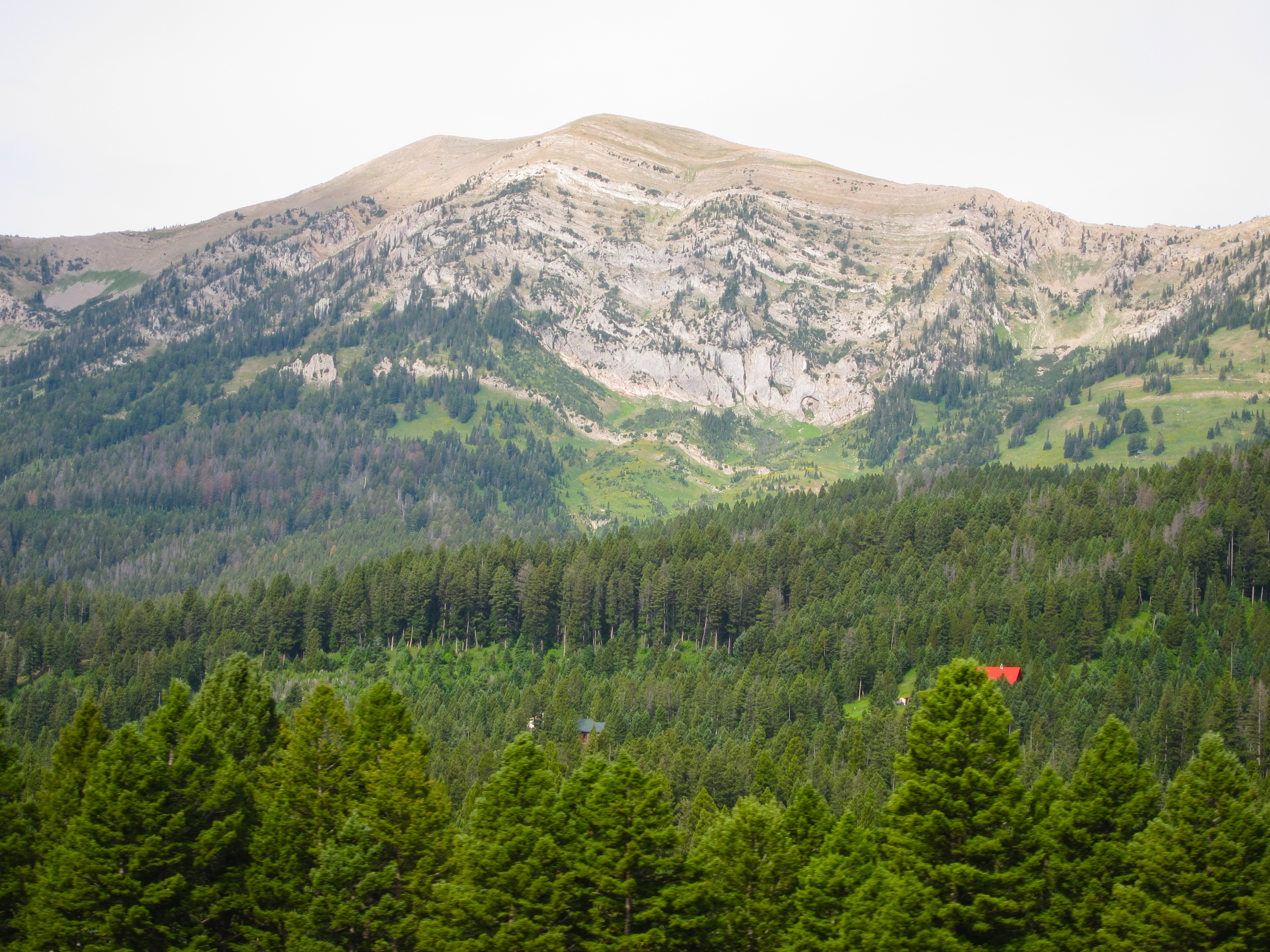
- Northeast aspect

Highest point
- Elevation: 9,159 ft (2,792 m)
- Prominence: 1,539 ft (469 m)
- Parent peak: Sacagawea Peak
- Isolation: 6.79 mi (10.93 km)
- Coordinates: 45°47′37″N 110°56′11″W

Geography
- Location within Montana Location within the United States
- Country: United States
- State: Montana
- County: Gallatin
- Protected area: Gallatin National Forest
- Parent range: Bridger Range; Rocky Mountains
- Topo map: USGS Saddle Peak

Geology
- Rock age: Mississippian
- Rock type: Limestone of Madison Group

Saddle Peak is a 9,159-foot-elevation (2,792-meter) mountain summit in Gallatin County, Montana, United States.

== Description ==
Saddle Peak is the sixth-highest peak in the Bridger Range which is a subrange of the Rocky Mountains. The peak is situated nine miles (14 km) north of Bozeman in the Gallatin National Forest. Precipitation runoff from the mountain's slopes drains into tributaries of the East Gallatin River. Topographic relief is significant as the summit rises 3,160 feet (963 meters) above Slushman Creek in 1.5 miles (2.4 km). This mountain's descriptive toponym has been officially adopted by the United States Board on Geographic Names.

== Climate ==
According to the Köppen climate classification system, the mountain is located in an alpine subarctic climate zone with long, cold, snowy winters, and cool to warm summers. Winter temperatures can drop below 0 °F with wind chill factors below −10 °F. Due to its altitude, it receives precipitation all year, as snow in winter and as thunderstorms in summer. This climate supports the Bridger Bowl Ski Area immediately northeast of the peak.

== See also ==
- Geology of the Rocky Mountains
