= Storm Castle =

Mountain in Montana

- Castle Peak, Castle Mountain
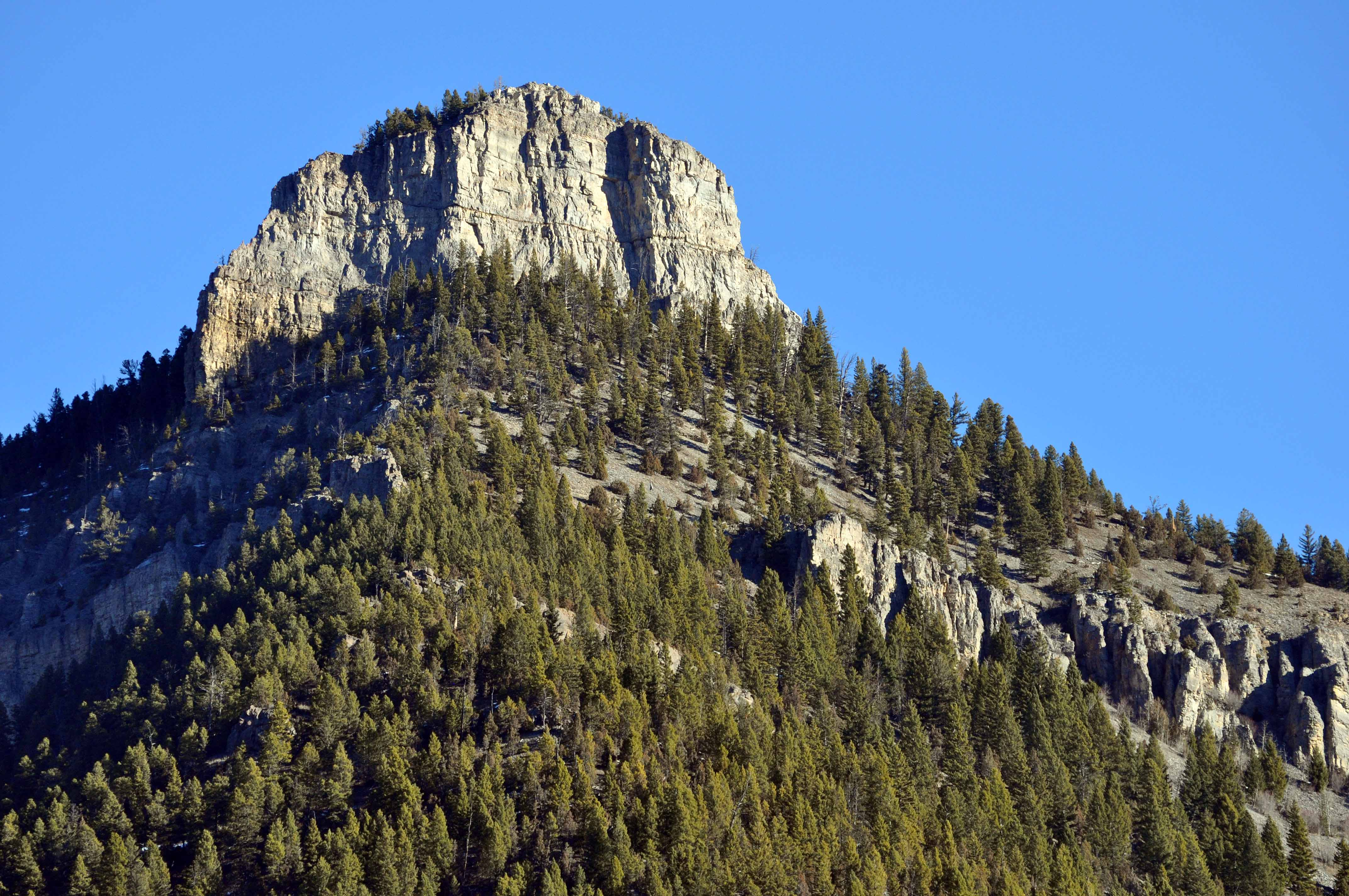
- Storm Castle

Highest point
- Elevation: 7,165 feet (2,184 m)
- Coordinates: 45°27′01″N 111°13′24″W

Geography
- Location within Montana
- Location: Gallatin County, Montana
- Parent range: Gallatin Range

Storm Castle, el. 7,165 feet (2,184 m) is a mountain peak in the Gallatin Range in Gallatin County, Montana. The peak is located in the Gallatin National Forest. Storm Castle is also known as Castle Peak or Castle Mountain. The peak is a popular 5-mile (8.0 km) round trip hike from the Storm Castle trailhead in the Gallatin Canyon.

== Gallery ==
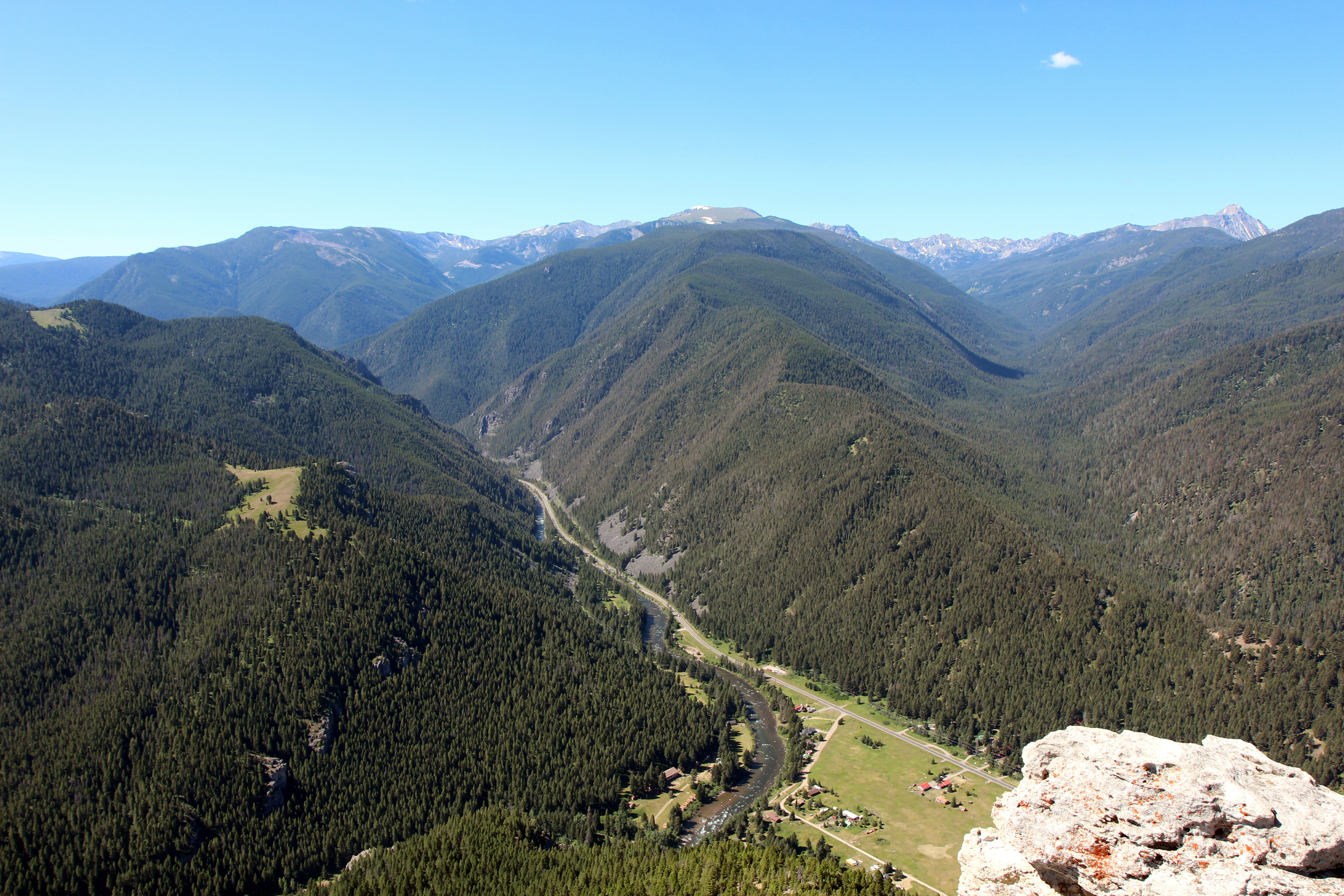
The view from on top of Storm Castle looking south.

== See also ==
- Mountains in Gallatin County, Montana
