= Fairy Lake =

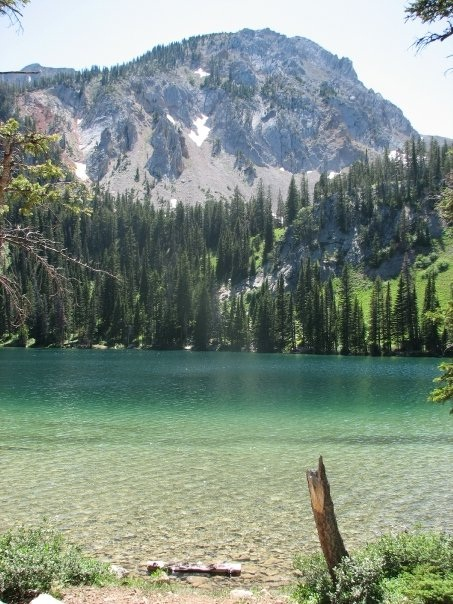

- Location within Montana Location within the United States
- Location: Gallatin County, Montana
- Coordinates: 45°54′16″N 110°57′32″W
- Type: Lake
- Primary inflows: Sacagawea Peak
- Basin countries: United States
- Surface elevation: 7,556 ft (2,303 m)

Fairy Lake is a lake in Gallatin County, Montana at the base of Sacagawea Peak, a part of the Bridger mountains in south central Montana. It is located within the northwestern section of the Gallatin National Forest and sits at an elevation of 7,557 ft (2,303 m).
