= Bridger Range =

Mountain range in the U.S. state of Montana

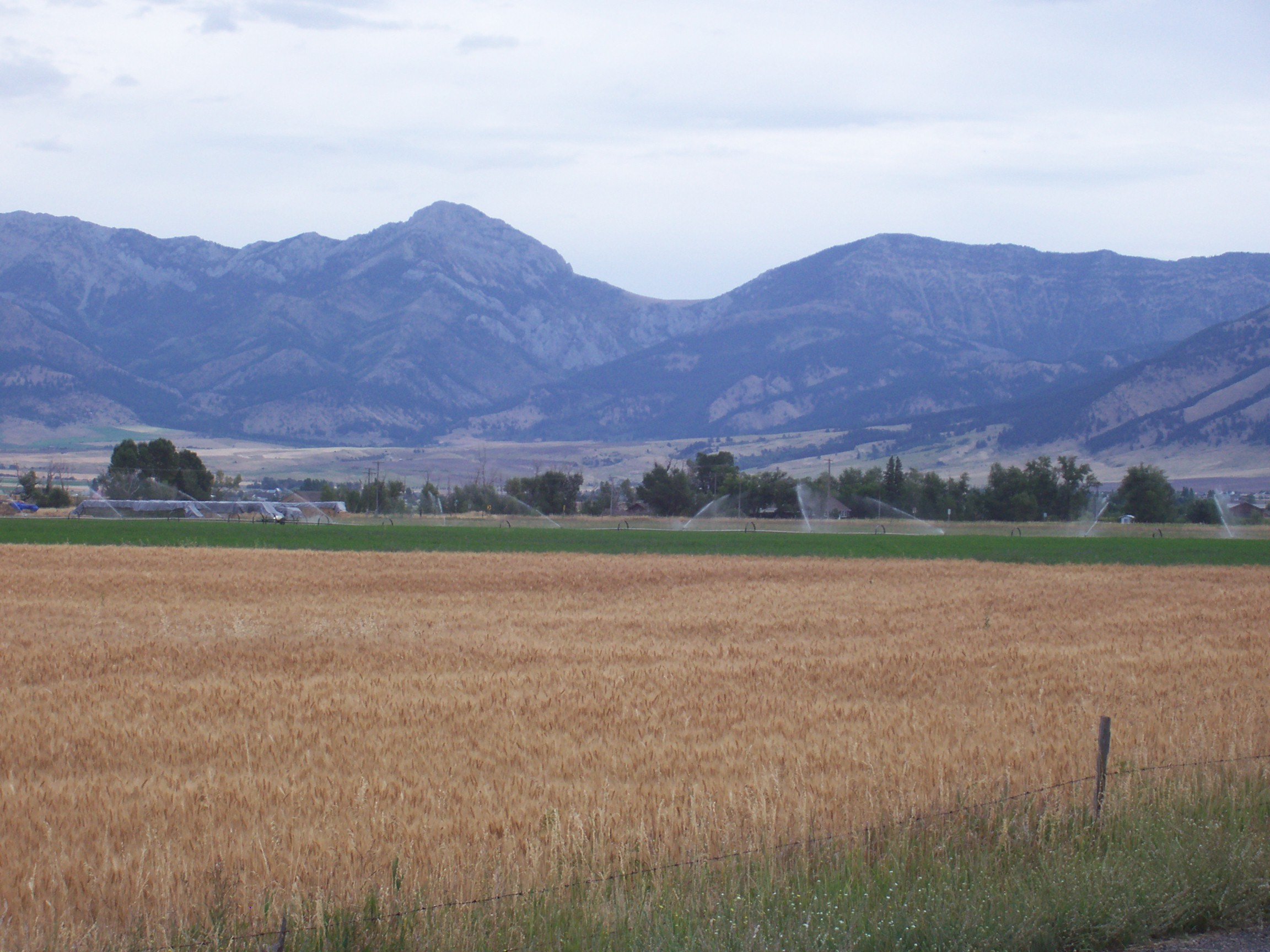
- West face of the Bridger Range

Highest point
- Peak: Sacagawea Peak
- Elevation: 9,596 ft (2,925 m)

Geography
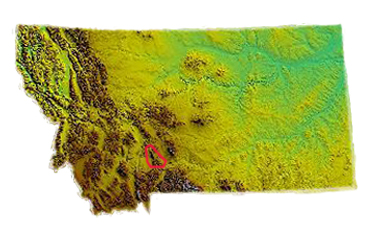
- Location within the state of Montana
- Country: United States
- State: Montana
- Range coordinates: 45°53.3′N 110°57.5′W
- Parent range: Rocky Mountains

The Bridger Range, also known as the Bridger Mountains, is a subrange of the Rocky Mountains in southwestern Montana in the United States. The range runs mostly in a north–south direction between Bozeman and Maudlow. It is separated from the Gallatin Range to the south by Bozeman Pass; from the Horseshoe Hills to the west by Dry Creek; from the Crazy Mountains to the east by the Shields River valley; and from the Big Belt Mountains to the north by Sixteen Mile Creek. The highest point in the Bridger Range is Sacagawea Peak (9,596 feet (2,925 m)), which is visible to the northeast from Bozeman.

Although the range is mostly in Gallatin County, a small portion extends into Park County. Bozeman Pass, at an elevation of 5,712 feet (1,741 m), is a narrow pass that lies between Bozeman and Livingston. The entire range is within Gallatin National Forest.

== History ==
The range is named after Jim Bridger (James Felix Bridger, 1804-1881) a 19th Century mountain man. Bridger pioneered the Bridger Trail, an alternative to the Bozeman Trail, in 1864. Both took settlers from the Oregon/California/Mormon Trail in southern Wyoming to the gold fields in Montana territory, especially Virginia City. While the Bozeman Trail went east of the Bighorn Mountains in more dangerous territory, Jim Bridger veered settlers west of the range and into the Bighorn Basin. The trail then crossed today's Montana-Wyoming border south of Bridger, Montana, also named for Jim. Another key place where the trails diverged is heading west into the Gallatin Valley. While John Bozeman's trail crossed roughly at today's Bozeman Pass, Jim Bridger took settlers a short way up the Shields Valley, then through the Bracket Creek cutoff, and down through Bridger Canyon. This route is longer but not as arduously steep as the pass. From this segment of his trail, the canyon and Bridger Range to its west were named after the mountain man.

On January 10, 1938, Northwest Airlines Flight 2 crashed in the Bridger Mountains, killing all 10 aboard. This was the first fatal crash of a Northwest Airlines aircraft.

== Prominent peaks ==
The most prominent peaks in the Bridgers include:

- Sacagawea Peak, 45°53′44″N 110°58′08″W, 9,596 feet (2,925 m)
- Pomp Peak, 45°54′18″N 110°58′36″W, 9,567 feet (2,916 m)
- Hardscrabble Peak, 45°54′52″N 110°58′57″W, 9,527 feet (2,904 m)
- Naya Nuki Peak, 45°53′30″N 110°57′43″W, 9,449 feet (2,880 m)
- Saddle Peak, 45°47′37″N 110°56′12″W, 9,134 feet (2,784 m)
- Ross Peak, 45°51′31″N 110°57′22″W, 9,012 feet (2,747 m)
- Mount Baldy, 45°44′00″N 110°57′33″W, 8,855 feet (2,699 m)
- Bridger Peak, 45°46′46″N 110°56′20″W, 8,583 feet (2,616 m)
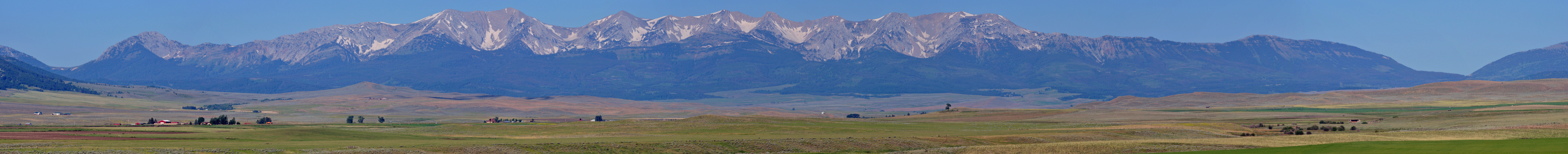
East face of Bridger Range
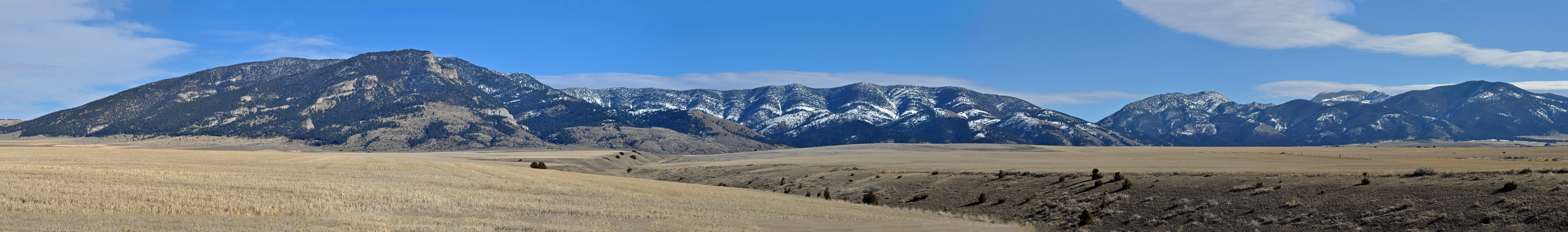
Northwest face of Bridger Range

== Recreation ==
=== Skiing ===
The Bridger Range is also home to the ski area Bridger Bowl. With the first rope tow installed in 1951, Bridger Bowl quickly became a popular mountain with the locals. The area has a top elevation of 8700 feet and a base elevation of 6100 feet. On average the ski area receives 350 inches (890 cm) of snow every year. Backcountry skiing is also very popular in the Bridgers, with snow being available on peaks such as Sacagawea from early November until late May/early June. Beginning in the 2008–2009 ski season, Bridger Bowl started to allow backcountry travel from the ski area via access gates on the northern and southern boundaries.

=== Hiking ===
Though many hiking trails exist, Sacagawea Peak is a favorite hiking area in the Bridgers. The hike is a short but strenuous 2.2-mile (3.5 km) one-way trek through pine forest, alpine tundra and scree fields to the top of Sacagawea Peak. The Bridger Ridge Run is a 20-mile (32 km) race which takes place in mid-August. The race follows the ridgeline from Fairy Lake to the southern end of the range.

Images of the Bridger Range

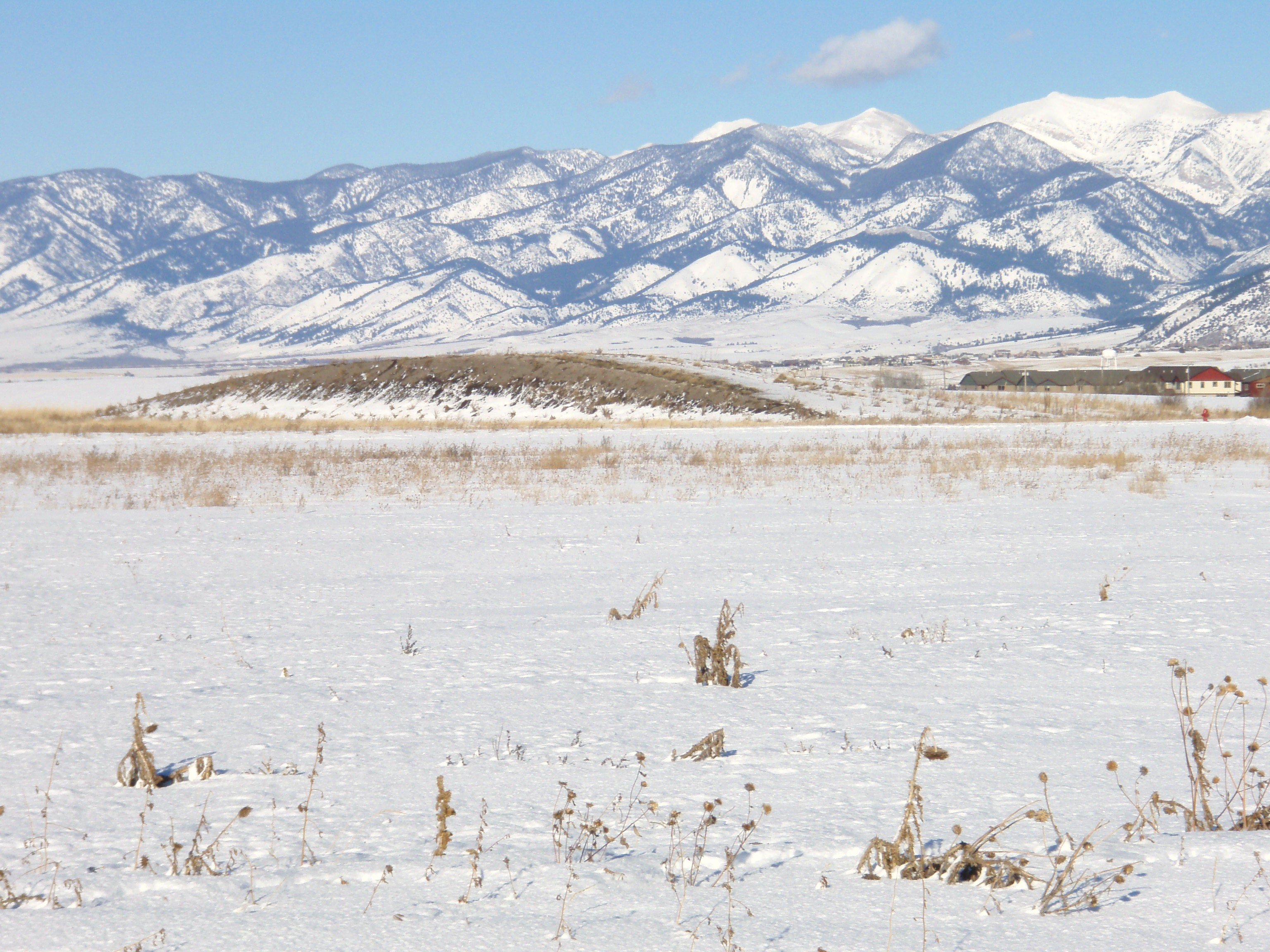
Bridger Range as seen from Bozeman, January 2009

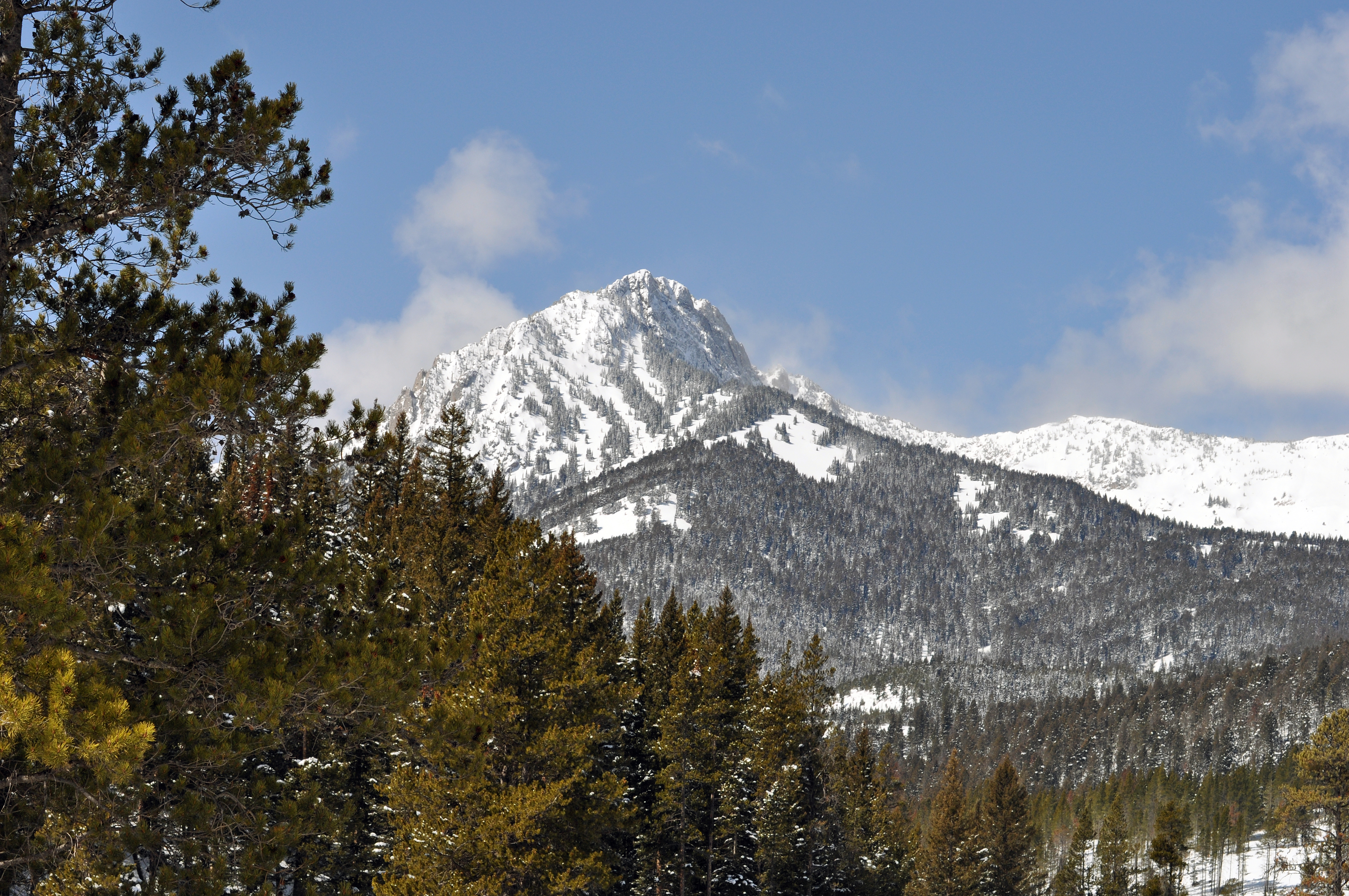
Ross Peak, Bridger Range, April 2010

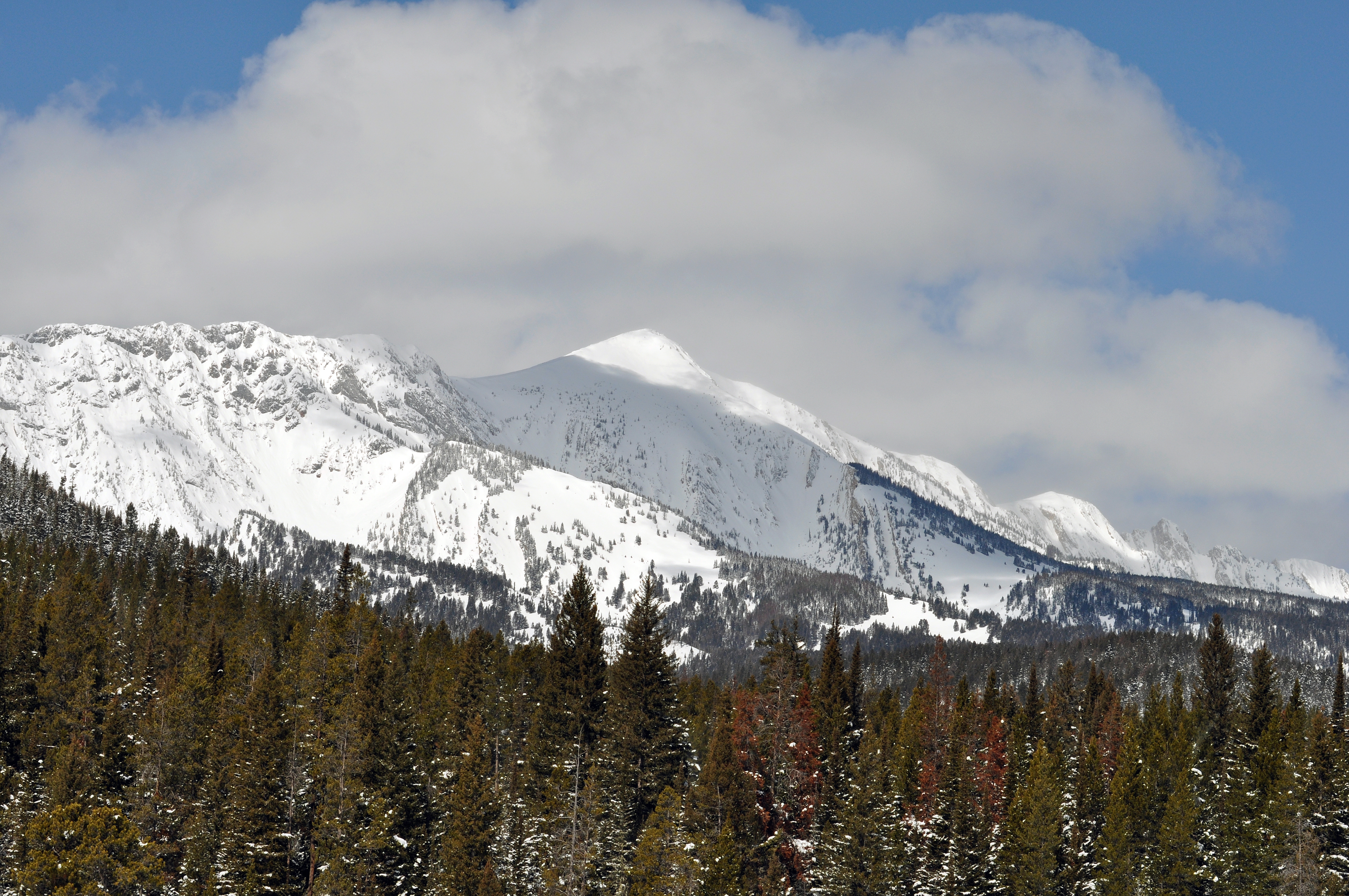
Sacagawea Peak (right) and Naya Nuki Peak (left), April 2010

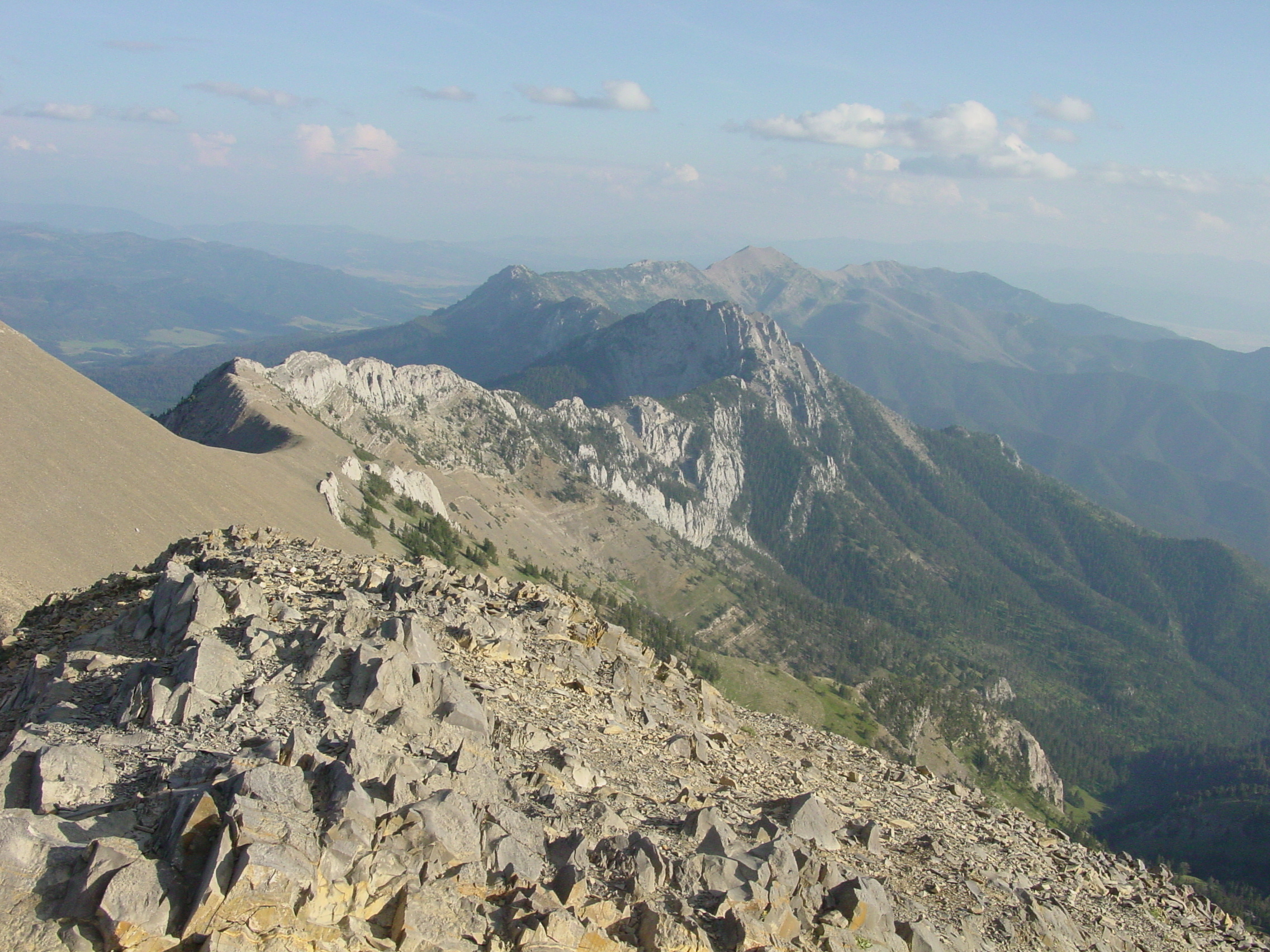
View of the Bridger Range looking south from the summit of Sacagawea Peak

== See also ==
- List of mountain ranges in Montana
