= East Gallatin River =

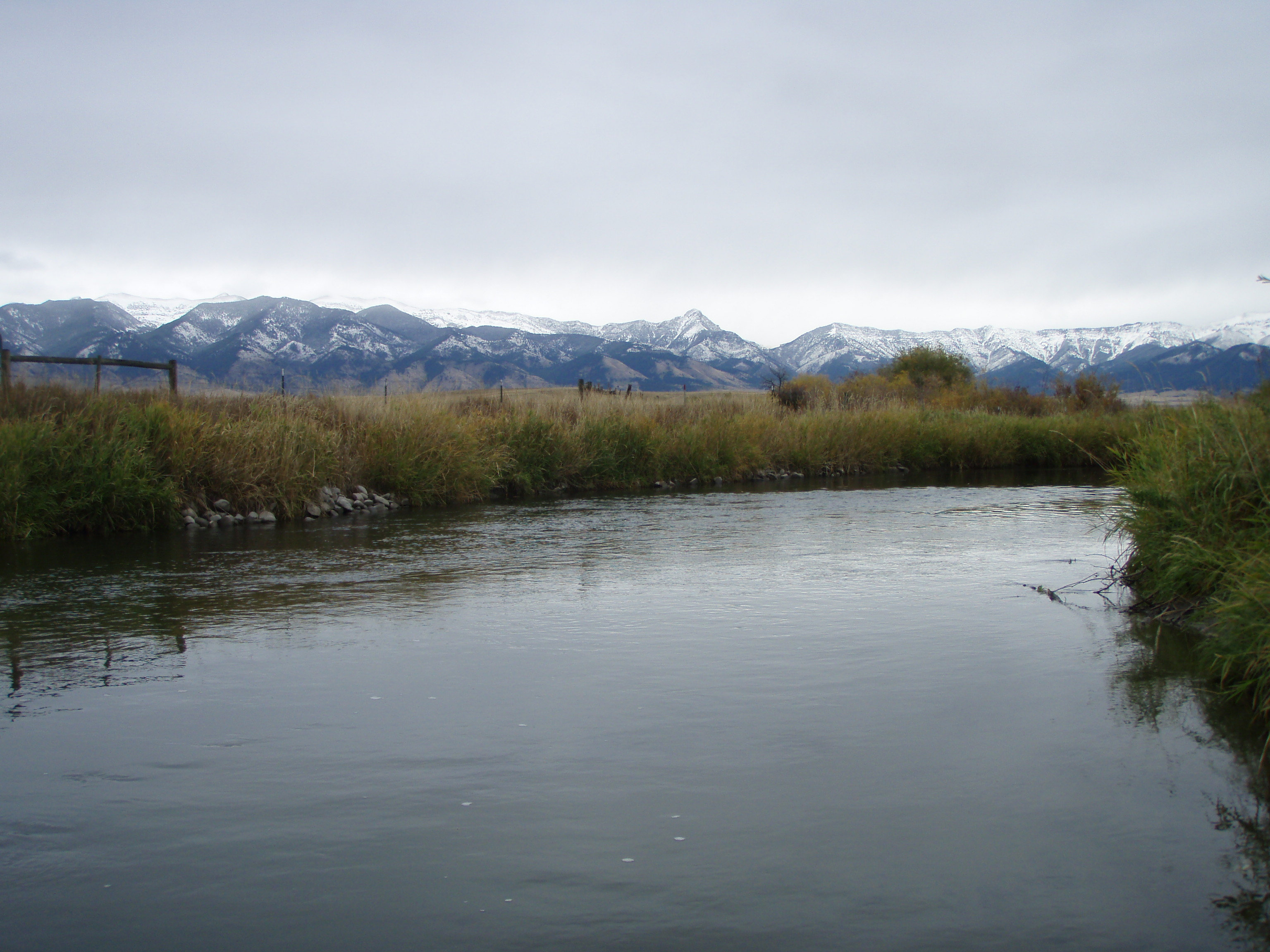
- East Gallatin River near Belgrade, Montana

- Location of mouth

Location
- Country: United States
- State: Montana
- County: Gallatin

Physical characteristics
- Source
  - coordinates: 45°39′51″N 110°57′10″W
- Mouth
  - location: Nixon Gap
  - coordinates: 45°53′30″N 111°20′01″W
  - elevation: 4,157 feet (1,267 m)
- Length: 42 miles (68 km)
- Basin size: 148 square miles (380 km^{2}) (Gallatin Range, Bridger Range)
- Discharge
  - location: Belgrade
  - average: 137 cu/ft. per sec.

Basin features
- River system: Missouri River

The East Gallatin River flows 42 miles (68 km) in a northwesterly direction through the Gallatin valley, Gallatin County, Montana. Rising from the confluence of Rocky Creek and several other small streams, the East Gallatin begins about one mile (1.6 km) east of downtown Bozeman, Montana. The river joins the main stem of the Gallatin River 2.3 miles (3.7 km) north of Manhattan, Montana. Throughout its course, the river traverses mostly valley floor ranch and farmland with typical summer flows of approximately 50 cu ft/s (1.4 m^{3}/s).

== Angling the East Gallatin ==
The East Gallatin River is a popular trout fishing stream and holds good populations of rainbow and brown trout as well as mountain whitefish. Access is limited to country road crossings, and two public assess sites maintained by the Montana Fish, Wildlife and Parks department. Numerous spring creeks, most notably Ben Hart and Thompson, feed the East Gallatin throughout its course and provide excellent trout fishing as well.

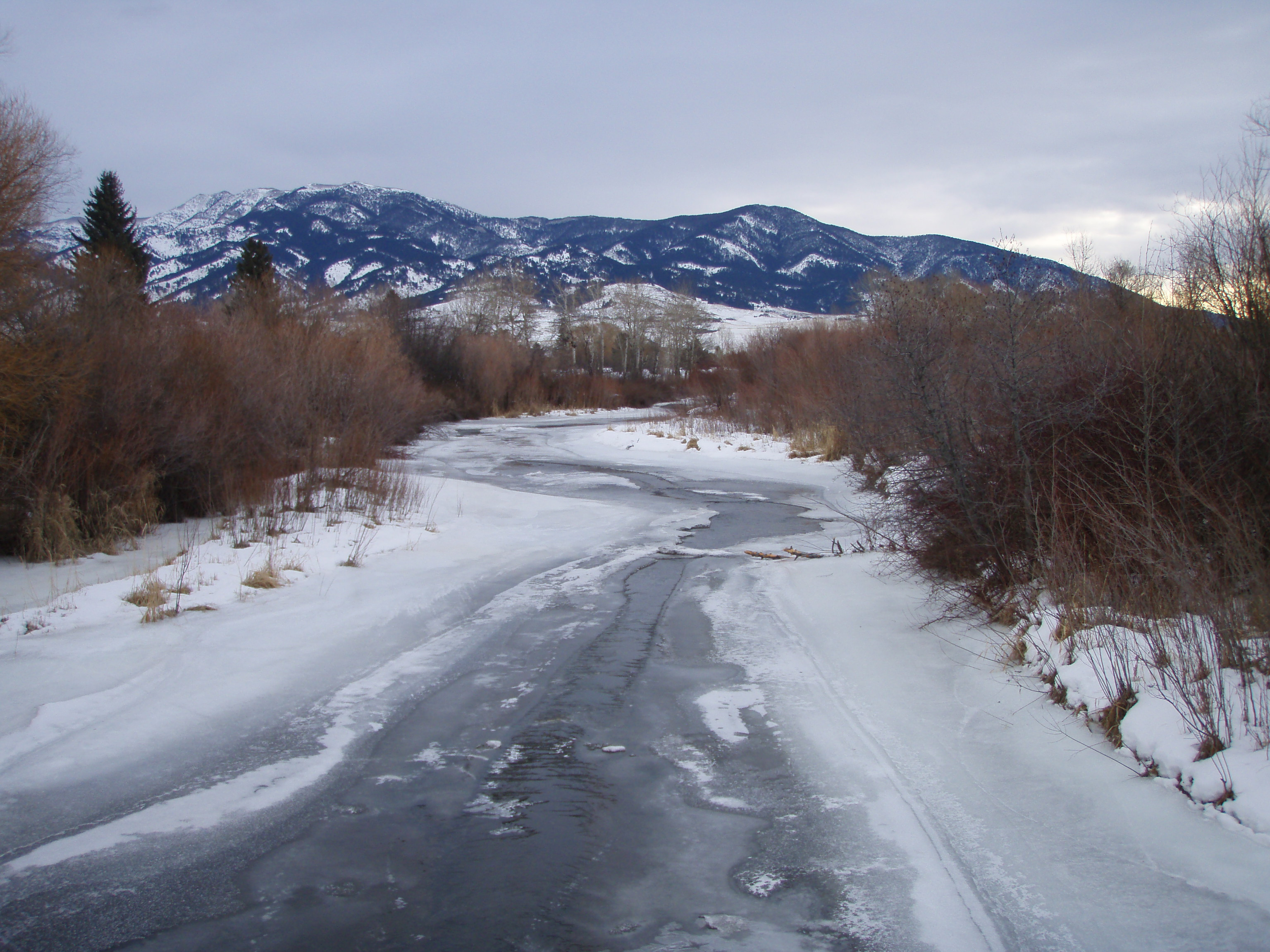
East Gallatin River near Bozeman, Montana in Winter

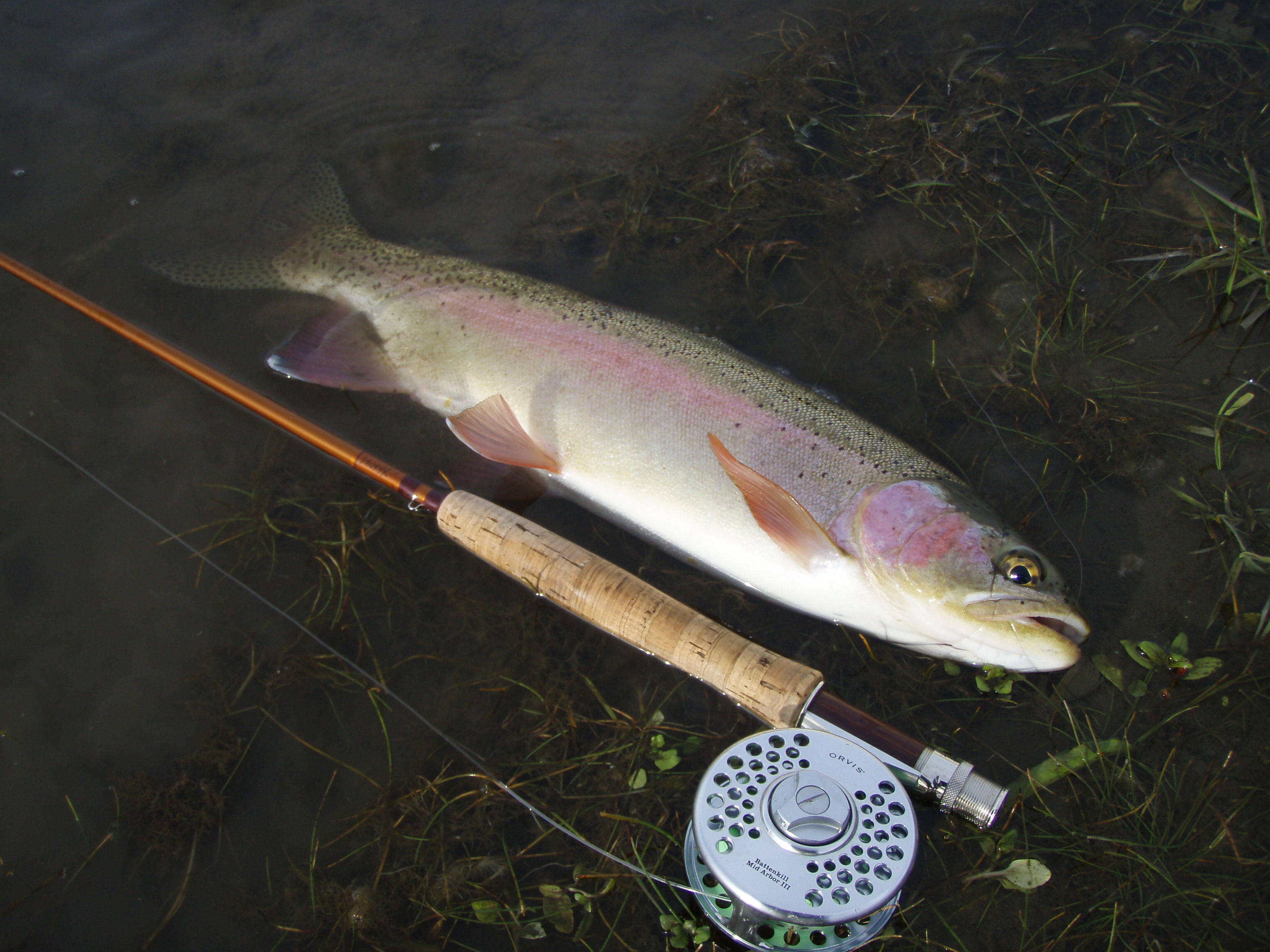
Typical East Gallatin River rainbow trout (Released)

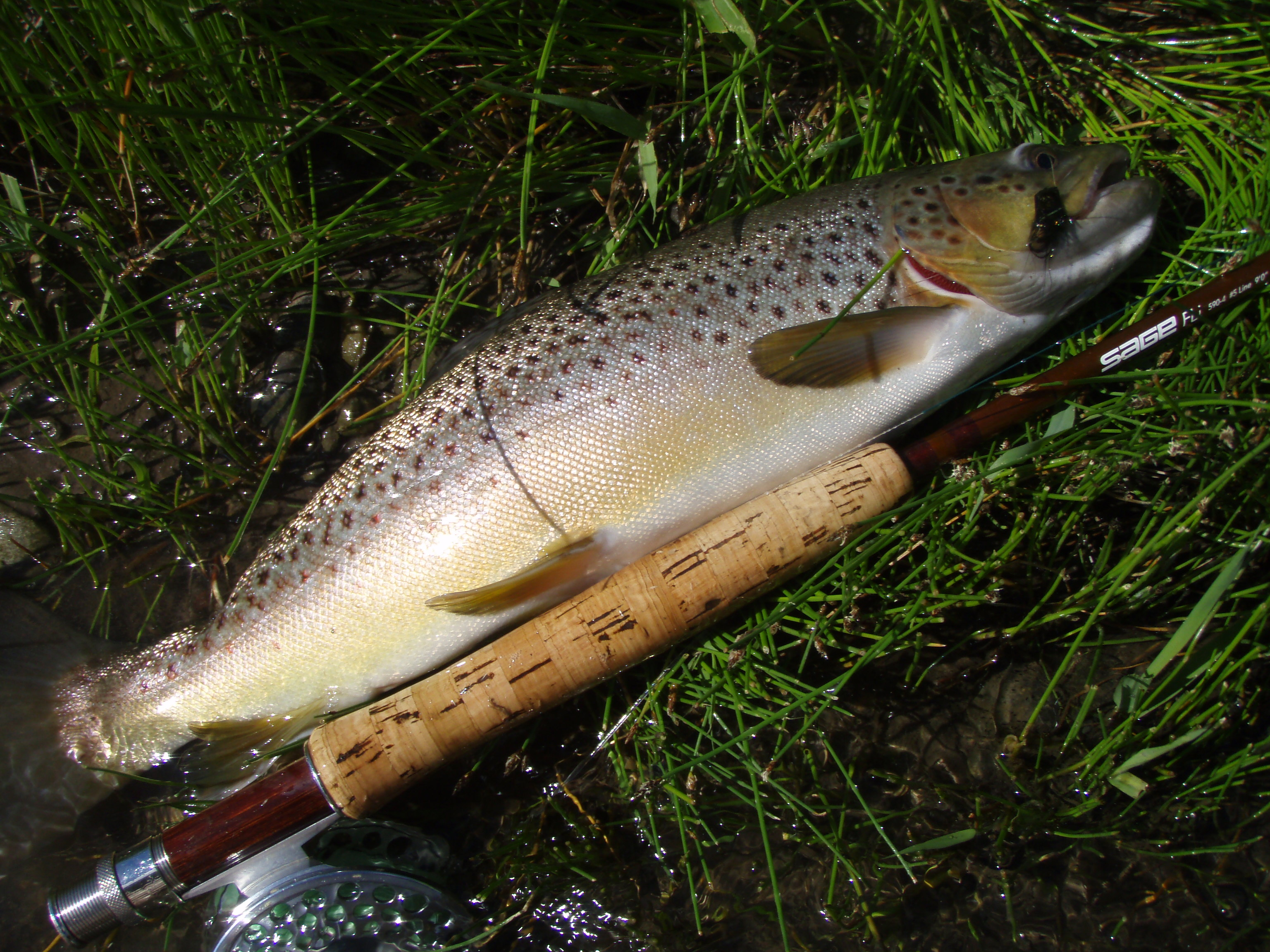
Typical East Gallatin River brown trout (Released)

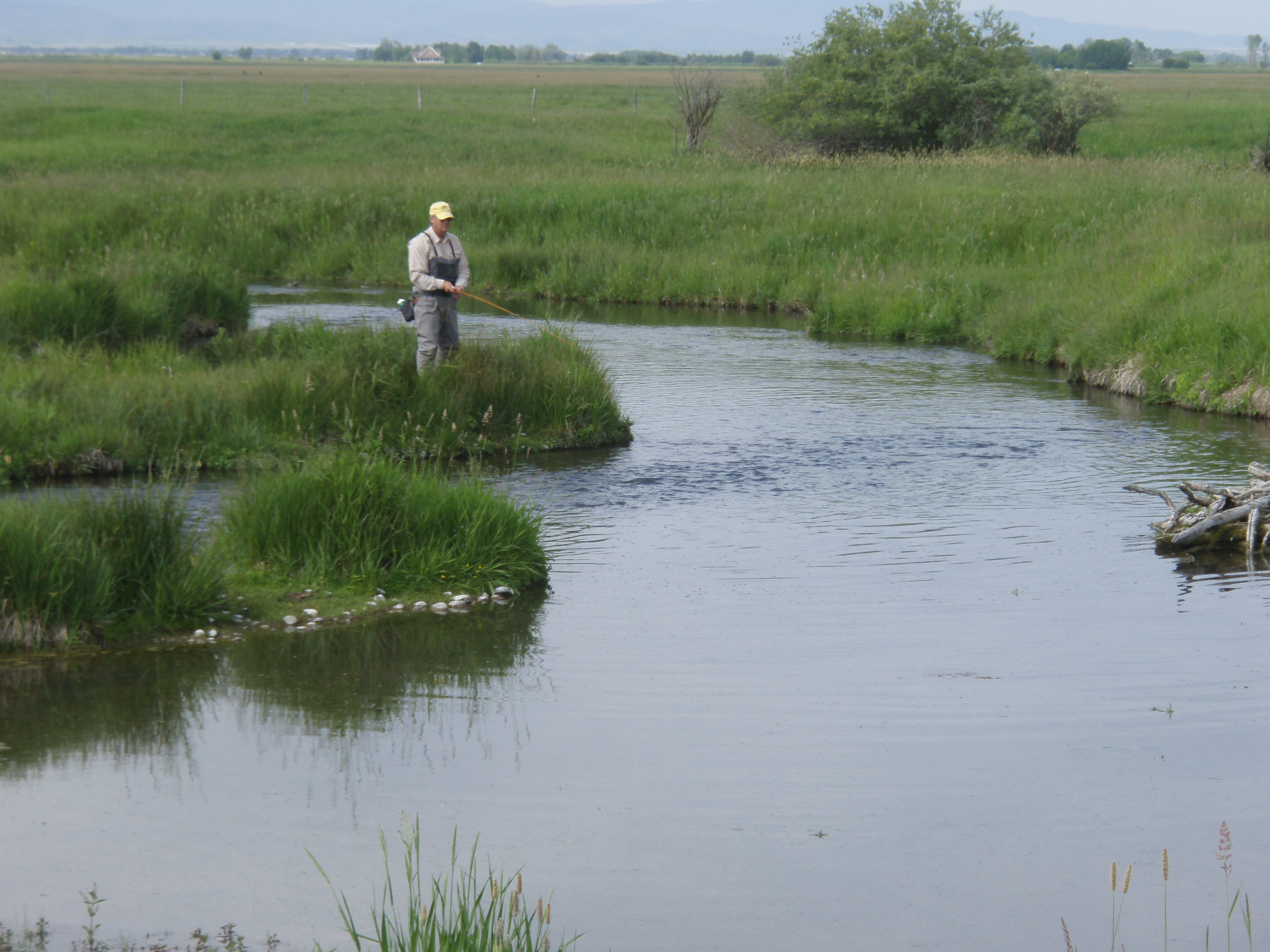
Ben Hart Spring Creek on the MZ Ranch near Belgrade, MT

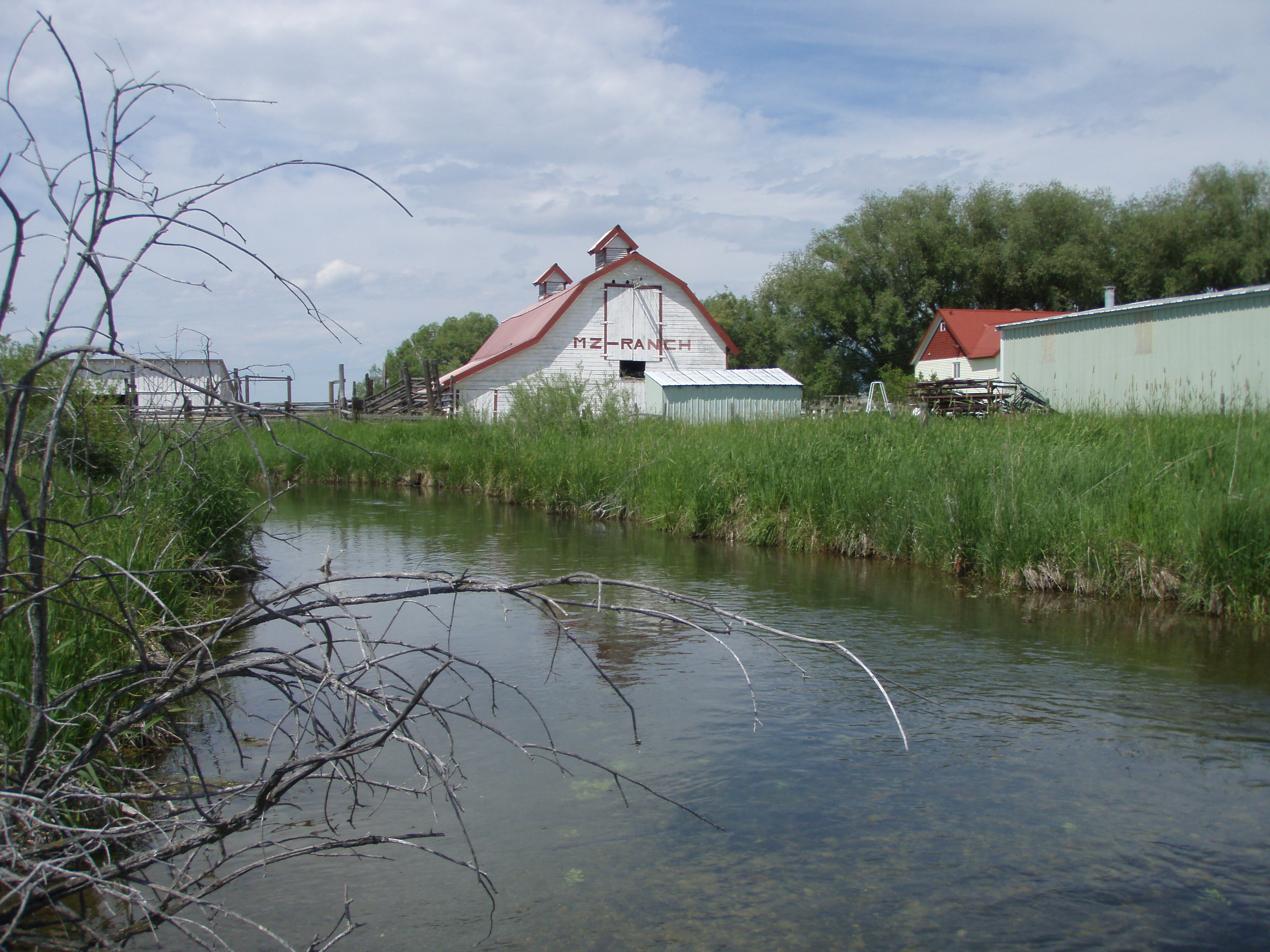
Thompson Spring Creek on the MZ Ranch near Belgrade, MT

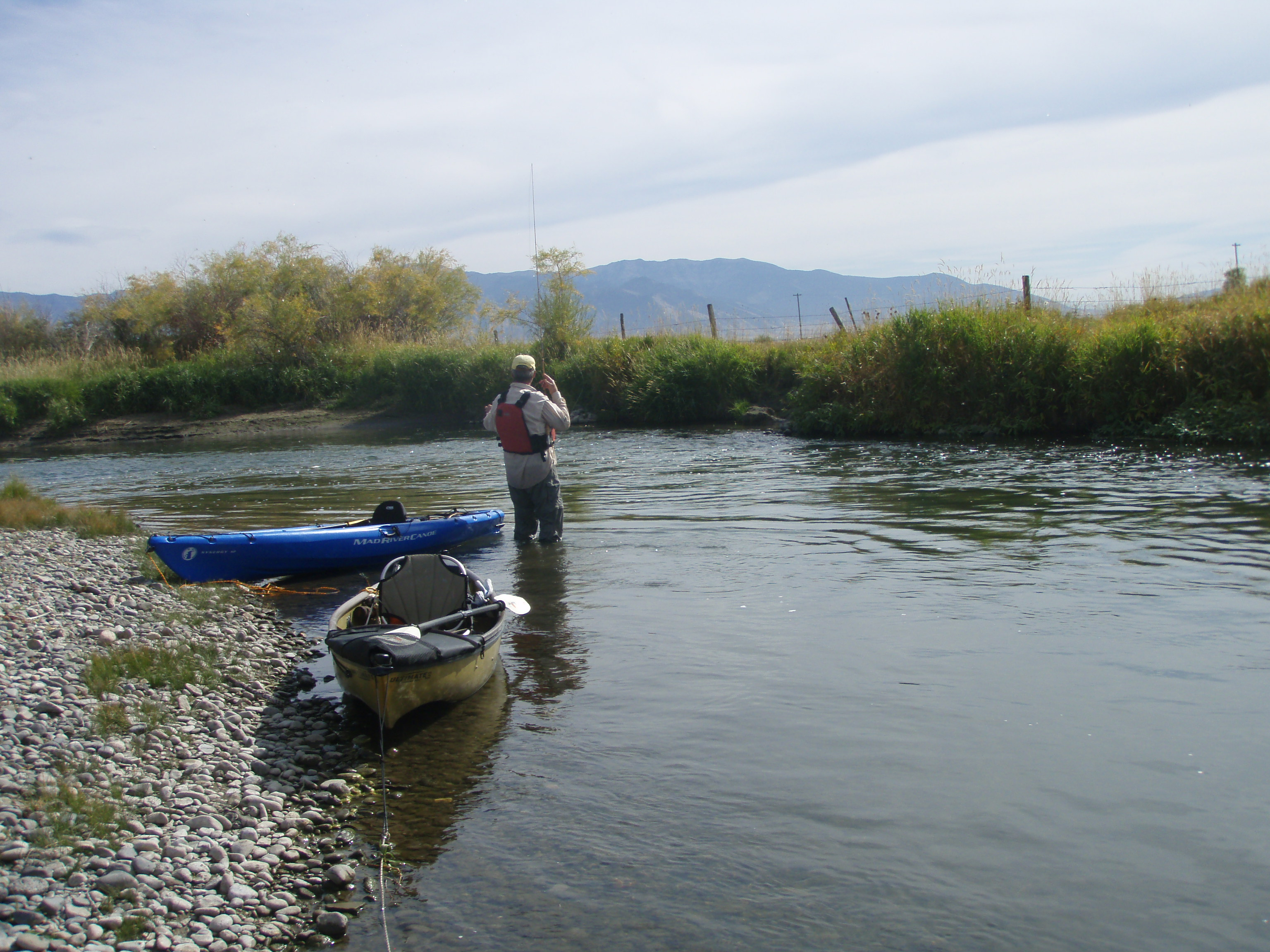
Kayak fishing on the East Gallatin

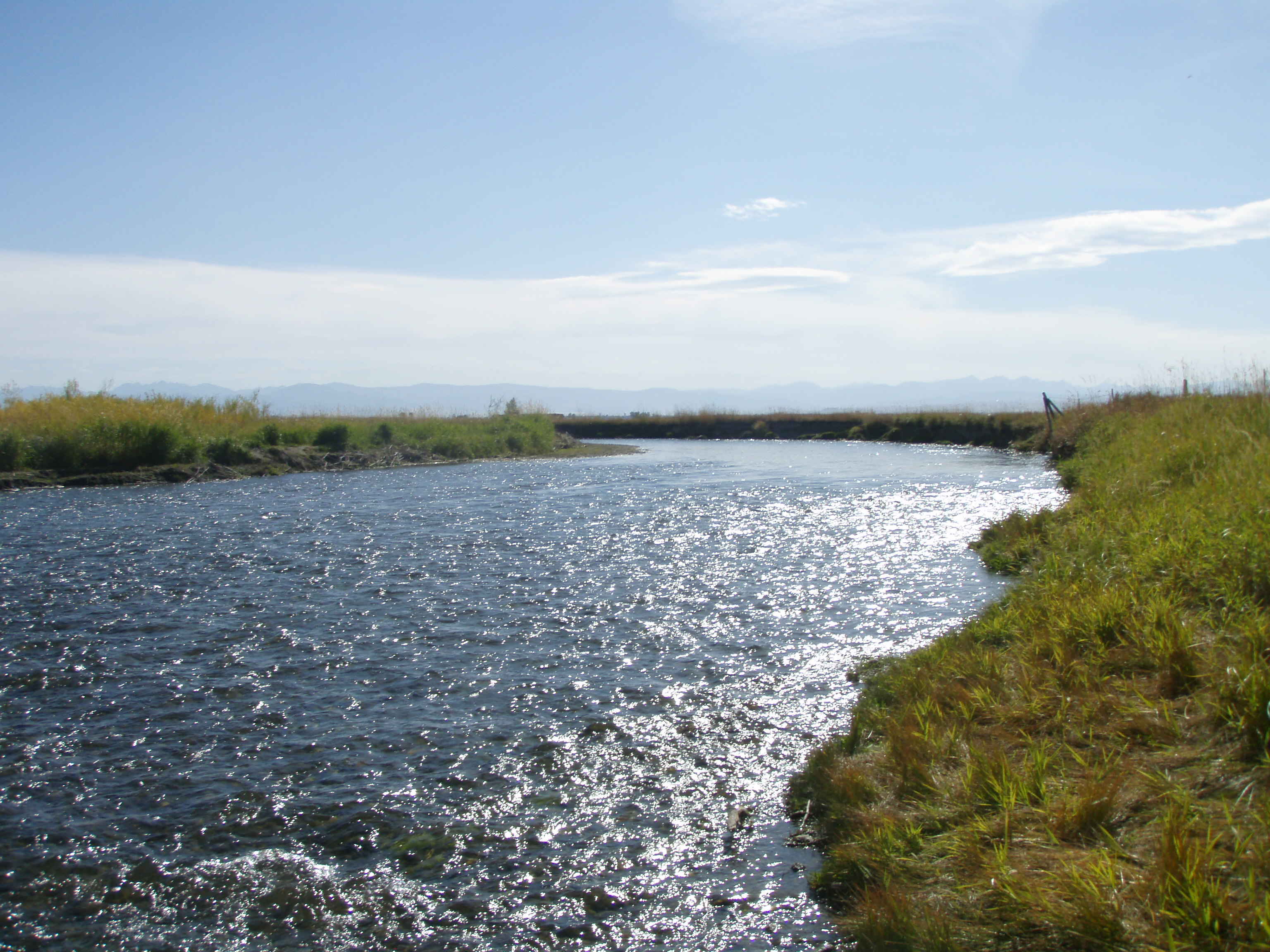
East Gallatin River near Swamp Road, September 2008

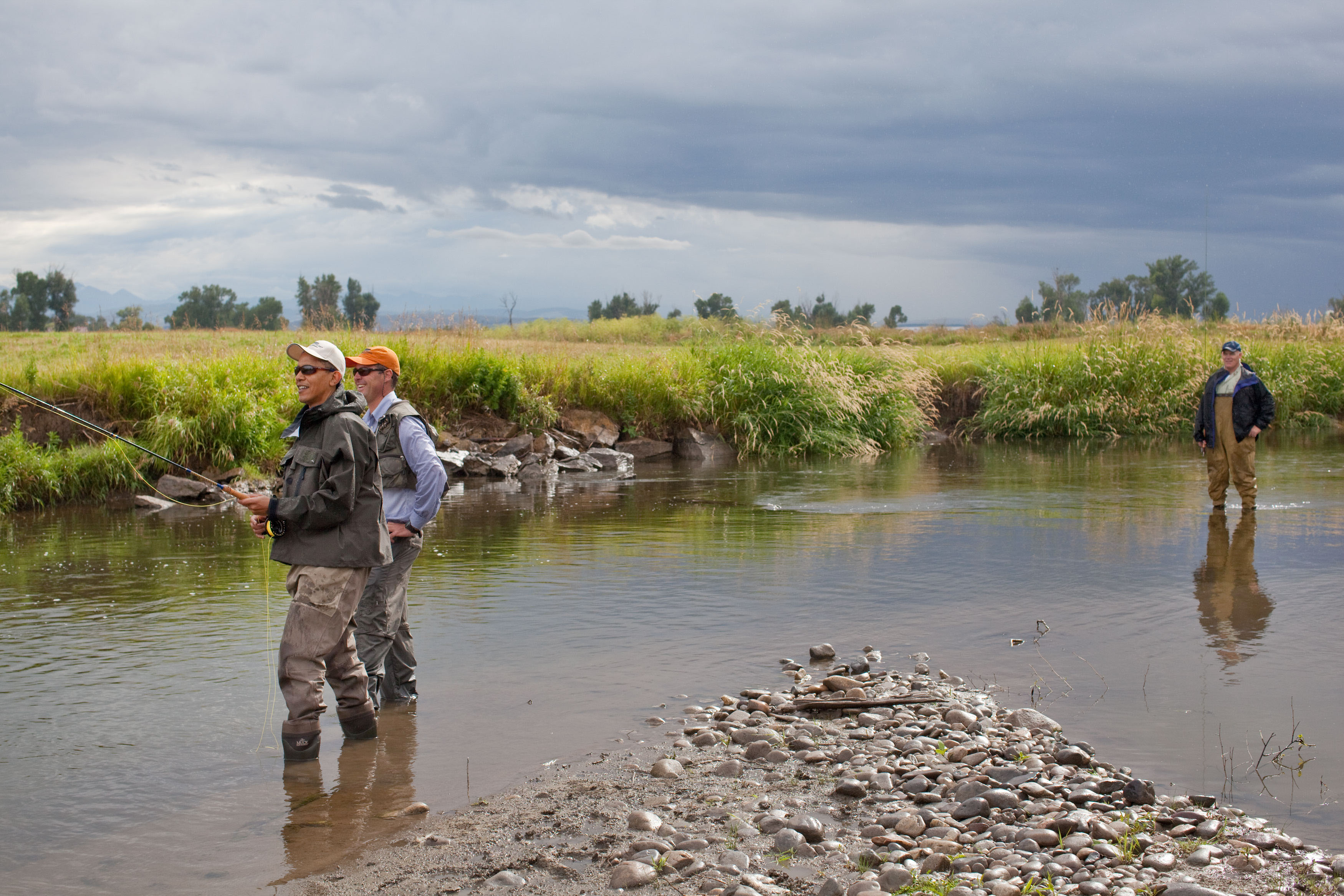
President Barack Obama and local fishing guide Dan Vermillion fish the East Gallatin River August 14, 2009

== See also ==
- List of rivers of Montana
- Montana Stream Access Law
- Fly fishing
