= Shields River =

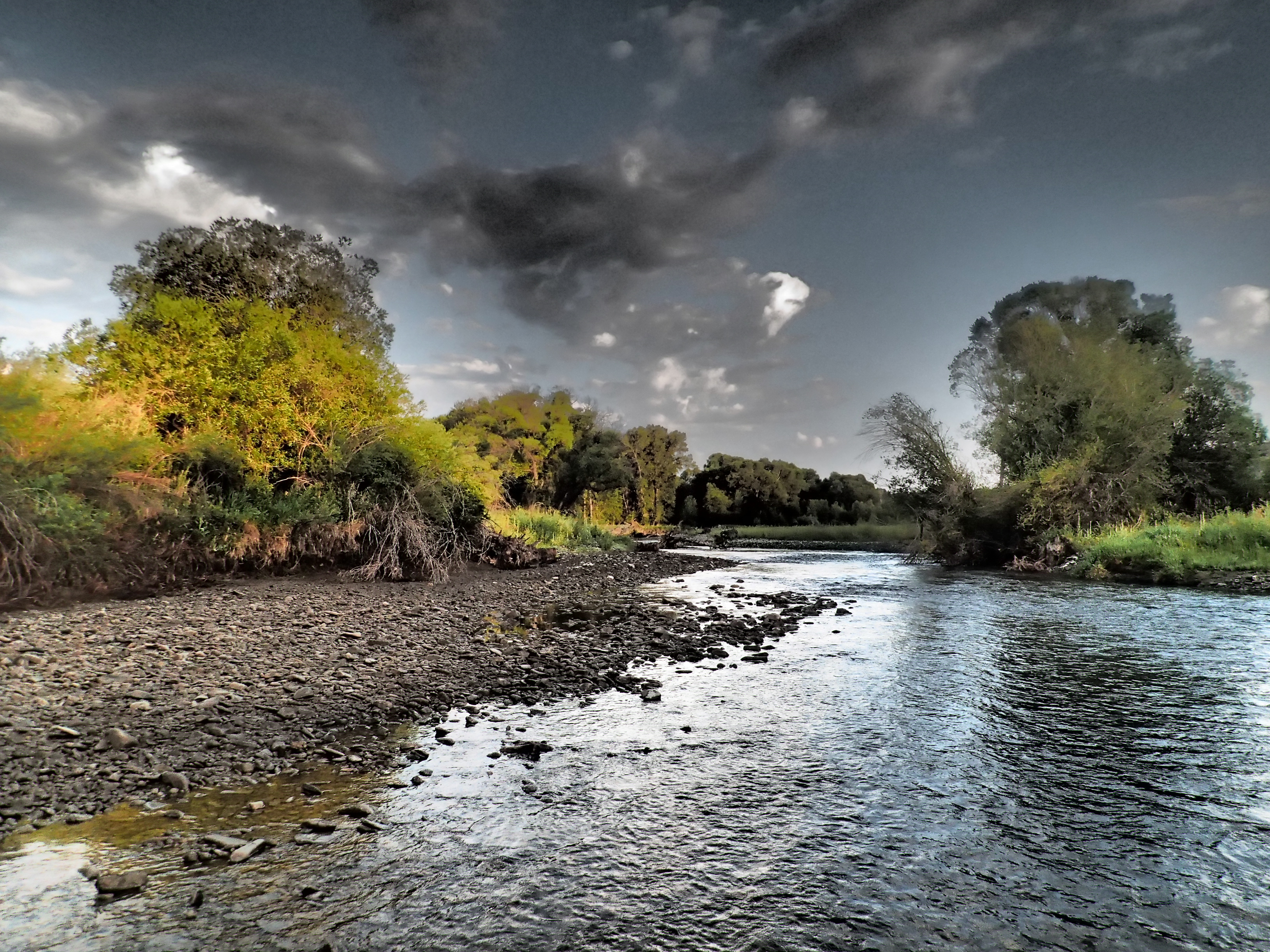
- Lower Shields River

Location
- Country: Park and Meagher County, Montana

Physical characteristics
- Source
  - coordinates: 46°11′19″N 110°18′40″W
- Mouth
  - coordinates: 45°43′25″N 110°27′27″W
  - elevation: 4,383 feet (1,336 m)
- Length: 65.4 mi (105.3 km)
- Discharge
  - location: near Livingston
  - average: 287 cu ft/s (8.1 m^{3}/s)

Basin features
- River system: Yellowstone River

The Shields River is a tributary of the Yellowstone River, 65.4 miles (105.3 km) long, in Meagher and Park Counties Montana in the United States.

It rises in the Gallatin National Forest in the Crazy Mountains in northern Park County. It flows west, then south, between the Bridger Range to the west and the Crazy Mountains to the east, past Wilsall and Clyde Park. It joins the Yellowstone approximately 10 mi (16 km) northeast of Livingston. The Shields River was named for John Shields (explorer), a member of the Lewis and Clark Expedition.

The river hosts native Yellowstone cutthroat trout and Mountain whitefish as well as introduced brown and rainbow trout.

== See also ==
- List of rivers of Montana
- Montana Stream Access Law
