= Sacagawea Peak (Bridger Range, Montana) =

Mountain in Montana

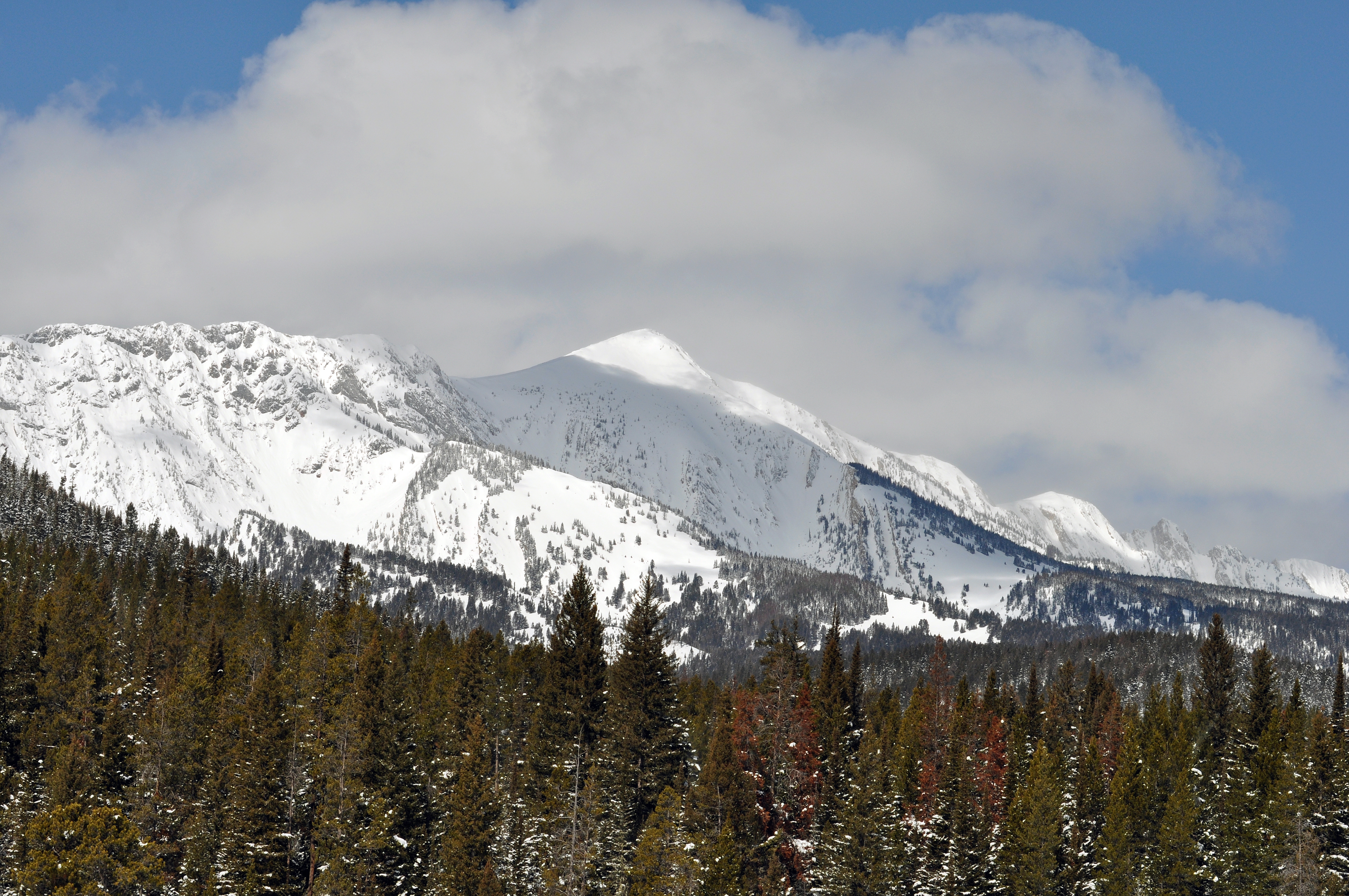
- Sacagawea Peak viewed from the south-east.

Highest point
- Elevation: 9,654 ft (2,943 m)
- Prominence: 3,930 ft (1,200 m)
- Coordinates: 45°53′45″N 110°58′7″W

Geography
- Location within Montana Location within the United States
- Location: Gallatin County, Montana, U.S.
- Parent range: Bridger Range
- Topo map: USGS Sacagawea Peak

Climbing
- Easiest route: Hike

Sacagawea Peak is the highest mountain in the Bridger Range in south-western Montana. The peak is named for Sacagawea, a Lemhi Shoshone woman that accompanied the Lewis and Clark Expedition.

== Recreation ==
The mountain is a popular hiking destination. The main trailhead starts at 7,788 feet and climbs 1,800 feet reaching the summit in 2 miles. The mountain holds snow in chutes through the early summer and local skiers often ski there through August.
