= U.S. Route 191 in Montana =

U.S. Highway in Montana

U.S. Highway 191
- US 191 highlighted in red

Route information
- Maintained by MDT
- Length: 442.161 mi (711.589 km)

Major junctions
- South end: Yellowstone National Park at West Yellowstone
- US 20 / US 287 in West Yellowstone; I-90 from Bozeman to Big Timber; US 89 in Livingston; US 12 in Harlowton; US 87 / MT 200 from Moore to Lewistown; US 2 in Malta
- North end: Highway 4 at the Canadian border at Morgan

Location
- Country: United States
- State: Montana
- Counties: Gallatin, Park, Sweet Grass, Wheatland, Fergus, Phillips

Highway system
- United States Numbered Highway System; List; Special; Divided; Montana Highway System; Interstate; US; State; Secondary
← MT 141	→ MT 200

U.S. Highway 191 (US 191) is a north-south United States Numbered Highway in the state of Montana. It extends approximately 442.2 miles (711.7 km) from Yellowstone National Park north to the Canadian border.

== Route description ==
US 191 in Montana begins at the West Entrance to Yellowstone National Park concurrent with US 20 and US 287, at the edge of the town of West Yellowstone. Some commercially produced maps show US 191 going through Yellowstone National Park; however, it officially has a gap inside the park and resumes in Wyoming at the South Entrance. A few blocks into West Yellowstone, US 20 leaves the US 191 / US 287 concurrency and heads west toward the Targhee Pass and Idaho. The highway heads north, running concurrently with US 287 for eight miles (13 km) before veering slightly east and passing through Yellowstone National Park for 20 miles (32 km), traversing forested, mountainous terrain and briefly following a 5.5-mile (8.9 km) diversion into the state of Wyoming, before leaving the park in the upper reaches of the Gallatin River canyon. The route travels northward through the narrow canyon, past the resort community of Big Sky, then entering the Gallatin Valley near the town of Gallatin Gateway. US 191 travels north and east through the valley to the city of Bozeman, which is the largest city along the entire US 191 route.

From Bozeman, US 191 is concurrent with I-90 eastward 60.5 miles (97.4 km) to Big Timber, where it proceeds north. The road travels through hilly ranch country near the eastern edge of the Crazy Mountains to Harlowton, where US 191 is briefly concurrent with US 12. North of Harlowton, US 191 is concurrent with MT 3 for 39 miles (63 km) to Eddie's Corner, where US 191 proceeds eastward to Lewistown on a roadway shared with US 87 and MT 200, in a wrong-way concurrency.

US 191 continues north after going through Lewistown, crossing the Missouri River at the Charles M. Russell National Wildlife Refuge, and through Malta, where it shares a brief concurrency with US 2. It ends at the Canada–United States border at Morgan, where the road continues into Saskatchewan as Highway 4 toward Swift Current.

== History ==
The routing of US 191 has drastically changed through the years, with original route designated in 1926 ran from Idaho Falls, Idaho, to West Yellowstone concurrent with US 20, which existed until 1981 when US 191 rerouted to its current alignment through Wyoming, Utah, and Arizona.

On February 1, 1935, US 191 was extended over Montana Highway 187 (also known as the Gallatin Way) to Bozeman.

In 1996, US 191 was extended from Malta the Canadian border, absorbing former Montana Secondary Highway 242.

== Major intersections ==
County	Location	mi	km	Exit	Destinations	Notes
Gallatin	Yellowstone National Park	0.000	0.000		West Entrance Road (to US 20 east / US 191 south / US 287 south)	Continuation into Yellowstone National Park; US 191 / US 287 resume in Wyoming at the park's south entrance; US 20 resumes in Wyoming at the park's east entrance
Gallatin	Yellowstone National Park	0.000	0.000	Yellowstone National Park boundary (West Entrance); fees required; closed winters		
Gallatin	Yellowstone National Park	0.000	0.000		US 20 begins / US 287 begins	US 191 / US 287 southern terminus; US 20 eastern terminus; southern end of US 20 / US 287 concurrency
Gallatin	West Yellowstone	0.365	0.587		US 20 west (Firehold Avenue) – Idaho Falls	Northern end of US 20 concurrency
Gallatin		8.722	14.037		US 287 north – Hebgen Lake, Ennis, Virginia City	Northern end of US 287 concurrency
Gallatin	Yellowstone National Park	11.147	17.939	Yellowstone National Park boundary		
Gallatin	Yellowstone National Park	15.266	24.568		US 191 north	Continuation into Wyoming
US 191 exits and reenters Montana via Wyoming
Gallatin	Yellowstone National Park	20.722	33.349		US 191 south	Continuation into Wyoming
Gallatin	Yellowstone National Park	31.477	50.657	Yellowstone National Park boundary		
Gallatin	Big Sky Canyon	48.191	77.556		MT 64 west (Lone Mountain Trail) – Big Sky	
Gallatin	Four Corners	82.148	132.204		MT 84 west / MT 85 north – Norris, Belgrade	
Gallatin	Bozeman	89.115	143.417		I-90 BL west (7th Avenue)	Southern end of I-90 BL concurrency
Gallatin	Bozeman	89.803	144.524		MT 86 north (Rouse Avenue) – Bridger Bowl	
Gallatin	Bozeman	90.930	146.338	309	I-90 west – Butte	Northern end of I-90 BL concurrency; eastern terminus of I-90 BL; southern end of I-90 concurrency; exit numbers follow I-90
Gallatin		97.053	156.192	313	Bear Canyon Road	
Gallatin		100.374	161.536	316	Trail Creek Road	
Gallatin		103.274	166.203	319	Jackson Creek Road	
Gallatin		108.233	174.184	324	Ranch Access	
Park	Livingston	114.696	184.585	330	I-90 BL east – Livingston	
Park	Livingston	116.650	187.730	333	US 89 south – Yellowstone National Park, Livingston City Center	Southern end of US 89 concurrency
Park	Livingston	121.598	195.693	337	I-90 BL west – Livingston	
Park		124.128	199.765	340	US 89 north – White Sulphur Springs	Northern end of US 89 concurrency
Park		126.990	204.371	343	Mission Creek Road	
Park		134.154	215.900	350	Eastern end Access	
Park		136.408	219.527	352	Ranch Access	
Sweet Grass		138.015	222.114	354	S-563 – Springdale	
Sweet Grass		145.798	234.639	362	De Hart	
Sweet Grass	Big Timber	151.387	243.634	367	I-90 east – Billings	Northern end of I-90 concurrency; western terminus of I-90 BL; southern end of I-90 BL concurrency
Sweet Grass	Big Timber	152.542	245.493		S-298 south (McLeod Street)	
Sweet Grass	Big Timber	152.771	245.861		I-90 BL east – Billings	Northern end of I-90 BL concurrency
Sweet Grass		154.168	248.109		S-478 east	
Wheatland	Harlowton	196.655	316.486		US 12 west – White Sulphur Springs	Southern end of US 12 concurrency
Wheatland	Harlowton	198.041	318.716		US 12 east / MT 3 south / Nez Perce Trail – Billings	Northern end of US 12 concurrency; southern end of MT 3 concurrency
Wheatland	Judith Gap	215.843	347.366		S-279 south	
Fergus	Eddies Corner	237.274	381.855		US 87 north / MT 3 north / MT 200 west / Lewis and Clark Trail – Great Falls	Northern end of MT 3; southern end of US 87/MT 200 concurrency
Fergus	Lewistown	251.609	404.925		US 87 south / MT 200 east / Lewis and Clark Trail – Lewistown	Northern end of US 87/MT 200 concurrency; western terminus of unsigned US 87 Byp.; southern end of US 87 Byp. concurrency
Fergus	Lewistown	253.793	408.440		S-227 north (Joyland Road)	
Fergus	Lewistown	254.548	409.655		Truck Bypass (US 87 Byp. south) to US 87 / MT 200 – Billings	Northern end of US 87 Byp. unsigned concurrency
Fergus		257.017	413.629		S-426 (Hanover Road)	
Fergus	Brooks	263.726	424.426		MT 81 west – Denton	
Fergus	Hilger	269.068	433.023		S-236 north – Winifred	
Fergus		297.065	478.080		MT 19 south – Grass Range	
Phillips		332.852	535.673		MT 66 north / Nez Perce Trail – Harlem	
Phillips	Malta	387.973	624.382		US 2 east (North 1st Street East) / Lewis and Clark Trail – Glasgow	Southern end of US 2 concurrency
Phillips	Malta	388.177	624.710		US 2 west / Lewis and Clark Trail – Havre	Northern end of US 2 concurrency
Phillips		411.591	662.392		S-208 north – Whitewater	
Phillips	Morgan	442.161	711.589	Canadian border at the Morgan Border Crossing		
Phillips	Morgan	442.161	711.589		Highway 4 north – Swift Current	Continuation into Saskatchewan
1.000 mi = 1.609 km; 1.000 km = 0.621 mi: Closed/former; Concurrency terminus; Route transition

== See also ==
U.S. Route 191
Previous state: Wyoming	Montana	Next state: Terminus
