= Four Corners, Montana =

- Census-designated place
- Location of Four Corners, Montana
- Coordinates: 45°39′14″N 111°11′17″W
- Country: United States
- State: Montana
- County: Gallatin

Area
  - Total: 10.91 sq mi (28.25 km^{2})
  - Land: 10.84 sq mi (28.08 km^{2})
  - Water: 0.066 sq mi (0.17 km^{2})
- Elevation: 4,718 ft (1,438 m)

Population (2020)
  - Total: 5,901
  - Density: 544.2/sq mi (210.12/km^{2})
- Time zone: UTC-7 (Mountain (MST))
  - Summer (DST): UTC-6 (MDT)
- Area code: 406
- FIPS code: 30-28862
- GNIS feature ID: 2408250

Four Corners is a census-designated place (CDP) in Gallatin County, Montana, United States. The population was 5,901 at the 2020 census, up from 3,146 in 2010. It is part of the Bozeman, MT Micropolitan Statistical Area.

== Geography ==
Four Corners is located in central Gallatin County 7 miles (11 km) west of Bozeman. The "Four Corners" refers to the intersection of U.S. Route 191, Montana Highway 84 and Montana Highway 85. US 191 leads east to Bozeman and south 82 miles (132 km) to West Yellowstone, MT 84 leads west 29 miles (47 km) to Norris, and MT 85 leads north 9 miles (14 km) to Belgrade and Interstate 90.

According to the United States Census Bureau, the Four Corners CDP has a total area of 10.84 square miles (28.07 km^{2}). The Gallatin River, a north-flowing tributary of the Missouri River, forms the western edge of the CDP.

== Demographics ==
Historical population
Census	Pop.	Note	%±
2020	5,901		—
U.S. Decennial Census

=== 2020 census ===
As of the 2020 census, Four Corners had a population of 5,901. The median age was 36.7 years. 27.6% of residents were under the age of 18 and 12.6% of residents were 65 years of age or older. For every 100 females there were 105.0 males, and for every 100 females age 18 and over there were 106.0 males age 18 and over.

0.0% of residents lived in urban areas, while 100.0% lived in rural areas.

There were 2,196 households in Four Corners, of which 37.8% had children under the age of 18 living in them. Of all households, 60.3% were married-couple households, 18.1% were households with a male householder and no spouse or partner present, and 13.6% were households with a female householder and no spouse or partner present. About 18.6% of all households were made up of individuals and 6.7% had someone living alone who was 65 years of age or older.

There were 2,333 housing units, of which 5.9% were vacant. The homeowner vacancy rate was 0.5% and the rental vacancy rate was 2.0%.

Racial composition as of the 2020 census
Race	Number	Percent
White	5,364	90.9%
Black or African American	15	0.3%
American Indian and Alaska Native	29	0.5%
Asian	46	0.8%
Native Hawaiian and Other Pacific Islander	4	0.1%
Some other race	119	2.0%
Two or more races	324	5.5%
Hispanic or Latino (of any race)	252	4.3%

=== 2000 census ===
As of the census of 2000, there were 1,828 people, 761 households, and 506 families residing in the CDP. The population density was 178.4 inhabitants per square mile (68.9/km^{2}). There were 795 housing units at an average density of 77.6 per square mile (30.0/km^{2}). The racial makeup of the CDP was 97.43% White, 0.16% African American, 0.55% Native American, 0.49% Asian, 0.16% Pacific Islander, 0.27% from other races, and 0.93% from two or more races. Hispanic or Latino of any race were 0.98% of the population.

There were 761 households, out of which 30.1% had children under the age of 18 living with them, 55.6% were married couples living together, 7.0% had a female householder with no husband present, and 33.5% were non-families. 24.7% of all households were made up of individuals, and 5.8% had someone living alone who was 65 years of age or older. The average household size was 2.40 and the average family size was 2.87.

In the CDP, the population was spread out, with 23.0% under the age of 18, 10.1% from 18 to 24, 31.3% from 25 to 44, 25.7% from 45 to 64, and 9.9% who were 65 years of age or older. The median age was 37 years. For every 100 females, there were 112.1 males. For every 100 females age 18 and over, there were 113.2 males.

The median income for a household in the CDP was $36,964, and the median income for a family was $43,977. Males had a median income of $30,710 versus $21,146 for females. The per capita income for the CDP was $18,185. About 8.1% of families and 10.3% of the population were below the poverty threshold, including 12.7% of those under age 18 and 12.3% of those age 65 or over.

== Media ==
The FM radio station KSCY is licensed in Four Corners. It broadcasts a country music format.

== Education ==
Most of it is in Monforton Elementary School District, while portions are in the Gallatin Gateway Elementary School District and the Bozeman Elementary School District. All of it is in Bozeman High School District. The Bozeman elementary and high school districts are both a part of Bozeman Public Schools.

== See also ==
- List of census-designated places in Montana
