= Montana Highway 84 =

State highway in Montana, United States

Montana Highway 84
- MT 84 highlighted in red

Route information
- Maintained by MDT
- Length: 28.904 mi (46.516 km)

Major junctions
- West end: US 287 in Norris
- East end: US 191 / MT 85 near Four Corners

Location
- Country: United States
- State: Montana
- Counties: Gallatin, Madison

Highway system
- Montana Highway System; Interstate; US; State; Secondary
← MT 83	→ MT 85

Highway 84 (MT 84) is a 28.904-mile-long (46.516 km) east–west state highway in the U.S. State of Montana. MT 84's western terminus is at U.S. Route 287 (US 287) in the small community of Norris and the eastern terminus is at US 191 and MT 85 at Four Corners. The highway's eastern terminus, about 7 miles (11 km) west of Bozeman, is a location known locally as "Four Corners." From Four Corners, US 191 runs east to Bozeman, and south to West Yellowstone; Highway 84 travels west to Norris; and Montana Highway 85 runs north to Belgrade.

Before receiving its current designation, Highway 84 was designated as Montana Secondary Highway 289.

== Major intersections ==
County	Location	mi	km	Destinations	Notes
Madison	Norris	0.000	0.000	US 287 – Harrison, Ennis	
Gallatin		25.081	40.364	S-288 north – Churchill, Amsterdam	
Gallatin	Four Corners	28.904	46.516	US 191 / MT 85 north – Belgrade, Bozeman, West Yellowstone	
1.000 mi = 1.609 km; 1.000 km = 0.621 mi
