= Churchill, Montana =

- CDP
- Location of Amsterdam-Churchill, Montana
- Coordinates: 45°45′18″N 111°18′27″W
- Country: United States
- State: Montana
- County: Gallatin

Area
  - Total: 3.55 sq mi (9.20 km^{2})
  - Land: 3.55 sq mi (9.20 km^{2})
  - Water: 0 sq mi (0.00 km^{2})
- Elevation: 4,584 ft (1,397 m)

Population (2020)
  - Total: 1,030
  - Density: 289.9/sq mi (111.95/km^{2})
- Time zone: UTC-7 (Mountain (MST))
  - Summer (DST): UTC-6 (MDT)
- Area code: 406
- FIPS code: 30-01550
- GNIS ID: 2629943

Churchill is a census-designated place (CDP) in Gallatin County, Montana, United States. The population was 1,030 at the 2020 census. It is part of the Bozeman, MT Micropolitan Statistical Area. It was formerly part of the Amsterdam-Churchill CDP.

== Geography ==
According to the United States Census Bureau, the CDP has a total area of 3.6 square miles (9.3 km^{2}), all land.

The area near town is agricultural, so fields and small creeks are plentiful. The town is bordered by the Camp Creek on the west, Godfrey Creek to the south and east, and Valley Ditch to the east and north. Located in the Gallatin valley, Churchill has views of the Horseshoe Hills to the north, the Bridger Mountains to the northeast, and the Gallatin Mountains to the southeast, the Spanish Peaks- the Madison Range to the south, and the Tobacco Root Mountains to the west.

== History ==
Church Hill, or Churchill as it was later shortened by the Gallatin County Road Department, is at the center of Montana's largest Dutch settlement. The area runs from Manhattan to Little Holland 14 miles (23 km) to the south.

While Amsterdam may have been the retail center of the Dutch settlement, Churchill was the cultural center. The town was the site of the Dutch community's original church- the 1st Christian Reformed Church, today known as Manhattan Christian Reformed Church. Related to the church is the parent-operated private school, Manhattan Christian School. Both exist today along with Bethel Christian Reformed Church (a spin off of the original church) and Churchill Retirement Home. The large church on the hill is the probable origin of the name, and once was the largest wooden structure west of the Mississippi River.

In the late 1890s, Dutch immigrants came to the Gallatin Valley, with the aid of the Manhattan Malting Company, and created a "linear settlement" of homes, farms, and ranches that stretched roughly 14 miles south of Manhattan, with Amsterdam and Churchill roughly in the middle. Recognizing the growth of the community, the Northern Pacific designated a siding called Amsterdam to the west of "the hill" along its Anceney Spur. Not to be outdone, the C.M. & St. Paul Railway (aka:the Milwaukee Road) created a siding for agricultural goods about two miles to the east of Churchill along its Gallatin Valley Railway called the "Holland Siding", subsequently the "east of the hill" became known on maps as Holland. Seven miles to the south of Churchill, near an area where many Dutch settlers homesteaded, is an area called "Little Holland" and today is marked by one of the two cemeteries established by the original Dutch settlers, while the other cemetery is located in Churchill.

== Demographics ==
Historical population
Census	Pop.	Note	%±
2020	1,030		—
U.S. Decennial Census

== Education ==
It is in Amsterdam Elementary School District and the Manhattan High School District. The high school district is a part of Manhattan Public Schools.

Elementary students in public schools attend either Amsterdam School or Manhattan Elementary School. High school students attend Manhattan High School. In 2022, the high school had 260 students with 18.8 full-time equivalency teachers.

Manhattan Christian School is a private school in Churchill. It is a Class C school, a designation used in Montana for sports competitions.

== Media ==
Churchill is located in the Bozeman media market.

The FM radio station KXLB is licensed in Churchill. KXLB airs a country music format to the greater Bozeman area.

Local news is published in the Bozeman Daily Chronicle.

== Infrastructure ==
Churchill is located 8 miles (13 km) south of Interstate 90 and 6 miles (10 km) west of Montana Highway 85.

The nearest airport is Bozeman Yellowstone International Airport.
