= Montana Highway 85 =

State highway in Montana, United States

Montana Highway 85
- MT 85 highlighted in red

Route information
- Maintained by MDT
- Length: 6.704 mi (10.789 km)

Major junctions
- South end: US 191 / MT 84 west of Bozeman
- North end: I-90 at Belgrade

Location
- Country: United States
- State: Montana
- Counties: Gallatin

Highway system
- Montana Highway System; Interstate; US; State; Secondary
← MT 84	→ MT 86

Highway 85 (MT 85) is a 6.704-mile-long (10.789 km) north–south state highway traversing the central Gallatin Valley in the U.S. State of Montana. The highway's southern terminus, just north of Bozeman Hot Springs and about 7 miles (11 km) west of Bozeman, is a census-designated place (CDP) known as "Four Corners." From Four Corners, U.S. Route 191 (US 191) runs east to Bozeman, and south to West Yellowstone; MT 84 travels west to Norris; and MT 85 runs north to Belgrade. The designated MT 85 terminates near the southern end of Belgrade, at an interchange with Interstate 90 (I-90).

== Route description ==
Highway 85 begins at an intersection with US 191 and Highway 84 in the census-designated place of Four Corners. US 191 enters the intersection from the south and turns east, Highway 84 heads west, and Highway 85 starts heading north. The highway is entirely straight from beginning to end. The southern three quarters of the route are along a two-lane highway. Once it reaches Belgrade, it expands to a four-lane road with a center turning lane. The route ends at a partial cloverleaf interchange with I-90 in Belgrade. The road continues north as Jackrabbit Lane, its street name in Belgrade.

== History ==
Before receiving its current designation, Highway 85 was designated as Montana Secondary Highway 291.

== Major intersections ==
The entire route is in Gallatin County.

Location	mi	km	Destinations	Notes
Four Corners	0.000	0.000	US 191 / MT 84 west – West Yellowstone, Bozeman, Norris	
	4.016	6.463	S-235 east (Valley Center Road)	
Belgrade	6.544	10.532	S-347 west (Amsterdam Road) – Amsterdam	
Belgrade	6.704	10.789	I-90 / S-291 north – Butte, Billings, Airport	I-90 exit 298
1.000 mi = 1.609 km; 1.000 km = 0.621 mi
