= Montana Highway 66 =

Highway in Montana

Montana Highway 66
- MT 66 highlighted in red

Route information
- Maintained by MDT
- Length: 50.022 mi (80.503 km)

Major junctions
- South end: US 191 south of Landusky
- North end: US 2 at Fort Belknap

Location
- Country: United States
- State: Montana
- Counties: Phillips, Blaine

Highway system
- Montana Highway System; Interstate; US; State; Secondary
← MT 64	→ MT 67

Montana Highway 66 (MT 66) is a 50-mile-long (80 km) state highway in the US state of Montana. It begins at an intersection with U.S. Highway 191 (US 191) in far southwestern Phillips County and runs northerly to the town of Fort Belknap in Blaine County. Approximately 40 miles (64 km) of the northern end of the route is within the boundaries of the Fort Belknap Indian Reservation, running through the bulk of its territory.

== Route description ==
MT 66 starts at an intersection with US 191 approximately 55 miles (89 km) southwest of Malta. It proceeds in a generally northwesterly direction, skirting the western edge of the Little Rocky Mountains. The road turns north just before crossing the county line from Phillips County into Blaine County, and subsequently enters the Fort Belknap Indian Reservation where it remains for the rest of its journey. After passing the small community of Hays on its western edge, the road continues north on a mostly straight route before turning northwest and enters Fort Belknap from the south, before a final turn to the northeast joins MT 66 to US 2 at a rest area.

== History ==
Before receiving its current designation in 1978, MT 66 was designated as Montana Secondary Highway 376 (S-376).

== Major intersections ==
County	Location	mi	km	Destinations	Notes
Phillips		0.00	0.00	US 191	Southern terminus
Blaine	Fort Belknap Agency	50.022	80.503	US 2	Northern terminus
1.000 mi = 1.609 km; 1.000 km = 0.621 mi
