= KSCY =

Coordinates: 45.639°N 111.266°W

- Four Corners, Montana; United States
- Broadcast area: Bozeman, Montana
- Frequency: 106.9 MHz
- Branding: "K-Sky Country 106.9"

Programming
- Format: Country

Ownership
- Owner: Silver Star Communications, Inc.; (Silver Star Communications, Inc.)
- Sister stations: KBZM, KKQX

History
- First air date: April 2008
- Call sign meaning: "K - SKY"

Technical information
- Licensing authority: FCC
- Facility ID: 164231
- Class: C2
- ERP: 4,000 watts
- HAAT: 197 meters (646 feet)
- Translator: (105.1 MHz) K286CY (Gallatin Gateway)

Links
- Public license information: Public file; LMS
- Website: kskycountry.com

KSCY (106.9 FM) is a radio station broadcasting in the Bozeman, Montana area. It is licensed to serve Four Corners, Montana. The owner is Silver Star Communications, Inc. The station is more commonly known as K-SKY Country, featuring today's hottest country hits and biggest country stars and 20 in-a-row.

KSCY broadcasts a new country music format. Studios, along with KBZM and KKQX, are at 8274 Huffine Lane, west of Bozeman, near Four Corners. Its transmitter site is off Highway 84, southwest of Four Corners. It has been granted a U.S. Federal Communications Commission construction permit to increase ERP to 12,000 watts.
