= Hillman, Montana =

Unincorporated community in Montana, U.S.

Coordinates: 45°53′21″N 111°11′51″W

Hillman is an unincorporated community in Gallatin County, in the U.S. state of Montana.

== History ==
The community was named in honor of A. J. Hilman, a railroad agent who had formerly lived in the area.
