= Lost Dakota =

Exclave of the former Dakota Territory

Coordinates: 44.4740671°N 111.05°W

Lost Dakota was a small, uninhabited portion of land that was left over after the division and organization of the large former Dakota Territory into new territories in the late 19th century.

== History ==
The original Dakota Territory was organized in 1861, and comprised the present-day states of North Dakota and South Dakota, in addition to large parts of Montana and Wyoming, and small parts of other current states. The territory underwent several re-organizations and partitions over the years of its existence, particularly in 1863 with the creation of the Idaho Territory and 1864 with the creation of the Montana Territory. In the process, due to inaccuracies in surveys and definitions, a small portion of territory in present-day southern Montana, between the Continental Divide and the 44°30’ N circle of latitude, was not assigned to any other territory, meaning it was still technically an exclave of the Dakota Territory despite the remainder of the land being more than 360 miles (580 km) to the east. It was not until February 1873 that the land was officially assigned to the Montana Territory.

== Geography ==
Lost Dakota was approximately 11 square miles (28 km^{2}) in size, roughly a third the size of Manhattan. The former exclave is located in the southern tip of Gallatin County, Montana, near the tripoint between the current states of Idaho, Wyoming, and Montana. Its boundaries run along the Continental Divide, parallel 44°30' North, and the 34th meridian west from Washington.

== See also ==
- Yellowstone National Park
- West Yellowstone
- Northwest United States
- Rural Areas in the United States
- List of autonomous territories
- List of Uninhabited Regions
- Wilderness
- Zone of Death (Yellowstone), an adjacent area of Yellowstone National Park whose legal jurisdiction came into question during the 21st century
- Tristate Region
- 51st State
