= Manhattan, Montana =

- Town
- Seal
- Motto: Heart of the Gallatin Valley
- Location of Manhattan, Montana
- Coordinates: 45°51′57″N 111°20′06″W
- Country: United States
- State: Montana
- County: Gallatin

Area
  - Total: 1.74 sq mi (4.50 km^{2})
  - Land: 1.74 sq mi (4.50 km^{2})
  - Water: 0 sq mi (0.00 km^{2})
- Elevation: 4,252 ft (1,296 m)

Population (2020)
  - Total: 2,086
  - Density: 1,199.7/sq mi (463.22/km^{2})
- Time zone: UTC-7 (Mountain (MST))
  - Summer (DST): UTC-6 (MDT)
- ZIP code: 59741
- Area code: 406
- FIPS code: 30-47575
- GNIS feature ID: 2412941
- Website: www.townofmanhattan.com

Manhattan is a town in Gallatin County, Montana, United States. The population was 2,086 at the 2020 census. It is part of the Bozeman Micropolitan Statistical Area.

== History ==
In 1865, the town was called Hamilton. This changed in 1883 when they named it Moreland after the Moreland Irrigation Canal. Eventually it was changed to Manhattan after a malting company in the rise of the barley empire.

== Geography ==
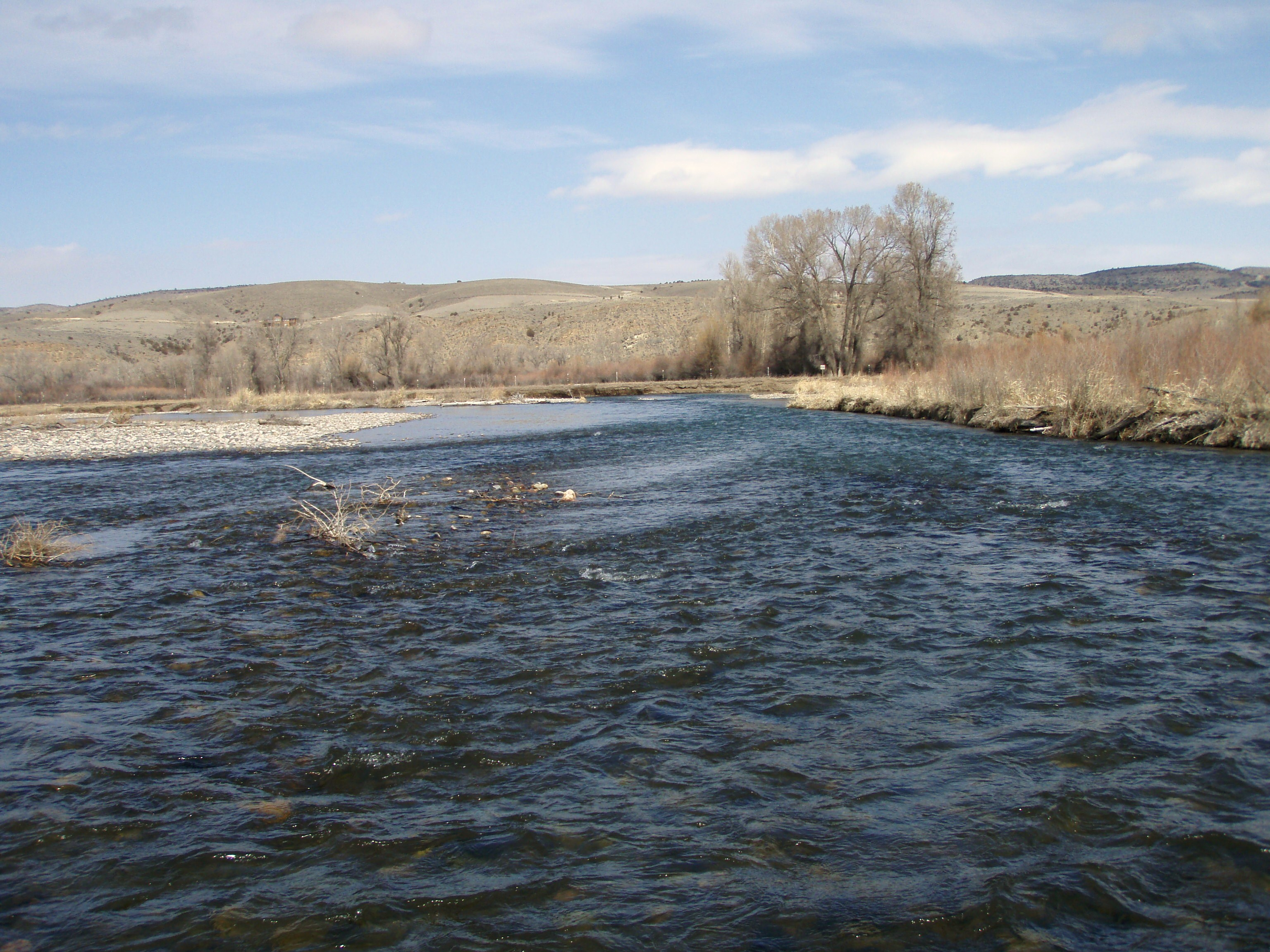
Lower Gallatin River near Manhattan

According to the United States Census Bureau, the town has a total area of 1.93 square miles (5.00 km^{2}), all land.

The Gallatin River is east and north of town. The Bridger Mountains are to the north and the Gallatin Mountains are to the south.

=== Climate ===
This climatic region is typified by large seasonal temperature differences, with warm to hot (and often humid) summers and cold (sometimes severely cold) winters. According to the Köppen Climate Classification system, Manhattan has a humid continental climate, abbreviated "Dfb" on climate maps.

== Demographics ==
Historical population
Census	Pop.	Note	%±
1920	591		—
1930	501		−15.2%
1940	646		28.9%
1950	716		10.8%
1960	889		24.2%
1970	816		−8.2%
1980	988		21.1%
1990	1,034		4.7%
2000	1,396		35.0%
2010	1,520		8.9%
2020	2,086		37.2%
U.S. Decennial Census

=== 2020 census ===
As of the 2020 census, Manhattan had a population of 2,086. The median age was 37.7 years. 27.9% of residents were under the age of 18 and 15.9% of residents were 65 years of age or older. For every 100 females there were 102.3 males, and for every 100 females age 18 and over there were 104.3 males age 18 and over.

0.0% of residents lived in urban areas, while 100.0% lived in rural areas.

There were 803 households in Manhattan, of which 36.0% had children under the age of 18 living in them. Of all households, 54.7% were married-couple households, 19.3% were households with a male householder and no spouse or partner present, and 21.7% were households with a female householder and no spouse or partner present. About 26.5% of all households were made up of individuals and 13.2% had someone living alone who was 65 years of age or older.

There were 872 housing units, of which 7.9% were vacant. The homeowner vacancy rate was 1.9% and the rental vacancy rate was 11.7%.

Racial composition as of the 2020 census
Race	Number	Percent
White	1,838	88.1%
Black or African American	2	0.1%
American Indian and Alaska Native	4	0.2%
Asian	9	0.4%
Native Hawaiian and Other Pacific Islander	5	0.2%
Some other race	12	0.6%
Two or more races	216	10.4%
Hispanic or Latino (of any race)	66	3.2%

=== 2010 census ===
As of the census of 2010, there were 1,520 people, 622 households, and 405 families living in the town. The population density was 787.6 inhabitants per square mile (304.1/km^{2}). There were 733 housing units at an average density of 379.8 per square mile (146.6/km^{2}). The racial makeup of the town was 96.2% White, 0.1% African American, 0.3% Native American, 0.7% Asian, 0.1% Pacific Islander, 0.3% from other races, and 2.3% from two or more races. Hispanic or Latino of any race were 2.6% of the population.

There were 622 households, of which 31.2% had children under the age of 18 living with them, 54.3% were married couples living together, 6.6% had a female householder with no husband present, 4.2% had a male householder with no wife present, and 34.9% were non-families. 29.6% of all households were made up of individuals, and 12.8% had someone living alone who was 65 years of age or older. The average household size was 2.40 and the average family size was 3.02.

The median age in the town was 41.2 years. 25.8% of residents were under the age of 18; 4.7% were between the ages of 18 and 24; 24.9% were from 25 to 44; 29.5% were from 45 to 64; and 15.2% were 65 years of age or older. The gender makeup of the town was 51.1% male and 48.9% female.

=== 2000 census ===
As of the census of 2000, there were 1,396 people, 553 households, and 389 families living in the town. The population density was 2,303.9 inhabitants per square mile (889.5/km^{2}). There were 582 housing units at an average density of 960.5 per square mile (370.9/km^{2}). The racial makeup of the town was 97.42% White, 0.72% Native American, 0.29% Asian, 0.07% Pacific Islander, 0.43% from other races, and 1.07% from two or more races. Hispanic or Latino of any race were 0.93% of the population. In the 1800s a colony of Dutch farmers settled here and grew large amounts of barley, which was used by Bozeman, Montana brewers.

There were 553 households, out of which 33.6% had children under the age of 18 living with them, 61.3% were married couples living together, 4.7% had a female householder with no husband present, and 29.5% were non-families. 24.6% of all households were made up of individuals, and 10.1% had someone living alone who was 65 years of age or older. The average household size was 2.52 and the average family size was 3.03.

In the town, the population distribution was as follows: 26.6% were under the age of 18, 7.7% were between 18 and 24, 29.7% were aged 25 to 44, 22.8% were aged 45 to 64, and 13.1% were 65 years old or older. The median age in the town was 38 years. There were 105.9 males for every 100 females, and for every 100 females aged 18 and over, there were 98.8 males.

The median income for a household in the town was $38,242, and the median income for a family was $45,521. Males had a median income of $31,319 versus $19,875 for females. The per capita income for the town was $17,024. About 5.2% of families and 7.1% of the population were below the poverty line, including 7.5% of those under age 18 and 12.4% of those age 65 or over.

== Education ==
It is in Manhattan Elementary School District and the Manhattan High School District. The elementary and high school districts are parts of Manhattan Public Schools.

Manhattan School District #3 educates students from kindergarten through 12th grade. Manhattan High School's team name is the Tigers. In 2022, the high school had 260 students with 18.8 full-time equivalency teachers.

Manhattan Christian High School is a private school located in nearby Churchill.

Manhattan has a public library, the Manhattan Community Library, which is part of the Manhattan High School.

== Media ==
Manhattan is located in the Bozeman media market.

The FM radio stations KKQX and KPWS-LP are licensed in Manhattan. KKQX airs a variety classic rock music and KPWS-LP is owned by the school district.

== Infrastructure ==
Interstate 90 passes by town, with access via exit 288.

The nearest airport is Bozeman Yellowstone International Airport.

== Popular culture ==
In the mid-1990s the town of Manhattan was featured on the "Real Food for Real People" national advertising campaign by the Beef Industry.
