= West Yellowstone K-12 Schools =

School district in Montana, United States

West Yellowstone K-12 Schools is a school district headquartered in West Yellowstone, Montana.

The district, in Gallatin County, includes West Yellowstone and Hebgen Lake Estates. The district has elementary, middle, and high school divisions.

== History ==
On September 2, 1969, there were 228 students in the district, including 66 in the high school grades.

In 1969 the district was creating a music room from a previous bus garage so a music program could be established there.

After Yellowstone National Park School closed in 2008, this district began to receive money for the education of students living on Yellowstone National Park via Public Law 504; Gardiner Public Schools also did so.

Lael Calton was superintendent and the elementary school principal until her 2014 resignation.

In 2016, Kevin Flanagan became the district superintendent.

Debra Fountain was superintendent until her 2023 resignation. Kristin Merkel of KBZK-TV stated that the resignation was "unexpected". Fountain moved away from West Yellowstone and stated that de facto she did not have decision making power.
