= KBZM =

- Big Sky, Montana; United States
- Broadcast area: Bozeman, Montana
- Frequency: 104.7 MHz
- Branding: Eagle 104.7

Programming
- Format: Classic rock

Ownership
- Owner: Orion Media LLC
- Sister stations: KKQX, KSCY

History
- First air date: November 2003
- Former call signs: KBFN (1997–2003)
- Call sign meaning: BoZeMan

Technical information
- Licensing authority: FCC
- Facility ID: 81679
- Class: C1
- ERP: 5,000 watts
- HAAT: 1017 meters (3339 feet)
- Transmitter coordinates: 45°16′41″N 111°26′57″W

Links
- Public license information: Public file; LMS
- Webcast: Listen Live
- Website: montanassuperstation.com

KBZM (104.7 FM, "Eagle 104.7") is a radio station licensed to Big Sky, Montana and reaches a substantial geographic area largely unserved by other signals. The station is owned by Orion Media LLC. It airs a variety classic rock music format.

Studios, along with KSCY and KKQX, are at 8274 Huffine Lane, on the west side of Bozeman, near Four Corners. KBZM also maintains an office and studio in Big Sky as well. KBZM's transmitter and tower site are west of Big Sky, on top of Lone Mountain at Big Sky Resort, elevation 11,166 feet. It is the highest FM transmitter site in the great Northwest, and 3rd highest in the United States.

The station was assigned the KBZM call letters by the Federal Communications Commission on November 5, 2003.

It's an affiliate of the "Floydian Slip" syndicated Pink Floyd program.

== History ==
KBZM signed-on in November 2003 at 104.5 in Big Sky. The owners had the opportunity to upgrade the station to a class C1 (2004) and in doing so moved the frequency to 104.7. KBZM serves all of southwestern Montana along with a portion of Yellowstone National Park. KBZM's sister station KKQX signed on in late 2005, airing the same format but more directly serving the population center in the Gallatin Valley. Both stations are branded as The Eagle and together are known as "Montana's Superstation," due to the extensive coverage provided by the two signals at 104.7 and 105.7.
