= Amsterdam, Montana =

- CDP
- Location of Amsterdam-Churchill, Montana
- Coordinates: 45°45′02″N 111°19′40″W
- Country: United States
- State: Montana
- County: Gallatin

Area
  - Total: 2.73 sq mi (7.06 km^{2})
  - Land: 2.71 sq mi (7.01 km^{2})
  - Water: 0.019 sq mi (0.05 km^{2})
- Elevation: 4,488 ft (1,368 m)

Population (2020)
  - Total: 206
  - Density: 76.1/sq mi (29.38/km^{2})
- Time zone: UTC-7 (Mountain (MST))
  - Summer (DST): UTC-6 (MDT)
- Area code: 406
- FIPS code: 30-01550
- GNIS ID: 2629942

Amsterdam is a census-designated place (CDP) in Gallatin County, Montana, United States. The population was 206 at the 2020 census. It is part of the Bozeman, MT Micropolitan Statistical Area. It was formerly part of the Amsterdam-Churchill CDP.

== Geography ==
According to the United States Census Bureau, the CDP has a total area of 2.7 square miles (7.0 km^{2}), all land.

The area near town is agricultural, so fields and small creeks are plentiful. The town is bordered by the Camp Creek on the west and Valley Ditch to the north. Though part of the immense Gallatin National Forest, there are few trees in the area. Located in the Gallatin valley, Amsterdam has views of the Bridger Mountains to the north, and the Gallatin Mountains to the south.

== History ==
Originally called Walrath for farmer A. J. Walrath, Amsterdam was established in 1911 by the Northern Pacific Railway on a branch line between Manhattan and Anceney. The railroad changed the name to Amsterdam because of the large number of Dutch settlers. The settlers moved to the area in the 1890s to grow malting barley to supply the Manhattan Malting Company.

== Demographics ==
Historical population
Census	Pop.	Note	%±
2020	206		—
U.S. Decennial Census

== Education ==
It is in Amsterdam Elementary School District and the Manhattan High School District. The high school district is a part of Manhattan Public Schools.

Elementary students in public schools attend either Amsterdam School or Manhattan Elementary School. High school students attend Manhattan High School. In 2022, the high school had 260 students with 18.8 full-time equivalency teachers.

== Media ==
Amsterdam is located in the Bozeman media market.

Local news is published in the Bozeman Daily Chronicle.

== Infrastructure ==
Amsterdam is located 8 miles (13 km) south of Interstate 90 and 7 miles (11 km) west of Montana Highway 85.

The nearest airport is Bozeman Yellowstone International Airport.
