= Montana Highway 64 =

State highway in Montana, United States

Montana Highway 64
- Big Sky Road
- MT 64 highlighted in red

Route information
- Maintained by MDT
- Length: 9.039 mi (14.547 km)

Major junctions
- West end: Mountain Village, Big Sky Resort
- East end: US 191 41 miles south of Bozeman

Location
- Country: United States
- State: Montana
- Counties: Madison, Gallatin

Highway system
- Montana Highway System; Interstate; US; State; Secondary
← MT 59	→ MT 66

Highway 64 (MT 64) is a 9.039-mile (14.547 km) state highway in Madison and Gallatin counties in Montana, United States. that connects the Mountain Village area of Big Sky Resort to an intersection with U.S. Route 191 (US 191) in Gallatin Canyon, about 41 miles (66 km) south of Bozeman. Meadow Village, the primary residential area of Big Sky, is approximately 2 miles (3.2 km) west of the US 191 intersection.

The road was constructed in the 1970s as part of the development of the Big Sky resort complex.

== Major intersections ==
The entire route is in Big Sky.

County	mi	km	Destinations	Notes
Madison	0.000	0.000	Big Sky Road west – Big Sky Resort	Western terminus; Continuation past end of state maintenance
Gallatin	9.039	14.547	US 191 – West Yellowstone, Bozeman	Eastern terminus
1.000 mi = 1.609 km; 1.000 km = 0.621 mi

== See also ==
- list of state highways in Montana
