= Gallatin County, Montana =

County in Montana, United States

- County
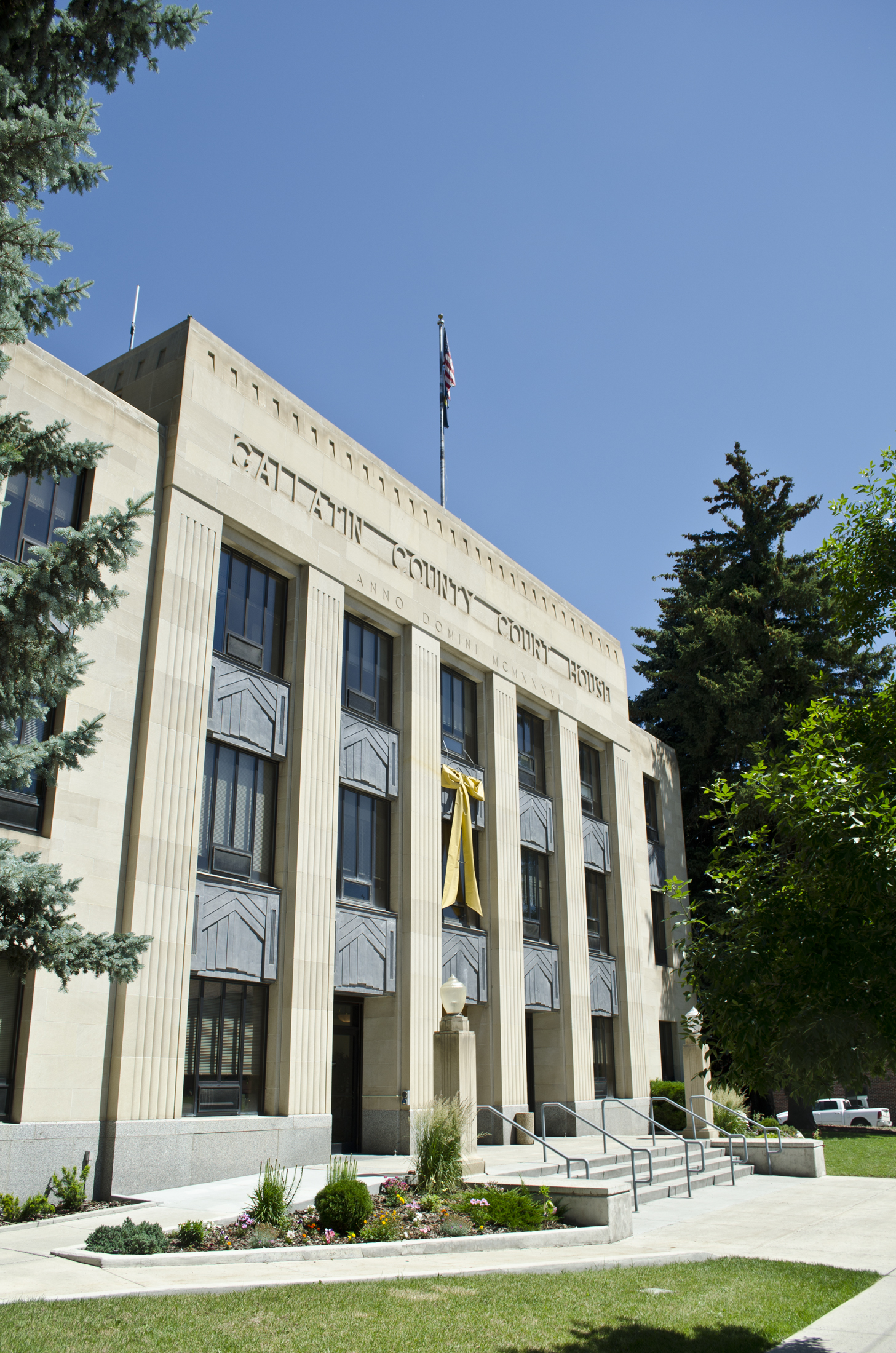
- Gallatin County Courthouse in Bozeman

- Seal

- Location within the U.S. state of Montana
- Coordinates: 45.56°N 111.17°W
- Country: United States
- State: Montana
- Founded: 1865
- Named for: Gallatin River (Albert Gallatin)
- Seat: Bozeman
- Largest city: Bozeman

Area
  - Total: 2,632 sq mi (6,820 km^{2})
  - Land: 2,603 sq mi (6,740 km^{2})
  - Water: 29 sq mi (75 km^{2}) 1.1%

Population (2020)
  - Total: 118,960
  - Estimate (2025): 128,740 ▲
  - Density: 45.70/sq mi (17.65/km^{2})
- Time zone: UTC−7 (Mountain)
  - Summer (DST): UTC−6 (MDT)
- Congressional district: 1st
- Website: www.gallatinmt.gov
- Montana county number 06

Gallatin County is a county located in the U.S. state of Montana. With its county seat in Bozeman, it is the second-most-populous county in Montana, with a population of 118,960 in the 2020 census.

The county's prominent geographical features are the Bridger Range in the north and the Gallatin Range and Gallatin River in the south, named by Meriwether Lewis in 1805 for Albert Gallatin, the United States Treasury Secretary who formulated the Lewis and Clark Expedition.

At the southern end of the county, West Yellowstone's entrance into Yellowstone National Park accounts for around half of all park visitors. Big Sky Resort, one of the largest ski resorts in the United States, lies in Gallatin and neighboring Madison Counties, midway between Bozeman and West Yellowstone.

== History ==
During the territorial era, a small patch of land known as "Lost Dakota" existed as a remote exclave of Dakota Territory until it was transferred to Gallatin County, Montana Territory, in 1873.

== Geography ==
According to the United States Census Bureau, the county has a total area of 2,632 square miles (6,820 km^{2}), of which 29 square miles (75 km^{2}) (1.1%) are covered by water. The county attained its present boundaries in 1978, when the former Yellowstone National Park (part) county-equivalent was dissolved and apportioned between Gallatin and Park Counties. Gallatin County received 99.155 square miles (256.8 km^{2}) of land area and 0.119 square miles (0.3 km^{2}) of water area, whereas Park County received 146.229 square miles (378.7 km^{2}) of land area and 0.608 square miles (1.6 km^{2}) of water area. The geographies transferred are known now as Census Tract 14 in Gallatin County, and as Census Tract 6 in Park County.

=== Major highways ===
- Interstate 90
- U.S. Highway 20
- U.S. Highway 191
- U.S. Highway 287
- Montana Highway 2
- Montana Highway 64
- Montana Highway 84
- Montana Highway 85
- Montana Highway 86
- Montana Secondary Highway 205

=== Transit ===
- Jefferson Lines

=== Adjacent counties ===
- Madison County - west
- Jefferson County - northwest
- Broadwater County - north
- Meagher County - northeast
- Park County - east
- Park County, Wyoming - southeast
- Teton County, Wyoming - southeast
- Fremont County, Idaho - southwest

=== National protected areas ===
- Gallatin National Forest (part)
- Yellowstone National Park (part)

== Demographics ==
Historical population
Census	Pop.	Note	%±
1870	1,578		—
1880	3,643		130.9%
1890	6,246		71.5%
1900	9,553		52.9%
1910	14,079		47.4%
1920	15,864		12.7%
1930	16,124		1.6%
1940	18,269		13.3%
1950	21,902		19.9%
1960	26,045		18.9%
1970	32,505		24.8%
1980	42,865		31.9%
1990	50,463		17.7%
2000	67,831		34.4%
2010	89,513		32.0%
2020	118,960		32.9%
2025 (est.)	128,740	▲	8.2%
U.S. Decennial Census; 1790–1960, 1900–1990, 1990–2000, 2010–2020

=== 2020 census ===
As of the 2020 census, the county had a population of 118,960 and 47,117 households; 19.8% of residents were under 18, and 13.2% were 65 or older; there were 107.4 males for every 100 females (108.8 for every 100 females 18 and over), and 65.2% of residents lived in urban areas, while 34.8% lived in rural areas. The median age was 33.4 years, compared with 40.1 years in Montana.

In terms of ancestry, 25.4% were German, 14.8% were Irish, 12.4% were English, 8.8% were Norwegian, 4.6% were Italian, 4.0% were French, 3.5% were Scottish, 2.2% were Polish, and 0.3% were sub-Saharan African.

The population density was 45.2 inhabitants per square mile (17.5/km^{2}). The 52,835 housing units in the county had an average density of 20.1 per square mile (7.8/km^{2}).

The racial makeup of the county was 89.0% White, 0.4% Black or African American, 0.9% American Indian and Alaska Native, 1.2% Asian, 1.8% from some other race, and 6.6% from two or more races. Hispanic or Latino residents of any race comprised 5.0% of the population.

Of the 47,117 households in the county, 26.8% had children under 18 living with them, 21.9% had a female householder with no spouse or partner present, about 25.9% were made up of individuals, and 8.2% had someone living alone who was 65 or older; 48.2% were married-couple family households, 23.9% were male householders with no spouse present, 20.4% were female householders with no spouse present, and the average family size was 2.96.

Among occupied housing units, 59.9% were owner-occupied and 40.1% were renter-occupied; the homeowner vacancy rate was 1.4% and the rental vacancy rate was 4.9%.

The median household income was $75,418, significantly higher than the $57,153 median household income in Montana; 11.9% of the population was below the poverty line, including 6.9% of those under 18 and 6.5% of those 65 or older.

=== 2010 census ===
As of the 2010 census, 89,513 people, 36,550 households, and 21,263 families were living in the county. The population density was 34.4 inhabitants per square mile (13.3/km^{2}). The 42,289 housing units had an average density of 16.2 per square mile (6.3/km^{2}). The racial makeup of the county was 95.1% White, 1.1% Asian, 0.9% American Indian, 0.3% Black or African American, 0.1% Pacific Islander, 0.7% from other races, and 1.9% from two or more races. Those of Hispanic or Latino origin made up 2.8% of the population. In terms of ancestry, 32.2% were German, 18.1% were Irish, 14.7% were English, 9.4% were Norwegian, and 3.5% were American.

Of the 36,550 households, 27.8% had children under 18 living with them, 47.8% were married couples living together, 6.6% had a female householder with no husband present, 41.8% were not families, and 27.3% of all households were made up of individuals. The average household size was 2.36, and the average family size was 2.90. The median age was 32.5 years.

The median income in the county for a household was $50,136 and for a family was $65,029. Males had a median income of $42,245 versus $31,349 for females. The per capita income for the county was $27,423. About 7.4% of families and 13.5% of the population were below the poverty line, including 12.5% of those under 18 and 8.2% of those 65 or over.

== Government and politics ==
Gallatin County has traditionally favored Republican presidential candidates, often by large margins. Recent changes to Gallatin County's demographics have made the county more competitive.

Gallatin County is home to the flagship campus of Montana State University.

Democratic candidates Barack Obama and Hillary Clinton narrowly won Gallatin County in 2008 and 2016, respectively, with Republican Mitt Romney winning the county in 2012.

In 2020, Democratic candidate Joe Biden won Gallatin County by the largest margin for a Democrat since Franklin Delano Roosevelt's victory in 1940. Democrat Kamala Harris won the county in 2024, marking the first time the county voted for a Democrat who lost the popular vote since 1900.

United States presidential election results for Gallatin County, Montana
Year	Republican		Democratic		Third party(ies)	
Year	No.	%	No.	%	No.	%
1892	998	43.32%	1,144	49.65%	162	7.03%
1896	423	20.07%	1,649	78.23%	36	1.71%
1900	1,146	45.53%	1,297	51.53%	74	2.94%
1904	1,700	55.77%	1,130	37.07%	218	7.15%
1908	1,519	47.19%	1,485	46.13%	215	6.68%
1912	683	21.07%	1,407	43.41%	1,151	35.51%
1916	2,527	40.07%	3,661	58.06%	118	1.87%
1920	3,238	54.70%	2,370	40.03%	312	5.27%
1924	2,494	44.35%	1,564	27.81%	1,565	27.83%
1928	3,861	61.11%	2,423	38.35%	34	0.54%
1932	2,553	35.98%	4,359	61.44%	183	2.58%
1936	2,151	30.01%	4,697	65.53%	320	4.46%
1940	3,430	41.84%	4,718	57.55%	50	0.61%
1944	3,120	47.04%	3,479	52.46%	33	0.50%
1948	4,220	53.08%	3,548	44.63%	182	2.29%
1952	6,998	71.93%	2,697	27.72%	34	0.35%
1956	6,680	67.20%	3,260	32.80%	0	0.00%
1960	6,870	64.49%	3,761	35.31%	21	0.20%
1964	5,621	49.97%	5,600	49.79%	27	0.24%
1968	7,433	62.06%	3,818	31.88%	727	6.07%
1972	10,663	66.28%	5,096	31.68%	329	2.05%
1976	11,062	63.36%	6,215	35.60%	183	1.05%
1980	12,738	58.63%	5,747	26.45%	3,241	14.92%
1984	15,643	64.80%	8,163	33.82%	334	1.38%
1988	13,214	56.94%	9,527	41.06%	464	2.00%
1992	11,109	38.60%	9,535	33.13%	8,135	28.27%
1996	14,559	50.07%	10,972	37.73%	3,547	12.20%
2000	18,833	58.78%	10,009	31.24%	3,198	9.98%
2004	22,392	56.20%	16,405	41.18%	1,045	2.62%
2008	22,578	46.77%	24,205	50.14%	1,489	3.08%
2012	24,358	50.84%	21,961	45.84%	1,589	3.32%
2016	23,802	44.23%	24,246	45.05%	5,771	10.72%
2020	31,696	44.65%	37,044	52.18%	2,248	3.17%
2024	32,695	46.77%	34,938	49.98%	2,267	3.24%

== Communities ==
=== Cities ===
- Belgrade
- Bozeman (county seat)
- Three Forks

=== Towns ===
- Manhattan
- West Yellowstone

=== Census-designated places ===
- Amsterdam (formerly Amsterdam-Churchill)
- Big Sky
- Bridger
- Churchill (formerly Amsterdam-Churchill)
- Four Corners
- Gallatin Gateway
- Gallatin River Ranch
- Hebgen Lake Estates
- King Arthur Park
- Logan
- Ponderosa Pines
- Sedan
- Springhill
- Willow Creek

=== Unincorporated communities ===
- Hillman
- Maudlow

== Education ==
Unified K-12 districts include:

- Big Sky School K-12
- West Yellowstone K-12

The Belgrade elementary and high school districts are both a part of Belgrade Public Schools. The Bozeman elementary and high school districts are both a part of Bozeman Public Schools. The Manhattan elementary and high school districts are both a part of Manhattan Public Schools. The Three Forks elementary and high school districts are both a part of Three Forks Public Schools. The Willow Creek elementary and high school districts are both a part of Willow Creek Public Schools.

High school districts include:

- Belgrade High School District
- Bozeman High School District
- Manhattan High School District
- Three Forks High School District
- Willow Creek High School District

Elementary school districts include:

- Amsterdam Elementary School District
- Anderson Elementary School District
- Belgrade Elementary School District
- Bozeman Elementary School District
- Cottonwood Elementary School District
- Gallatin Gateway Elementary School District
- LaMotte Elementary School District
- Malmborg Elementary School District
- Manhattan School
- Monforton Elementary School District
- Pass Creek Elementary School District
- Shields Valley Elementary School District
- Springhill Elementary School District
- Three Forks Elementary School District
- Willow Creek Elementary School District

== Notable people ==
- Zales Ecton, a U.S. senator from Montana, lived in Gallatin County.
- Stan Jones lives and works in Gallatin County.
- Steve Daines, a U.S. Senator from Montana, lived in Gallatin County.

== See also ==
- List of lakes in Gallatin County, Montana
- List of mountains in Gallatin County, Montana
- National Register of Historic Places listings in Gallatin County, Montana
- Lost Dakota
