= Hebgen Lake Estates, Montana =

- Census-designated place
- Location within Montana Location within the United States
- Coordinates: 44°46′9″N 111°11′26″W
- Country: United States
- State: Montana
- County: Gallatin

Area
  - Total: 0.19 sq mi (0.48 km^{2})
  - Land: 0.19 sq mi (0.48 km^{2})
  - Water: 0 sq mi (0.00 km^{2})
- Elevation: 6,565 ft (2,001 m)

Population (2020)
  - Total: 123
  - Density: 667.5/sq mi (257.73/km^{2})
- Time zone: UTC-7 (Mountain (MST))
  - Summer (DST): UTC-6 (MDT)
- Area code: 406
- FIPS code: 30-35435
- GNIS feature ID: 2583814

Hebgen Lake Estates is a census-designated place (CDP) in Gallatin County, Montana, United States. As of the 2020 census, Hebgen Lake Estates had a population of 123. It is next to Hebgen Lake.

== Demographics ==
Historical population
| Census | Pop. | Note | %± |
|---|---|---|---|
| 2020 | 123 | | — |
U.S. Decennial Census

== Education ==
The CDP is in the West Yellowstone K-12 school district.
