= KKQX =

- Manhattan, Montana; United States
- Broadcast area: Bozeman, Montana
- Frequency: 105.7 MHz
- Branding: The Eagle

Programming
- Format: Classic rock (KBZM simulcast)

Ownership
- Owner: Silver Star Communications, Inc.; (Silver Star Communications, Inc.)
- Sister stations: KBZM, KSCY

History
- First air date: 2003

Technical information
- Licensing authority: FCC
- Facility ID: 164232
- Class: C2
- ERP: 12,300 watts
- HAAT: 208 meters (683 feet)
- Transmitter coordinates: 45°38′16″N 111°16′05″W

Links
- Public license information: Public file; LMS
- Webcast: Listen Live
- Website: montanassuperstation.com

KKQX (105.7 FM) is a radio station licensed to Manhattan, Montana. The station is owned and operated by Silver Star Communications, Inc. It airs a variety classic rock music format.

Studios, along with KBZM and KSCY, are at 8274 Huffine Lane, on the west side of Bozeman, near Four Corners. Its transmitter site is off Highway 84, southwest of Four Corners. KKQX, together with KBZM, are more commonly known as "The Eagle" and own the service mark "Montana's Superstation."

The station was assigned the KKQX call letters by the Federal Communications Commission on October 29, 2005.

It's an affiliate of the "Floydian Slip" syndicated Pink Floyd program.

== History ==
KBZM signed on in November 2003 at 104.7 in Big Sky. KKQX went on the air in late 2005, airing the same format as KBZM, and more directly serving the population center in the Gallatin Valley with the Eagle's brand of music. The transmitter site on the west side of Bozeman in the heart of the Gallatin Valley.
