= Gallatin River Ranch, Montana =

- Census-designated place
- Location within Montana Location within the United States
- Coordinates: 45°54′11″N 111°19′46″W
- Country: United States
- State: Montana
- County: Gallatin

Area
  - Total: 7.12 sq mi (18.43 km^{2})
  - Land: 7.08 sq mi (18.33 km^{2})
  - Water: 0.042 sq mi (0.11 km^{2})
- Elevation: 4,479 ft (1,365 m)

Population (2020)
  - Total: 117
  - Density: 16.5/sq mi (6.38/km^{2})
- Time zone: UTC-7 (Mountain (MST))
  - Summer (DST): UTC-6 (MDT)
- Area code: 406
- FIPS code: 30-01550
- GNIS feature ID: 2583810

Gallatin River Ranch is a census-designated place (CDP) in Gallatin County, Montana, United States. As of the 2020 census, Gallatin River Ranch had a population of 117.

== Demographics ==
Historical population
Census	Pop.	Note	%±
2020	117		—
U.S. Decennial Census

== Education ==
It is in Manhattan Elementary School District and the Manhattan High School District. The elementary and high school districts are parts of Manhattan Public Schools.
