= Ponderosa Pines, Montana =

- Census-designated place
- Location within Montana Location within the United States
- Coordinates: 46°01′52″N 111°22′02″W
- Country: United States
- State: Montana
- County: Gallatin

Area
  - Total: 39.88 sq mi (103.28 km^{2})
  - Land: 39.64 sq mi (102.68 km^{2})
  - Water: 0.23 sq mi (0.60 km^{2})
- Elevation: 4,656 ft (1,419 m)

Population (2020)
  - Total: 665
  - Density: 16.8/sq mi (6.48/km^{2})
- Time zone: UTC-7 (Mountain (MST))
  - Summer (DST): UTC-6 (MDT)
- Area code: 406
- FIPS code: 30-58840
- GNIS feature ID: 2583834

Ponderosa Pines is a census-designated place (CDP) in Gallatin County, Montana, United States. As of the 2020 census, Ponderosa Pines had a population of 665. Formerly a 13,000-acre ranch, the land was subdivided into 10- and 20-acre parcels and sold by a Hawaiian real estate agency starting in 1972. The lots lacked water, sewer, electricity and road access, and some were on such steep terrain that building would be impossible.

== Demographics ==
Historical population
Census	Pop.	Note	%±
2020	665		—
U.S. Decennial Census

== Education ==
Most of the CDP is in the Three Forks Elementary School District and the Three Forks High School District. A small portion is in Pass Creek Elementary School District and the Manhattan High School District. The Three Forks elementary and high school districts are both a part of Three Forks Public Schools. The Manhattan high school district is a part of Manhattan Public Schools.
