= Montana Highway 86 =

State highway in Montana, United States

Montana Highway 86
- MT 86 highlighted in red

Route information
- Maintained by MDT
- Length: 37.498 mi (60.347 km)

Major junctions
- South end: I-90 BL / US 191 in Bozeman
- North end: US 89 near Wilsall

Location
- Country: United States
- State: Montana
- Counties: Gallatin; Park

Highway system
- Montana Highway System; Interstate; US; State; Secondary
← MT 85	→ US 87

Highway 86 (MT 86) is a 37.498-mile-long (60.347 km) north–south state highway in the U.S. State of Montana. MT 86's southern terminus is at I-90 Bus. and U.S. Route 191 (US 191) in the city of Bozeman and the northern terminus is at an intersection with US 89 north of the town of Wilsall. Much of the route follows the eastern flank of the Bridger Mountains, and the road provides access to the Bridger Bowl ski resort.

Before receiving its current designation, Highway 86 was designated as Montana Secondary Highway 293.

== Route description ==
MT 86 begins at the intersection of Rouse Avenue and East Main Street, which carries US 191, in downtown Bozeman. It heads north on Rouse along a two-lane street through a residential area. In the northern part of town, MT 86 crosses the Montana Rail Link while simultaneously passing beneath Interstate 90. The highway turns to the east and leaves the city; it skirts the southern edge of the Bridger Range. It passes beneath the "College M", a 250-by-100-foot (76 m × 30 m) limestone majuscule M built into the side of Old Baldy within sight of Bozeman and Montana State University. The highway curves around the eastern flank of the mountain range and follows a northerly path.

MT 86 travels through mountainous terrain. Coniferous trees line either side of the road's right-of-way. It passes the Bridger Bowl Ski Area, which lies to the west. Shortly thereafter, it meets Brackett Creek Road, which roughly marks the halfway point of the route. The forest surrounding the highway yields to grassland and the terrain levels somewhat as the road turns to the north-northeast near Sedan. The highway takes a sharp curve to the east and then angles to the northeast. The road ends at US 89 a few miles north of Wilsall.

== Major intersections ==
County	Location	mi	km	Destinations	Notes
Gallatin	Bozeman	0.000	0.000	I-90 BL / US 191 (E. Main Street)	Southern terminus
Gallatin		18.774	30.214	Brackett Creek Road	
Park		37.498	60.347	US 89	Northern terminus
1.000 mi = 1.609 km; 1.000 km = 0.621 mi
