= U.S. Route 191 =

Numbered Highway in the United States

U.S. Route 191
- US 191 highlighted in red; the gap represents the unofficial segment through Yellowstone National Park

Route information
- Auxiliary route of US 91
- Length: 1,652.80 mi (2,659.92 km)
- Existed: 1926–present

Major junctions
- South end: SR 80 in Douglas, AZ
- I-10 in Willcox, AZ; I-40 in Sanders, AZ; US 491 in Monticello, UT; I-70 / US 6 / US 50 by Green River, UT; US 6 in Price, UT; US 40 in Duchesne and Vernal, UT; I-80 / US 30 in Rock Springs, WY; I-90 in Bozeman, MT; US 2 in Malta, MT
- North end: Highway 4 at the Canadian border near Loring, MT

Location
- Country: United States
- States: Arizona, Utah, Wyoming, Montana

Highway system
- United States Numbered Highway System; List; Special; Divided
National Forest Scenic Byway

U.S. Route 191 (US 191) is a north–south highway in the Western United States and a spur of parent route U.S. Route 91 that has two segments. The southern segment runs for 1,211 miles (1,949 km) from Douglas, Arizona on the Mexican border to the southern part of Yellowstone National Park. The northern segment runs for 442 miles (711 km) from the northern part of Yellowstone National Park to Loring, Montana, at the Canada–US border. Unnumbered roads within Yellowstone National Park connect the two segments. The highway passes through the states of Arizona, Utah, Wyoming, and Montana.

The highway was designated in 1926 and its routing has changed drastically through the years. The modern US 191 bears almost no resemblance to the original route, which was primarily in the state of Idaho. Most of the current route of US 191 was formed in 1981. Since the extensions in the 1980s and 1990s, U.S. Route 191 is much longer than its parent route to which it no longer connects, and it is one of the longest U.S. three-digit routes.

== Route description ==
Lengths
	mi	km
AZ	516.50	831.23
UT	404.74	651.37
WY	289.40	465.74
MT	442.16	711.59
Total	1,652.80	2,659.92

=== Arizona ===
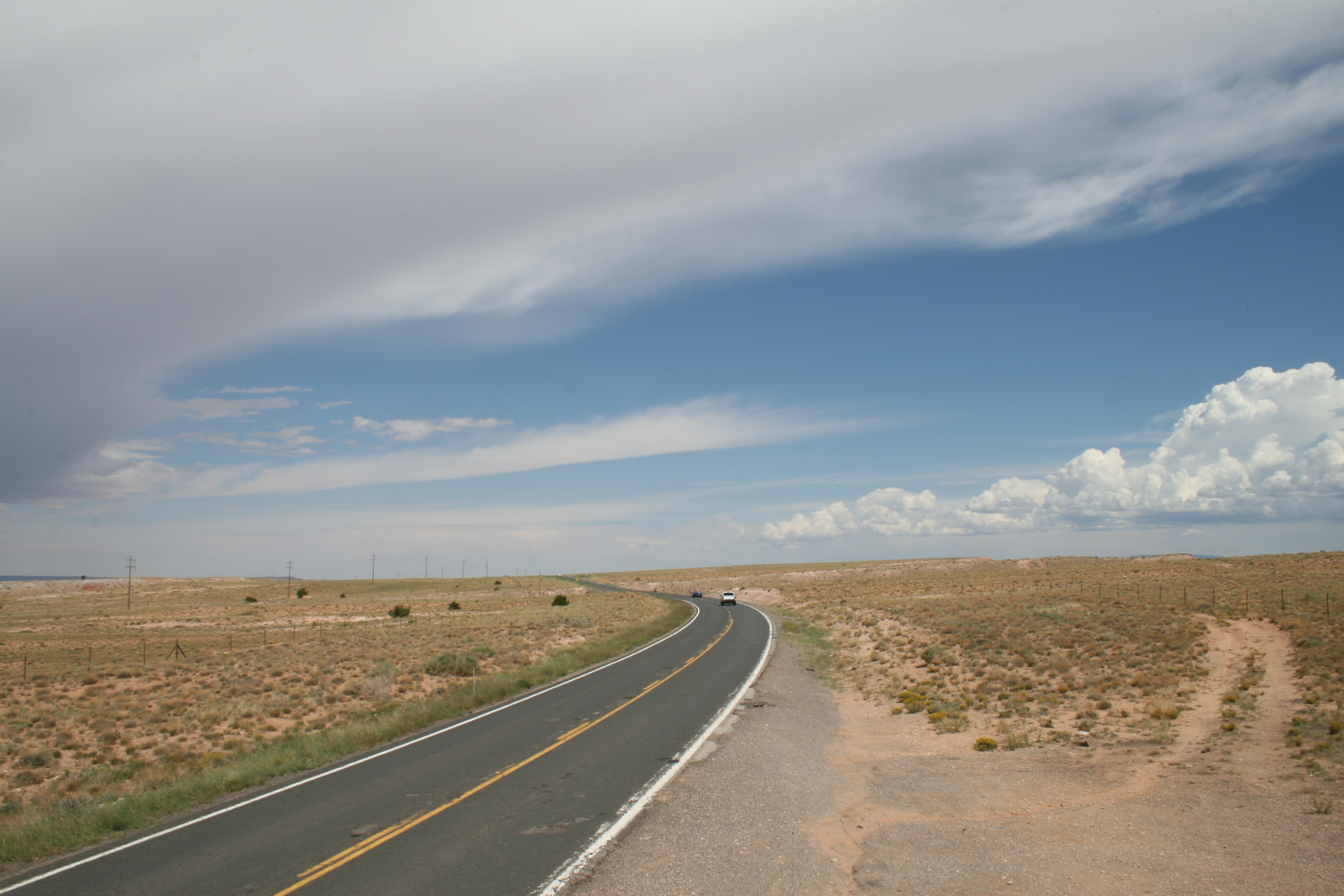
US 191 in Beautiful Valley, Arizona

US 191 begins in Cochise County, Arizona at a signaled intersection with Arizona State Route 80 (SR 80) and Historic U.S. Route 80 (Historic US 80) near Douglas. The highway then proceeds north past Bisbee Douglas International Airport passing through the hamlets of Elfrida and McNeal. Near Sunizona, US 191 intersects with the western terminus of SR 181. US 191 then curves west for 7.5 miles (12.1 km) before turning northwest through Sunsites and Cochise. US 191 intersects Interstate 10 (I-10) near Cochise at a trumpet interchange (I-10 Exit 331). US 191 and I-10 run concurrent for 20.9 miles (33.6 km) around Willcox. In Willcox, I-10/US 191 serves as the northern terminus for SR 186 at Exit 340. The city itself is served by the Willcox I-10 Business Loop, which begins and ends at I-10/US 191 southwest and northeast of the city. In Bowie Junction at Exit 352, US 191 leaves I-10 and heads north, exiting Cochise County and entering Graham County. US 191 has a ten-mile (16 km) overlay with US 70 east of Safford. The route links to State Route 366 (SR 366) and SR 266 to the south of Safford. The route between Springerville and Morenci was designated a National Scenic Byway and given the name of Coronado Trail Scenic Byway, as this approximates the path taken by Francisco Vásquez de Coronado between 1540 and 1542. This is a very dangerous mountain road with many sharp curves and little or no shoulders on steep cliffs. North of the byway, the highway is the primary route to access Canyon de Chelly National Monument. US 191 traverses the Navajo Nation before entering Utah.

US 191 has a detached business route in Arizona, running from SR 80/Historic US 80 in Douglas, along Pan American Ave to the US Customs/Immigration Port of Entry at the border with Mexico. The portion of this route between its intersection with SR 80 near Douglas and the intersection with Interstate 40 at Sanders was formerly the major Arizona portion of US 666. Part of US 191 through the Navajo Nation is designated by the Arizona Department of Transportation as the Tse'nikani Flat Mesa Rock Scenic Road.

=== Utah ===
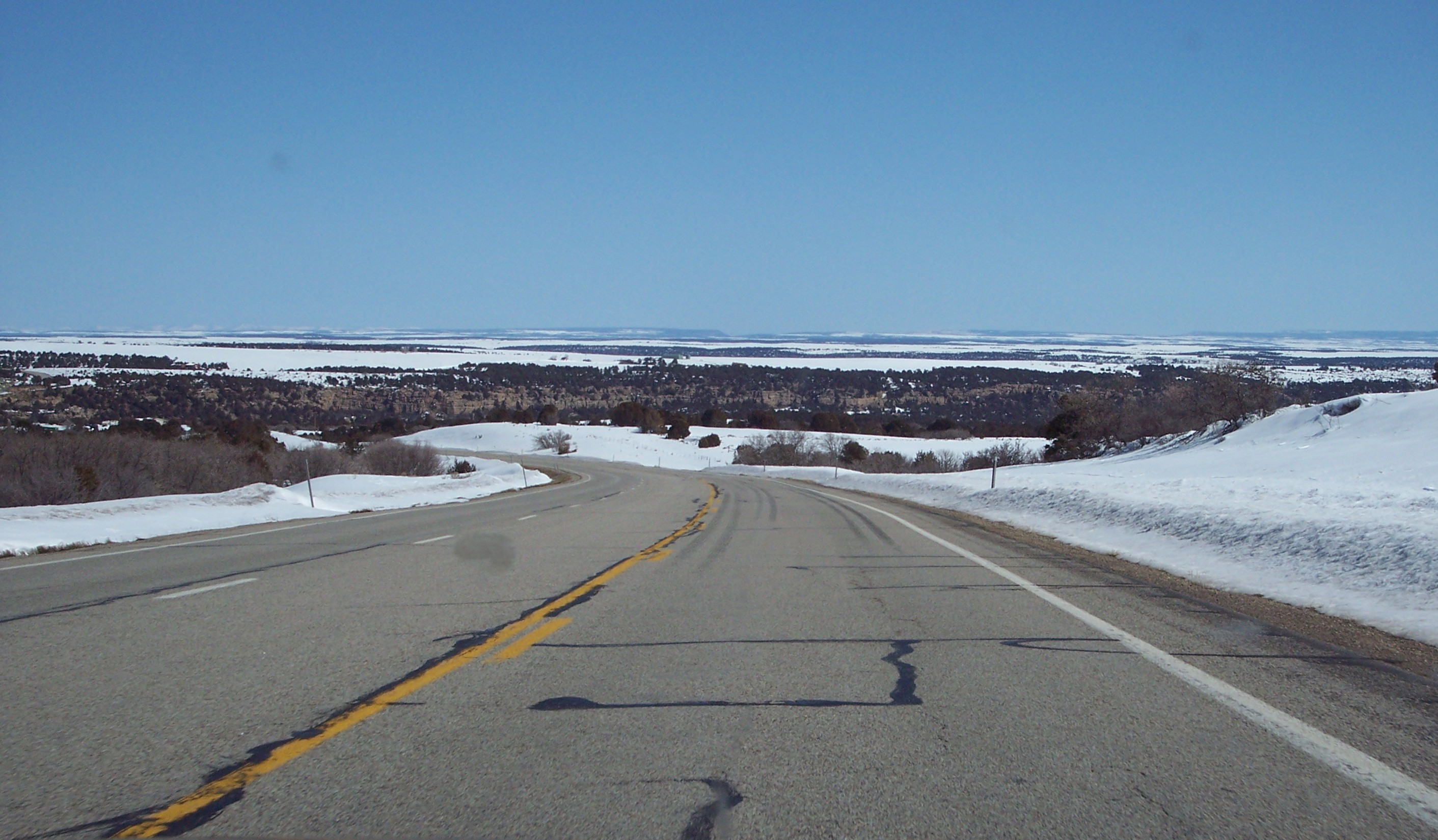
US 191 north of Blanding, Utah

US 191 serves the eastern half of the state. The road enters Utah in a remote portion of the Navajo Nation. The highway passes through mostly desolate areas of eastern Utah. Several portions are National or Utah Scenic Byways. It passes through Bluff, Blanding, Monticello (the seat of San Juan County), and Moab, the largest city in southeastern Utah and the seat of Grand County. It connects with U.S. Routes 6 and 50 as it joins Interstate 70 going due west through the town of Green River, home of the John Wesley Powell Museum. A few miles west of town it splits off with US 6 and continues north between the San Rafael Reef to the west and Book Cliffs to the east through Emery County. It then enters the historic coalfields of Carbon County, passing through Wellington and Price, the largest city in Eastern Utah, home to the USU Eastern Prehistoric museum, and historic Helper, the main stop for Amtrak between Provo, Utah and Grand Junction, Colorado. In addition to linking many rural towns in Utah to I-70 and US 40, the highway served to interconnect several national and state parks for tourism, namely Canyonlands National Park, Arches National Park, Bears Ears National Monument, and Dead Horse Point State Park. The highway exits Utah just after crossing the Flaming Gorge Reservoir.

=== Wyoming ===
US 191 enters Wyoming near a geographical feature known as Minnie's Gap, just east of Flaming Gorge National Recreation Area. The route proceeds north through rugged desert country following an alignment mostly constructed during the 1970s, to a junction with Interstate 80 at Exit 99, just west of Rock Springs. This segment of the route is known locally as "East Flaming Gorge Road."

The route is then concurrent with Interstate 80 eastward for approximately five miles (8.0 km), passing just north of Rock Springs. US 191 diverges northward at Exit 104, following the former route of US 187. Traveling through high desert country, the route passes through Eden, Farson, and Pinedale before meeting US 189 at Daniel Junction. Continuing north, the road traverses increasingly mountainous terrain, entering the Bridger-Teton National Forest and passing through the small community of Bondurant before descending through the narrow Hoback River Canyon to an intersection with US 26 and US 89 at Hoback Junction. The route then follows the Snake River valley northward to Jackson. US 191 is concurrent with US 189 between Daniel Junction and Jackson, and with US 26 and US 89 between Hoback Junction and Jackson.

North of Jackson, US 191 soon enters Grand Teton National Park, running concurrently with US 26 and US 89. The highway meets US 287 at Moran Junction, inside the park; US 191, US 89, and US 287 are concurrent north of Moran, but the highways are not signed. Continuing through forested, mountainous country, the route passes through the John D. Rockefeller Jr. Memorial Parkway before ending at the South Entrance of Yellowstone National Park. While US 191 and other U.S. Routes are officially discontinuous through the park, some commercially produced maps show these highways running inside Yellowstone National Park itself along its unnumbered roads and across the Wyoming–Montana state line.

=== Montana ===
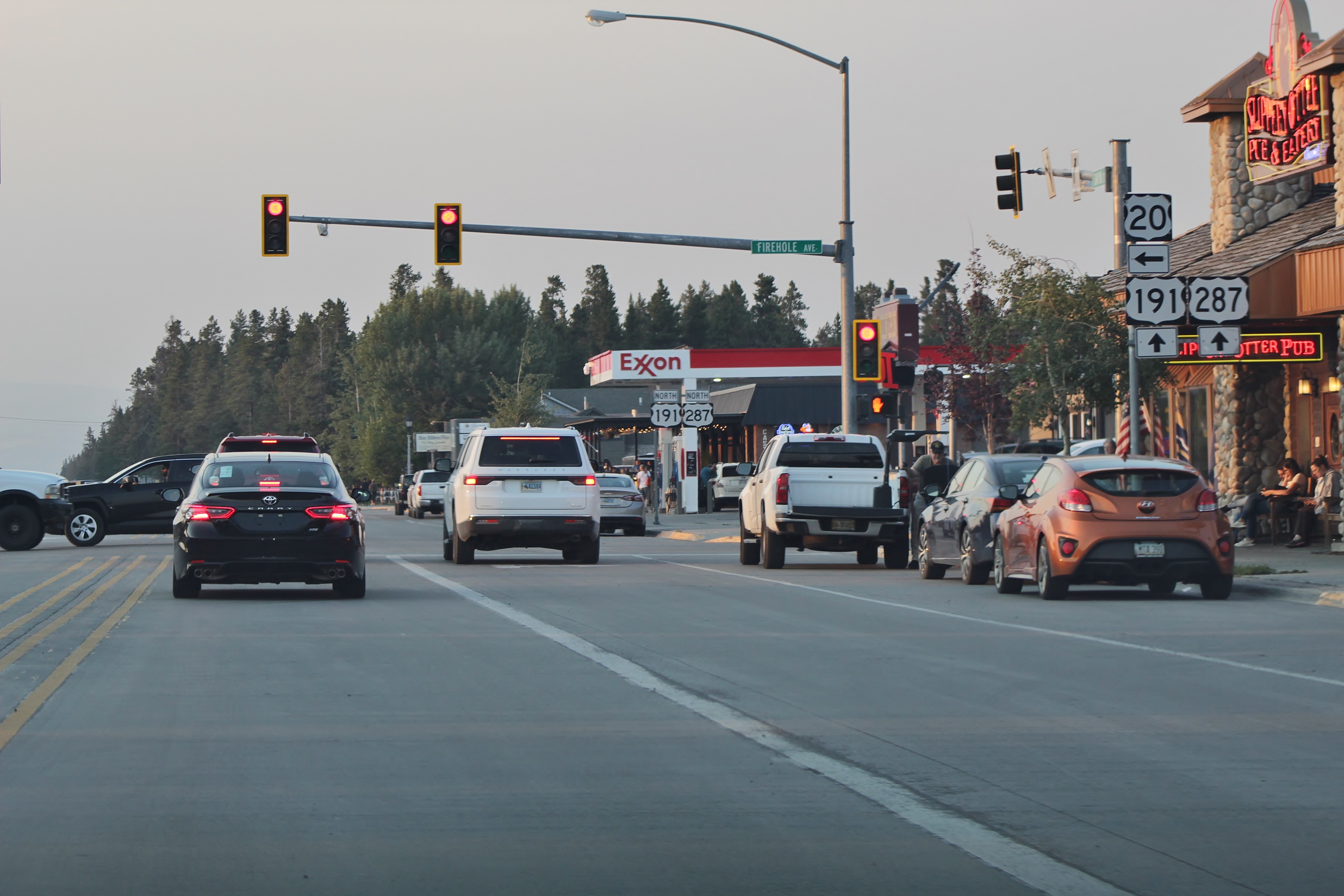
US 191 through West Yellowstone

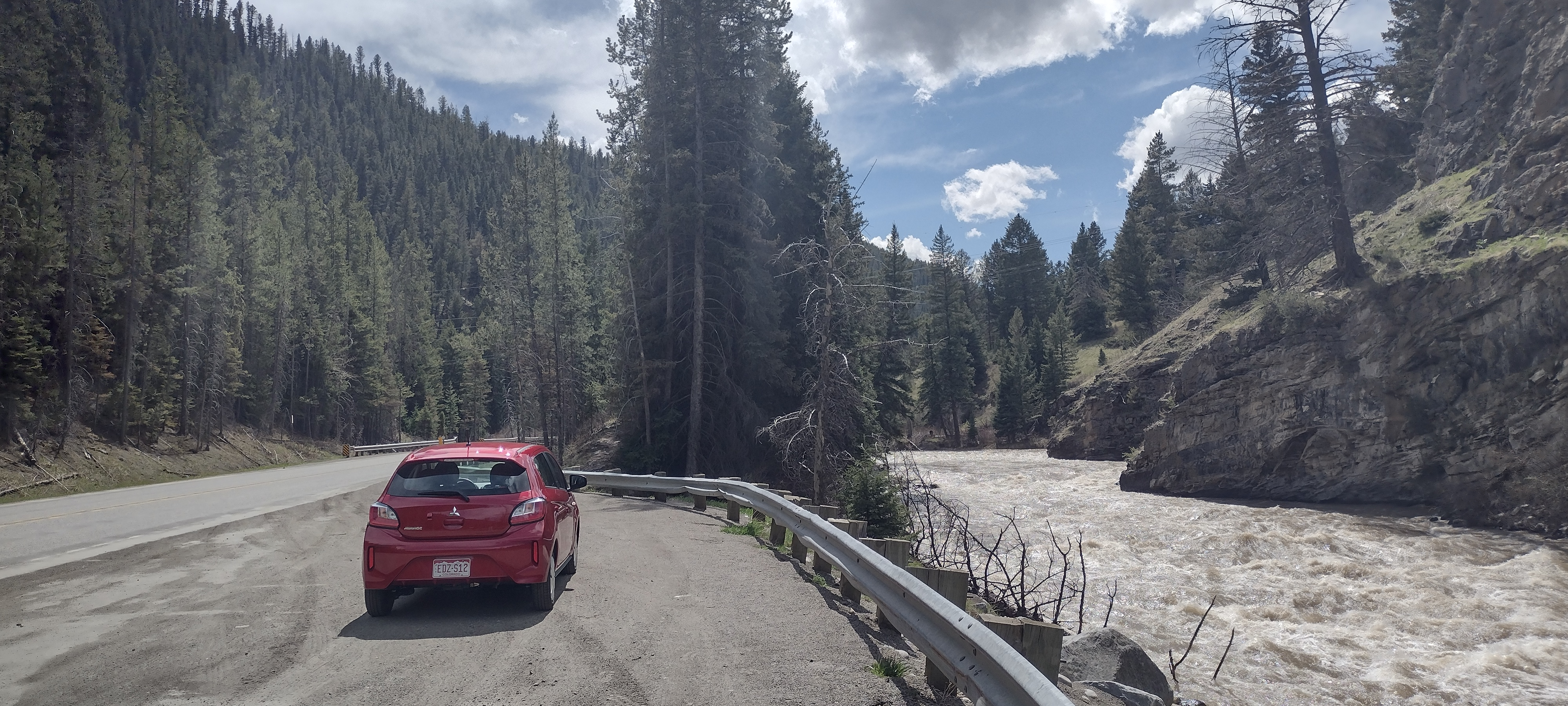
US 191 through the Gallatin River Canyon

US 191 in Montana begins at the West Entrance to Yellowstone National Park, at the edge of the town of West Yellowstone. The highway heads north, running concurrently with US 287 for eight miles (13 km) before veering slightly east and entering Yellowstone. US 191 continues northward through Yellowstone, traversing forested, mountainous terrain and briefly looping into the state of Wyoming, before leaving the park in the upper reaches of the Gallatin River canyon. The route travels northward through the narrow canyon, past the resort community of Big Sky, then entering the Gallatin Valley near the town of Gallatin Gateway, Montana. US 191 travels north and east through the valley to the city of Bozeman, which is the largest city along the entire US 191 route.

From Bozeman, US 191 is concurrent with I-90 eastward 58 miles (93 km) to Big Timber, where it proceeds north. The road travels through hilly ranch country near the eastern edge of the Crazy Mountains to Harlowton, where US 191 is briefly concurrent with US 12. North of Harlowton, US 191 is concurrent with Montana Highway 3 for 37 miles (60 km), to Eddie's Corner. US 191 proceeds eastward from Eddie's Corner to Lewistown, on a roadway shared with US 87 and Montana 200, in a wrong-way concurrency.

US 191 reaches the Canada–US border after going through Lewistown, across the Missouri River at the Charles M. Russell National Wildlife Refuge, and through Malta. It ends at the international border at Port Morgan, and the road continues into Saskatchewan as Highway 4 toward Swift Current.

== History ==
=== Background ===
The routing of US 191 has drastically changed through the years having been extended and shortened several times. The original route designated in 1926 ran from Idaho Falls, Idaho, to West Yellowstone, Montana along the route now numbered U.S. Route 20. West Yellowstone is the only town that has been continuously served by the highway since its commissioning. On February 1, 1935, US 191 was extended over Montana Highway 187 (also known as the Gallatin Way) to Bozeman, Montana.

At one time US 191 connected to its parent, US 91, twice: at Idaho Falls, Idaho and Brigham City, Utah. Today the highway does not connect to its parent, or even enter Idaho. In Utah, there have been 2 completely different iterations of U.S. 191 serving different areas of the state. The original iteration is now State Route 13, which is mostly a frontage road for Interstate 15. In this alignment, the route in between Idaho Falls and the Utah line also paralleled I-15. As US 191 has mostly been extended while US 91 has largely been truncated, US 191 is now ten times longer than its parent.

=== 1981 extension ===
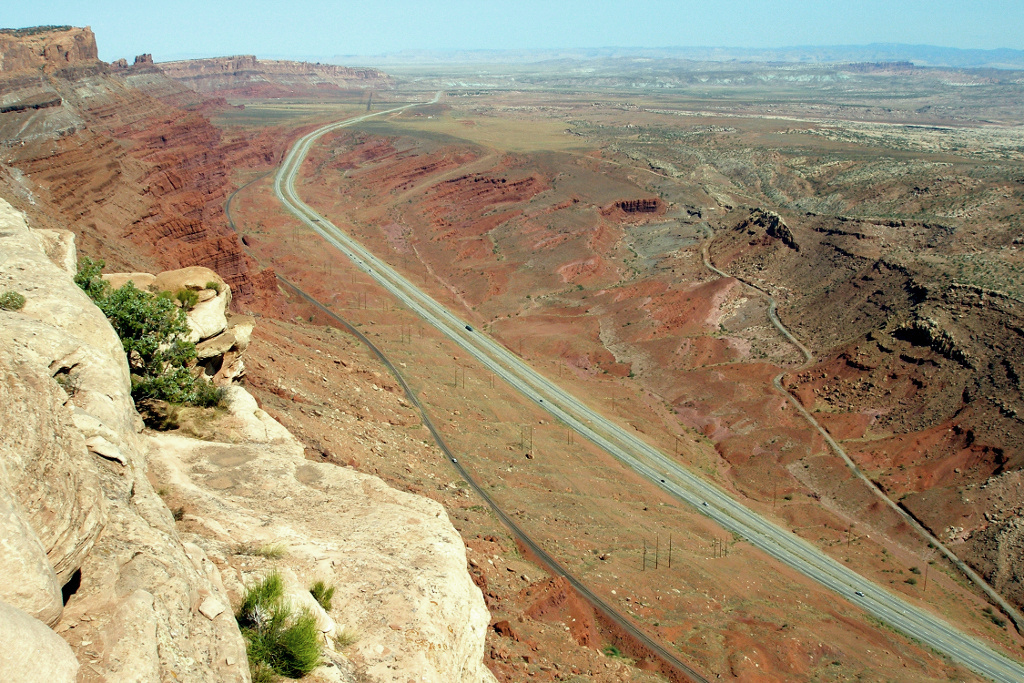
From Gold Bar Rim heading north from Moab - historical highway segment visible along far side of canyon

By 1981, due to the construction of Interstate 15 and extension of other U.S. Highway designations, US 191 had been truncated to a route between West Yellowstone and Malta, Montana. Utah and Wyoming lobbied AASHTO to create a single highway that would connect several National Parks in their states to facilitate tourism. The initial proposal was to extend U.S. Route 163 north into Wyoming. However it was later decided to add Arizona to this proposal for a new highway and instead extend US 191 south. Most of the southern extension recycled existing U.S. and state highways. However, some new sections were constructed. When the 1981 extension was finished, US 191 reached Interstate 40 in Arizona.

In Wyoming, the new US 191 absorbed what was U.S. Route 187, formed in 1926 as a branch from US 87W (now US 287) at Jackson Lake Junction, Wyoming south to US 30 in Rock Springs. Although it became part of US 191 in 1981, the American Association of State Highway and Transportation Officials still lists it in their latest log (1989), with a short independent section in Rock Springs between former US 30 (now US 30 Business) and I-80.

A combination of new construction and the upgrading of county roads created a more direct route between Interstate 80 in Wyoming and Flaming Gorge Reservoir.

Through Utah, US-191 absorbed SR-33, SR-260, and most of SR-44. From Crescent Junction to Bluff was previously numbered U.S. Route 163, eliminating all but a short segment of that route. US 191 was extended over BIA Route 12 from Bluff, Utah to a junction with U.S. Route 160 in Arizona. The 1981 extension caused US 191 to enter Arizona for the first time in its history, ending at I-40 in Chambers, Arizona. Between US 160 and I-40 the highway absorbed the route of former State Route 63.

=== Later extensions ===
In 1992, Arizona requested a new number for its portion of US 666. The state wished to remove the US 666 designation from within Arizona, due to public concerns relating to the biblical reference to the number "666". A secondary reason given by the state was the constant theft of US 666 shields and navigational markers along the highway. As a result, US 191 was extended over I-40 to Sanders, where it absorbed the route of US 666 from Sanders to the Mexican border at Douglas, Arizona. Following the extension of US 191, US 666 was truncated out of Arizona to I-40 in Gallup, New Mexico. In 1996, it became the latest U.S. highway to travel from border to border, with the extension from Malta, Montana to the Canada–US border, absorbing former Montana Secondary Highway 242. In 2003, the remainder of US 666 between I-40 and US 191 in Monticello, Utah was renumbered US 491. The x91 number was decided because the road meets US 191 in Monticello.

== Major intersections ==
Southern segment

Arizona
SR 80 / Historic US 80 in Douglas
I-10 north-northwest of Cochise. The highways travel concurrently to northeast of Willcox.
US 70 in Safford. The highways travel concurrently to San Jose.
US 180 in Alpine. The highways travel concurrently to St. Johns.
US 60 in Springerville. The highways travel concurrently through Springerville.
I-40 in Sanders. The highways travel concurrently to Chambers.
US 160 south-southeast of Mexican Water. The highways travel concurrently to southeast of Mexican Water.
Utah
US 163 in Bluff
US 491 in Monticello
I-70 / US 6 / US 50 west-southwest of Thompson Springs. I-70/US 50/US 191 travels concurrently to west of Green River. US 6/US 191 travels concurrently to north of Helper.
US 40 in Duchesne. The highways travel concurrently to Vernal.
Wyoming
I-80 / US 30 in Purple Sage. The highways travel concurrently to Rock Springs.
US 189 north of Daniel. The highways travel concurrently to Jackson.
US 26 / US 89 in Hoback Junction. US 26/US 191 travels concurrently to Moran. US 89/US 191 travels concurrently to the South Entrance to Yellowstone National Park.
US 26 / US 287 in Moran. US 191/US 287 travels concurrently to the South Entrance to Yellowstone National Park.

Yellowstone National Park segment (unofficial designation)

US 89 travels concurrently from the park's South Entrance to north-northwest of West Thumb.
US 287 travels concurrently from the park's South Entrance to the park's West Entrance.
US 14 / US 16 / US 20 in West Thumb. US 20/US 191 travels concurrently to the park's West Entrance.

Northern segment

Montana
US 20 / US 287 from the West Entrance to Yellowstone National Park; the highways travel concurrently to West Yellowstone.
Wyoming
No major intersections
Montana
I-90 in Bozeman. The highways travel concurrently to southwest of Big Timber.
US 89 in Livingston. The highways travel concurrently to northeast of Livingston.
US 12 in Harlowton. The highways travel concurrently to east of Harlowton.
US 87 west-northwest of Moore. The highways travel concurrently to Lewistown.
US 2 in Malta. The highways travel concurrently through Malta.
Highway 4 at the Canada–United States border north-northeast of Loring
