= Gallatin River =

River in Wyoming and Montana, United States

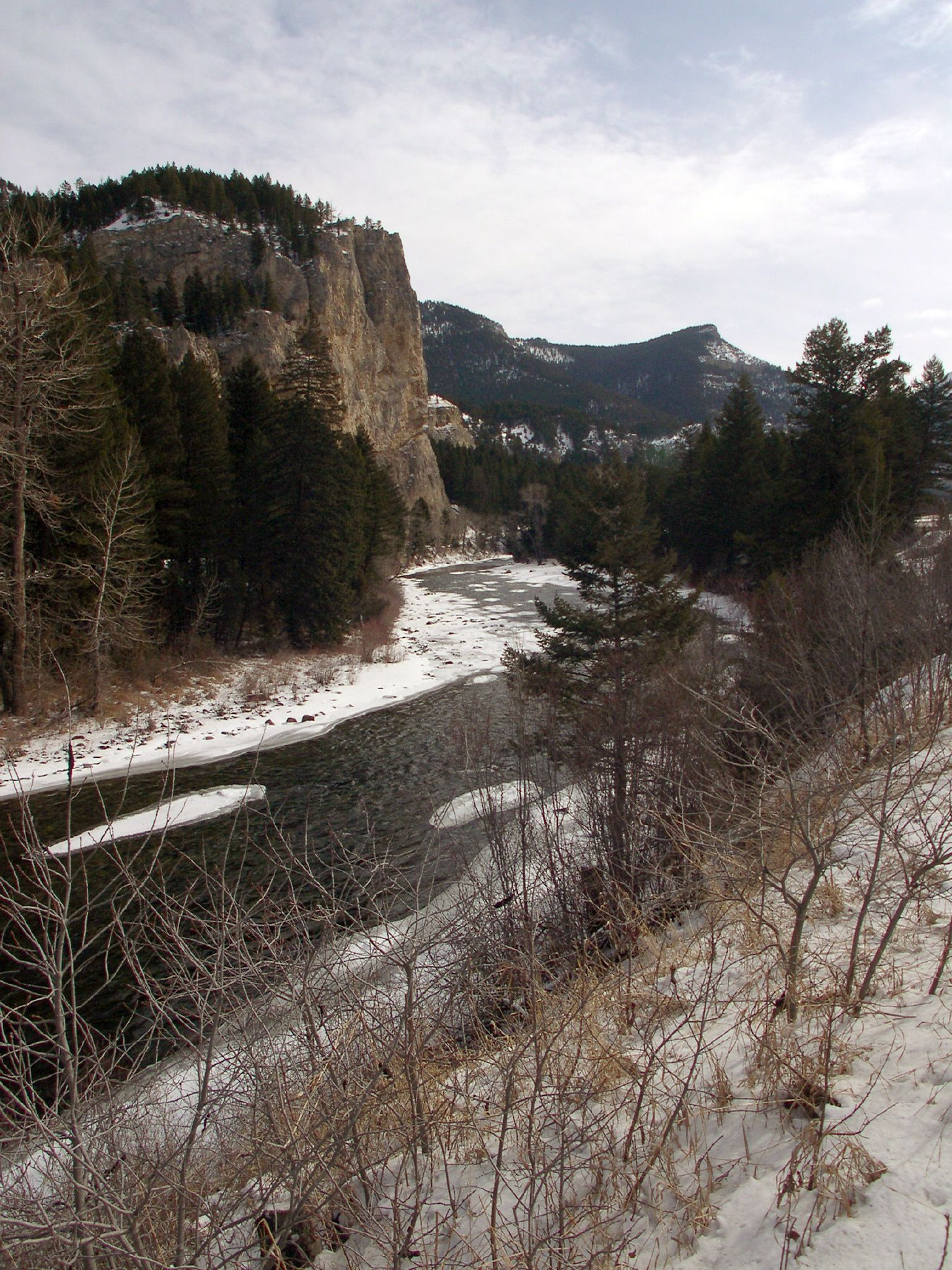
- The Gallatin River during winter

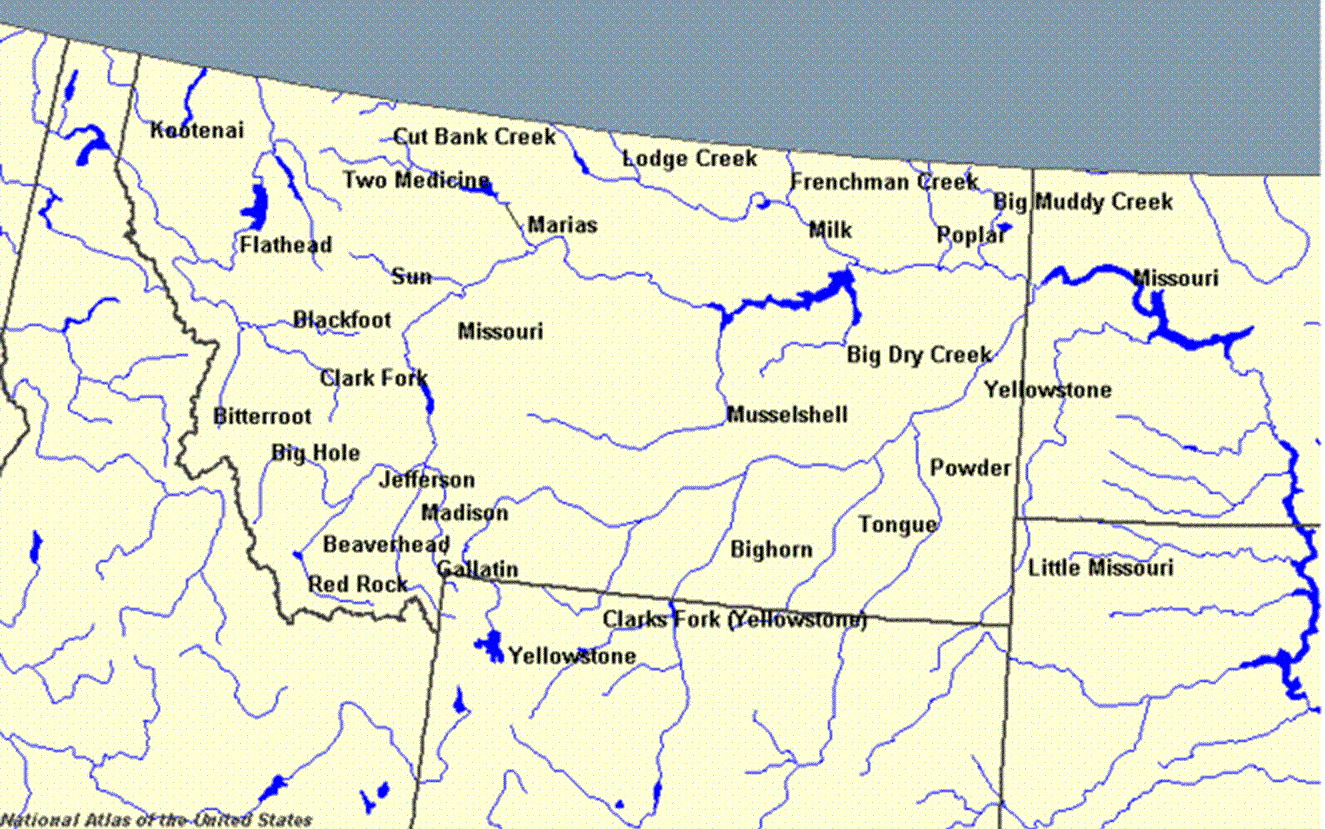
- Montana rivers. The Gallatin is in the southwest corner.

Location
- Country: United States
- State: Wyoming, Montana

Physical characteristics
- Source: Gallatin Range,
  - location: Wyoming, Gallatin Lake,Three Rivers Peak
  - coordinates: 44°51′29″N 110°53′01″W
- Mouth: Missouri River
  - location: Montana
  - coordinates: 45°56′20″N 111°29′33″W
- Length: 120 mi (190 km)
- Discharge
  - location: Logan
  - average: 1,059 cu ft/s (30.0 m^{3}/s)

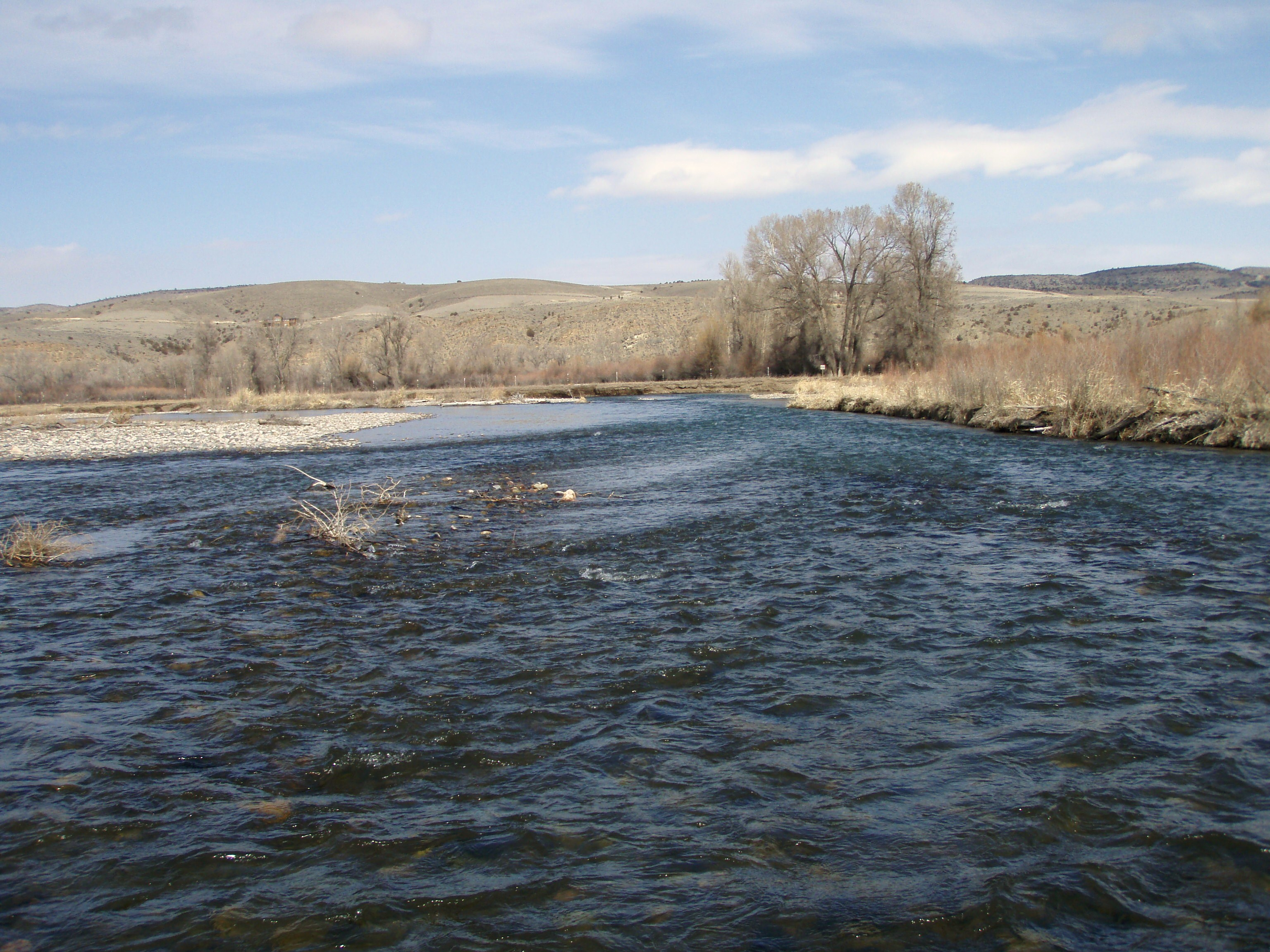
Lower Gallatin River near Manhattan, Montana in late February / early March

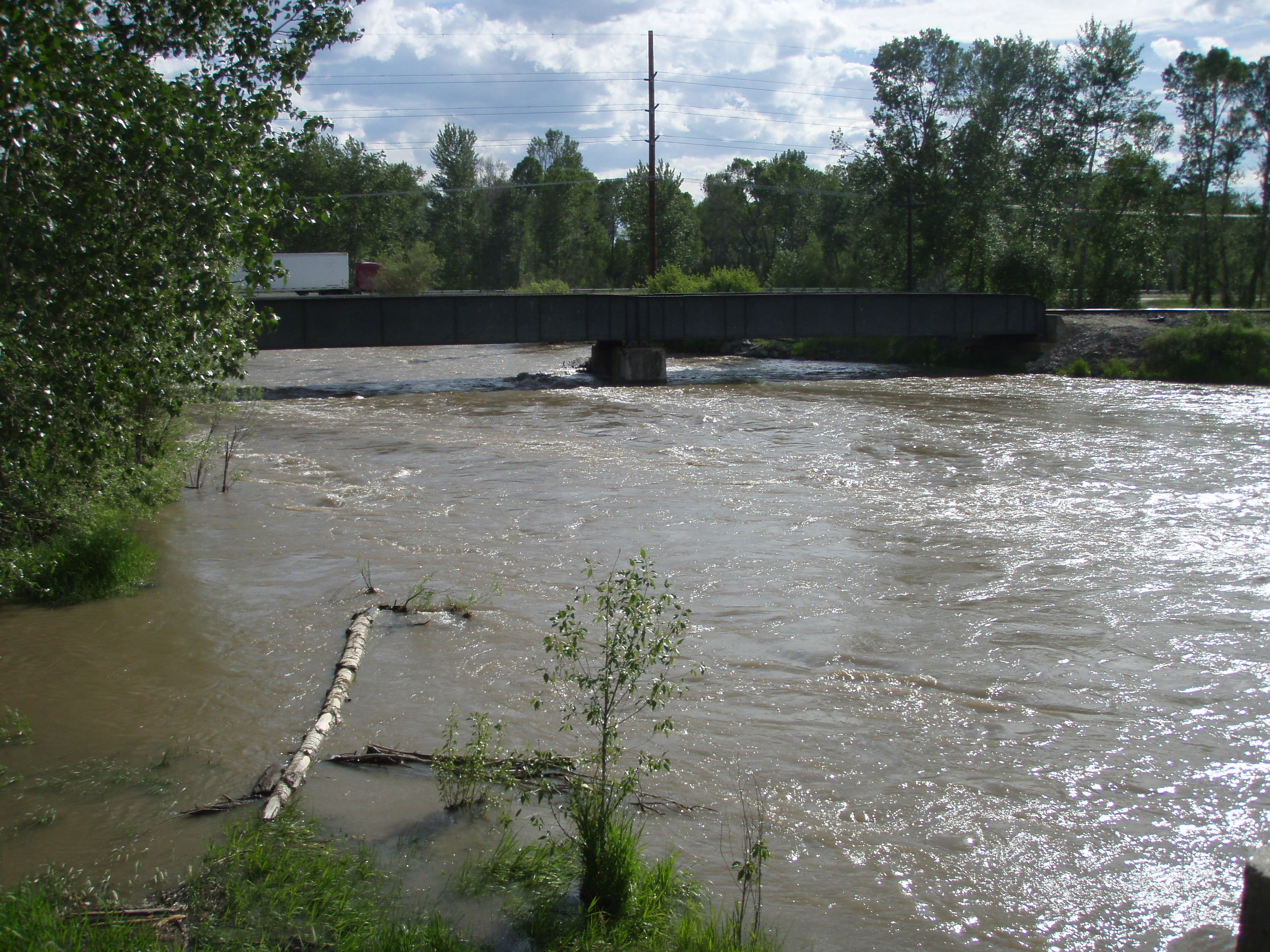
Gallatin River in full spring runoff flood near I-90 June 2008

The Gallatin River is a tributary of the Missouri River, approximately 120 mi (193 km) long, in the U.S. states of Wyoming and Montana. It is one of three rivers, along with the Jefferson and Madison, that converge near Three Forks, Montana, to form the Missouri.

It originates in the northwest corner of Yellowstone National Park in northwestern Wyoming, in the Gallatin Range of the Rocky Mountains. It flows northwest through Gallatin National Forest, past Big Sky, Montana, and joins the Jefferson and Madison approximately 30 mi (48 km) northwest of Bozeman. U.S. Highway 191 follows the river from the Wyoming border to just outside Bozeman.

The river was named in July 1805 by Meriwether Lewis at Three Forks. The eastern fork of the three, it was named for Albert Gallatin, the U.S. Treasury Secretary from 1801–14. The western fork was named for President Thomas Jefferson and the central fork for Secretary of State James Madison.

The Gallatin River is one of the best whitewater runs in the Yellowstone-Teton Area. In June, when the snowmelt is released from the mountains, the river has a class IV section called the "Mad Mile". This section is over a mile long and contains continuous stretches of challenging whitewater. Rafting companies offer trips on this river – on the Mad Mile Section as well as other, less challenging sections.

The Gallatin River winds through high alpine meadows, drops into the rocky Gallatin Canyon, and flows out into the Gallatin Valley. It is a popular fly fishing destination for rainbow trout, brown trout and mountain whitefish. Portions of the river are designated as a Blue Ribbon trout stream while the remainder is designated Red Ribbon by the Montana Fish, Wildlife and Parks Department. The river is closed to fishing from boats from Yellowstone Park to the confluence with the East Gallatin River.

The river is a Class I water from the Taylor Fork to its confluence with the Missouri for the purposes of public recreational access.

== History ==
The history of the canyon mirrors much of the activity during the late 1800 and early 1900s in southwestern Montana. The canyon was first explored by Native American hunters, and later fur-trappers and gold prospectors. There was a significant amount of consideration given to the idea of running the railroad through the canyon to increase travel between Yellowstone National Park and Bozeman, Montana. Logging was conducted in the canyon at the turn of the 20th century, and loggers would ride the logs down river to prevent them from jamming.

Pete Karst moved into the canyon in 1898 to homestead a ranch, and ran everything from an inn for travelers to serving liquor he made on the premise during Prohibition days. His most successful endeavor in the canyon was a bus route he ran in 1924 from Salesville (now Gallatin Gateway) to Yellowstone National Park. "Karst Camp", as it came to be known, was home to the first tow rope ski hill in Montana, and held annual ski jumping competitions.

== List of crossings ==
- trident Rd (source 45°56'14.1"N 111°29'29.5"W)
- Logan Bridge (source 45°53'10.5"N 111°26'31.2"W)
- Nixon Gulch Rd (source 45°53'29.4"N 111°20'12.3"W)
- W Dry Creek Rd (source 45°51'37.2"N 111°17'27.5"W)
- Frontage Rd (source 45°49'30.1"N 111°16'17.5"W)
- Interstate 90 (source 45°49'25.1"N 111°16'19.5"W)
- Amsterdam Rd (source 45°46'21.4"N 111°14'21.1"W)
- W Cameron Bridge Rd (source 45°44'36.5"N 111°13'32.0"W)
- Montana Highway 84 (source 45°40'18.7"N 111°12'32.0"W)
- Axtell Anceny Rd (source 45°37'23.1"N 111°12'18.9"W)
- Gateway South Rd (source 45°35'27.6"N 111°12'48.2"W)
- W Williams Rd (source 45°32'25.6"N 111°14'05.0"W)
- U.S. Route 191 in Montana (source 45°31'19.4"N 111°15'01.1"W)
- Kleinschmidt Rd (source 45°29'29.4"N 111°16'19.2"W)
- Squaw Creek Bridge (source 45°27'29.9"N 111°14'48.0"W)
- U.S. Route 191 in Montana (source 45°24'28.0"N 111°13'34.1"W)
- Karst Stage Loop (source 45°20'37.1"N 111°10'23.1"W)
- Unnamed Road (source 45°17'54.8"N 111°12'13.1"W)
- U.S. Route 191 in Montana (source 45°16'54.6"N 111°13'32.3"W)
- Porcupine Creek Rd (source 45°13'33.2"N 111°14'58.0"W)
- Rainbow Ranch Rd (source 45°11'40.2"N 111°14'08.3"W)
- Walton Mine Rd (source 45°06'57.3"N 111°13'24.9"W)
- Buffalo Horn Creek Rd (source 45°06'06.0"N 111°13'06.7"W)
- U.S. Route 191 in Montana (source 45°03'54.7"N 111°10'56.9"W)
- Black Butte Ranch (source 45°01'45.1"N 111°06'40.3"W)
- U.S. Route 191 in Montana(source 44°58'16.3"N 111°04'43.5"W)
- Fawn Pass Trl (source 44°57'02.7"N 111°03'28.1"W)
- Bighorn Pass Trl (source 44°55'30.9"N 111°02'33.7"W)

== In popular culture ==
Parts of the movie A River Runs Through It were filmed on the Gallatin River.

== See also ==
- Angling in Yellowstone National Park
- Fishes of Yellowstone National Park
- Montana Stream Access Law
- List of Wyoming rivers
- List of rivers of Montana
