= Gallatin Gateway, Montana =

- Census-designated place
- Location within Montana Location within the United States
- Coordinates: 45°35′23″N 111°11′43″W
- Country: United States
- State: Montana
- County: Gallatin

Area
  - Total: 5.95 sq mi (15.40 km^{2})
  - Land: 5.85 sq mi (15.15 km^{2})
  - Water: 0.097 sq mi (0.25 km^{2})
- Elevation: 4,974 ft (1,516 m)

Population (2020)
  - Total: 967
  - Density: 165.3/sq mi (63.84/km^{2})
- Time zone: UTC-7 (Mountain (MST))
  - Summer (DST): UTC-6 (MDT)
- ZIP code: 59730
- Area code: 406
- FIPS code: 30-29875
- GNIS feature ID: 2583809

Gallatin Gateway is a census-designated place (CDP) in Gallatin County, Montana, United States. As of the 2020 census, Gallatin Gateway had a population of 967. Elevation is 4,953 ft (1,510 m).

== Geography ==
The community is located along U.S. Route 191 in the valley of the Gallatin River, a north-flowing tributary of the Missouri River. US 191 leads north, then east 13 miles (21 km) to Bozeman and south 28 miles (45 km) to Big Sky. According to the U.S. Census Bureau, the CDP has a total area of 5.9 square miles (15.4 km^{2}), of which 5.8 square miles (15.1 km^{2}) is land and 0.1 square miles (0.3 km^{2}), or 1.83%, is water.

== History ==
Salesville was one of the pioneer towns, named for Z. Sales, who secured a saw mill started by J. J. Tomlinson, continuing the business on the West Gallatin river several years. With his family, he established the town on his property, the name of the town being changed in 1927 to Gallatin Gateway, by The Milwaukee Road, when the town became the terminus of the branch line from Three Forks, carrying passengers for the trip through Yellowstone National Park by way of Gallatin Canyon.

The passenger depot that was built at that time was established in the commodious Gallatin Gateway Inn built by the railroad. A good brick school house, some substantial business blocks and comfortable homes are found there. Opening June 17, 1927, The Gallatin Gateway Inn was touted as one of the most luxurious and beautiful hotels of the day. In 1980 the Inn received Historic Landmark designation after an extensive restoration effort (the Milwaukee Road left the Northwestern U.S. that year).

== Demographics ==
Historical population
Census	Pop.	Note	%±
2020	967		—
U.S. Decennial Census

== Education ==
Most of it is in Gallatin Gateway Elementary School District while a part of it is in Bozeman Elementary School District. All of it is in Bozeman High School District. The Bozeman elementary and high school districts are both a part of Bozeman Public Schools.
