= Norris, Montana =

- Census-designated place
- Location within Montana Location within the United States
- Coordinates: 45°34′23″N 111°41′29″W
- Country: United States
- State: Montana
- County: Madison

Area
  - Total: 0.34 sq mi (0.87 km^{2})
  - Land: 0.34 sq mi (0.87 km^{2})
  - Water: 0 sq mi (0.00 km^{2})
- Elevation: 4,866 ft (1,483 m)

Population (2020)
  - Total: 46
  - Density: 137.3/sq mi (53.03/km^{2})
- ZIP Code: 59745
- FIPS code: 30-54475
- GNIS feature ID: 2806646

Norris is an unincorporated community and census-designated place in northeastern Madison County, Montana, United States, at the intersection of U.S. Route 287 and Montana Highway 84. As of the 2020 census, the first where it was listed as a CDP, the population was 46.

== History ==
Several mining districts were located in the area in the 1860s, though their success was generally brief. A now-abandoned branch line of the former Northern Pacific Railway once terminated at Norris.

== Geography ==
Norris is in northeastern Madison County, 16 miles (26 km) north of Ennis and 31 miles (50 km) south of Three Forks via US-287, and 36 miles (58 km) west of Bozeman via MT-84. The location is a hilly, relatively arid area used for farming and ranching; the Tobacco Root Mountains form a visual backdrop to the west.

Norris Hot Springs is 0.4 miles (0.6 km) east of the town. The Red Bluff Research Ranch—an agricultural experiment station operated by Montana State University - Bozeman is at Red Bluff, 2.5 miles (4.0 km) east on Highway 84.

According to the U.S. Census Bureau, the Norris CDP has an area of 0.34 square miles (0.88 km^{2}), all of it recorded as land. Hot Springs Creek flows through the community, running east to join the Madison River east of Red Bluff.

== Demographics ==
Historical population
Census	Pop.	Note	%±
2020	46		—
U.S. Decennial Census

== Education ==
The CDP is in the Harrison K-12 Schools school district.
