= Bozeman Yellowstone International Airport =

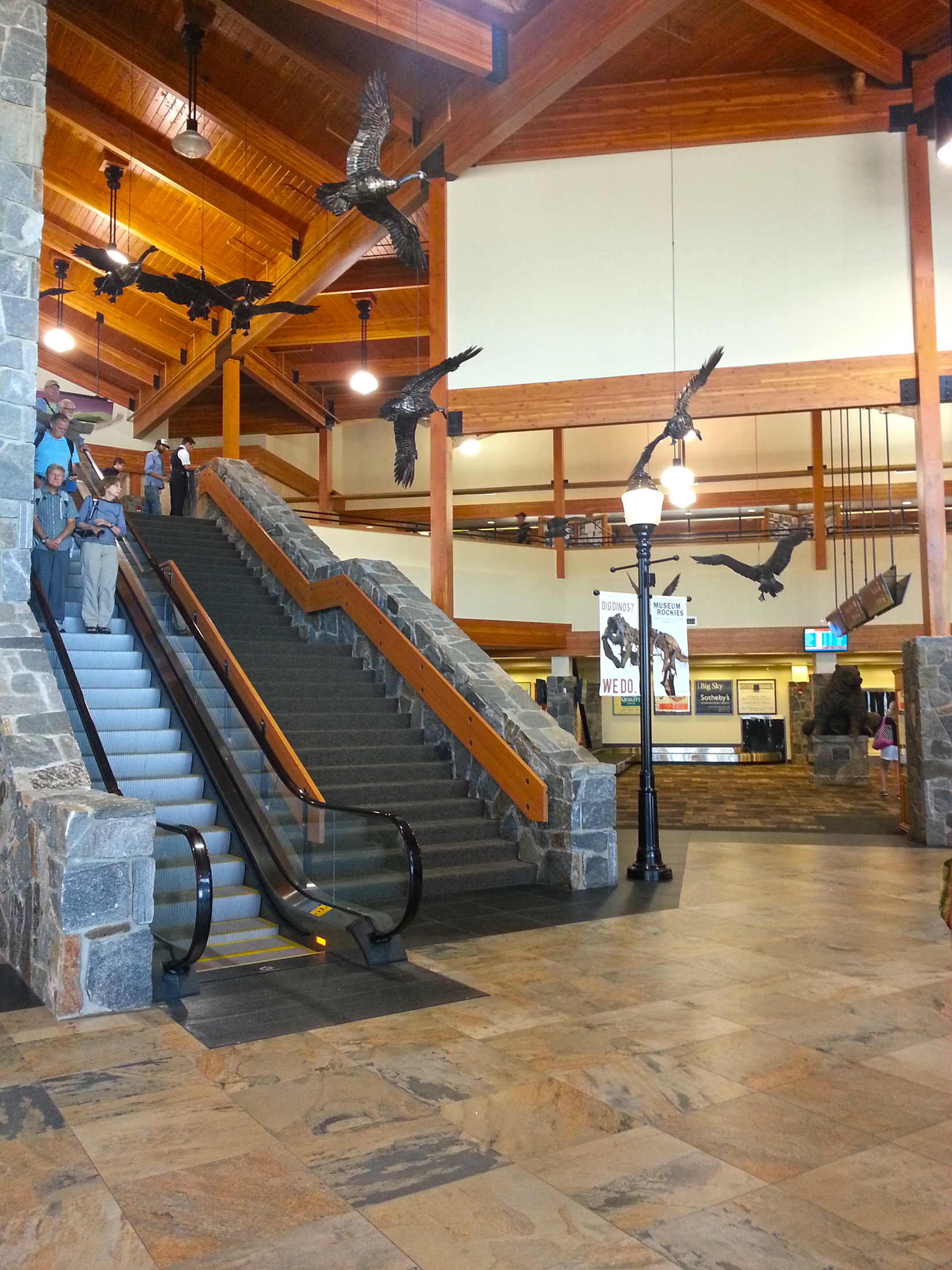
- IATA: BZN; ICAO: KBZN; FAA LID: BZN

Summary
- Airport type: Public
- Owner: Gallatin Airport Authority
- Serves: Bozeman, Montana
- Location: Belgrade, Montana
- Time zone: Mountain (UTC−7)
  - Summer (DST): (UTC−6)
- Elevation AMSL: 4,473 ft (1,363 m)
- Coordinates: 45°46′37″N 111°09′07″W
- Website: bozemanairport.com

Maps
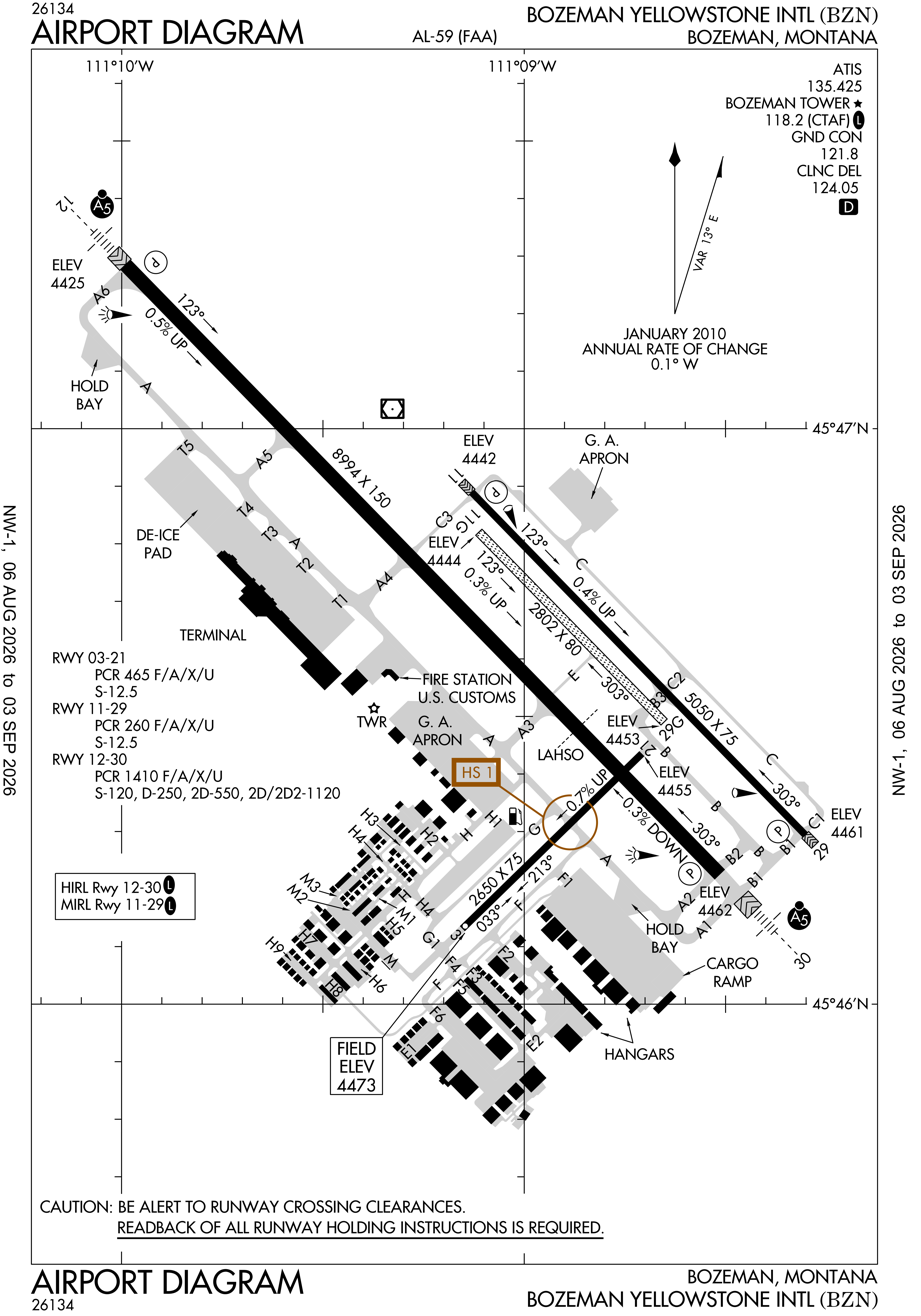
- FAA airport diagram
- Interactive map of Bozeman Yellowstone International Airport

Runways
| Direction | Length | | Surface |
| Direction | ft | m | Surface |
|---|---|---|---|
| 12/30 | 8,994 | 2,741 | Asphalt |
| 3/21 | 2,650 | 808 | Asphalt |
| 11/29 | 5,050 | 1,539 | Asphalt |
| 11G/29G | 2,802 | 854 | Grass |

Statistics (2025)
- Aircraft operations: 118,030
- Total passengers: 2,809,419 ▲6.3%
- Sources: FAA and airport website

Bozeman Yellowstone International Airport (IATA: BZN, ICAO: KBZN, FAA LID: BZN) (Gallatin Field) is an airport located in unincorporated Gallatin County, Montana, United States, adjacent to Belgrade, and eight miles (13 km; 7 nmi) northwest of Bozeman. Owned by the Gallatin Airport Authority, it has been Montana's busiest airport since 2013.

The National Plan of Integrated Airport Systems for 2011–2015 categorized it as a primary commercial service facility (more than 10,000 enplanements per year). Federal Aviation Administration records show that the airport had 442,788 passenger boardings (enplanements) in calendar year 2013, 434,038 in 2012 and 397,870 in 2011.

== History ==
Originally named Gallatin Field after Gallatin County, it first opened in 1941. Its first official passenger landed in 1942.

A number of improvements were made in the late 1960s to accommodate jet service, including extending the main runway to 9,000 feet.

In 2011, the Gallatin Airport Authority Airport Board changed the airport's name to Bozeman Yellowstone International Airport at Gallatin Field, to associate it with Yellowstone National Park. That same year a terminal expansion designed by Prugh & Lenon Architects opened, adding three gates and more retail concessions.

International flights have been allowed since 2012, after a U.S. Customs and Border Protection facility opened on July 1. The project was funded in cooperation with Signature Flight Support and the Yellowstone Club. In 2013, BZN surpassed Billings Logan as the busiest airport in Montana for passenger service with 879,221 passengers from June 2012 to May 2013.

The airport had an expansion of service in 2020 and 2025 to a record 31 nonstop destinations as airlines entered the market or added new routes to serve increased leisure demand. Allegiant Air added nonstop service from three cities; Alaska Airlines added two new routes; startup airline Avelo Airlines began service to one destination; and Southwest Airlines, the largest airline without service to any city in Montana, entered Montana for the first time with two destinations from Bozeman, later adding several more. Several of the markets added had never been commercially served from Bozeman before, including Washington, D.C. (Dulles) and Nashville.

In April 2023, Summit Aviation began construction on a new facility to support its services for Gallatin College as well as its own flight training, charter service, and aircraft management services.

In 2024, the airport announced a $180-million dollar infrastructure upgrade and expansion. This expansion, the largest ever in Montana history, will include the addition of three new baggage carousels, a second security checkpoint, and the capability to add on three more gates. The expansion is expected to be completed within the next 4.5 years.

== Facilities ==
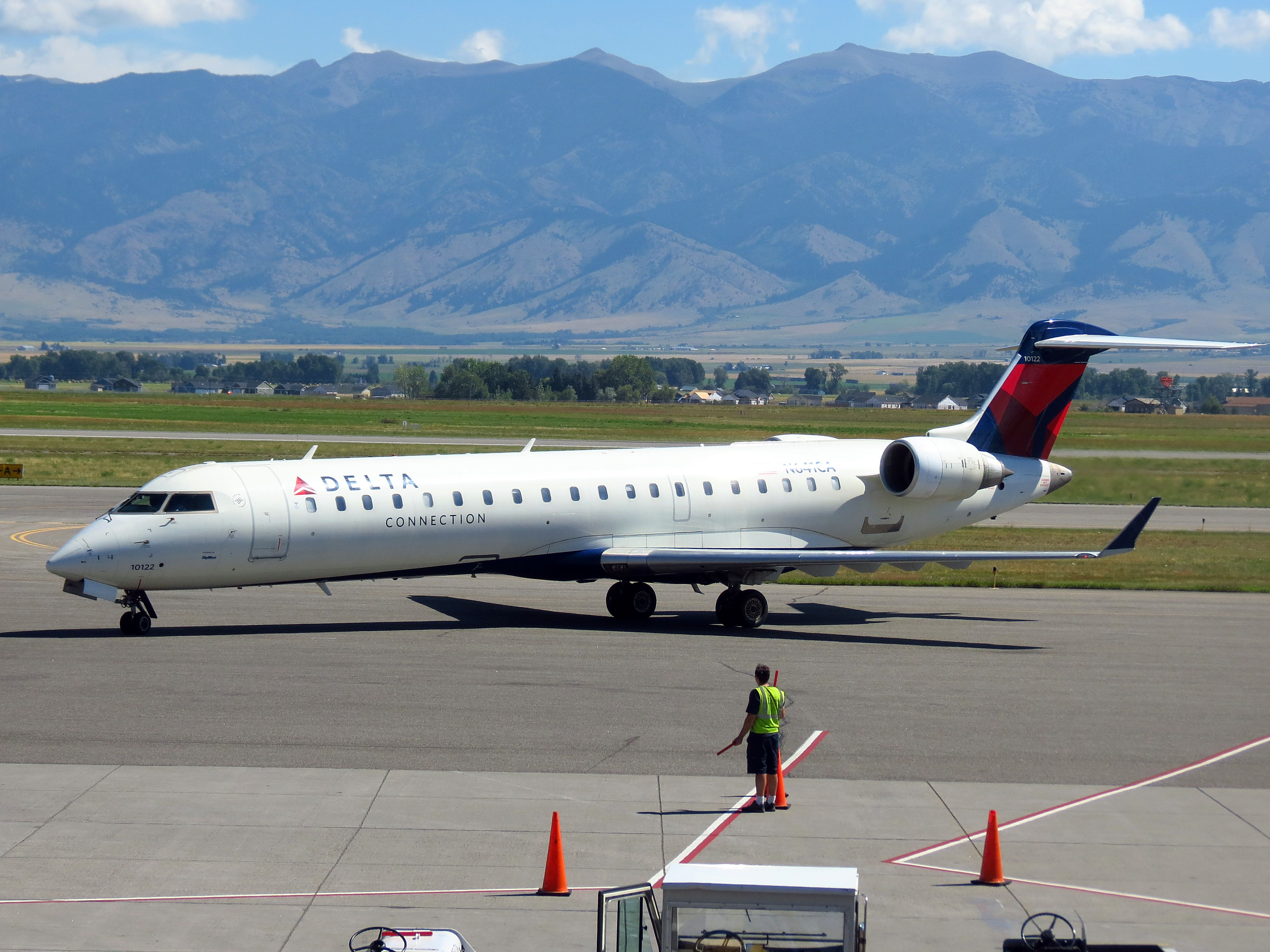
A Delta Connection CRJ700 at Bozeman Yellowstone International Airport, with the Bridger Mountains in the background

The airport covers 2,481 acres (10.04 km^{2}) at an elevation of 4,473 feet (1,363 m) above sea level. It has four runways: 12/30 is 8,994 by 150 feet (2,741 by 46 m) asphalt; 3/21 is 2,650 by 75 feet (808 by 23 m) asphalt; 11/29 is 5,050 by 75 feet (1,539 by 23 m) asphalt; and 11G/29G is 2,802 by 80 feet (854 by 24 m) turf.

== Airlines and destinations ==
=== Passenger ===
| Airlines | Destinations |
|---|---|
| Alaska Airlines | Portland (OR), Seattle/Tacoma; Seasonal: Boise, San Diego, San Francisco |
| Allegiant Air | Las Vegas, Phoenix/Mesa; Seasonal: Nashville |
| American Airlines | Dallas/Fort Worth; Seasonal: Charlotte, Chicago–O'Hare, New York–JFK (begins June 18, 2027) |
| American Eagle | Seasonal: Chicago–O'Hare, Los Angeles, Phoenix–Sky Harbor |
| Delta Air Lines | Atlanta, Minneapolis/St. Paul, Salt Lake City; Seasonal: Boston, New York–JFK, New York–LaGuardia |
| Delta Connection | Salt Lake City, Seattle/Tacoma; Seasonal: Austin, Los Angeles |
| JetBlue | Seasonal: Boston, New York–JFK |
| Southwest Airlines | Denver, Las Vegas; Seasonal: Chicago–Midway, Dallas–Love, Long Beach, Nashville, San Diego |
| United Airlines | Chicago–O'Hare, Denver, Los Angeles, San Francisco; Seasonal: Houston–Intercontinental, Newark, Washington–Dulles |
| United Express | Denver; Seasonal: Chicago–O'Hare, Los Angeles |

Destinations map
Destinations from Bozeman Yellowstone International Airport
Red = Year-round destination
Green = Seasonal destination
Blue = Future destination

=== Cargo ===
- Empire Air (operating on behalf of FedEx Feeder and United States Postal Service)
- Alpine Air Express (operating on behalf of UPS Airlines and United States Postal Service)

== Statistics ==
=== Annual traffic ===
BZN Airport annual traffic, 2004–present
| Year | Passengers | Operations | Year | Passengers | Operations | Year | Passengers | Operations |
|---|---|---|---|---|---|---|---|---|
| 2004 | 619,543 | 66,616 | 2014 | 966,964 | 80,722 | 2024 | 2,642,707 | 120,578 |
| 2005 | 672,482 | 71,556 | 2015 | 1,021,155 | 80,559 | 2025 | 2,809,419 | 118,030 |
| 2006 | 633,762 | 82,937 | 2016 | 1,107,168 | 76,902 | 2026 | | |
| 2007 | 670,874 | 80,606 | 2017 | 1,199,537 | 76,235 | 2027 | | |
| 2008 | 702,495 | 76,762 | 2018 | 1,342,290 | 90,502 | 2028 | | |
| 2009 | 683,277 | 68,913 | 2019 | 1,573,860 | 97,867 | 2029 | | |
| 2010 | 728,038 | 72,447 | 2020 | 889,775 | 104,091 | 2030 | | |
| 2011 | 796,110 | 73,749 | 2021 | 1,940,191 | 116,055 | 2031 | | |
| 2012 | 867,117 | 81,482 | 2022 | 2,264,424 | 111,062 | 2032 | | |
| 2013 | 884,660 | 74,952 | 2023 | 2,464,325 | 129,775 | 2033 | | |

=== Top destinations ===
Busiest domestic routes from BZN (December 2024 – November 2025)
| Rank | City | Passengers | Carriers |
|---|---|---|---|
| 1 | Denver, Colorado | 335,540 | Southwest, United |
| 2 | Chicago-O'Hare, Illinois | 143,050 | American, United |
| 3 | Seattle/Tacoma, Washington | 133,370 | Alaska, Delta |
| 4 | Minneapolis/St. Paul, Minnesota | 131,240 | Delta, Sun Country |
| 5 | Salt Lake City, Utah | 103,860 | Delta |
| 6 | Dallas/Fort Worth, Texas | 102,290 | American |
| 7 | Las Vegas, Nevada | 74,020 | Allegiant, Southwest |
| 8 | Atlanta, Georgia | 67,400 | Delta |
| 9 | Newark, New Jersey | 48,680 | United |
| 10 | Los Angeles, California | 43,490 | Delta, United |

=== Airline market share ===
Largest airlines at BZN (December 2024 – November 2025)
| Rank | Airline | Passengers | Share |
|---|---|---|---|
| 1 | United Airlines | 696,000 | 24.92% |
| 2 | Delta Air Lines | 554,000 | 19.82% |
| 3 | Southwest Airlines | 491,000 | 17.57% |
| 4 | American Airlines | 329,000 | 11.80% |
| 5 | SkyWest Airlines | 246,000 | 8.80% |
| | Other | 477,000 | 17.08% |

== See also ==
- List of airports in Montana
