= Cedeño =

Cedeño may refer to:

== Places ==
- Cedeño Municipality, Bolívar, one of the eleven municipalities of the state of Bolívar, Venezuela
- Cedeño Municipality, Monagas, one of the thirteen municipalities of the state of Monagas, Venezuela
- Cedeño, Honduras, a municipality near the mouth of the Choluteca River

== People ==
- Andújar Cedeño (1969–2000), Dominican baseball player
- César Cedeño (born 1951), Dominican baseball player
- Dario Cedeño (born 1991), Ecuadorian football defender
- David Vélez Cedeño (born 1995), Ecuadorian footballer
- Domingo Cedeño (born 1968), Dominican baseball player
- Eligio Cedeño (born 1964), Venezuelan banker
- Elvis Cedeño (born 1964), Venezuelan athlete
- Guayo Cedeño (born 1974), Honduran musician and producer
- Ileana Espinel Cedeño (1933–2001), Ecuadorian journalist, poet and writer
- Juan Cedeño (born 1983), Dominican baseball player
- Juan Manuel Cedeño (1914–1997), Panamanian painter
- Jean Cedeño (born 1985), Panamanian footballer
- José Cedeño (disambiguation)
  - José Antonio Cedeño (born 1939), self-taught Cuban artist specializing in sculpture
  - José Dimas Cedeño Delgado (born 1933), Panamanian Roman Catholic archbishop
- Leandro Cedeño (born 1998), Venezuelan baseball player
- Lumidee Cedeño (born 1984), American singer-songwriter and rapper
- Matt Cedeño (born 1974), American television actor and former male fashion model
- Melwin Cedeño (born 1964), Puerto Rican actor, comedian, musician, host, and singer
- Rafael Cedeño Hernández (fl. 2000s–2020s), imprisoned Mexican drug trafficker
- Raquel Rodríguez Cedeño (born 1993), Costa Rican international soccer player
- Roger Cedeño (born 1974), Venezuelan baseball player
- Ronny Cedeño (born 1983), Venezuelan baseball player
- Rubén Cedeño (born 1952), Venezuelan musician, composer, painter, writer and speaker on metaphysical subjects
- Xavier Cedeño (born 1986), Puerto Rican baseball player
- Margarita Cedeño (born 1965), Vice-President of the Dominican Republic

== See also ==
- Frank Cedeno (born 1958), Filipino former professional boxer
- Yosdenis Cedeno (born 1985), Cuban-American mixed martial artist
- Cedano, a surname
