= Governors of provinces of Cuba =

Per the 2019 Constitution of Cuba, each province of Cuba is composed by a governor and a provincial council. Governors are proposed by the president of Cuba and elected by the delegates of the Municipal Assembly of People's Power, for a term of five years. They are the highest executive power in each province. In order to serve as governor, they must have sole citizenship of Cuba, at least 30 years old, reside in the province which they are representing, and have "full enjoyment of their civil and political rights."

After being elected, governors and vice-governors have to take office in under 21 days.

== Duties of the Governors ==
Per the 2019 Constitution of Cuba, Article 179, the governor of each province has to correspond with these duties.

"

1. To comply with, and ensure compliance with, the Constitution and the laws;
2. To convene and preside over the meetings of the Provincial Council;
3. To direct, coordinate, and monitor the labor of the organizing structures of the Provincial Administration and, within the area of his or her competence, to issue regulatory provisions and adopt the corresponding decisions;
4. To call for and to monitor the implementation of the economic development plan as well as the implementation of the province's budget, in accordance with the policy agreed to by the competent national organs;
5. To call for and to monitor the implementation of the territorial and urban development and organization plans;
6. To designate and to substitute the leaders and functionaries of the provincial administration, and to submit for the ratification of the Provincial Council those cases that are prescribed by the law;
7. To present to the Council of Ministers, with prior agreement of the Provincial Council, the policy proposals that contribute to the province's holistic development;
8. To inform the Council of Ministers, with prior agreement of the Provincial Council, of those decisions of the superior organs that affect the interests of the community or are considered to have overstepped the authority of those that adopted them;
9. To suspend the agreements and orders of the councils of the Municipal Administration that do not conform with the Constitution, the laws, decrees with the force of law, presidential decrees, and other acts of the organs of the State, or when they affect the interests of other localities or the general interests of the country, informing the respective Municipal Assembly of People's Power during the first session held after said suspension occurs;
10. To revoke or to modify the decrees that are adopted by the administrative provincial authorities that answer to it that contravene the Constitution, the laws, and other orders that are in force, or those that affect the interests of other communities or the general interests of the country;
11. To create temporary commissions or working groups;
12. To arrange for the publication of the agreements of the Provincial Council that are of a general interest and to monitor their implementation, and
13. The other duties that the Constitution or the laws assign to it. "

== List of current governors ==
Province	Image	Governor	Party
Artemisa		Ricardo Concepción Rodríguez	PCC
Camagüey		Jorge Enrique Sutil Sarabia	PCC
Ciego de Ávila		Alfre Menéndez Pérez	PCC
Cienfuegos		Yolexis Rodríguez Armada	PCC
Granma		Yanetsy Terry Gutiérrez	PCC
Guantánamo		Alis Azahares Torreblanca	PCC
Holguín		Manuel Francisco Hernández Aguilera	PCC
La Habana		Yanet Hernández Pérez	PCC
Las Tunas		Yelenis Tornet Menéndez	PCC
Matanzas		Marieta Poey Zamora	PCC
Mayabeque		Manuel Aguiar Lamas	PCC
Pinar del Río		Eumelín González Sánchez	PCC
Sancti Spíritus		Alexis Lorente Jiménez	PCC
Santiago de Cuba		Manuel Falcón Hernández	PCC
Villa Clara		Milaxy Yanet Sánchez Armas	PCC

== List of current vice-governors ==
Province	Image	Governor	Party
Artemisa		Yamina Duarte Duarte	PCC
Camagüey		Yennis León Mayedo	PCC
Ciego de Ávila		Hiorvanys Espinosa Pérez	PCC
Cienfuegos		Rolando José Rajadel Alzuri	PCC
Granma		José Luis Vega Pérez	PCC
Guantánamo		Carlos Raúl Martínez Turro	PCC
Holguín		Yunia Pérez Hernández	PCC
La Habana		Jesús Otamendiz Campos	PCC
Las Tunas		Juana Yamilka Viñals Suárez	PCC
Matanzas		Lázaro Vicente Suárez Navarro	PCC
Mayabeque		María Dailis Guerra Moré	PCC
Pinar del Río		Niurka Rodríguez	PCC
Sancti Spíritus		Frank Osbel Cañizares Rodríguez	PCC
Santiago de Cuba		Waldis González Peinado	PCC
Villa Clara		Noel Cecilio Chinea Pérez	PCC

== Governor elections ==
=== 2020 elections ===
The first governor and vice-governor elections took place 18 January 2020, and the elected officials took office 8 February 2020. All of the provinces were involved in the 2020 elections.

Election results were:

Province	Governor	Percentage of vote	Party
Artemisa	Ricardo Concepción Rodríguez	99.10	PCC
Camagüey	Yoseily Góngora López	98.24	PCC
Ciego de Ávila	Tomás Alexis Martín Venegas	99.63	PCC
Cienfuegos	Alexandre Corona Quintero	99.03	PCC
Granma	Francisco Alexis Escribano Cruz	95.69	PCC
Guantánamo	Emilio Matos Mosqueda	99.83	PCC
Holguín	Julio César Estupiñán Rodríguez	97.74	PCC
La Habana	Reinaldo García Zapata	98.24	PCC
Las Tunas	Jaime Ernesto Chiang Vega	99.85	PCC
Matanzas	Mario Felipe Sabines Lorenzo	98.00	PCC
Mayabeque	Tamara Valido Benítez	94.73	PCC
Pinar del Río	Rubén Ramos Moreno	99.44	PCC
Sancti Spíritus	Teresita Romero Rodríguez	95.00	PCC
Santiago de Cuba	Beatriz Johnson Urrutia	99.58	PCC
Villa Clara	Alberto López Díaz	98.78	PCC

Province	Vice-Governor	Percentage of vote	Party
Artemisa	Yamina Duarte Duarte	97.59	PCC
Camagüey	Carmen María Hernández Requejo	97.65	PCC
Ciego de Ávila	Ania Rosa Francisco Malde	97.25	PCC
Cienfuegos	Yolexis Rodríguez Armada	97.86	PCC
Granma	Yanetsy Terry Gutiérrez	99.68	PCC
Guantánamo	Alis Azahares Torreblanca	98.81	PCC
Holguín	Yunia Pérez Hernández	95.81	PCC
La Habana	Yanet Hernández Pérez	94.95	PCC
Las Tunas	Yelenys Tornet Menéndez	97.71	PCC
Matanzas	Marieta Caridad Poey Zamora	96.94	PCC
Mayabeque	Manuel Aguiar Lamas	93.67	PCC
Pinar del Río	Niurka Rodríguez Hernández	96.61	PCC
Sancti Spíritus	Frank Osbel Cañizares Rodríguez	97.81	PCC
Santiago de Cuba	Manuel Falcón Hernández	95.76	PCC
Villa Clara	Milaxy Yanet Sánchez Armas	98.47	PCC

=== 2023 elections ===
The second governor and vice-governor elections took place 28 May 2023, and the inauguration of the officials would take place 4 June 2023. All of the provinces were involved in the 2023 elections.

Election results were:

Province	Governor	Percentage of vote	Party
Artemisa	Ricardo Concepción Rodríguez	95.56	PCC
Camagüey	Jorge Enrique Sutil Sarabia	99.28	PCC
Ciego de Ávila	Alfre Menéndez Pérez	99.81	PCC
Cienfuegos	Alexandre Corona Quintero	96.73	PCC
Granma	Yanetsy Terry Gutiérrez	99.58	PCC
Guantánamo	Alis Azahares Torreblanca	96.09	PCC
Holguín	Manuel Francisco Hernández	98.94	PCC
La Habana	Yanet Hernández Pérez	97.16	PCC
Las Tunas	Jaime Ernesto Chiang Vega	92.16	PCC
Matanzas	Mario Felipe Sabines Lorenzo	95.57	PCC
Mayabeque	Manuel Aguiar Lamas	97.48	PCC
Pinar del Río	Eumelín González Sánchez	98.37	PCC
Sancti Spíritus	Alexis Lorente Jiménez	97.91	PCC
Santiago de Cuba	Beatriz Johnson Urrutia	94.25	PCC
Villa Clara	Alberto López Díaz	95.60	PCC

Province	Vice-Governor	Percentage of vote	Party
Artemisa	Yamina Duarte Duarte	97.14	PCC
Camagüey	Yennis León Mayedo	97.23	PCC
Ciego de Ávila	Hiorvanys Espinosa Pérez	98.11	PCC
Cienfuegos	Yolexis Rodríguez Armada	97.55	PCC
Granma	Teresa Luisa Pérez Trinchet	97.15	PCC
Guantánamo	Carlos Raúl Martínez Turro	95.20	PCC
Holguín	Yunia Pérez Hernández	94.79	PCC
La Habana	Jesús Otamendiz Campos	93.35	PCC
Las Tunas	Ernesto Luis Cruz Reyes	96.71	PCC
Matanzas	Marieta Caridad Poey Zamora	96.26	PCC
Mayabeque	María Dailis Guerra Moré	97.90	PCC
Pinar del Río	Niurka Rodríguez Hernández	96.74	PCC
Sancti Spíritus	Frank Osbel Cañizares Rodríguez	96.94	PCC
Santiago de Cuba	Manuel Falcón Hernández	96.09	PCC
Villa Clara	Milaxy Yanet Sánchez Armas	99.14	PCC

=== 2024 elections ===
The 2024 governor elections mostly took place on 4 May, 2024, and were inaugurated 21 May 2024, while the elections of Las Tunas Province, took place on 8 December 2024. Only the provinces of Cienfuegos, Matanzas, Santiago de Cuba, and Villa Clara were involved in this serie of elections.

Election results were:

Province	Governor	Percentage of vote	Party	Date
Cienfuegos	Yolexis Rodríguez Armada	92.42	PCC	4 May 2024
Las Tunas	Yelenis Tornet Menéndez	98.58	PCC	8 December 2024
Matanzas	Marieta Poey Zamora	95.78	PCC	4 May 2024
Santiago de Cuba	Manuel Falcón Hernández	95.09	PCC	4 May 2024
Villa Clara	Milaxy Yanet Sánchez Armas	98.10	PCC	4 May 2024

Province	Vice-Governor	Percentage of vote	Party	
Cienfuegos	Rolando José Rajadel Alzuri	94.95	PCC	4 May 2024
Las Tunas	Juana Yamilka Viñals Suárez	97.48	PCC	8 December 2024
Matanzas	Lázaro Vicente Suárez Navarro	93.88	PCC	4 May 2024
Santiago de Cuba	Waldis González Peinado	96.04	PCC	4 May 2024
Villa Clara	Noel Cecilio Chinea Pérez	95.14	PCC	4 May 2024
