= Chone, Ecuador =

City in Manabí, Ecuador

Chone
- City
- San Cayetano de Chone
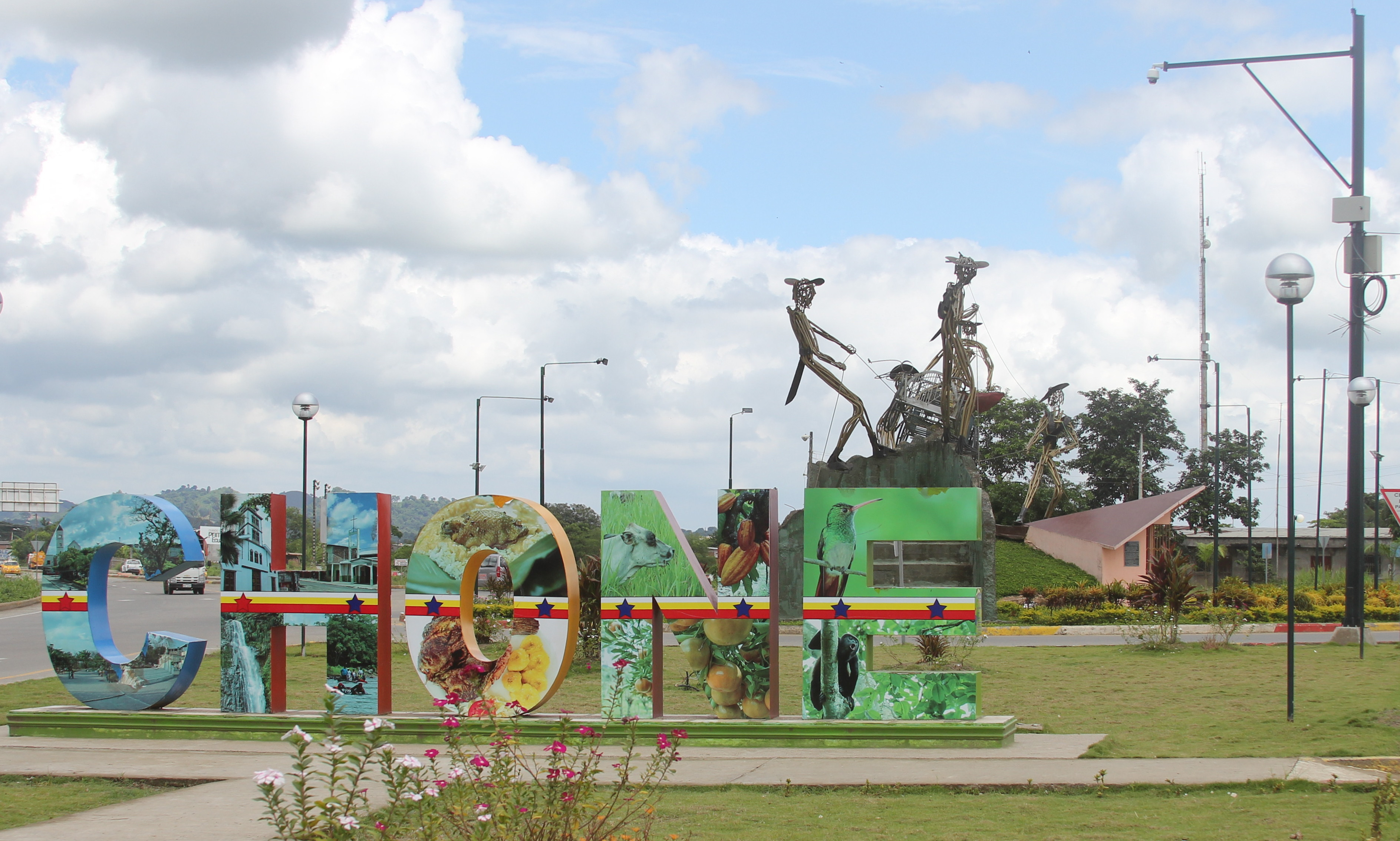

- Flag

- Location within Ecuador
- Coordinates: 0°41′S 80°06′W
- Country: Ecuador
- Province: Manabí
- Canton: Chone Canton

Area
  - City: 10.87 km^{2} (4.20 sq mi)

Population (2022 census)
  - City: 54,629
  - Density: 5,026/km^{2} (13,020/sq mi)
- Time zone: UTC-5 (ECT)

Chone (Spanish pronunciation: [ˈtʃone], English: /ˈtʃoʊˌneɪ/) is a city in the province of Manabí in Ecuador. It is located in Ecuador's low-lying coastal region and plays an important role as a transportation hub. It is about seven hours by bus from the capital city of Quito. In the city are the main institutions and organizations of the canton of Chone.

== History ==
Chone was founded on 7 August 1735 by a friar from Portoviejo, José Antonion Cedeño. Cedeño named the town Villa de San Cayetano de Chone. Chone grew rapidly as a center for agriculture and transportation.

== Geography ==
Due to the city's location, it is prone to damaging floods during the coast's rainy season. During this time, streets often become inundated with rain water. Many of the city's residents have taken to constructing homes on bamboo stilts to keep out the water.

The city lies on the banks of the Río Chone. Further west, the river becomes an estuary, opening to the coastal cities of Bahía de Caráquez and San Vicente.

The closest beaches are about two hours away in different directions. They include Crucita, San Vicente and San Clemente. The city of Manta has a popular beach and was home to an American military base in charge of helping battle the drug trade.

== Culture ==
A popular fish in Chone is called chame, known in English as the Pacific fat sleeper (Dormitator latifrons). It is fried and served with rice, platano (plantain) and a small salad.

== Notable people ==
- Dario Cedeño (born 1991), football player
- Marlon Vera (born 1992), mixed martial artist
- Lavinia Valbonesi (born 1998), First Lady of Ecuador

== Climate ==
Climate data for Chone, elevation 69 m (226 ft), (1971–2000)
Month	Jan	Feb	Mar	Apr	May	Jun	Jul	Aug	Sep	Oct	Nov	Dec	Year
Mean daily maximum °C (°F)	31.4 (88.5)	31.6 (88.9)	31.3 (88.3)	32.6 (90.7)	31.5 (88.7)	29.4 (84.9)	29.3 (84.7)	30.3 (86.5)	30.6 (87.1)	30.4 (86.7)	30.9 (87.6)	31.4 (88.5)	30.9 (87.6)
Mean daily minimum °C (°F)	21.6 (70.9)	21.9 (71.4)	21.9 (71.4)	21.8 (71.2)	21.8 (71.2)	21.0 (69.8)	20.3 (68.5)	20.0 (68.0)	20.1 (68.2)	20.5 (68.9)	20.0 (68.0)	20.6 (69.1)	21.0 (69.7)
Average precipitation mm (inches)	202.0 (7.95)	279.0 (10.98)	291.0 (11.46)	176.0 (6.93)	57.0 (2.24)	61.0 (2.40)	19.0 (0.75)	6.0 (0.24)	11.0 (0.43)	12.0 (0.47)	6.0 (0.24)	37.0 (1.46)	1,157 (45.55)
Average relative humidity (%)	84	86	86	85	83	85	83	81	80	81	81	81	83
Source: FAO
