= Cedano =

Cedano or Cedaño is a Spanish surname.

People with this surname include:

- Marco Cedano (born 1951), Mexican master distiller and tequila entrepreneur
- Pablo Cedano Cedano, Auxiliary Bishop emeritus of the Roman Catholic Archdiocese of Santo Domingo
- Sergio Cedano, soccer player on the All-time Lancaster Rattlers roster
- Federico Monteverde Cedano, from the List of governors of Melilla
- Marcelino Cedano, delegate to the Constitutional Congress of Querétaro for Tepic Territory
- Ramón Emilio Cedaño, a Dominican boxer who fought Jonathan Guzmán, Emmanuel Rodríguez and Jonathan González
- Rafael Antonio Julian Cedano, head of mission from the Dominican Republic to Bolivia and Peru
- Darío Cedano, Colombian cyclist in the 1998 Vuelta a Colombia, 2001 Clásico RCN
- John Zair Cedano, Colombian cyclist in the 2005 Clásico RCN

== See also ==
- Cedeño (disambiguation)
- Sedano (disambiguation)
