= Yanetsy Terry Gutiérrez =

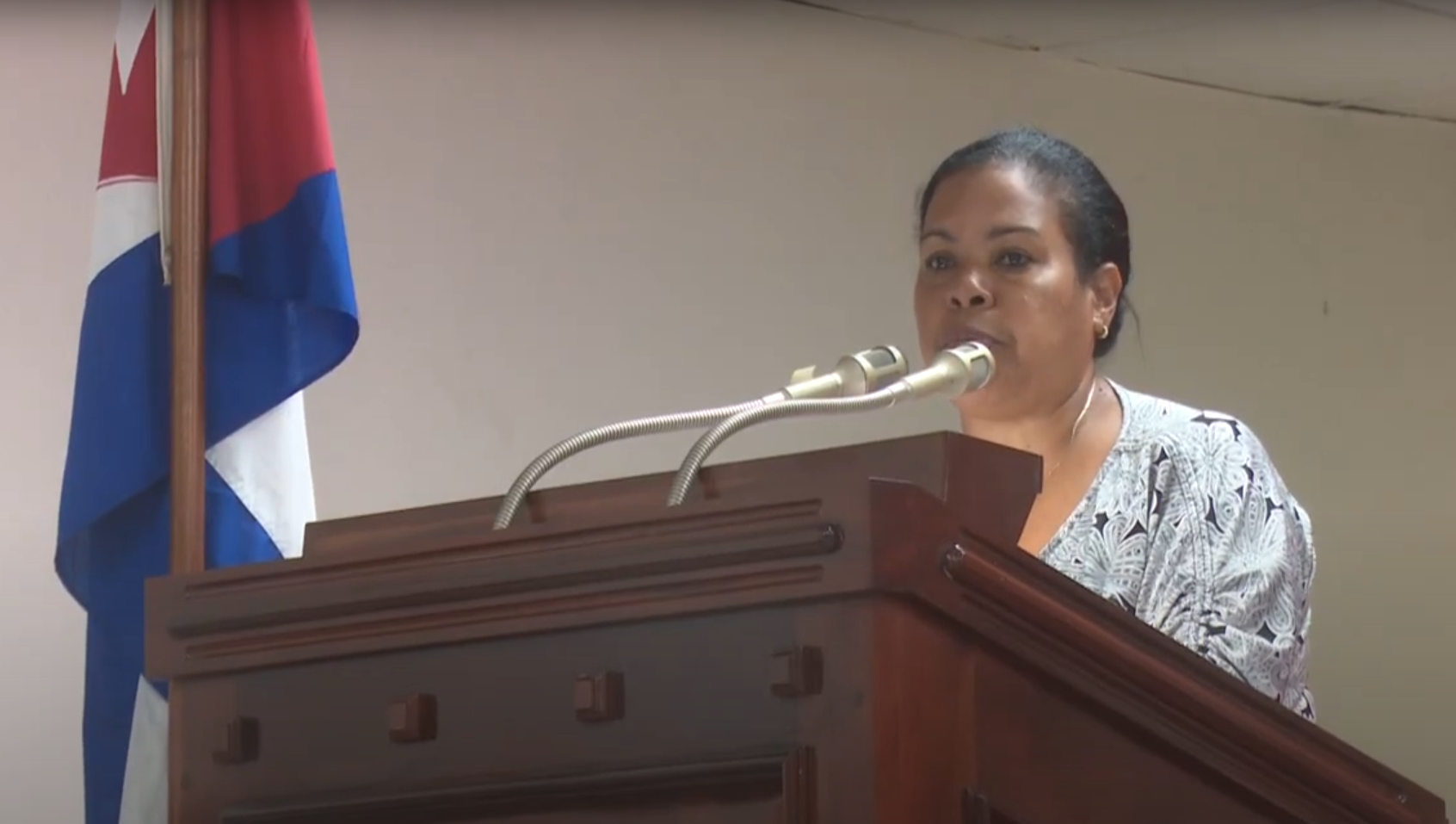
- Yanetsy Terry Gutiérrez seen in 2024 giving a speech on the anniversary of Fidel Castro's Death

2nd Governor of Granma Province
- Incumbent
- Assumed office 4 June 2023
- Vice Governor: Teresa Luisa Pérez Trinchet (4 June 2023-21 July 2025); José Luis Vega Pérez (21 July 2025-present)
- Preceded by: Francisco Alexis Escribano Cruz

1st Vice-Governor of Granma Province
- In office 8 February 2020 – 4 June 2023
- Governor: Francisco Alexis Escribano Cruz
- Succeeded by: Teresa Luisa Pérez Trinchet

Personal details
- Born: December 18, 1976 (age 49) Pilón, Granma Province, Cuba
- Citizenship: Cuba
- Party: PCC
- Other political affiliations: CDR; CTC; FMC

Yanetsy Terry Gutiérrez is a Cuban politician and the current governor of Granma Province, elected on 28 May 2023.

== Early life ==
Terry Gutiérrez was born in Pilón, in the south of the province.

== Education ==
Terry Gutiérrez holds a degree in Marxism-Leninist history, and a masters in management sciences.

== Career ==
=== Before politics ===
She first worked at Juan Vitalio Acuña Núñez Secondary School in Pilón, becoming the Methodologist at the Municipal Education Department.

=== Early politics ===
In 2002, she became the secretary and later the president of the Municipal Assembly of People's Power of Pilón.

She was elected to National Assembly of People's Power in the VI Legislature. She became Deputy Director of Culture of Granma Province in 2005, and in 2009 went back to the National Assembly.

=== Provincial roles ===
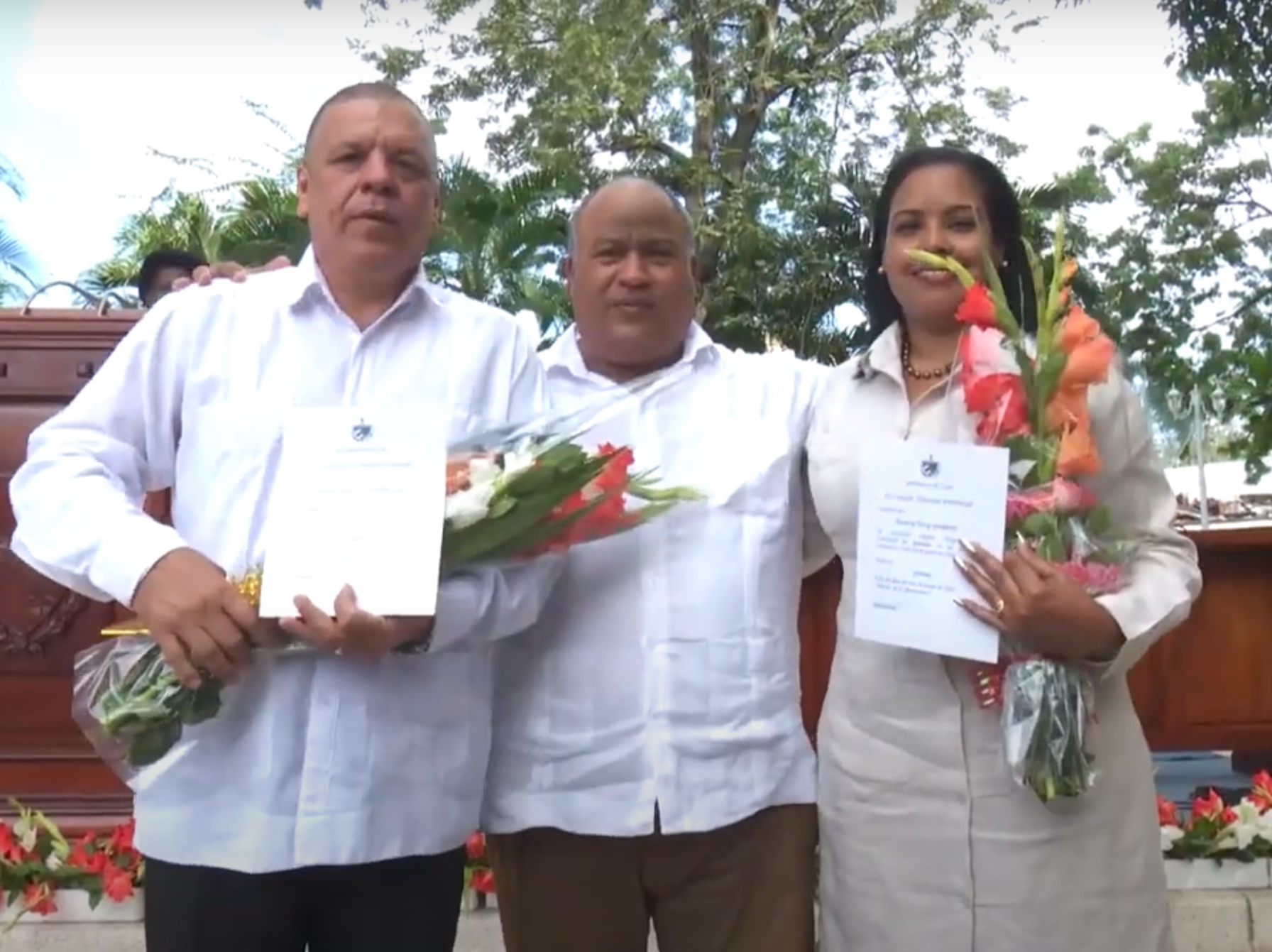
Alexis Escribano Cruz and Yanetsy Terry Gutiérrez seen at there inauguration, in Bayamo

She was elected the vice-governor of Granma Province in January 2020, winning 99.68 percent of the vote. Her governor became Francisco Alexis Escribano Cruz, which she got inaugurated with 8 February 2020.

She was elected governor of the province 28 May 2023, winning 99.58 percent of the vote, and her vice-governor being Teresa Luisa Pérez Trinchet. She was inaugurated along her vice-governor 4 June 2023, in the Bayamo Theater in Bayamo, the capital of the province. In July 2025, Terry Gutiérrez toured the city of Bayamo, after the July 2025 Cuban floods, in the most affected parts of the city.

On 21 July 2025, Teresa Luisa Pérez Trinchet was replaced as vice-governor with José Luis Vega Pérez taking office, which took place at a ceremony, which Terry Gutiérrez attended.
