= Sedan =

Sedan may refer to:

== Transportation ==
- Sedan (automobile), a type of passenger car
- Sedan chair, or Litter (vehicle), a human-powered, wheelless device for transport of persons
- Franklin Sedan, built by H. H. Franklin Manufacturing Company, Syracuse, New York
- Prince Sedan, built by Prince Motor Company from 1952 to 1958
- Sero Sedan, an electric microcar marketed by Sero Electric since 2019
- Aeronca Sedan, a light aircraft built by Aeronca Aircraft from 1948 to 1951
- Curtiss-Wright CW-15 Sedan, a 1930s American utility aircraft
- Luscombe 11 Sedan, a 1940s American utility aircraft
- Sedan station, a railway station in Sedan, Ardennes, France

== Places ==
=== France ===
- Arrondissement of Sedan, Ardennes
- Principality of Sedan, an independent Protestant state in the Ardennes from 1424 to 1642
- Sedan, Ardennes, a commune

=== United States ===
- Sedan, Indiana, an unincorporated community
- Sedan, Iowa, an unincorporated community
- Sedan, Kansas, a city
- Sedan Township, Chautauqua County, Kansas
- Sedan, Michigan, a former community
- Sedan, Minnesota, a city
- Sedan, Montana, a census-designated place
- Sedan, Nebraska, an unincorporated community
- Sedan, New Mexico, an unincorporated community
- Sedan, Ohio, an unincorporated community
- Sedan, Oklahoma, an unincorporated community
- Sedan, West Virginia, an unincorporated community

=== Elsewhere ===
- Sedan, South Australia, a town
- Sədan, Azerbaijan, a village and municipality
- Strzeszyn, Poznań, a suburban neighbourhood of Poznań named Sedan under Prussian and Nazi rule

== Other uses ==
- Sedan (nuclear test), a 1962 nuclear test in Nevada, United States
  - Sedan Crater, created by the nuclear test
- Battle of Sedan, an 1870 Franco-Prussian War battle that resulted in the capture of Emperor Napoleon III
- Battle of Sedan (1940), a Second World War battle fought during the German invasion of France
- CS Sedan Ardennes, a football club in Sedan, France
- Sedan High School, Sedan, Kansas
- Rolfe Sedan (1896–1982), American actor

== See also ==
- Academy of Sedan, a Huguenot academy in Sedan in the Principality of Sedan, founded in 1579 and suppressed in 1681
- Sadan (disambiguation)
- Sedano (disambiguation)
- Sudan (disambiguation)
