= Marta Hernández Romero =

Cuban mayor (born 1958)

Mayor of Havana
- In office 5 March 2011 – 18 January 2020
- Preceded by: Juan Contino Aslán
- Succeeded by: Reinaldo García Zapata

Personal details
- Born: 19 March 1958 (age 68) Santiago de Cuba, Cuba
- Party: Communist Party of Cuba

Marta Hernández Romero, born in Santiago de Cuba, was the mayor of Havana, Cuba, she was elected on 5 March 2011. She is the President of the People's Power Provincial Assembly of the City of Havana (mayor), diputada to the National Assembly, and a member of the Council of State in the VI Legislature. Soon before being elected as the mayor of the city, she was elected as a delegate to the VI Communist Party Congress and frontrunner to be a member of the Central Committee of the Cuban Communist Party.

She holds a Master of Education, began her career teaching elementary school and reached the position of provincial Director of Education, first in her native Santiago de Cuba and then, since 2003, in Havana.

Hernandez replaces Juan Contino Aslan, who left office in February 2011.

She left office in January 2020 and was replaced by Reinaldo García Zapata.
