= BYM =

The characters BYM can mean:

== Organizational structures of the Religious Society of Friends (Quakers) ==
- Baltimore Yearly Meeting
- Britain Yearly Meeting

== Others ==
- BYM is the international code for Carlos Manuel de Céspedes Airport in Cuba
- Backyard Monsters, online video game
