= Isla Corazón =

Island of Ecuador

Coordinates: 0.652127°S 80.369968°W

Isla Corazon is a naturally heart-shaped mangrove island, located on the Chone River estuary off the city of Bahía de Caráquez in Ecuador's coastal province of Manabi.

The uninhabited island is a nesting site to one of the largest frigate bird colonies in the Pacific, along with a host of other bird species. The island was expanded through the mangrove restoration efforts of the local fishermen and was named a National Wildlife Refuge shortly thereafter. This group of fishermen started Isla Corazon Tours and now give canoe-led tours of the mangrove ecosystem, departing from Puerto Portovelo, just up the road from San Vicente.
