= Sedano =

Sedano may refer to:

== People ==
- Andrés Sedano (born 1973), Guatemalan former swimmer who competed in the 1992 Summer Olympics
- Paco Sedano (born 1979), Spanish futsal player
- Jorge Sedano (born 1977), American sports broadcaster
- José Antonio Picón Sedano (born 1988), Spanish footballer

== Places ==
- Sedano y Las Loras, another name for Páramos, a comarca located northwest of the province of Burgos, Castile and León
- Valle de Sedano, a municipality located in the province of Burgos, Castile and León

== See also ==
- Sedano's, the largest Hispanic-owned supermarket chain in the United States founded by Rene Sedano
- Sedona, Arizona, a city that straddles the county line between Coconino and Yavapai counties
- Sedan (disambiguation)
- Cedano, a Spanish surname
