= King Arthur Park, Montana =

- Census-designated place
- Location within Montana Location within the United States
- Coordinates: 45°39′58″N 111°07′28″W
- Country: United States
- State: Montana
- County: Gallatin

Area
  - Total: 0.47 sq mi (1.21 km^{2})
  - Land: 0.46 sq mi (1.20 km^{2})
  - Water: 0.0039 sq mi (0.01 km^{2})
- Elevation: 4,843 ft (1,476 m)

Population (2020)
  - Total: 1,549
  - Density: 3,348.2/sq mi (1,292.74/km^{2})
- Time zone: UTC-7 (Mountain (MST))
  - Summer (DST): UTC-6 (MDT)
- Area code: 406
- FIPS code: 30-40685
- GNIS feature ID: 2583820

King Arthur Park is a census-designated place (CDP) and trailer park in Gallatin County, Montana, United States. As of the 2020 census, King Arthur Park had a population of 1,549.

== History ==
=== Tenants' strike ===
In 2025, the prospect of the trailer park being sold, potentially to a private equity firm, led to residents forming a tenants' union. Residents feared that a sale to private equity would lead to steep rent increases. On May Day in 2026, tenants began a rent strike following a rent increase which park owners declined to discuss with the tenants' union. The park's landlord promised evictions in response.

== Demographics ==
Historical population
Census	Pop.	Note	%±
2020	1,549		—
U.S. Decennial Census

=== 2020 census ===
As of the 2020 census, King Arthur Park had a population of 1,549. The median age was 30.9 years. 23.0% of residents were under the age of 18 and 9.3% of residents were 65 years of age or older. For every 100 females there were 104.9 males, and for every 100 females age 18 and over there were 103.2 males age 18 and over.

100.0% of residents lived in urban areas, while 0.0% lived in rural areas.

There were 602 households in King Arthur Park, of which 34.7% had children under the age of 18 living in them. Of all households, 44.4% were married-couple households, 21.9% were households with a male householder and no spouse or partner present, and 24.8% were households with a female householder and no spouse or partner present. About 30.0% of all households were made up of individuals and 8.6% had someone living alone who was 65 years of age or older.

There were 637 housing units, of which 5.5% were vacant. The homeowner vacancy rate was 2.3% and the rental vacancy rate was 2.6%.

Racial composition as of the 2020 census
Race	Number	Percent
White	1,369	88.4%
Black or African American	1	0.1%
American Indian and Alaska Native	14	0.9%
Asian	32	2.1%
Native Hawaiian and Other Pacific Islander	0	0.0%
Some other race	39	2.5%
Two or more races	94	6.1%
Hispanic or Latino (of any race)	96	6.2%

== Education ==
The CDP is in Bozeman Elementary School District and Bozeman High School District. The Bozeman elementary and high school districts are both a part of Bozeman Public Schools.
