= Conny Méndez =

Venezuelan composer, singer, writer, caricaturist and actress (1898–1979)

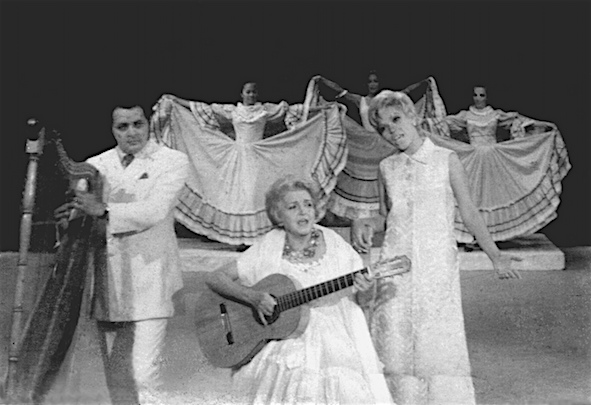
- Born: 11 April 1898; Caracas, Venezuela
- Died: 26 November 1979 (aged 81); Miami, Florida, U.S.

Juana María de la Concepción Méndez Guzmán, commonly referred as Conny Méndez (11 April 1898 – 26 November 1979) was a Venezuelan composer, singer, writer, caricaturist, actress and metaphysicist.

== Biography ==
Her parents were the poet Eugenio Mendez y Mendoza and Lastenia Guzman. Her schooling was in Caracas and New York City. In New York, Mendez studied paint in the Art Student's and music in the New School of Music.

During the 1920s she returned to Caracas, and collaborated as a writer and caricaturist in different magazines and newspapers, including El Nuevo Diario, Elite and Nosotras. These cartoons were collected in the work Bistury: Album de caricaturas (1931).

In 1946 Mendez founded the Christian Metaphysics movement in Venezuela, under the influence of Count Saint-Germain, the European occultist.

During the first years of the 1950s, she worked as an actress in "Camas separadas" of Terence Rattingam, directed by Horacio Peterson at the Caracas Theater Club. In 1955, she published her autobiography titled "Memorias de una loca" (Memories of a crazy woman) and in 1967 her book "Del guayuco al quepis".

However, it was in the field of composition and musical interpretation, where she did her more fruitful work. Her folk and popular music included more than 40 compositions, like "Chucho y Ceferina" (A couple of natives), "La Negrita Marisol" (A creole girl), "Venezuela Habla Cantando" (Venezuela speaks like singing), and many others.

She inspired Chabuca Granda, a Peruvian composer who wrote songs dedicated to her country and to nature when, at that time, in Peru, "people mainly sang to broken hearts” she said. These are songs that never go out of fashion. The miracle of the popular song is that different countries perform it in their own way.”

The last years of her life were exclusively dedicated to the study of Christian metaphysics. In 1977 she published a series of works about this topic, among them: "Metafisica al alcance de todos" (Metaphysics for Everyone) (1977) and "Misterios develados" (Unveiled Mysteries) (1979) and "El librito azul" (The blue booklet). She was born in Caracas and died in Miami, Florida, United States.

== Family ==
- Joseph Rincones (ex-husband)
- Donald Rincones (son)
- Alexandra Rincones (granddaughter)
- Daniel Rincones (grandson)
- Antonieta Rincones (great-granddaughter)

== Bibliography ==
- Metafísica al Alcance de Todos (English title: Metaphysics for Everyone)
- Te Regalo lo que Se Te Antoje
- El Maravilloso Número 7
- ¿Quién es y Quién Fue el Conde de Saint Germain?
- Piensa Lo Bueno y Se Te Dará
- Metafísica 4 en 1 (English title: Power through Metaphysics)
- El Nuevo Pensamiento
- ¿Qué es la Metafísica?
- El Librito Azul
- Un Tesoro Más para Ti
- La Voz del "Yo Soy"
- La Carrera de Un Átomo
- Numerologìa 22

== See also ==
- Venezuela
- Venezuelan music
- Metaphysics
- Rubén Cedeño
