= Yanet Hernández Pérez =

Cuban politician

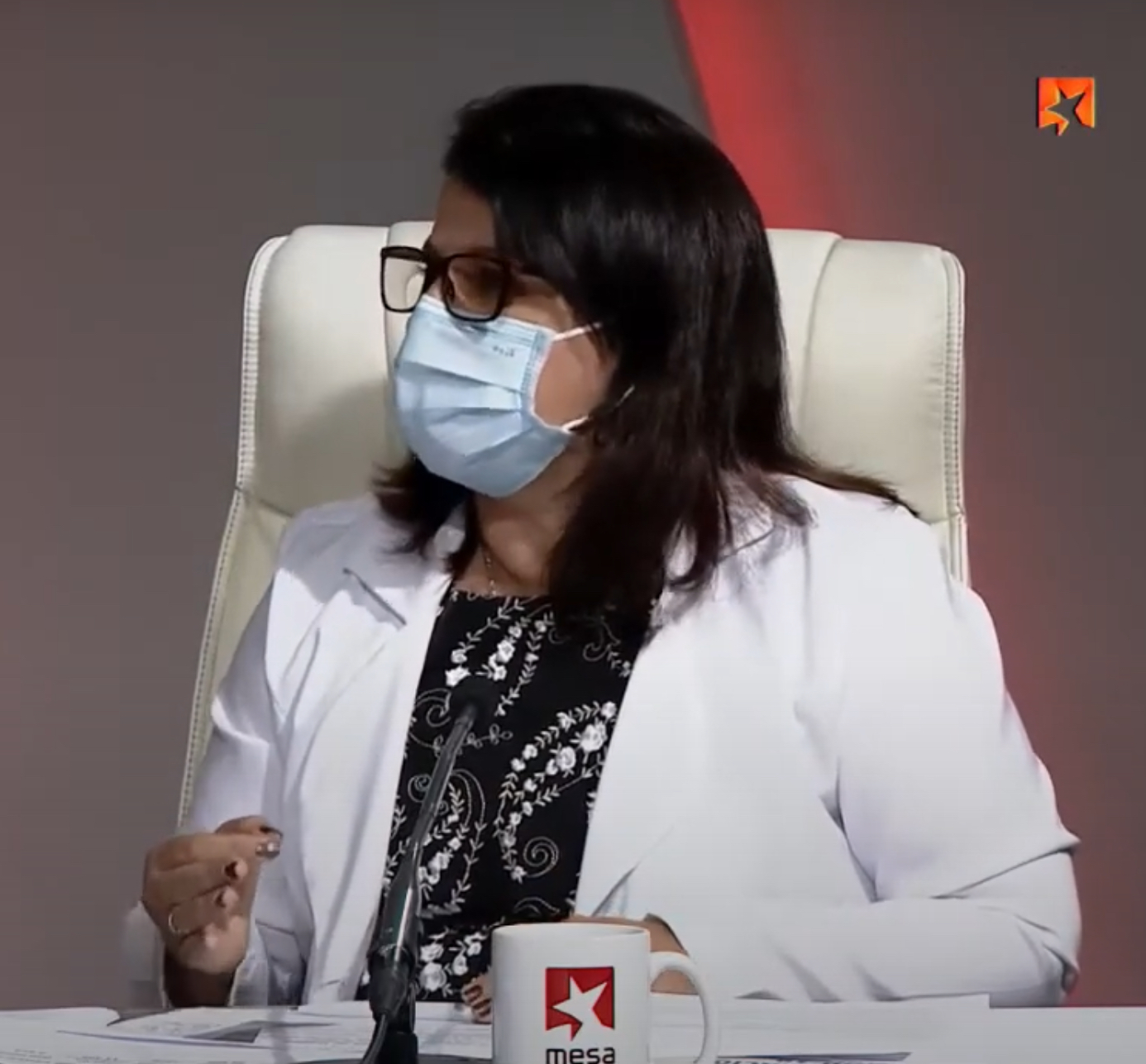
- Yanet Hernández Pérez seen in 2020 on Mesa Redonda Internacional

2nd Governor of La Habana Province
- Incumbent
- Assumed office 4 June 2023
- Vice Governor: Jesús Otamendiz Campos
- Preceded by: Reinaldo García Zapata

1st Vice-Governor of La Habana Province
- In office 8 February 2020 – 4 June 2023
- Governor: Reinaldo García Zapata
- Succeeded by: Jesús Otamendiz Campos

Deputy of the National Assembly of People’s Power
- Incumbent
- Assumed office 2013

Personal details
- Born: November 5, 1969 (age 56) Habana, Cuba
- Citizenship: Cuba
- Party: PCC
- Other political affiliations: CDR; CTC; FMC

Yanet Hernández Pérez is a Cuban politician and the current governor of La Habana Province, elected on 28 May 2023.

== Education ==
She graduated as a primary school teacher at Salvador Allende Pedagogical School, with her having a PhD in Pedagogical sciences.

== Career ==
=== Before politics ===
She was a teacher and psychologist at the Solidaridad con Namibia Special School, a methodologist for special schools, a principal of a primary school, and later the municipal director of La Lisa.

She later served as Vice-Director and Director of the Provincial Education Directorate of La Habana Province.

She served as a member of an International Conference of Trade with Argentina.

=== Political career ===
She was a member of the provincial committee of La Habana Province in the 7th and 8th legislator.

She represented Cuba at the 7th Summit of the Americas, and helped with drafting the current 2019 Constitution of Cuba.

On 18 January 2020, she was elected as vice-governor of La Habana Province, along with Reinaldo García Zapata as governor, where she won 94.95 percent of the vote.

She was elected governor of La Habana Province on 28 May 2023, where she won 97.16 percent of the vote, with Jesús Otamendiz Campos becoming her vice-governor.
