= Bridger, Gallatin County, Montana =

- Census-designated place
- Location within Montana Location within the United States
- Coordinates: 45°48′40″N 110°53′45″W
- Country: United States
- State: Montana
- County: Gallatin

Area
  - Total: 3.61 sq mi (9.34 km^{2})
  - Land: 3.60 sq mi (9.32 km^{2})
  - Water: 0.0039 sq mi (0.01 km^{2})
- Elevation: 6,090 ft (1,860 m)

Population (2020)
  - Total: 72
  - Density: 20.0/sq mi (7.72/km^{2})
- Time zone: UTC-7 (Mountain (MST))
  - Summer (DST): UTC-6 (MDT)
- Area code: 406
- FIPS code: 30-09500
- GNIS feature ID: 2583793

Bridger is a census-designated place (CDP) in Gallatin County, Montana, United States.

== Geography ==
The community includes the Bridger Bowl Ski Area and some nearby residences on the eastern side of the Bridger Range in southwestern Montana.

Montana Highway 86 forms the eastern edge of the CDP, leading north and east 23 miles (37 km) to Wilsall and south and west 16 miles (26 km) to Bozeman. Bridger Creek, a tributary of the Gallatin River, flows southwards through the eastern part of the CDP.

According to the U.S. Census Bureau, the Bridger CDP has a total area of 3.6 square miles (9.3 km^{2}), of which 0.004 square miles (0.01 km^{2}), or 0.16%, is water.

As of the 2010 census the Bridger CDP had a population of 30.

== Climate ==
Bozeman 12 NE is a weather station located in Bridger at an elevation of 5950 ft (1814 m).

Climate data for Bozeman 12 NE, Montana, 1981–2010 normals, 1950–1995 extremes: 5950ft (1814m)
Month	Jan	Feb	Mar	Apr	May	Jun	Jul	Aug	Sep	Oct	Nov	Dec	Year
Record high °F (°C)	58 (14)	60 (16)	68 (20)	77 (25)	83 (28)	90 (32)	93 (34)	95 (35)	88 (31)	83 (28)	69 (21)	68 (20)	95 (35)
Mean maximum °F (°C)	49.8 (9.9)	52.2 (11.2)	56.8 (13.8)	65.6 (18.7)	75.0 (23.9)	81.3 (27.4)	85.9 (29.9)	85.8 (29.9)	80.7 (27.1)	72.3 (22.4)	57.9 (14.4)	50.4 (10.2)	87.6 (30.9)
Mean daily maximum °F (°C)	34.8 (1.6)	36.5 (2.5)	42.6 (5.9)	49.9 (9.9)	58.8 (14.9)	67.1 (19.5)	76.0 (24.4)	76.2 (24.6)	65.8 (18.8)	54.1 (12.3)	40.0 (4.4)	32.9 (0.5)	52.9 (11.6)
Daily mean °F (°C)	22.0 (−5.6)	24.1 (−4.4)	29.7 (−1.3)	36.6 (2.6)	44.4 (6.9)	51.7 (10.9)	57.9 (14.4)	56.9 (13.8)	49.0 (9.4)	39.8 (4.3)	28.1 (−2.2)	21.0 (−6.1)	38.4 (3.6)
Mean daily minimum °F (°C)	9.2 (−12.7)	11.8 (−11.2)	16.7 (−8.5)	23.4 (−4.8)	30.0 (−1.1)	36.2 (2.3)	39.9 (4.4)	37.5 (3.1)	32.3 (0.2)	25.6 (−3.6)	16.2 (−8.8)	9.1 (−12.7)	24.0 (−4.4)
Mean minimum °F (°C)	−23.2 (−30.7)	−18.4 (−28.0)	−12.4 (−24.7)	4.0 (−15.6)	17.9 (−7.8)	26.5 (−3.1)	30.7 (−0.7)	29.7 (−1.3)	18.7 (−7.4)	8.0 (−13.3)	−8.9 (−22.7)	−17.4 (−27.4)	−33.1 (−36.2)
Record low °F (°C)	−45 (−43)	−43 (−42)	−34 (−37)	−19 (−28)	2 (−17)	20 (−7)	26 (−3)	20 (−7)	3 (−16)	−20 (−29)	−33 (−36)	−47 (−44)	−47 (−44)
Average precipitation inches (mm)	2.12 (54)	1.69 (43)	2.45 (62)	3.59 (91)	4.09 (104)	4.54 (115)	2.09 (53)	2.18 (55)	2.34 (59)	2.82 (72)	2.58 (66)	1.77 (45)	32.26 (819)
Average snowfall inches (cm)	37.8 (96)	29.4 (75)	37.8 (96)	28.5 (72)	11.3 (29)	1.7 (4.3)	0.1 (0.25)	0.3 (0.76)	3.5 (8.9)	12.5 (32)	27.0 (69)	33.3 (85)	223.1 (567)
Source 1: NOAA
Source 2: WRCC (extremes & snowfall)

== Demographics ==
Historical population
Census	Pop.	Note	%±
2020	72		—
U.S. Decennial Census

== Education ==
The CDP is in Bozeman Elementary School District and Bozeman High School District. The Bozeman elementary and high school districts are both a part of Bozeman Public Schools.
