= Sigmund Sobolewski =

Polish Holocaust survivor (1923–2017)

- Sigmund Sobolewski in 1992 about the resistance at Auschwitz
- Born: May 11, 1923; Toruń, Poland
- Died: August 7, 2017 (aged 94); Bayamo, Granma Province, Cuba
- Occupations: Activist, Holocaust survivor
- Known for: Auschwitz imprisonment
- Spouse(s): Ramona Sobolewski (m. 19??)

Sigmund Sobolewski (Polish pronunciation: [ˈzɨɡmunt sɔbɔˈlɛ(f)skʲi], Zygmunt Sobolewski; May 11, 1923 – August 7, 2017) was a Polish Catholic Holocaust survivor and activist. He was the 88th prisoner to enter Auschwitz on the first transport to the concentration camp on June 14, 1940, and remained a prisoner for four and a half years during World War II. He was an opponent of Holocaust denial and was notable as a non-Jewish victim and witness who confronted neo-Nazis, antisemites and Holocaust deniers. His life and memories as a survivor are recounted in Prisoner 88: The Man in Stripes by Rabbi Roy Tanenbaum.

== Early life ==
Sobolewski was born in Toruń, Poland, the son of the mayor of a small Polish town.

== Auschwitz, 1940–1944 ==
Sobolewski was imprisoned at Auschwitz at the age of 17 as a result of the anti-Nazi activities of his father. Fluent in German, Sobolewski was pressed into service as a translator.

"I survived also because I was young," said Sobolewski. "I didn't realize the seriousness of what was going on. Most of the people who survived were simple people; workers, peasants from Polish villages who couldn't read and write, but who were used to the hard work. Lawyers, doctors, technicians, university graduates: many of them after three or four weeks in Auschwitz had committed suicide because they realized their chances of surviving were very, very slim."

He was the sole surviving witness of the October 7, 1944, revolt at Auschwitz-Birkenau, when a group of Jewish prisoners blew up Crematorium Number 4 and attempted to escape. Sobolewski was on the fire brigade and was ordered to put out the fire. He witnessed the execution of 450 Jewish Sonderkommandos in retaliation.

In a 1999 interview, he said, "I survived only to live with the nagging question, 'What distinguished me from [the Jews]?'"

== Holocaust activism ==
Sobolewski (who was also known in Canada as Sigmund Sherwood or Sigmund Sherwood-Sobolewski) traveled the world following the war and settled in Canada in 1949. In 1967, he was engaged as an activist opposed to neo-Nazism. While living in Toronto, he was among the demonstrators at an event attended by 6,000 people at the Toronto Coliseum to "denounce the rise of neo-Nazi forces in Germany." He went on a 7,000-mile trip across Europe to demand that West Germany compensate members of his Former Prisoners Association, all of whom had been in Nazi camps. He also initiated his activity protesting against neo-Nazism by donning a facsimile of his Auschwitz prison uniform and picketing the appearance of a German neo-Nazi leader on Canadian television.

In 1983, while a hotel owner in Fort Macleod, Alberta, he offered to pay for a trip to Auschwitz for Jim Keegstra, the Alberta teacher who taught the myth of a Jewish world-conspiracy and was a Holocaust denier. Keegstra declined the offer. In 1989, then living in Fort Assiniboine, Alberta, he organized the first Remembrance Service at Edmonton's Holy Rosary Polish Catholic Church attended by local Jewish representatives. He told a reporter after that program that while it was bad to be a Catholic in Auschwitz, "to be a Jew there was hopeless", and that he was concerned that the "Nazi crimes against humanity will be forgotten and swept under the carpet". He noted that he had advertised in a local newspaper for an assistant to help him with his memoirs, and received 43 responses. Only four of the respondents, he said, had heard of Auschwitz.

In 1990, he retraced the route he travelled unwillingly 50 years earlier from Tarnów to Auschwitz-Birkenau to campaign for the creation of four "meditation gardens" at that death camp. That same year, he organized a picket of Aryan Fest, a neo-Nazi festival organized by Terry Long in Alberta. In 1991, he was among those in Chicago to accuse Polish Cardinal Józef Glemp, during his trip there, of being insensitive to Holocaust survivors.

== Later life ==
Sobolewski traveled the world lecturing audiences on his experiences in Auschwitz and warning against Holocaust denial, including a speaking engagement as recently as 2009 to high school students in Alabama. At ceremonies held in Jerusalem in 1995, he was among 3000 Auschwitz survivors who commemorated the 50th anniversary of the camp's liberation.

Sobolewski died of pneumonia complicated by Alzheimer's disease at his home in Bayamo, Cuba, on August 7, 2017, at the age of 94. He was survived by his wife, Ramona Sobolewski, and their three sons.
