= Don Julio =

Brand of tequila produced in Mexico

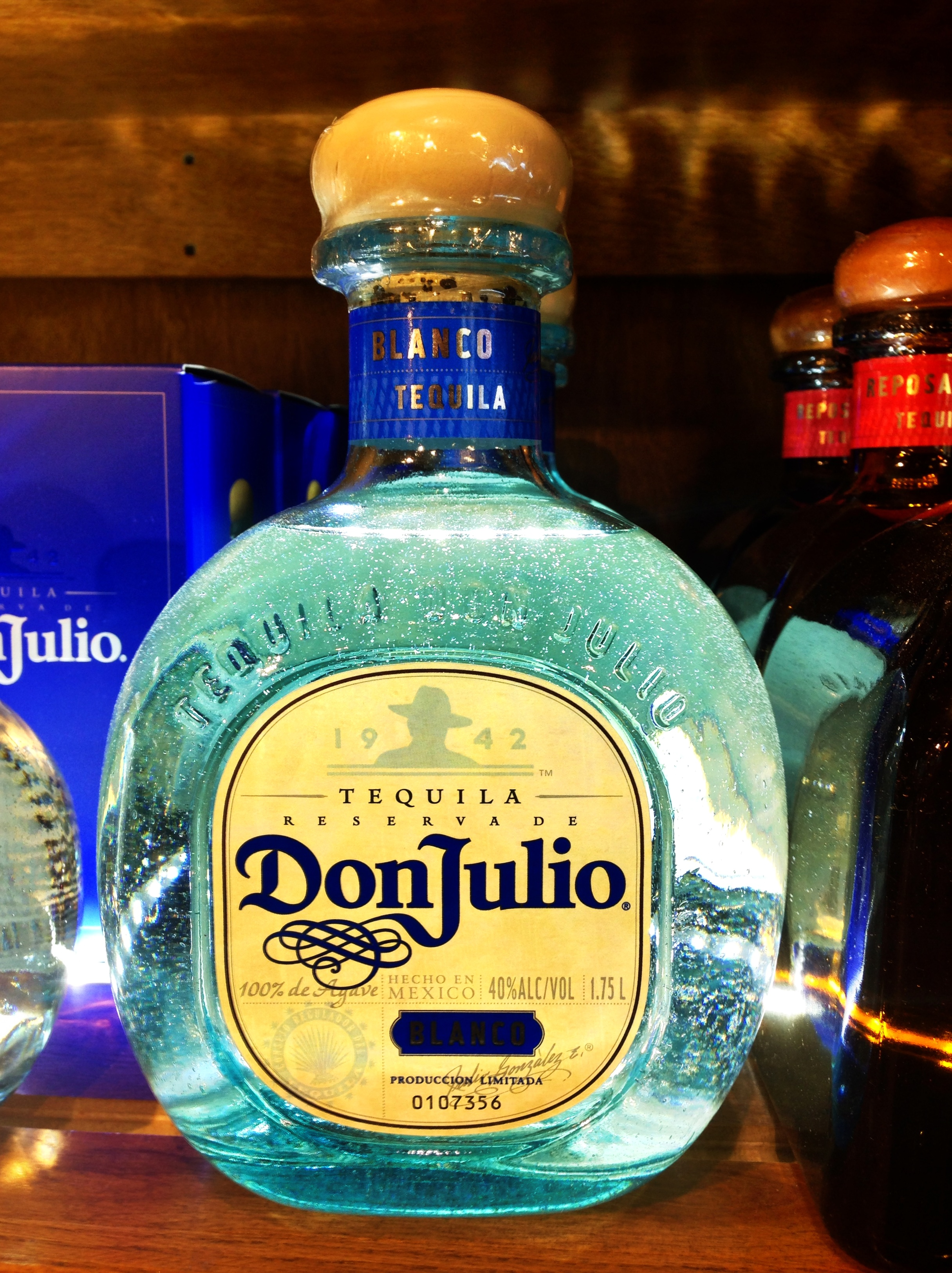
- Type: Premium tequila
- Manufacturer: Diageo
- Origin: Mexico
- Introduced: 1942
- Proof (US): 80
- Variants: Blanco, Reposado, Añejo, 1942, Real, 70

Tequila Don Julio, S.A. de C.V.
- Company type: Private
- Industry: Distilled beverages
- Founded: Atotonilco El Alto, Jalisco, Mexico (1942)
- Key people: Don Julio Gonzalez Estrada, founder
- Products: Tequila
- Website: donjulio.com

Don Julio is a brand of tequila produced in Mexico. It is owned by the British-based multinational alcoholic beverage company Diageo. It is distilled, manufactured and bottled by Tequila Don Julio, S.A. de C.V. from its corporate facility in the Colonia El Chichimeco district, in the city of Atotonilco El Alto, Jalisco, Mexico.

== History ==
Don Julio Tequila is named after its founder, Don Julio González-Frausto Estrada, who began distilling tequila in 1942 at age 17. Acknowledging the benefits of vertical integration, Gonzalez-Frausto established his own distillery, La Primavera, and spent the next 40 years improving his craft. He experimented with controlling various aspects of the tequila-making process, "from the cultivation of the agave to the bottling of the final product." He named his distillery La Primavera (the Springtime), where he produced his first brand, Tres Magueyes. He is said to have "spent nearly forty years perfecting the craft." Don Julio's first tequilas were shared with friends only, but as word on the quality of his tequila spread, he officially founded a company to put him in business. In 1983, Marco Cedano returned to Don Julio to work as an engineer, where he served as Master Distiller and Distillery Manager of Tequila. In 1985, Don Julio González-Frausto celebrated his 60th Birthday; his sons commemorated the date by creating a Tequila in his name, Don Julio. Following the sheer popularity of the tequila in Guadalajara and neighboring cities, they decided to launch the tequila.

In 1999, the now-defunct Seagram Company Ltd. invested in Tequila Don Julio, S.A. de C.V. of Mexico. The expanded agave plantations were a joint venture between the Gonzalez-Frausto, Funtanet, Andrade Rivera Torres, and Cuaik families. In 1999, Don Julio Gonzalez, delighted to forge a relationship with Seagram, stated, "I am proud that the Gonzalez-Frausto family joins with the Seagram family in a global effort behind Don Julio Tequila. I am committed to overseeing personally the agave plantations that are so vital to the superior and unique quality of the Tequila that bears my name." Diageo signed a joint venture with Casa Cuervo in 2003, selling a 50 per cent stake in Don Julio for 78 million. It was distributed in the United States by Diageo, under licensing from its patent holder, Tequila Don Julio, Sociedad Anónima de Capital Variable, Jalisco, Mexico, but sold worldwide.

In November 2014, Diageo agreed to a deal to take full control of the Don Julio brand. In exchange, Jose Cuervo will receive the Old Bushmills Distillery and pay Diageo $408 million.

== Founder ==
Don Julio Gonzalez-Frausto Estrada was born on 7 January 1925 in Atotonilco, Jalisco, where today's main facility is located. Don Julio learned the meaning of responsibility at an early age by working at his uncle José's tequila distillery. At the age of 23, he married Dorothea Garcia, with whom he had 9 children. In 1942, he started a tequila distillery, which would later be known as "La Primavera." By 1951, with the brand Tres Magueyes, he was on a path that would later become Tequila Don Julio in its different variants: Blanco, Reposado, Añejo, 70, 1942 and Real. Don Julio González-Frausto Estrada died on Tuesday, 20 March 2012 from natural causes.

== Process ==
The agave for Don Julio's Tequila is grown in the highland area of Atotonilco on the family estate. Tequila's major aging process over time takes place in conjunction with the development of agave plants, given that they take seven years to reach maturity. Every agave plant is harvested by hand. The agave plant is cut from its roots and then the spearlike leaves are sheared off. The core that is left is called a piña, which is the raw material used for the making of tequila. The piñas are transported on a truck to Don Julio's Distillery where they are cut into equal sized pieces so that they bake evenly. The piñas are loaded into brick ovens where they are slowly baked over the course of several days. Then the baked piñas are crushed and doused with water, which releases the sweet agave syrup called agave juice. Then yeast is added to the agave water and is left to ferment. After the fermentation process is complete it results in a sweet, slightly alcoholic agave beer which is then put into stills where it is distilled to become tequila. At last, it is put into stainless steel tanks before bottling, or ex-bourbon casks for aging.

== Varieties ==
- Don Julio Blanco
- Don Julio Reposado
- Don Julio Añejo
- Don Julio 70 Añejo Claro
- Don Julio 1942 Añejo
- Don Julio Real Extra Añejo

Several of these offerings have performed well at international spirit ratings competitions. For example, Don Julio's Real tequila was awarded double gold medals at the 2008 and 2011 San Francisco World Spirits Competition and a silver medal at the 2012 competition.
