= Reinaldo García Zapata =

Cuban politician

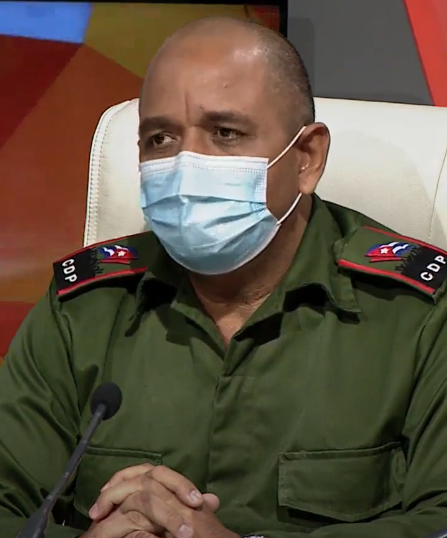

1st Governor of Havana
- In office 8 February 2020 – 4 June 2023
- Vice Governor: Yanet Hernández Pérez
- Succeeded by: Yanet Hernández Pérez

Personal details
- Born: 9 March 1968 (age 58) Santiago de Cuba, Cuba
- Party: Communist Party of Cuba

Reinaldo García Zapata is the former governor of Havana, in Cuba. Garcia Zapata was elected governor of the city/province of Havana on January 18, 2020. He previously held the title of President of the People's Power Provincial Assembly of Havana (mayor).

García replaces Marta Hernández Romero, who left office in January 2020.
