= Ricardo Concepción Rodríguez =

Cuban politician

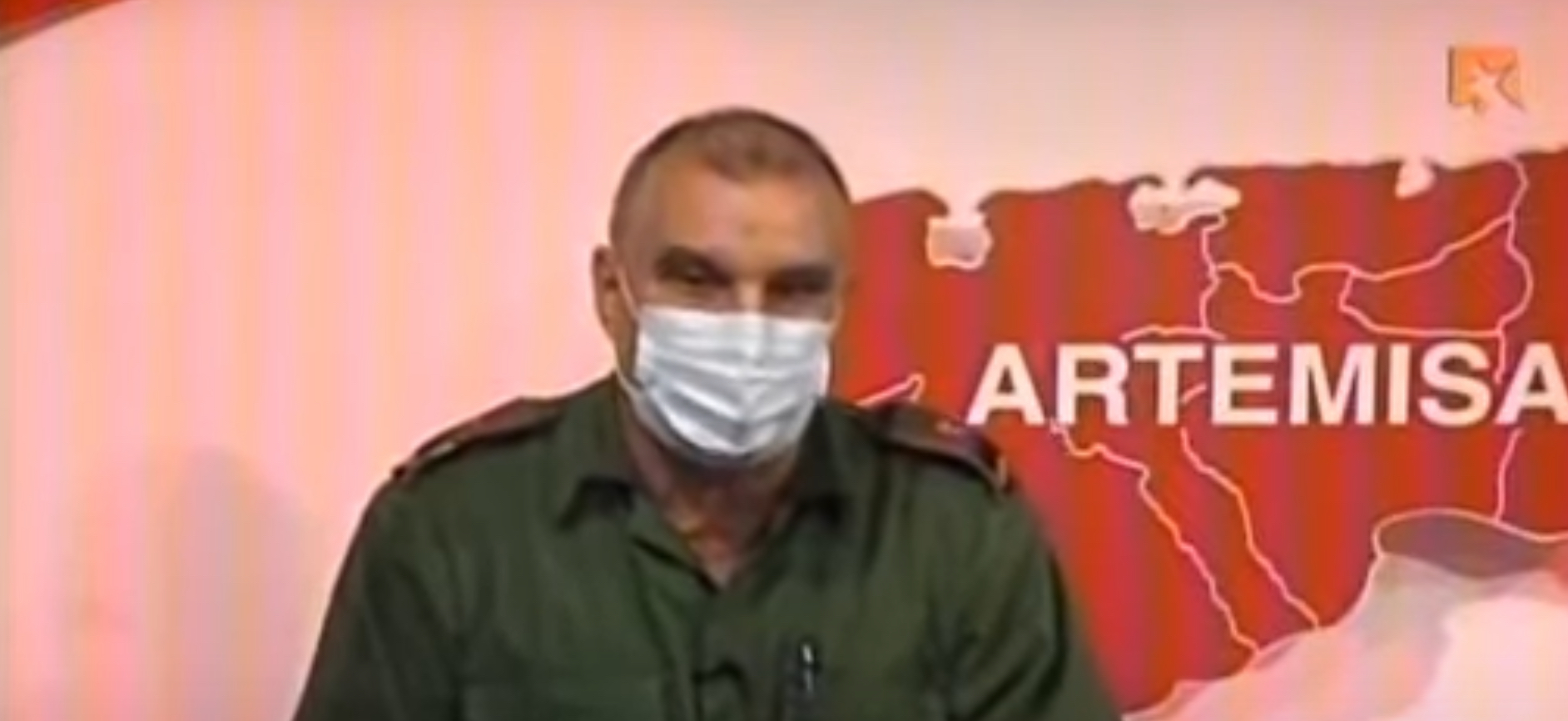
- Concepción Rodríguez seen in 2020 on Mesa Redonda Internacional

1st Governor of Artemisa Province
- Incumbent
- Assumed office 8 February 2020
- Vice Governor: Yamina Duarte Duarte

Personal details
- Born: February 21, 1965 (age 61) Bahía Honda, Pinar del Río Province, Cuba
- Citizenship: Cuba
- Party: PCC
- Other political affiliations: CDR; CTC

Ricardo Concepción Rodríguez is a Cuban politician and the first and current governor of Artemisa Province. He is also a mechanical engineer, and has many roles of construction in western Cuba.

== Early life ==
Concepción Rodríguez was born in Bahía Honda, currently in Artemisa Province, when it was still a part of Pinar del Río Province.

== Career ==
=== Before politics ===
Concepción Rodríguez started off his career as a trainee at the Empresa Provincial de la Construcción (Provincial Construction Company) of Pinar del Río Province in 1989, since graduating from a Mechanical Engineering degree that same year. In 1994, he became the head of mechanics at the Establecimiento Oeste del MICONS (Western Establishment of the Ministry of Construction) in Havana, and was promoted to higher positions of different companies in the construction sector.

In 2010, he was the Deputy Director of the Dirección Integrada de Proyectos (Integrated Project Directorate) of Mariel.

=== Political career ===
In 2003, he was appointed as the vice-president of the Consejo de la Administración Provincial (Provincial Administration Council) of the former La Habana Province.

He was once a member of the National Assembly of People's Power for the municipality of San Cristóbal.

From his role in the Integrated Project Directorate of Mariel, he was appointed to be the head of the Provincial Administration of Artemisa Province, and later became the governor of the province on 8 February 2020, where he won 99.10 percent of the vote. As governor, he supported the creation of the Vial Autopista–Artemisa, restoration of the Ariguanabo Valley protected area, and the repair of public buildings throughout the province.

In 2023, Concepción Rodríguez, along with the president of the Municipal Assembly of People’s Power of San Antonio de los Baños, Bladimir Parada Rodríguez, were declared delegates deputies of the National Assembly of People's Power, representing the aforementioned municipality.

In 2023, Concepción Rodríguez stated that he would be following the Estrategia del Plan de Desarrollo Económico y Social ( Economic and Social Development Plan Strategy) until 2030, after being asked about regulating food sales due to high prices.
