= José Cedeño =

José Cedeño may refer to:

- José Antonio Cedeño (born 1939), Cuban artist
- José Dimas Cedeño Delgado (born 1933), Panamanian Roman Catholic archbishop
