= Bayamo (wind) =

Violent wind in coastal south Cuba, near the Bight of Bayamo

A bayamo is a violent wind blowing from the land on the south coast of Cuba, especially near the Bight of Bayamo. It is also the namesake for Giddings and Webster's most popular tuba mouthpiece.

== See also ==
- Squall
