= Yolexis Rodríguez Armada =

Cuban politician (born 1971)

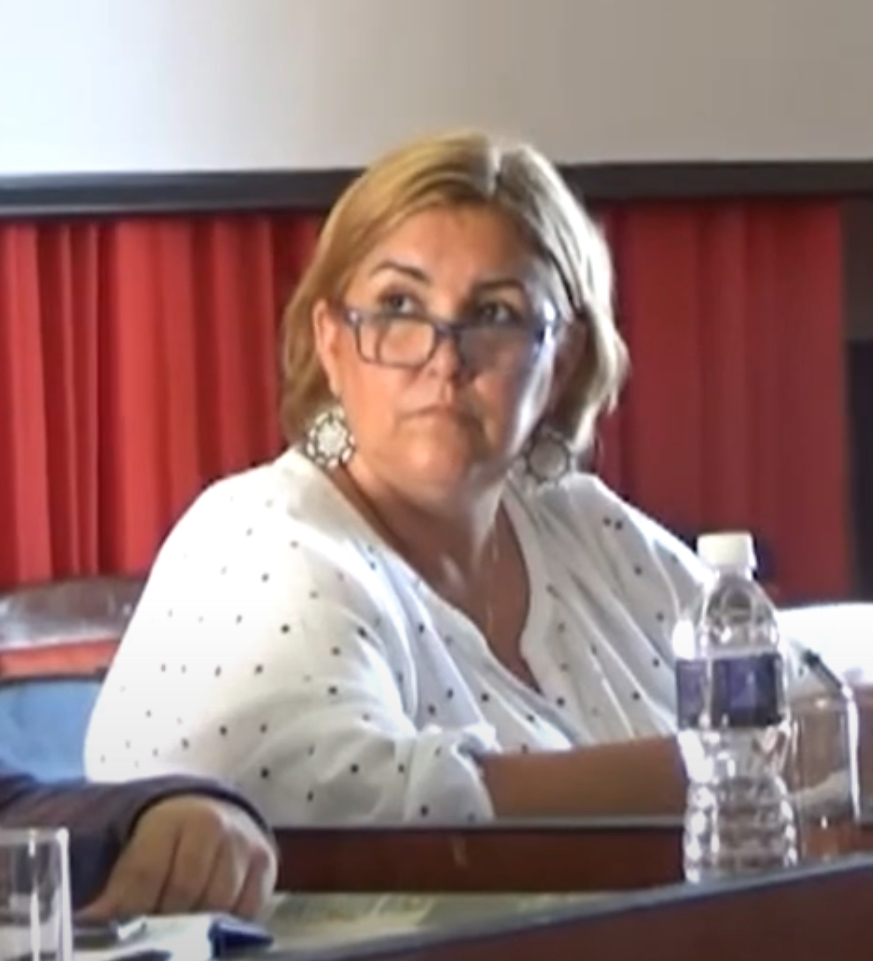
- Rodríguez Armada in 2022

Governor of Cienfuegos Province
- Incumbent
- Assumed office 21 May 2024 acting 24 April – 21 May 2024
- Deputy: Rolando José Rajadel Alzuri
- Preceded by: Alexandre Corona Quintero

Personal details
- Born: 13 April 1971 (age 54)
- Party: Communist Party of Cuba

Yolexis Rodríguez Armada (born 13 April 1971) is a Cuban politician who has served as governor of Cienfuegos Province since 2024. She previously served as its vice governor between 2020 and 2024 and has also been a member of the National Assembly of People's Power since 2023.

== Early life ==
Rodríguez was born on 13 April 1971. She earned a bachelor's degree in accounting and finance and certificates in Tourism Management, Public Administration, and National Security and Defense.

== Career ==
She began working in 1993 at a company and in 1998 moved to the Cienfuegos School of Hospitality and Tourism, where she worked in the finance department.

In 2013, Rodríguez was appointed deputy head of the Territorial Delegation of the Ministry of Tourism of Cuba. She also served as president of the National Association of Economists and Accountants of Cuba.

She was elected vice governor of the Cienfuegos Province in January 2020. Following the resignation of Alexandre Corona Quintero as provincial governor on 24 April 2024 due to mistakes made during his tenure, Rodríguez served as acting governor until she was elected on 4 May by the eight Municipal Assemblies of People's Power, receiving 92.42% of the vote, alongside her deputy governor Rolando José Rajadel Alzuri. She was sworn in on 21 May 2024.

On 12 July 2024 she was elected member of the National Assembly of People's Power by the Municipal Assemblies representing Cumanayagua.
