= Bozeman Public Schools =

School district in Montana, United States

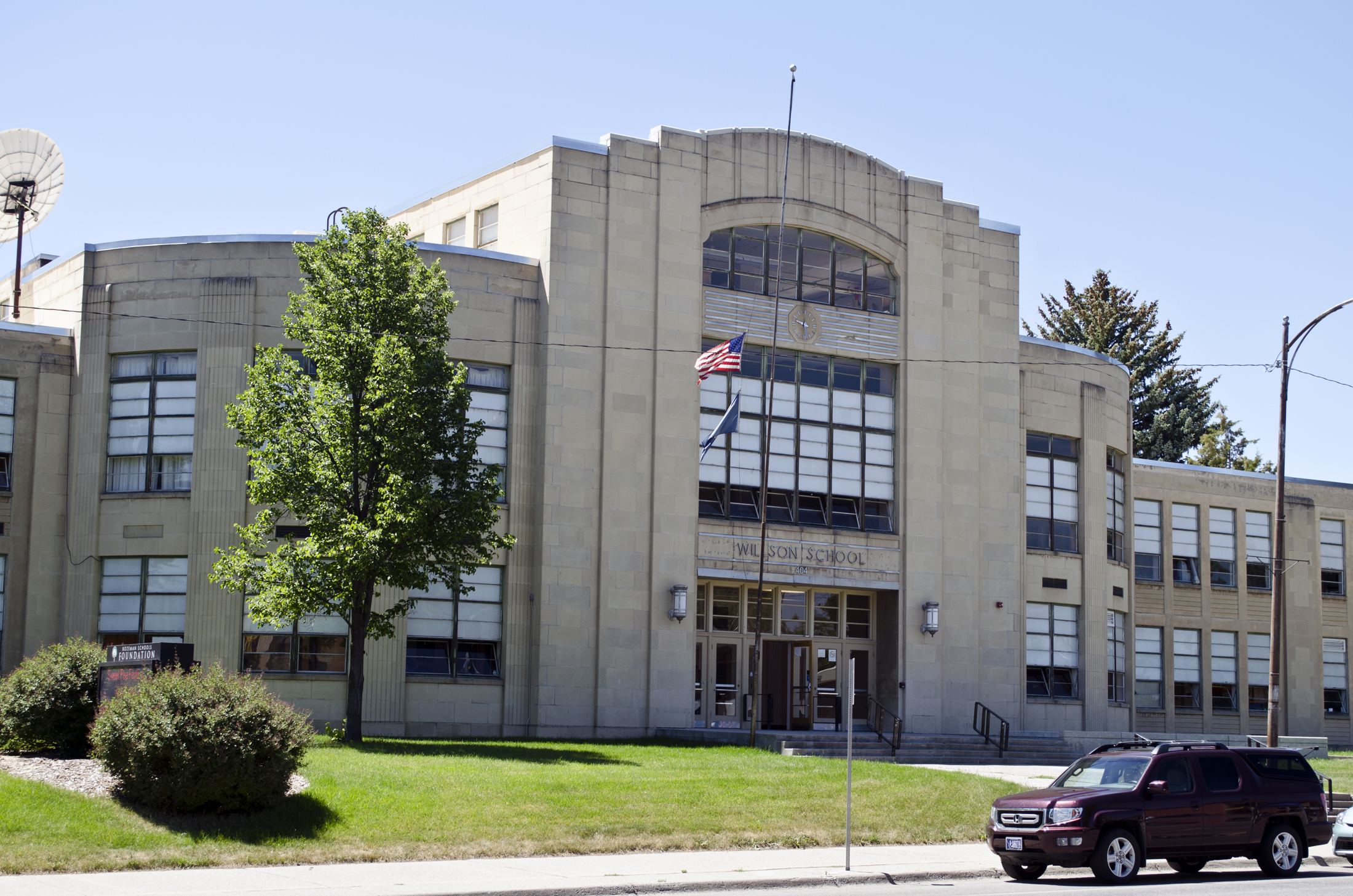
- The Willson Administration building

Address
- 404 West Main Street Bozeman, Gallatin County, Montana, 59715; United States
- Coordinates: 45.6789°N 111.0427°W

District information
- Superintendent: Bob Connors
- District ID: 7

Other information
- Website: www.bsd7.org

Bozeman Public Schools is a school district located in Bozeman, Montana, USA. The district's superintendent is Casey Bertram.

Bozeman Public Schools has two components: Bozeman Elementary School District and Bozeman High School District. The National Center for Education Statistics (NCES) code for the elementary district, which covers grades Pre-Kindergarten to 8, is 3004560. The NCES code for the high school district is 3004590.

The elementary school district includes almost all of Bozeman, as well as Bridger, King Arthur Park, and portions of Four Corners and Gallatin Gateway. The high school district includes that elementary district as well as the remainder of Four Corners and Gallatin Gateway. The high school district also includes Sedan.

Bozeman Public Schools operates the following Schools:

== High schools ==
The high schools in the district operate 9th-12th grade

- Bozeman High School
- Gallatin High School
- Bridger Charter Academy

== Middle schools ==
The middle schools in the district operate 6th-8th grade

- Chief Joseph Middle School
- Sacajawea Middle School

== Elementary schools ==
The elementary schools in the district operate kindergarten-5th grade

- Emily Dickinson Elementary School
- Hawthorne Elementary School
- Hyalite Elementary School
- Irving Elementary School
- Longfellow Elementary School
- Meadowlark Elementary School
- Morning Star Elementary School
- Whittier Elementary School
