= Juan Contino Aslán =

Cuban politician (born 1960)

Juan Contino Aslán (October 12, 1960 in Havana, Cuba) was the city mayor of Havana, Cuba from 2003 until being discharged in February, 2011. He was the President of the People's Power Provincial Assembly of the City of Havana (mayor), a member of the Central Committee of the Cuban Communist Party, a diputado to the National Assembly, and a member of the Council of State, a potential candidate for the Politburo.

Following a political crisis within the Party in 2003 and the removal of Conrado C. Martínez Corona as Mayor of Havana, Contino was called to take over that position. For almost a decade until then he had been in charge (Coordinador Nacional) of the CDRs (Committees for the Defence of the Revolution). Before this, he had been second and then first secretary of the Communist Youth Union (UJC) from the 1980s until 1995, replacing Roberto Robaina (as first secretary ?) in 1993. He is regarded as close to Raúl Castro who supported him against Robaina when the latter was the first secretary of the UJC, Communist Youth Union. He was in Angola from 1989 until 1990. In the late 1970s and early 1980s, he was in charge of the "José Martí" Pioneers Organization (Organización de Pioneros "José Martí").

He is longlisted for the 2008 World Mayor award.
