= Eumelín González Sánchez =

Cuban politician (born 1979)

2nd Governor of Pinar del Río Province
- Incumbent
- Assumed office 28 May 2023
- Vice Governor: Niurka Rodríguez
- Preceded by: Rubén Ramos Moreno

Personal details
- Born: 25 May 1979 (age 46)
- Citizenship: Cuba
- Party: Communist Party of Cuba
- Other political affiliations: Committees for the Defense of the Revolution

Eumelín González Sánchez is a Cuban politician and the governor of Pinar del Río Province since 28 May 2023.

== Career ==
=== Early career ===
González Sánchez first graduated as a mechanical engineer, which helped him begin his career as a Brigade Leader at the MININT Provincial Transportation Workshop, and later Head of Construction of a Military Construction Company and a Technical Assistance Specialist at the Territorial Division of COPEXTEL.

=== Municipal politics ===
In 2010, González Sánchez became a professional member of the PCC, and later became the acting First Secretary of the PCC of Viñales.

=== Provincial politics ===
After acting as first secretary in Vinales, he was promoted to the Executive Bureau of Pinar del Río Province. On 28 May, 2023, González Sánchez was elected governor of the Pinar del Río Province, with 98.37 percent of the vote, which he still holds to this day.
