= List of heads of missions from the Dominican Republic =

This is a list of current heads of Dominican Republic missions abroad. It is up to date as of June 2020.

== Resident heads of missions ==
Mission	Location	Type	Head of Mission	Position	List
Antigua and Barbuda	St. John's	Embassy	Raquel Jacobo	Ambassador	List
Austria	Vienna	Embassy	Lourdes Victoria-Kruse	Ambassador	List
Belgium	Brussels	Embassy	Aníbal De Castro	Ambassador	List
Brazil	Brasília	Embassy	Alejandro Arias	Ambassador	List
Canada	Ottawa	Embassy	Pedro Vergés	Ambassador	List
Chile	Santiago	Embassy	Rubén Silié	Ambassador	List
China	Beijing	Embassy	Briunny Garabito	Ambassador	List
Colombia	Bogotá	Embassy	José Ares	Ambassador	List
Costa Rica	San José	Embassy	Octavio Lister	Ambassador	List
Cuba	Havana	Embassy	Bolívar Marte	Ambassador	List
Ecuador	Quito	Embassy	Víctor Lora	Ambassador	List
Egypt	Cairo	Embassy	Aquiles Ledesma	Ambassador	List
El Salvador	San Salvador	Embassy	Fernando Pérez	Ambassador	List
France	Paris	Embassy	Rosa Hernández de Grullón	Ambassador	List
Germany	Berlin	Embassy	Maybe Sánchez	Ambassador	List
Guatemala	Guatemala City	Embassy	José Leger	Ambassador	List
Haiti	Port-au-Prince	Embassy	Alberto Despradel	Ambassador	List
Vatican City (Holy See)	Vatican City	Embassy	Eunisis Vásquez	Ambassador	List
Honduras	Tegucigalpa	Embassy	Marino Berigüete	Ambassador	List
India	New Delhi	Embassy	Hans Dannenberg	Ambassador	List
Israel	Tel Aviv	Embassy	John Guiliani	Ambassador	List
Italy	Rome	Embassy	Rafael Tejada	Ambassador	List
Jamaica	Kingston	Embassy	Félix García	Ambassador	List
Japan	Tokyo	Embassy	Héctor Domínguez	Ambassador	List
Mexico	Mexico City	Embassy	Jonny Martínez	Ambassador	List
Morocco	Rabat	Embassy	Fior Pichardo	Ambassador	List
Netherlands	The Hague	Embassy	Guillermo Piña	Ambassador	List
Nicaragua	Managua	Embassy	Luis González Sánchez	Ambassador	List
Panama	Panama City	Embassy	Marino Mendoza	Ambassador	List
Paraguay	Asunción	Embassy	Adonaida Medina	Ambassador	List
Peru	Lima	Embassy	Daniel Guerrero	Ambassador	List
Portugal	Lisbon	Embassy	Virgilio Alcántara	Ambassador	List
Qatar	Doha	Embassy	Federico Cuello	Ambassador	List
Russia	Moscow	Embassy	José Castillo	Ambassador	List
South Africa	Pretoria	Embassy	Héctor Galván	Ambassador	List
South Korea	Seoul	Embassy	Humberto Salazar	Ambassador	List
Spain	Madrid	Embassy	Olivo Rodríguez	Ambassador	List
Sweden	Stockholm	Embassy	Laura Faxas	Ambassador	List
Switzerland	Bern	Embassy	Julio Simón Castaños	Ambassador	List
Trinidad and Tobago	Port of Spain	Embassy	José Serulle	Ambassador	List
Turkey	Ankara	Embassy	Elías Serulle	Ambassador	List
United Arab Emirates	Dubai	Embassy	José Soto Jiménez	Ambassador	List
United Kingdom	London	Embassy	Hugo Guiliani	Ambassador	List
United States	Washington, D.C.	Embassy	José Tomás Pérez	Ambassador	List
Uruguay	Montevideo	Embassy	Luis Arias	Ambassador	List
Venezuela	Caracas	Embassy	Mildred Guzmán	Ambassador	List

== Non-resident Heads of Missions ==
The Dominican Republic does not maintain a full embassy in a number of countries. In each of these cases, the heads of Missions to another country, usually a neighbouring one, is concurrently accredited to the other country. In most cases, a smaller, local mission provides for emergencies, and is headed up by a lesser diplomat or a member of the local Dominican community.

Mission	Resident Country	Local Location	Local Mission	Non-Resident Head of Mission	Local Position
Algeria	Algeria	N/A	N/A	Aquiles Ledesma	Ambassador to Egypt
Andorra	Spain	N/A	N/A	Olivo Rodríguez	Ambassador to Spain
Australia	United Kingdom	N/A	N/A	Hugo Guiliani	Ambassador to the United Kingdom
Barbados	Venezuela	N/A	Honorary Consulate	Mildred Guzmán	Ambassador to Venezuela
Belize	Honduras	N/A	N/A	Marino Berigüete	Ambassador to Honduras
Bolivia	Peru	La Paz	Honorary General-Consulate	Daniel Guerrero	Ambassador to Peru
Bulgaria	Austria	Sofia	N/A	Lourdes Victoria-Kruse	Ambassador to Austria
Cyprus	Israel	N/A	N/A	John Guiliani	Ambassador to Israel
Czech Republic	Belgium	Prague	N/A	Aníbal De Castro	Ambassador to Belgium
Denmark	Sweden	Copenhagen	Consulate	Laura Faxas	Ambassador to Sweden
Finland	Sweden	Helsinki	Honorary Consulate	Laura Faxas	Ambassador to Sweden
Guyana	Venezuela	N/A	N/A	Mildred Guzmán	Ambassador to Venezuela
Ireland	United Kingdom	N/A	N/A	Hugo Guiliani	Ambassador to the United Kingdom
Malaysia	India	N/A	N/A	Hans Dannenberg	Ambassador to India
Luxembourg	Belgium	N/A	N/A	Aníbal De Castro	Ambassador to Belgium
Philippines	India	N/A	N/A	Hans Dannenberg	Ambassador to India
Monaco	Monaco	Montecarlo	Honorary Consulate	Rosa Hernández de Grullón	Ambassador to France
Mauritius	India	N/A	N/A	Hans Dannenberg	Ambassador to India
Palestine	Palestine	N/A	N/A	Aquiles Ledesma	Ambassador to Egypt
Poland	Belgium	Warsaw	N/A	Aníbal De Castro	Ambassador to Belgium
Romania	Italy	Bucharest	Honorary Consulate	Rafael Tejada	Ambassador to Italy
Poland	Belgium	Warsaw	N/A	Aníbal De Castro	Ambassador to Belgium
Serbia	Austria	Belgrade	N/A	Lourdes Victoria-Kruse	Ambassador to Austria
Singapore	N/A	N/A	N/A	Héctor Domínguez	Ambassador to Japan
Suriname	Venezuela	N/A	N/A	Mildred Guzmán	Ambassador to Venezuela
Thailand	India	Bangkok	Honorary General-Consulate	Hans Dannenberg	Ambassador to India
Vietnam	India	N/A	N/A	Hans Dannenberg	Ambassador to India

== Heads of Missions to non-sovereign territories ==
Mission	Location	Type	Head of Mission	Position	List
Hong Kong, China SAR	Hong Kong	N/A	Mirna Pichardo	N/A	

== Heads of Missions to International Organisations ==
Mission	Location	Head of Mission	Position	List
European Union	Brussels	Aníbal De Castro	Ambassador, Permanent Representative	
Organization of American States	Washington, D.C.	Josué Fiallo	Ambassador, Permanent Representative	
United Nations in New York	New York City	Francisco Cortorreal	Ambassador, Permanent Representative	
United Nations in New York	New York City	José Singer	Ambassador in Special Mission to the Security Council	
United Nations in Geneva	Geneva	Francisco Caraballo	Ambassador, Permanent Representative to WHO, ILO & other UN agencies	
United Nations in Geneva	Geneva	Katrina Naut	Ambassador, Permanent Representative to WTO	
United Nations in Paris	Paris	José Antonio Rodríguez	Ambassador, Permanent Representative to UNESCO	
United Nations in Rome	Rome	Mario Arvelo	Ambassador, Permanent Representative to FAO, IFAD & WFP	
United Nations in Vienna	Vienna	Lourdes Victoria-Kruse	Ambassador, Permanent Representative	
