= Bayamo =

Municipality in Granma, Cuba

- Municipality
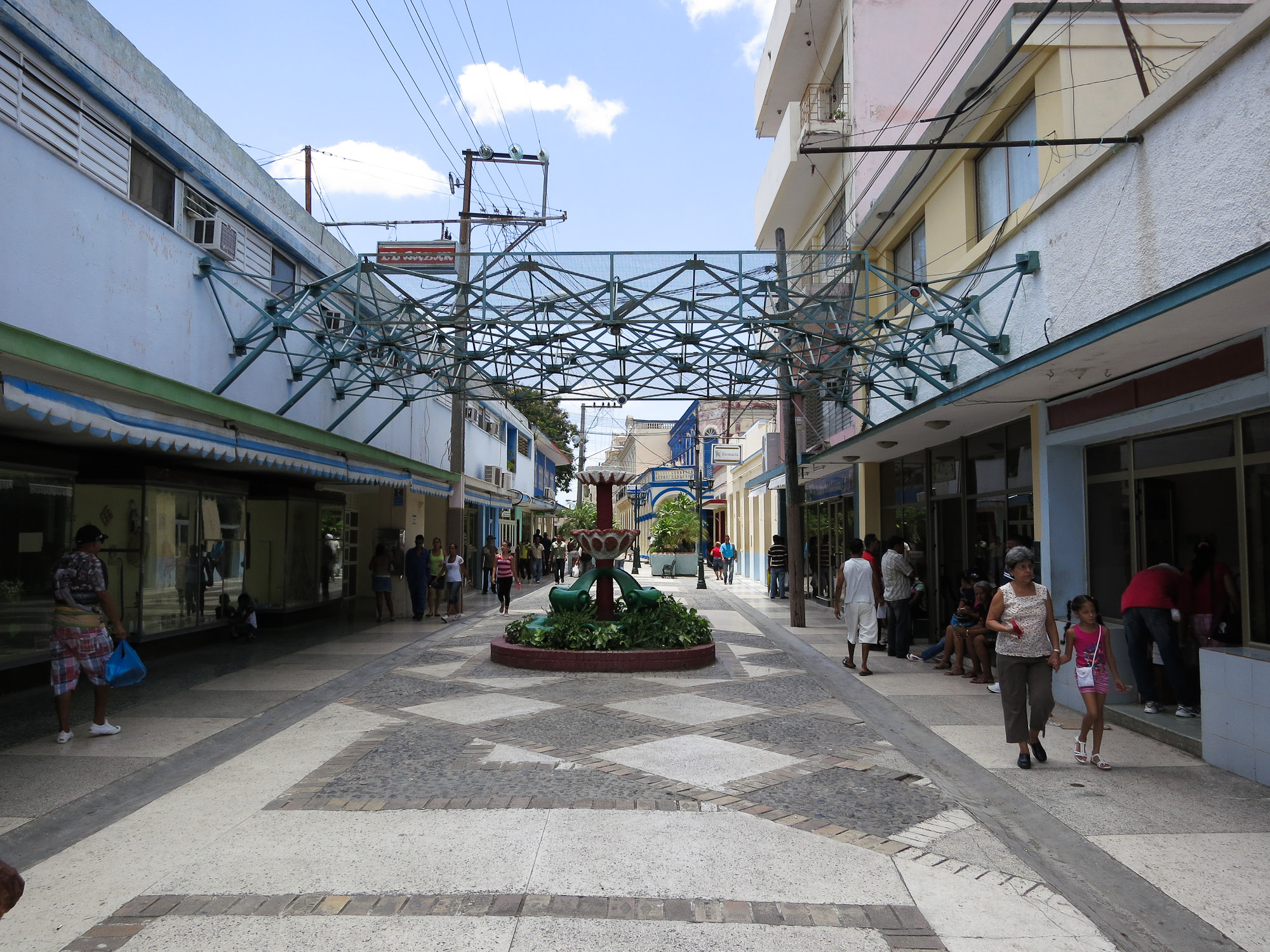
- The "Boulevard" of Bayamo

- Flag Seal

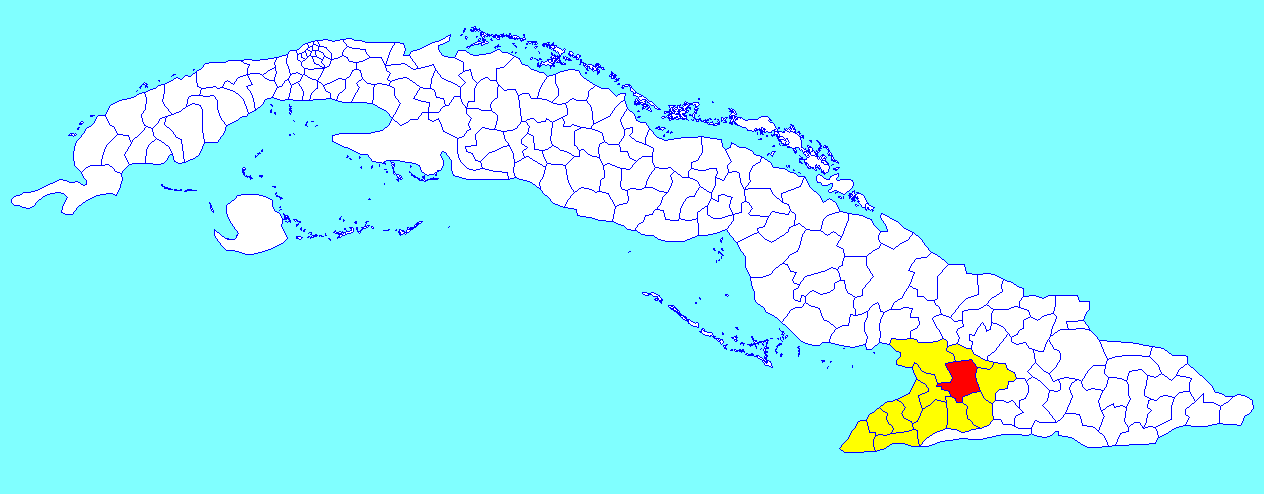
- Bayamo municipality (red) in Granma Province (yellow) and Cuba
- Coordinates: 20°22′54″N 76°38′34″W
- Country: Cuba
- Province: Granma
- Established: November 15, 1513
- Incorporated: 1827 (city)

Government
  - President: Reydier Bernal Gómez

Area
  - Municipality: 918 km^{2} (354 sq mi)
- Elevation: 55 m (180 ft)

Population (2022)
  - Municipality: 236,826
  - Density: 258/km^{2} (668/sq mi)
  - Urban: 169,209
  - Rural: 67,617
- Time zone: UTC-5 (EST)
- Postal code: 85100
- Area code: +53 23
- Vehicle registration: G
- Website: https://www.bayamo.gob.cu/es/

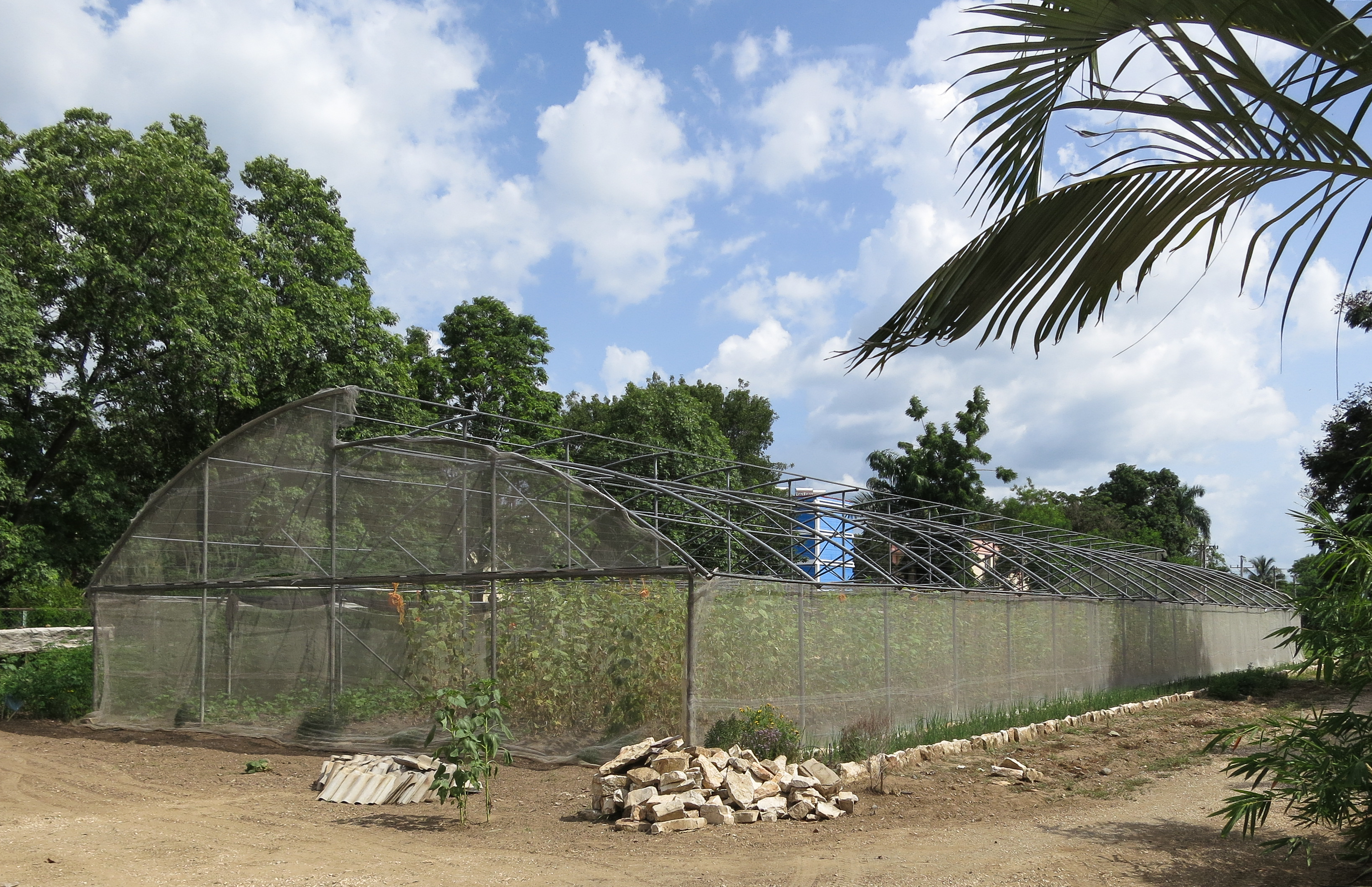
Urban agriculture in Bayamo

Bayamo is the capital city of the Granma Province of Cuba and one of the largest cities in the Oriente region.

== Overview ==
The community of Bayamo lies on a plain by the Bayamo River. It is affected by the violent Bayamo wind.

One of the most important education institutions in the province is the University of Granma.

== History ==
Established in 1513, Bayamo was the second of seven cities founded by Diego Velázquez de Cuéllar. Francisco Iznaga, a Basque landowner in the western portion of Cuba during the first 30 years of the colonization of Cuba, was elected mayor in 1540. Iznaga was the originator of a powerful lineage that finally settled in Trinidad, where the Torre Iznaga (Iznaga Tower) is. His descendants fought for the independence of Cuba, from 1820 to 1900.

During much of the 16th century it was one of the most important agricultural and commercial settlements of the island. Its inland situation gave it relative security against the pirates who infested West Indian seas, and the misfortunes of Santiago were the fortunes of Bayamo. Down the Cauto River, then open to the sea for vessels of 200 tons, and through Manzanillo, Bayamo drove a thriving contraband trade that made it the leading town of Cuba at the opening of the 17th century.

A tremendous flood, in 1616, choked the Cauto with trees and wrecked vessels, cutting it off from direct access to the sea; but through Manzanillo it continued a great clandestine traffic with Curaçao, Jamaica, and other foreign islands throughout the 17th and 18th centuries. Bayamo was then surrounded by fine plantations.

In 1827 it acquired the status of city. In the war of 1868–1878 it was an insurgent stronghold. One of the most desperate conflicts of the war was fought nearby, and it was nearly destroyed by the opposing parties.

== Demographics ==
In 2022, the municipality of Bayamo had a population of 236,826. With a total area of 918 km^{2} (354 sq mi), it has a population density of 242.0/km^{2} (627/sq mi). The urban population was 169,209.

== Transportation ==
Bayamo is an under-developed municipality where most of the inhabitants get around on foot. Per a UN study only about 15% of the population relies on motorized transport and almost three times as many (39%) rely on about 500 licensed horse-drawn carriages generally following fixed routes. The rest of the non-pedestrian traffic is bicycle and bicycle taxi.

Carlos Manuel de Céspedes Airport satisfies the city's commercial aviation needs; it has had service to Havana on Cubana Airlines.

== Notable residents ==
- Francisco Vicente Aguilera (1821–1877), revolutionary
- José Antonio Cedeño (born 1939), artist
- Carlos Manuel de Céspedes (1819–1874), revolutionary
- Perucho Figueredo (1818–1870), composer of the Cuban national anthem
- Pablo Milanés (1943–2022), singer
- Tomás Estrada Palma (1832–1908), first president of Cuba
- Felo Ramírez (1923–2017), radio presenter
- Rolando Uríos (born 1971), handball player
- Sigmund Sobolewski (1923–2017), Polish Holocaust survivor

== See also ==
- La Bayamesa, Cuban national anthem
