= Alberto López Díaz =

Cuban politician

Minister of Food Industry of Cuba
- Incumbent
- Assumed office 2 February 2024
- Preceded by: Manuel Sobrino Martínez

1st Governor of Villa Clara Province
- In office 8 February 2020 – 2 February 2024
- Vice Governor: Milaxy Yanet Sánchez Armas
- Succeeded by: Milaxy Yanet Sánchez Armas

Personal details
- Born: August 8, 1966 (age 59)
- Citizenship: Cuba
- Party: PCC
- Other political affiliations: CDR; CTC

Alberto López Díaz is a Cuban politician and the Minister of Food Industry of Cuba (MINAL), succeeding Manuel Sobrino Martínez in early-2024 due to him being dismissed. He was formerly the governor of Villa Clara Province, from 8 February 2020, reelected May 28th, 2023, until 2 February 2024, when he became the MINAL.

== Career ==
=== Before politics ===
López was a professor, head of a polytechnic institute, and a specialist at a water/sewer company before he joined politics.

=== Local government ===
Lóoez was first a president of a consejo popular in Santa Clara, and later a secretary and vice-president of the Municipal Assembly of Santa Clara.

He then became a director and manager of provincial companies, and in 2007 he became the vice-president of the Provincial Council of People's Power of Villa Clara Province, and later vice president, president, and later governor of Villa Clara.

=== Minister of Food Industry ===
López became the Minister of Food Industry of Cuba (MINAL) in early-2024, succeeding Manuel Sobrino Martínez, after Sobrino was dismissed due to his lack of providing food supplies and poor management. He made promises to transform these issues, and throughout the rest of the year he made comments on why this hasn't yet to happen. In July, he stated to the public that they have a lack of resources and that the production model needed to be changed, although he stated later in November that these problems haven't changed. In December, López stated in-front of the National Assembly of People's Power that the government of Miguel Díaz-Canel's "continuity" has put the country into one of the worst food crisis it has ever seen. In the same speech he also stated a strategy on how to slowly transform the production so that food can be at a more affordable price.

López has made plans in order to increase production for 2025, with at an aim at doubling cooperative production and having a 26 percent increase in contributions to the country. It also urged for more cultivation of different types of seafood, but it remained mostly stagnant or sent for exports, with international sales not helping the domestic economy, due to no actual investments being made.
