= San Clemente, Ecuador =

Coastal village located in the province of Manabí, Ecuador

San Clemente is a coastal village located in the province of Manabí, Ecuador. The population is approximately 2,000 inhabitants, most of whom are families working in fishing or tourism.
