= Milaxy Yanet Sánchez Armas =

Cuban politician

2nd Governor of Villa Clara Province
- Incumbent
- Assumed office 2 February 2024
- Vice Governor: Noel Cecilio Chinea Pérez
- Preceded by: Alberto López Díaz

1st Vice-Governor of Villa Clara Province
- In office 8 February 2020 – 2 February 2024
- Governor: Alberto López Díaz
- Succeeded by: Noel Cecilio Chinea Pérez

Personal details
- Born: May 10, 1972 (age 54)
- Citizenship: Cuba
- Party: PCC
- Other political affiliations: CDR; CTC; FMC

Milaxy Yanet Sánchez Armas is a Cuban politician and the governor of Villa Clara Province. She succeeded as governor from Alberto López Díaz, on 2 February 2024, when he took over the position of the Minister of Food Industry of Cuba, and she was the vice-governor of the province.

== Early life ==
Sánchez Armas is originally from Ranchuelo, being a ‘guajira’ (roughly translating to women from a rural area), where she spent most of her early political and non-political career in.

== Education ==
Milaxy has a diploma in public administration and management, and is currently working on a special of Public administration.

== Career ==
=== Before politics ===
Milaxy started off in 1996 as a community service and training technician in irrigation and drainage of Ifraín Alfonso, Ranchuelo, and later was transferred to the OEE of public food of the municipality of Ranchuelo. She became the vice-director of food services of the Empresa municipal de Comercio de Ranchuelo (Trade company of Ranchuelo).

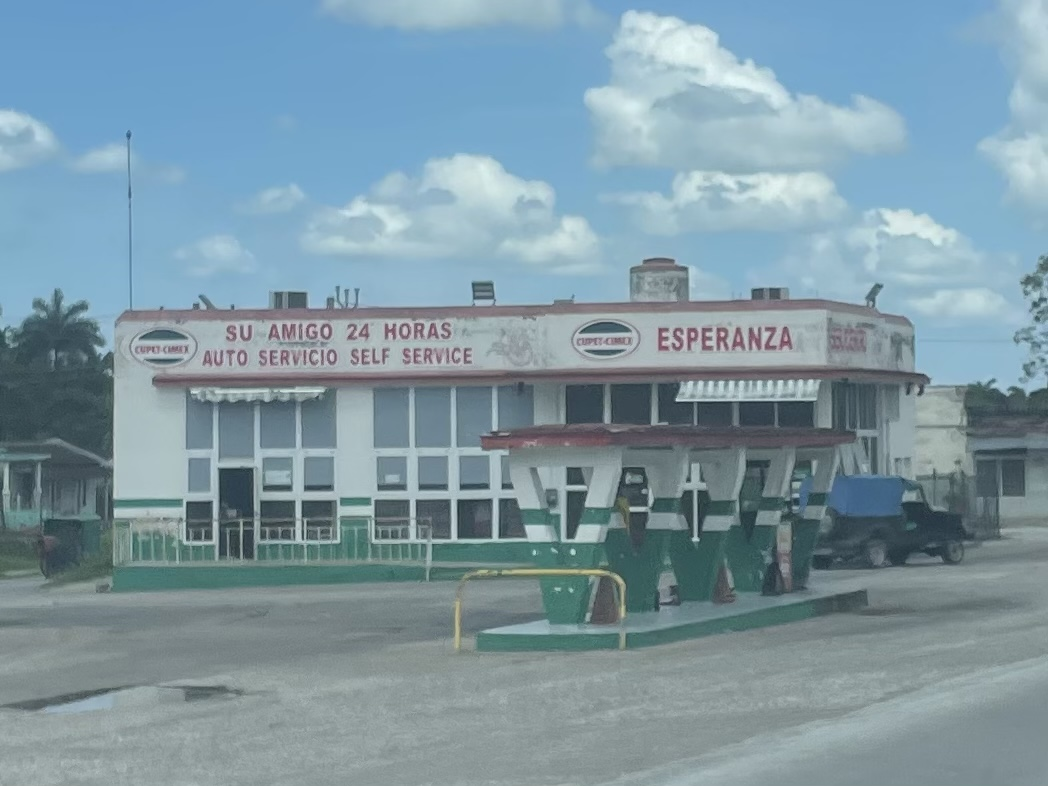
Gas station which she managed in Esperanza, Ranchuelo

In 2007, she went to the Empresa Provincial de Servicios Especiales (Provincial Company of Special Services) of Villa Clara Province, and in the same year also served as the manager of the ServiCupet gas station of Esperanza, Ranchuelo.

=== Local and municipal politics ===
In 2010, she was appointed as the vice-president of the municipal administration council of Ranchuelo, until 2015 when she was elected vice-president of the Municipal Assembly of People’s Power, and later also became the president.

From 2015 to 2021 she was the president of her local CDR.

=== Provincial politics ===
In 2019, she was appointed vice-president of the provincial administration council of Villa Clara Province. She was elected as vice-governor of the province in January 2020, receiving 98.47 percent of the vote.

She held immediate reserve to become the governor, which happened on 2 February 2024 when Alberto López Díaz got promoted to head of the MINAL, where Milaxy is now the current governor of the province. She was re-elected as governor of the province in May 2024 with a 98.10 percent of the vote.

In May 2025, Sánchez Armas inaugurated a 6.5 W solar panel system at the national office of ONURE in the province,, part of the plan of the national electrical power system and promoting renewable source energy and use more clean energy for the future.

== Personal life ==
Sánchez has two sons, and one grandson.
