= Rubén Cedeño =

Venezuelan musician (born 1952)

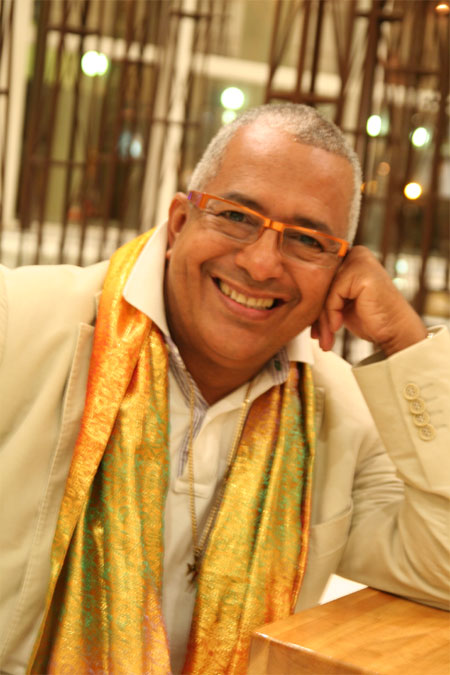
- Rubén Cedeño
- Born: 21 May 1952 Caracas, Venezuela
- Occupation: Composer, writer, lyric singer, painter, lecturer

Rubén Cedeño (born 21 May 1952 in Caracas), is a Venezuelan musician, composer, painter, writer and speaker on metaphysical subjects.

== Life and career ==
He was a disciple of Conny Méndez, who in 1946 founded the Metaphysical Teachings in Venezuela. He was one of her students and they had a very close relationship based on the teachings and their friendship as well.

Rubén Cedeño has been writing and speaking publicly on Metaphysics for many years and as a result of his efforts, he founded or inspired the foundation of metaphysical groups in Argentina, Venezuela, Colombia, Chile, Uruguay, Paraguay, Ecuador, Bolivia, El Salvador, Peru, Mexico, Panama, United States, Spain, Italy, France, Belgium and Switzerland. He wrote more than 300 books, some of which have been translated to English, Italian, French and Portuguese and hold a place in many national libraries, such as Library of Alexandria, Egypt, Library of the Congress (United States), National Library of Spain, Jewish National and University Library, National Library of Italy. His core message can be summarized in positive thinking, self-knowledge, the Inner Christ, the Seven Aspects of God, forgiveness practice and compassionate love. Rubén Cedeño holds a place in the Encyclopedic Music of Venezuela and he is among the most famous musicians of Venezuela. He graduated from the Conservatory of Music "Juan Manuel Olivares" in Caracas, Venezuela as a professor of singing. In Hungary, he specialized in Kodaly method and composed the Hungarian merengue "Having Chereznye Palinka". As composer of folk and infantile music the most recognized works are: The Aguinaldo Que Navidad part of the Venezuelan Christmas repertoire and interpreted by the mezzo-soprano Morella Muñoz, Cantata infantil Simón Bolívar, Misa de Mi Tierra among others. It was National Prize of popular music of the INAVI with his valse Nora. The hymn Hail to the Statue of Liberty, received the congratulation of President Ronald Reagan.
