= Chone River =

River of Ecuador

Chone River Río de Chone
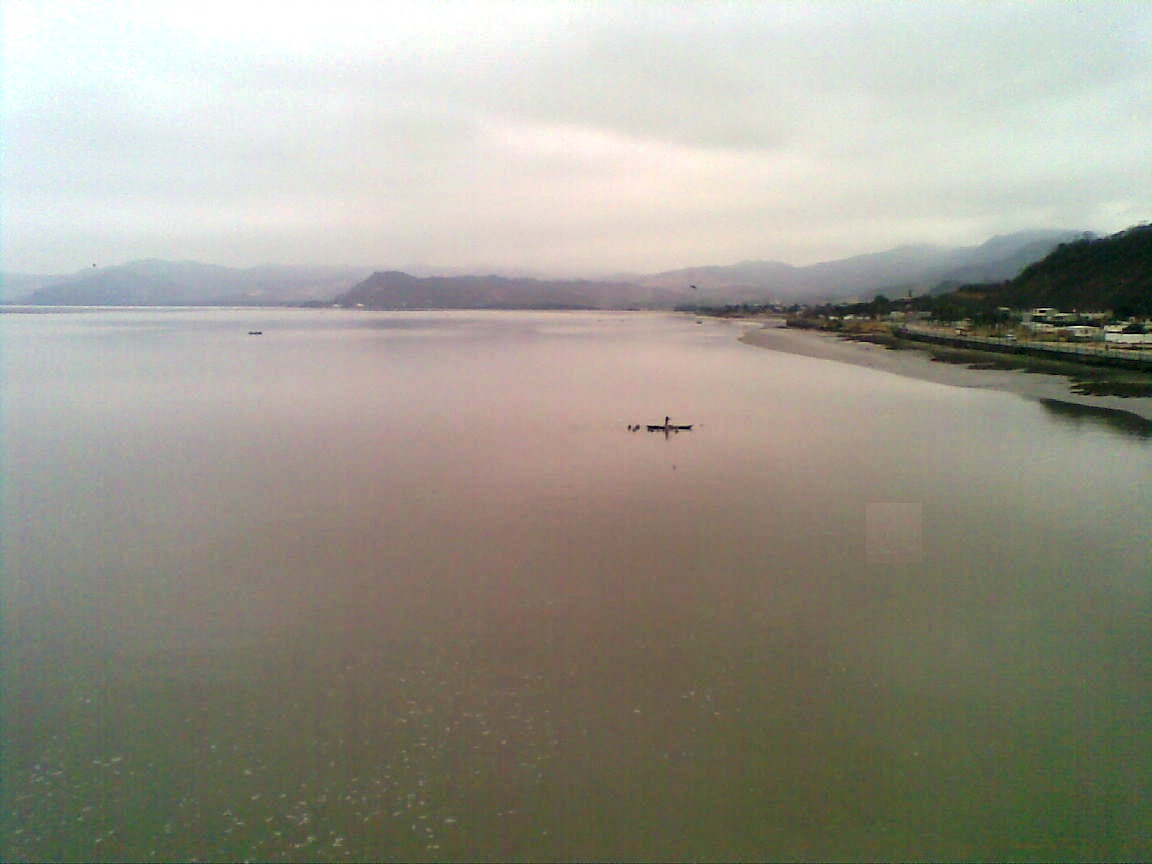
- Mouth of the Chone River looking east from the city of Bahía de Caráquez

- Location of mouth
- Native name: Chuni mayu

Location
- Country: Ecuador
- Province: Manabí

Physical characteristics
- Source
  - location: Ecuador
  - coordinates: 00°32′S 79°58′W
  - elevation: 400 m (1,300 ft)
- Mouth: Bahía de Caráquez
  - location: Pacific Ocean, Ecuador
  - coordinates: 0°35′14″S 080°25′07″W
  - elevation: 0 m (0 ft)
- Basin size: 2,384 km^{2} (920 sq mi)
- Discharge
  - location: mouth
  - average: 53 m^{3}/s (1,900 cu ft/s)

The Chone River is a river of Ecuador situated in the Manabí Province. The river is sourced from the mountains and flows into the Bahía de Caráquez (Bay of Caráquez) in the Pacific Ocean, near the town of Bahía de Caráquez.

== Dams ==
The large Esperanza Dam (Represa de Esperanza) was completed on the Chone in 1985. It does not have any hydroelectric power component, but was constructed solely for irrigation and flood control.

== See also ==
- Isla Corazón
- List of rivers of Ecuador
