= Dario Cedeño =

Ecuadorian footballer (born 1991)

Personal information
- Full name: Dario Javier Cedeño Ibarra
- Date of birth: August 20, 1991 (age 35)
- Place of birth: Chone, Ecuador
- Position: Defender

Team information
- Current team: Barcelona

Youth career
- 2008 – 2010: Barcelona

Senior career*
Years	Team	Apps	(Gls)
2010–	Barcelona	2	(0)
- * Club domestic league appearances and goals as of 18 August 2010

Dario Cedeño (born August 20, 1991 in Chone) is an Ecuadorian football defender currently playing for Barcelona.

== See also ==
- Football in Ecuador
