= Sedan, Montana =

- Census-designated place
- Location within Montana Location within the United States
- Coordinates: 45°58′48″N 110°52′46″W
- Country: United States
- State: Montana
- County: Gallatin

Area
  - Total: 61.06 sq mi (158.15 km^{2})
  - Land: 60.99 sq mi (157.96 km^{2})
  - Water: 0.073 sq mi (0.19 km^{2})
- Elevation: 5,666 ft (1,727 m)

Population (2020)
  - Total: 101
  - Density: 1.7/sq mi (0.64/km^{2})
- Time zone: UTC-7 (Mountain (MST))
  - Summer (DST): UTC-6 (MDT)
- Area code: 406
- FIPS code: 30-67075
- GNIS feature ID: 2583844

Sedan is a census-designated place (CDP) in Gallatin County, Montana, United States. As of the 2020 census, Sedan had a population of 101. It is located on Montana Highway 86, 27 miles from Bozeman. The Zip Code is 59086.

== Climate ==
This climatic region is typified by large seasonal temperature differences, with warm to hot (and often humid) summers and cold (sometimes severely cold) winters. According to the Köppen Climate Classification system, Sedan has a humid continental climate, abbreviated "Dfb" on climate maps.

== Demographics ==
Historical population
Census	Pop.	Note	%±
2020	101		—
U.S. Decennial Census

== Education ==
It is in Shields Valley Elementary School District and the Bozeman High School District. The high school district is a part of Bozeman Public Schools.
