= Carlos Manuel de Céspedes Airport =

Regional airport serving Bayamo, Cuba

Carlos Manuel de Céspedes Airport Aeropuerto Carlos Manuel de Céspedes
- IATA: BYM; ICAO: MUBY

Summary
- Airport type: Public
- Operator: Government
- Serves: Bayamo, Cuba
- Elevation AMSL: 62 m / 203 ft
- Coordinates: 20°23′47″N 076°37′17″W

Map
- Location in Cuba

Runways
Direction	Length		Surface
Direction	m	ft	Surface
07/25	2,099	6,886	Asphalt
- Source: Aerodrome chart

Carlos Manuel de Céspedes Airport (IATA: BYM, ICAO: MUBY) is a regional airport serving the city of Bayamo in the Granma Province of Cuba. It is named for Carlos Manuel de Céspedes.
