= Marco Cedano =

- Born: May 9, 1951 (age 75); Hermosillo, Sonora, Mexico
- Occupation: Master Distiller
- Known for: Tequila Tromba

Marco Cedano (born 9 May 1951) is a Mexican master distiller and tequila entrepreneur. He is known for being the co-inventor of Tequila Tromba.

== Career ==
Just out of school, at age 23, Cedano started working as an engineer in tequila production at Tres Magueyes, a company founded by Don Julio Gonzalez. After working there for 2 years, Cedano quit the job and pursued other engineering jobs in the mining and chemical industries. In 1983, Cedano returned to Don Julio to work as an engineer, where he was subsequently promoted to Master Distiller and Distillery Manager of Tequila. During this time, Cedano was responsible for distilling and operations in the factory. In 1999, Cedano left the company after Seagrams purchased it. For next 11 years, he was involved in large-scale projects, which included building the first Agave Nectar factory and the first commercial Mezcal factory.

== Tequila Tromba ==
In 2010, Cedano founded his first independent brand, Tequila Tromba, in partnership with Canadian Eric Brass and Australians Nick Reid and James Sherry. Cedano works with his son Rodrigo Cedano, as well.

The brand is currently selling premium tequilas in Canada and Australia, with recent expansion into the United States, and national distribution throughout Mexico. At the 2012 Ultimate Spirits Challenge in the United States, Tequila Tromba scored 93 points in the Blanco, 100%-Agave-Tequilla category, just one point behind the winner, Chairman’s Trophy. Tequilla Tromba was the only independent label named as a finalist. According to the Guinness Book of World Records, Tequila Tromba holds the record for the world’s largest Tequila Tasting. Cedano is the author of the book Making Tequila: Art and Technology.

== See also ==
Official website
