= Bahía de Caráquez =

- City
- La Villa de San Antonio de Caráquez
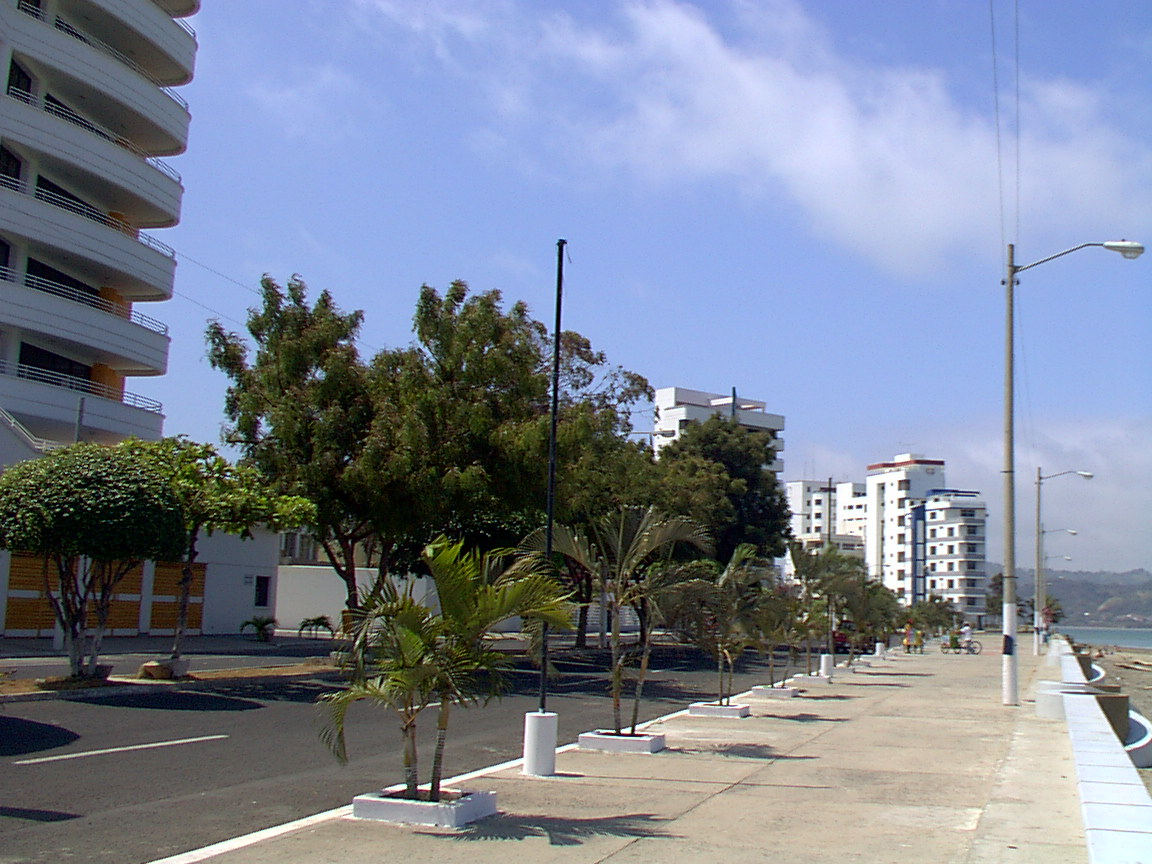

- Location within Ecuador
- Coordinates: 0.59953°S 80.42449°W
- Country: Ecuador
- Province: Manabí
- Canton: Sucre Canton
- Founded: March 1628
- Founded by: José de Larrazábal

Government
  - Mayor: Carlos Mendoza

Area
  - City: 15.07 km^{2} (5.82 sq mi)

Population (2022 census)
  - City: 22,209
  - Density: 1,474/km^{2} (3,817/sq mi)
- Time zone: UTC−5 (ECT)
- Climate: BSh
- Website: www.bahiadecaraquez.com

Bahía de Caráquez, officially known as San Antonio de Caraquez and founded under the name of Villa de San Antonio de la Bahía de Caráquez or simply known today as Bahía, formerly called Bahía de los Caras during the period of the Spanish conquest, is a coastal city belonging to the Sucre county, in the Ecuadorian province of Manabí. The city is located on a sandy peninsula on the country's western coast at the mouth of the Río Chone and has considerable tourism infrastructure that positions it as the main regional town. It has seen significant development during the last 15 to 20 years, particularly because it has become a vacation destination for people from Quito and Guayaquil. The city is located one hour north of the city of Manta and in the pre-Columbian era was host to the ancient Indian city of Caran. Across the bay is the town of San Vicente.

Bahía became an Ecocity on February 23, 1999, due to the devastation caused by two natural disasters in 1997 and 1998.

Across the Rio Chone is the city of San Vicente. Locals cross the river by bridge and boat. The bridge was completed as of November 2010. Bahia differs greatly from the neighboring San Vicente. The city is a popular tourist destination for the wealthy.

The city also boasts a well-known archeological museum, which displays artifacts found in Manabi from very different periods. The collection includes statues from the Valdivia culture as well as several other lesser-known historical communities.

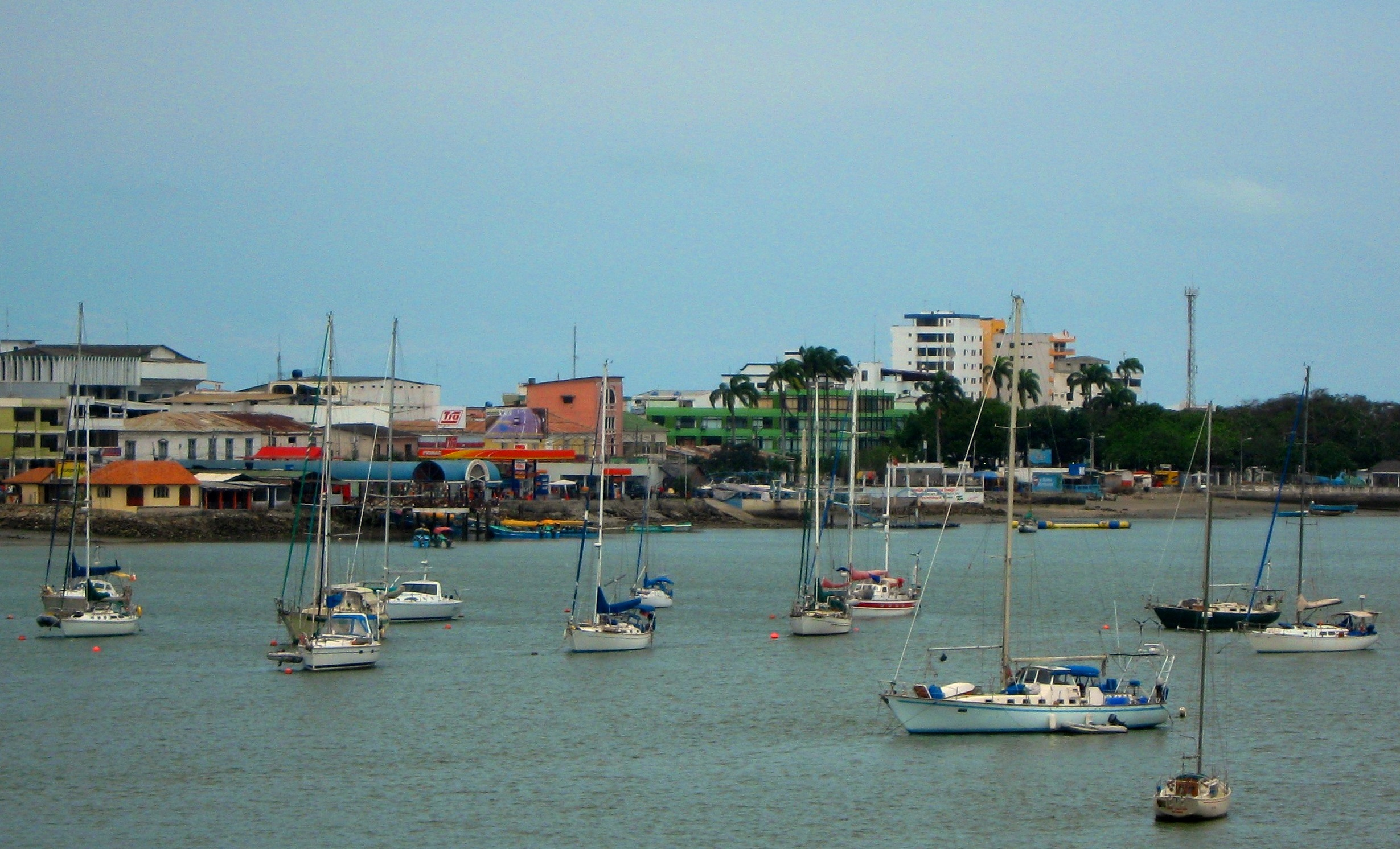
View of the city of Bahía de Caráquez from the "Los Caras" bridge.

== Colonial era ==
The city was founded on the sea, settled permanently in the current bay in March 1628 with the official name of Villa de San Antonio de la Bahía de Caráquez by Jose de Larrazabal during the reign of Philip IV of Spain, by order of the President of the Royal Audience of Quito, Doctor Antonio de Morga.

Also from the late sixteenth century at the time of the Spanish conquest until the middle of the seventeenth century it constituted a trade route covering the Panama–Quito axis, and consolidated the most important contact between the ports of Pacific South America and Central America, but the splendor of this monopoly was dismantled in 1629 when, from the city of Los Reyes, the viceroys of Peru at the time, took decisions in favor of the Santiago de Guayaquil port and shipyard, their elite merchant having found themselves engaged in the enrichment and centrality of the Spanish crown that was to endure severe currency crisis, for which reason they even deliberately banned free enterprise at the Indian ports with European vessels other than Spanish.

The Spanish naval companies had to disclose the reduction of ports to avoid leakage of silver and food consumed in the Iberian Peninsula, in addition to reducing costs and bureaucratic positions necessary to save their skins from the coffers of the Austrias minors.

== Population ==
Bahía de Caráquez has a population of 22,209, made up mostly of mestizos and people of Spanish descent. In the early twentieth century there was much immigration of Italian and Lebanese families who left descendants in this town. Its location on the coast, makes Bahía one of the main tourist centers of the province of Manabi.

== Economy ==
Although Bahía is a city with great tourist potential, its main economic activity is the breeding and fattening of shrimp in captivity. In the bay or estuary of the Chone River there are about 6,000 hectares of cultivated pools of this crustacean. The local industry is very new, there is only one processing plant and exporter of frozen shrimp, Empacadora Dufer, an ice factory and a purified drinking water factory. In rural areas of the parish of Leónidas Plaza, farms or ranches are engaged in raising cattle and pigs. Around a dozen poultry farms, with egg laying hens can also be found.

== Transportation routes ==
Caráquez Bay consists of access by land at the confluence of roads coming from Quito and Guayaquil. In San Vicente, there is an airport with a paved runway of 1900 meters and a road that connects the province of Esmeraldas. On November 3, 2010, the "Los Caras" bridge was opened, linking San Vicente with Bahía, resulting in the completion of the Spondylus Route.

== Climate ==
Climate data for Bahía de Caráquez, elevation 3 m (9.8 ft), (1971–2000)
Month	Jan	Feb	Mar	Apr	May	Jun	Jul	Aug	Sep	Oct	Nov	Dec	Year
Mean daily maximum °C (°F)	28.7 (83.7)	29.6 (85.3)	30.0 (86.0)	30.1 (86.2)	28.7 (83.7)	27.2 (81.0)	26.5 (79.7)	26.1 (79.0)	26.1 (79.0)	26.4 (79.5)	26.7 (80.1)	27.5 (81.5)	27.8 (82.1)
Mean daily minimum °C (°F)	22.9 (73.2)	23.2 (73.8)	23.2 (73.8)	23.2 (73.8)	22.9 (73.2)	21.8 (71.2)	21.3 (70.3)	21.0 (69.8)	21.1 (70.0)	21.4 (70.5)	21.4 (70.5)	22.3 (72.1)	22.1 (71.9)
Average precipitation mm (inches)	94.0 (3.70)	160.0 (6.30)	149.0 (5.87)	60.0 (2.36)	24.0 (0.94)	12.0 (0.47)	4.0 (0.16)	3.0 (0.12)	4.0 (0.16)	5.0 (0.20)	3.0 (0.12)	12.0 (0.47)	530 (20.87)
Average relative humidity (%)	80	82	83	81	82	84	84	84	83	82	82	80	82
Source: FAO
