= José Antonio Cedeño =

- Born: June 16, 1939 (age 85); Bayamo, Cuba

José Antonio Cedeño (born José Antonio Cedeño y Labout on June 16, 1939, in Bayamo, Oriente, Cuba) is a self-taught Cuban artist specializing in sculpture, drawing and painting.

During the 1950s, Cedeño was a professional in Aeronautical engineering and automotive mechanics in Havana. Since 1990, he has been a member of the National Union of Writers and Artists of Cuba (UNEAC).

His first individual exhibition, José Cedeño. Antillana de Acero, opened in 1971 in Havana, Cuba. He has also participated in a number of collaborative shows: the II Trienal de Arte Insito (Naif), in Bratislava, Slovakia (Czechoslovakia at the time), in 1969; the 11 Pintores Ingenuos de Cuba, at the Museo del Palacio de Bellas Artes, in Mexico City in 1976; the Artistas Populares de Cuba, at the Museo Nacional de Bellas Artes de La Habana in 1981; and the Inventario de Cosas Naturales. Pintores, Dibujantes y Escultores populares de Cuba, at the Centro de Desarrollo de las Artes Visuales, in Havana in 1990.

The principal collection of his work is at the Museo Nacional de Bellas Artes de La Habana, Havana.
