= CrossHarbor Capital Partners =

American investment firm, specializing in private equity

CrossHarbor Capital Partners, LLC
- Type: Private Partnership
- Industry: Financial services
- Founded: 1992; 34 years ago
- Founder: Samuel T. Byrne, William H. Kremer
- Headquarters: Boston, Massachusetts, U.S.
- Products: Private equity Real estate Mezzanine capital funds and Distressed securities
- AUM: US$5.5 billion
- Total assets: ▲US$ 1.1 billion (June 2011)
- Website: www.crossharborcapital.com

CrossHarbor Capital Partners is an American investment firm, specializing in private equity, based in Boston. CrossHarbor Capital Partners develops and manages private equity investment products in three principal business areas: real assets, distressed securities and mezzanine capital. CrossHarbor has assets under management of $5.5 billion diversified over a half dozen distinct funds. Its client base includes college endowments, state and large organization pension funds and high-net-worth individuals seeking lower fee, high potential opportunities to offset more traditional market investments.

== History ==
Prior to creating CrossHarbor, the firm's two founders, Sam Byrne and Bill Kremer, worked at FleetBoston Financial Group in the late 1980s and early 1990s. In 1991, Fleet acquired the Bank of New England which was under receivership by the FDIC. Byrne and Kremer managed the work-out of the Bank of New England's $500 million portfolio of non-performing real estate loans. In 1992, Byrne and Kremer founded Boston Capital Institutional Advisors and between 1992 and 2004 invested more than $5.5 billion in commercial real estate in more than 1,800 properties in 48 states. In 2004 the firm changed its name to CrossHarbor Capital Partners to reflect its broader regional investment portfolio and to avoid confusion with similarly named Boston financial services firms. In recent years CrossHarbor's management team has raised and managed a variety of real estate debt and equity programs in the form of discretionary funds and joint ventures and committed an additional $1.8 billion of equity capital across more than 140 transactions. In 2006, the firm raised CrossHarbor Institutional Partners, L.P., (CIP-I) a $540 million closed-end real estate fund.

== Investment focus ==
CrossHarbor specializes in alternative investments and distressed assets that mainstream investors typically avoid. Analysts’ reports reveal the firm maintains a focus on transitional, distressed and complex situations in the middle market. CrossHarbor has leveraged opportunities via managers with workout and asset management capabilities, to earn risk-adjusted returns across the capital structure by providing debt or equity to real estate assets that are transitional or experiencing distress at the asset or ownership level. CrossHarbor has found inefficiently priced real estate assets, offering downside protection through a low cost basis or senior position in the capital structure and upside potential through asset management initiatives or high yielding coupon payments. In recent years CrossHarbor has reported 15% to 20% IRR and a minimum 1.5x multiple on $2 billion in raised capital with some $8 billion in allocated investments.

== Investment funds ==
Between 1993 and 2011, CrossHarbor Capital's investment track record included nearly 150 transactions involving distressed real estate, leased assets, opportunistic debt and equity, mortgages, affordable housing and mezzanine financing. The CrossHarbor portfolio history includes:

- CrossHarbor Institutional Partners I (CIP-I) $540 million
- CrossHarbor Institutional Partners II (CIP-II) $750 million
- MassMutual/Boston Capital Mezzanine Fund I & II $500 million
- Special Program Investments $330 million
- Real Estate Income Fund I & II $160 million
- Separate Account Mortgages $40 million
- Affordable Housing Mortgage Fund $50 million
- Preferred Limited Partnership Investments $200 million

=== Real Estate Acquisitions & Sales ===
Following an aggressive multi-year period of acquisitions, the firm offered the largest single sale of a Massachusetts regional portfolio of commercial real estate ever in New England history, bundling 55 commercial properties, for $650 million in 2002. Other high-profile regional deals included the 2001 sale of 99 High Street in Boston for a $215 million – achieving a 27 percent return over the purchase price in 2000. Other deals included the 2004 sale of One Brattle Square in Cambridge, MA to Wells Real Estate Investment Trust for $68.6 million and the acquisition of the 42 acre former Digital Equipment Campus. CrossHarbor has acquired or made substantial investments in more than 150 commercial and residential developments across the United States and in 2011 expanded their focus to European markets supporting banks, insurers and investors at risk due to holdings in U.S. real estate markets.

==== Deutsche Bank (RREEF) Massachusetts Portfolio Sale ====
In 2005 CrossHarbor negotiated a commercial real estate portfolio sale of some 47 Massachusetts’ properties to a real estate investment arm of Deutsche Bank for between $510 million and $515 million. The deal included several downtown Boston and suburban office properties. The properties had been acquired by CrossHarbor in 1998.

==== Yellowstone Club, Big Sky, MT Acquisition ====
Between 2007 and 2009 CrossHarbor became the largest property owner and developer within the Big Sky, MT-based Yellowstone Club. In 2009 CrossHarbor made headlines as the successful stalking horse bidder for the bankrupt Yellowstone Club to protect the firm's extensive existing real estate investments in the Club. The Yellowstone Club, renowned for its list of billionaire membership list, emerged from bankruptcy protection in 2009 and has remained under CrossHarbor management with minority partner Discovery Land Company despite a series of lawsuits linked to the Club's former owners Edra and Tim Blixseth. After emerging from bankruptcy protection under CrossHarbor's ownership, the Yellowstone Club reported more than $100 million in new property and development sales.

==== Black Bull Run, Bozeman, MT Investment ====
In May 2011, CrossHarbor financed the acquisition of the Black Bull Run subdivision and golf resort west of Bozeman, MT following a 2010 Chapter 7 bankruptcy filing.. Black Bull is a private, members-only, golf course community on 484 acres of what used to be the Leachman Angus Ranch. The property includes an 18-hole golf course designed by former PGA tour member Tom Weiskopf and swim and tennis centers.

==== Viridian, Arlington, TX Financing ====
CrossHarbor provided significant financing capital with Huffines Communities in 2011 for the Viridian multi-use community development in Arlington, Texas. The development includes the Lakes of Arlington, the Lakes at Bird's Fort and a possible new home for the Dallas Cowboys. Development plans include $2 billion for residential, commercial, infrastructure, five lakes and 12 miles of recreational paths. With more than 5,000 residential units, 600,000 square feet of commercial and retail space planned, Viridian has been characterized as one of the largest proposed new development investment risks following the U.S. real estate market declines of 2009-2010.

==== Spanish Peaks, Moonlight Basin and Big Sky Resorts Consolidation ====
In July 2013 CrossHarbor, in partnership with Big Sky ski area owner Boyne Resorts, was the winning bidder for the 5,700-acre Spanish Peaks private residential community adjacent to the Yellowstone Club. A bankruptcy judge approved their offer of $26.1 million for the resort which had filed for Chapter 7 bankruptcy protection in 2011. Following the Spanish Peaks acquisition, CrossHarbor and Boyne announced in August 2013 their intention to purchase the also neighboring and bankruptcy-troubled Moonlight Basin ski area for an undisclosed amount. The newly combined Big Sky Resort, Yellowstone Club and Moonlight Basin properties created the largest ski area in the United States with more than 5,700 acres of skiable terrain and nearly 28,000 acres of resort development in Montana's Big Sky region.

== See also ==
- Yellowstone Club
