= Crail Ranch Buildings =

- U.S. National Register of Historic Places
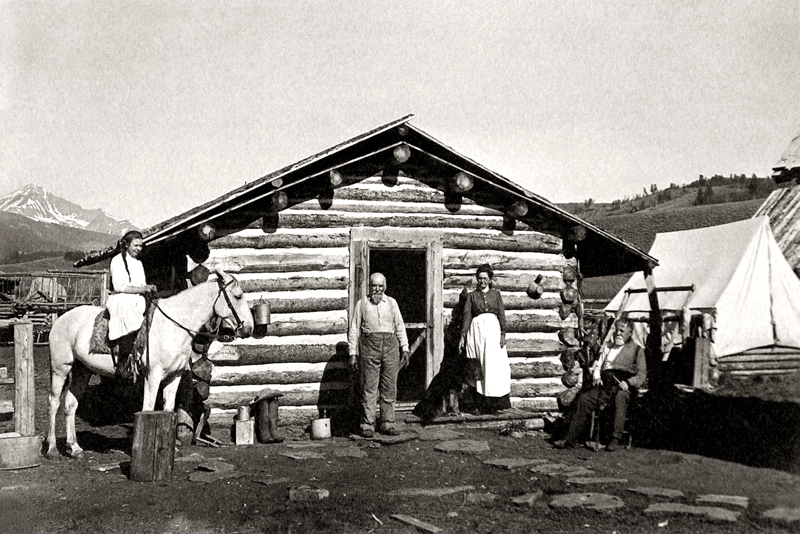
- Crail homestead, original one room cabin in 1910 (Historic Crail Ranch archives)
- Location: Big Sky, Gallatin County, Montana
- Coordinates: 45.26954°N 111.29575°W
- Built: 1902 - 1910
- Architect: Frank Crail and Family
- NRHP reference No.: 82003167
- Added to NRHP: April 15, 1982

The Historic Crail Ranch Buildings listed in the National Register of Historic Places are two rustic cabins, the remnants of a homestead dating to the late 1890s in Gallatin County, Montana in the area now known as Big Sky. The historic cabins are part of the Crail Ranch Homestead Museum, which depicts the homestead era in Big Sky from about 1896 to 1970 through displays of objects, photographs and documents on loan from a descendant of the original homesteaders.

== Early Days ==
The Crail Ranch was established as a homestead beginning in 1902 by Augustus Franklin "Frank" Crail (1842 - 1924) and his family.

Frank Crail was born in November 1842, the second son of a farming family in Tipton County, Indiana. In 1865, at the age of twenty-two, Crail traveled alone to the Missouri frontier and joined a wagon train heading to the Montana Territory. By 1868, he was working in a quartz mine near Helena, Montana.

Finding mining not to his liking, and finding freight hauling through Indian country too dangerous, Crail turned to homesteading based on the Homestead Act of 1862. In 1871, Crail partnered with two other ranchers and developed a homestead parcel in the Bridger Mountains, just north of the town of Bozeman in Gallatin County, Montana. Some of the original cabins and out buildings that Crail built on that land are still in existence.

In 1886, at age 44, Frank Crail met and married Sallie Lorrie Creek, age 22, who had come to Montana with her family from Platte County, Missouri in about 1884. Frank and Sallie had three children - Eugene (1887-1985), Emmett (1888-1975) and Lilian (1896-1981). By 1896, Crail had left off farming and was serving as clerk of the Montana District Court for the Ninth District in Bozeman.

In December 1901, following an election in which he lost his clerkship, Crail purchased for $150 rights to a 160-acre homestead parcel in the meadow area in the Gallatin Basin above Gallatin Canyon, and now the location of the Big Sky, Montana resort. In the spring of 1902, when nearly 60 years of age, Crail brought his family up the rough logging road along the Gallatin River and moved into a small cabin left by the previous developer of the parcel.

== Homestead and Ranch 1902 - 1968 ==
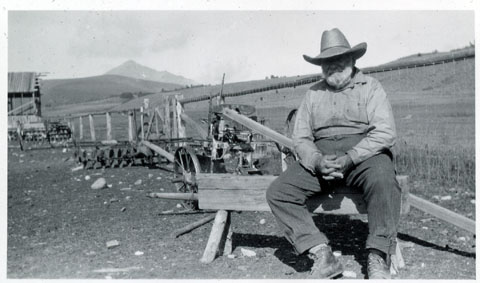
Frank Crail on his ranch about 1920 (Historic Crail Ranch Archives)

Beginning in 1902, Frank Crail and his family proved up their original 160 acre homestead and acquired five additional parcels, expanding their holdings to 960 contiguous acres. By 1910, they had completed a two-story, four-room cabin and added numerous barns and outbuildings on the property. The family raised horses, cattle and sheep and had a large hay-cutting operation for animal feed. Crail also experimented with a strain of winter wheat designed to grow in the high country of the American West. He called his wheat "Crail Fife," perhaps in reference to his family's origins in Crail in the East Neuk of Fife in Scotland. Crail marketed his wheat to growers in Montana and Colorado. Samples of Crail's wheat were entered by the State of Montana in the 1904 Louisiana Purchase Exposition in St Louis, and won prizes.

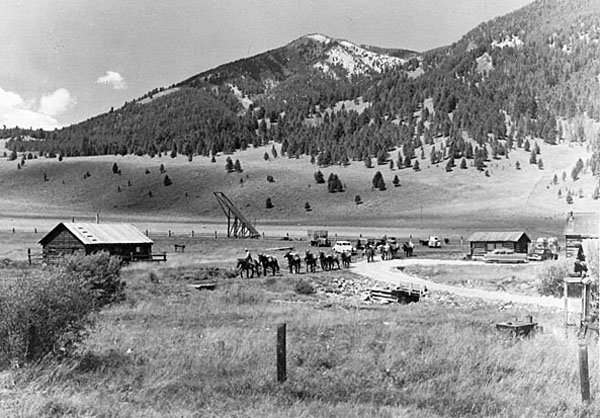
Pack train leaving Crail Ranch in about 1955 (Historic Crail Ranch archives)

In September 1914, Sallie Creek Crail died at age 50. In 1918, Frank's oldest son, Eugene went off to World War I. About this same time, Crail's daughter Lillian left Montana for nursing school in Chicago. She did not live on the ranch after that point. Augustus Franklin Crail died on his ranch in 1924. His son Emmett continued to operate the homestead as a working ranch through the 1920s, 1930s and 1940s . Finally, in 1950, after nearly 50 years on the ranch, Emmett Crail sold the property to a couple from California, Jack and Elaine Hume, who expanded the ranch to 1440 acres before selling the property to a cattleman named Sam Smeding in 1962.

== Coming of Big Sky Resort 1968 - 1980 ==
After the Crail Ranch property was sold by the Humes to Sam Smeding in 1962, the Crail Ranch lands were used as range for grazing cattle and the buildings were used only for storage. Then in 1968, retired newsman and Montana native Chet Huntley, along with a consortium of investors, began the process of creating the Big Sky Ski Resort. One of the first parcels purchased by Huntley's consortium were the Smeding properties, including the old Crail Ranch. From 1970 to 1980, the resort consortium removed many of the ranch buildings, converted meadows and hay fields to the Big Sky golf course, and used the original small cabin and the larger four-room main cabin as bunkhouses for workers.

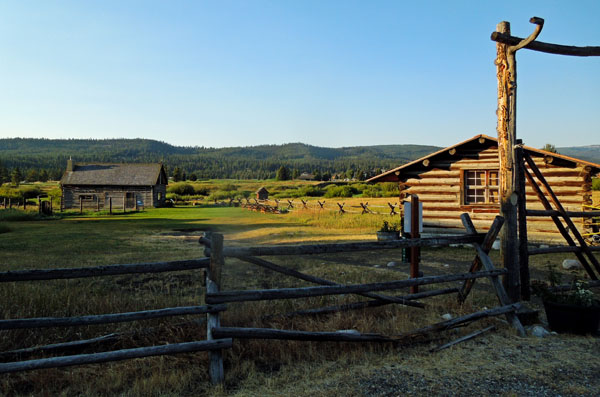
Crail Ranch Buildings in 2016

== Crail Ranch Becomes Historic 1980 - Present ==
In about 1980, after the Big Sky Resort finished using the Crail cabins, interested local groups persuaded the resort to cede a one-acre parcel containing the two Crail cabins to the Big Sky Owner's Association. In 1982, through the efforts of the Gallatin Canyon Historical Society, the Crail Ranch buildings were listed in the National Register of Historic Places. Later in the 1980s and through the 1990s, the Gallatin Canyon Women's Club took an active role in cleaning the cabins and preparing the property for visitors, and the grounds and the main cabin were opened to the public in July 2001. Shortly thereafter, the Big Sky Community Organization, a 501(c) non-profit group, took control of the buildings from the Big Sky Owner's Association and, in 2006, established a formal conservators group, the Historic Crail Ranch Conservators. In October 2012, in response to community interest in a museum, the Conservators registered the name Crail Ranch Homestead Museum. The museum is located off Spotted Elk Road in Big Sky. The grounds are open year round; the buildings are open on weekends from late June until mid-September. The Museum also offers Codex digital galleries displaying and explaining many of the museum's holdings.
