= Yellowstone Club =

Private club and resort in Montana

The Yellowstone Club is a private residential club, ski resort, and golf resort located in Madison County, just west of Big Sky, Montana.

== History ==
Real estate developer Tim Blixseth purchased approximately 100,000 acres (400 sq km) of timberland, partly in purchases from Plum Creek Timber and engaged in swaps of land with the U.S. Forest Service and the Federal Government ("Gallatin Land Exchanges"). This land swap process was enabled by two specialized acts of Congress in the 1990s. Blixseth ultimately ended up with a large amount of developable land adjacent to the Big Sky Resort in Montana. The Yellowstone Club private ski and golf community was developed by Blixseth and used as collateral for a $375 million syndicated loan where the proceeds were used for other purposes, including an effort to build an exclusive luxury vacation club based on acquiring resort properties around the world. This venture failed, Mr. Blixseth and his wife divorced and the Yellowstone Club entered bankruptcy in November 2008.

During its peak season, almost 650 people are employed at the club.

The club was featured on CNBC's lifestyle show High Net Worth with Tyler Mathisen.

Cyclist Greg LeMond, an early investor and homeowner/member, sued the club in 2006, saying club founder Tim Blixseth and his former wife Edra Denise (Crocker) Blixseth had borrowed $375 million from Credit Suisse Group and took $209 million for themselves as a dividend, jilting him and other investors. The suit was settled in 2008 for $39.5 million. Ms. Blixseth eventually agreed to pay Mr. LeMond and others a $21.5 million settlement; she paid only $8 million of that amount and Mr. LeMond and others joined the group of her creditors in her personal bankruptcy.

The Yellowstone Club is one of several developments that has been the subject of litigation between investors and Credit Suisse. The investors have accused Credit Suisse of fraudulently inflating the value of the developments in order to generate higher fees for itself.

=== 2008-2009 bankruptcy protection ===
On November 10, 2008, in the midst of the Great Recession, the Yellowstone Club filed for Chapter 11 bankruptcy protection. It emerged from protection under new ownership on July 19, 2009. When filing, the Club's prior owners owed US$343 million to creditors.

In June 2009 Edra Blixseth spoke to a reporter for The New York Times about her and her ex-husband's business affairs from Porcupine Creek, her 30,000-square-foot (2,800 m^{2}) estate in Rancho Mirage, California. She said she had hoped to retain the Club and her various estates and make Porcupine Creek income-producing with its 240-acre (0.97 km^{2}) private golf course. However, Porcupine Creek was sold to Larry Ellison in 2011 for $42.9 million by creditors who also sold the Blixseth's Chateau de Farcheville in France and other assets.

In June 2009, as part of the bankruptcy resolution, the Yellowstone Club was sold for $115 million to a private equity firm, CrossHarbor Capital Partners, a firm led by a Yellowstone Club member, Sam Byrne. Prior to the bankruptcy and disclosure of the Credit Suisse-Blixseth loan details, negotiations with that same buyer had put a $400 million price tag on the club. In the 2009 bankruptcy transaction, Byrne also "invested $75 million above the purchase price in repairs and set aside an additional $15 million to pay the club’s creditors," according to the Times. The deal was brokered by Jeff Woolson, Managing Director of the CBRE Golf & Resort Properties Group, and Steve Lehr, Managing Director of CBRE's Land Services Group. CB Richard Ellis was selected by the U.S. Bankruptcy Court to market the property because of the firm's successful track record handling complicated transactions.

In November 2010 some parts of the bankruptcy reorganization were appealed by former owner Tim Blixseth, particularly those concerning the settlement with Credit Suisse and aspects of the bankruptcy allowing creditors to pursue Blixseth for "hundreds of millions" they claim he siphoned from the Club for his personal use. In 2012 Blixseth's appeals were dismissed by the U.S. Court of Appeals, 9th Circuit.

=== Post bankruptcy history ===
According to press reports, as of late 2014 the Yellowstone Club had no remaining debt from the bankruptcy, had positive cash flow, and had doubled its membership to more than 500 households. In late 2013 CrossHarbor partnered with Boyne Resorts, the owners of neighboring Big Sky Resort, and paid $26 million to acquire a nearby real estate project, Spanish Peaks, a 5,700 acre development in bankruptcy. Shortly thereafter CrossHarbor and Big Sky Resort jointly acquired the bankrupt Moonlight Basin ski club and began consolidation of the newly acquired ski terrain with that of Big Sky Resort. Hart Howerton is working with CrossHarbor on the master planning of their entire 25,000 acre landholding, as well as architectural design of the Yellowstone Club Village Core and Spanish Peaks Lodge.

=== Location and ski mountain ===
Most of the ski runs are on Pioneer Mountain (45°13′52.98″N 111°27′4.52″W). Pioneer Mountain has a summit elevation of 9,859 feet (3,005 m).

The Yellowstone Club resort has several lifts and ski runs that tie it directly into Big Sky Resort's lift system. The Big Sky ski area and the Yellowstone Club share a five-mile border. The ski resorts are surrounded by 250,000 acres of the Gallatin National Forest.

Snowfall averages approximately 300 inches a year and is very consistent from year to year and week to week. Although it is one of the few western ski resorts located east of the continental divide, the area receives consistent light snows. The club's tagline is "Private Powder" and this is made possible by frequent snows and low skier traffic.

The ski terrain is extensive and varied and compares favorably with other well known ski resorts. Pioneer Ridge has numerous "double black" expert runs and challenging chutes. The west side of Pioneer Mountain is a vast forest for tree skiing. Lower Pioneer Mountain and Andesite Mountain are dotted with high speed chairlifts and mainly intermediate ski runs. The mountain has 2200 acres for skiing.

The club also features cross country skiing, ice skating and numerous indoor activities. Many additional recreational opportunities are available in summer including golf, climbing, mountain biking, kayaking, and fly fishing.

== Notable members ==
- Bill Gates
- Mark Zuckerberg
- Eric Schmidt
- Peter Chernin
- Steve Burke
- Dan Quayle
- Bill Frist
- Justin Timberlake and Jessica Biel
- Tom Brady and Gisele Bündchen
- Greg LeMond
- Hank Kashiwa
- Tom Weiskopf
- Michael Rea
- Melinda French Gates
- Ronald Burkle
- Stewart Butterfield & Jen Rubio
- Nick Woodman

== See also ==
- CrossHarbor Capital Partners – owners of Yellowstone Club
- Gallatin Gateway Inn – leased by the club
- Private ski area (North America)

== Bibliography ==
- "Economy Crashes the Gates at a Club for the Rich" New York Times, Nov. 29, 2008
- Yellowstone Club Financing Settled (For Now) Dec. 12, 2008, New West Development website
- Trustee Says Blixseth 'Doomed' Yellowstone Club Wall Street Journal - Bankruptcy Beat, Feb. 24, 2010,
- Developer seeks judge's ouster in Yellowstone Club bankruptcy case Nov. 22, 2010, Billings Gazette
