= Augustus Franklin Crail =

American/Montana pioneer (1842–1924)

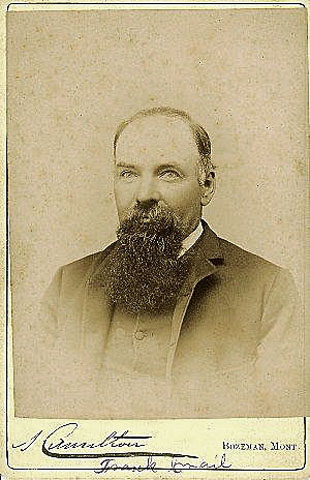
- Crail c. 1890
- Born: 18 November 1842; Tipton County, Indiana
- Died: 4 September 1924 (aged 81); Gallatin County, Montana
- Known for: Montana homesteader, developer of Crail Fife wheat, 2013 inductee in Montana Cowboy Hall of Fame

Augustus Franklin "Frank" Crail (18 November 1842 – 4 September 1924), was a Montana pioneer and homesteader, cattle rancher, developer of a unique strain of wheat, politician, and a 2013 Legacy Inductee into the Montana Cowboy Hall of Fame.

== Early years 1842–1900 ==
Crail was born in 1842, the second of four children of an Indiana farming family. Evidence from his later life shows that he acquired useful skills in raising wheat, sheep, cattle and horses, and that he also knew cabinetry. In 1865, at the age of twenty-three, Crail left Indiana, traveled alone to the Missouri frontier, and then traveled by wagon train to the Montana Territory. By 1868, he was working in a quartz mine near Helena, Montana.

Finding mining not to his liking, and finding freight hauling through Indian country too dangerous, Crail looked into the opportunities in homesteading based on the Homestead Act of 1862. In 1871, Crail partnered with two other ranchers and developed a homestead parcel in the Bridger Mountains, just north of the town of Bozeman in Gallatin County, Montana. Some of the original cabins and out buildings that Crail built on that land are still in existence.

In 1886, at age 44, Frank Crail met and married Sallie L. Creek, age 22, who had come to Bozeman with her family from Platte County, Missouri in about 1884. By 1896, Frank and Sallie had three children. Frank had left off farming and was serving as clerk of the Montana District Court for the Ninth District in Bozeman.

== Gallatin Basin homestead 1902–1924 ==
In December 1901, following an election in which he lost his clerkship, Crail purchased, for $150, rights to a 160-acre homestead parcel in the meadow area in the Gallatin Basin above Gallatin Canyon, and now the location of the Big Sky, Montana resort. In the spring of 1902, when nearly 60 years of age, Crail brought his family up the rough logging road along the Gallatin River and moved into a small cabin left by the previous developer of the parcel.

Beginning in 1902, Frank Crail and his family proved up their original 160 acres and over the years expanded their holdings to 960 contiguous acres. By 1910, they had completed a two-story, four-room cabin and added numerous barns and outbuildings on the property. In the early years, the family raised horses and cattle and had a large hay-cutting operation for animal feed. Later on, Crail also raised sheep in the West Fork of the Gallatin drainage area.

== Crail Fife Wheat ==
During this time, Crail began experimenting with a strain of winter wheat designed to grow in the high country of the American West. He called his wheat "Crail Fife," perhaps in reference to his family's origins in Crail in the East Neuk of Fife in Scotland. Crail actively marketed his winter wheat to growers in Montana and Colorado. In 1904, Crail Fife Wheat won two bronze medals at the Louisiana Purchase Exposition in St Louis. His wheat also caught the attention of the US Department of Agriculture in Minneapolis who wrote to him in August 1908, requesting information and samples.

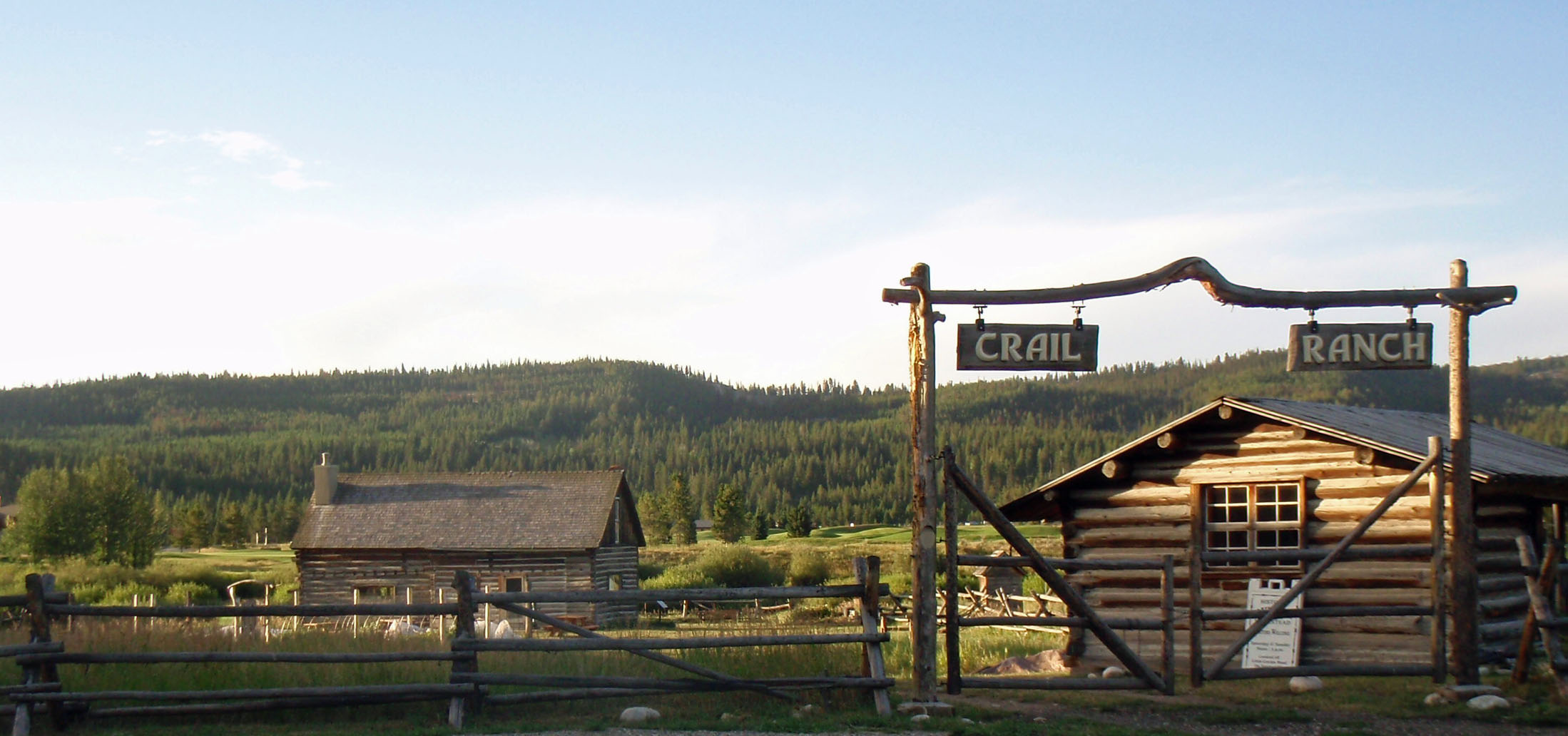
Historic Crail Ranch buildings (about 2010) are part of the Crail Ranch Homestead Museum, Big Sky, Montana

== Legacy ==
After Frank Crail died on the ranch in 1924, his son Emmett continued to operate the homestead as a working ranch until he finally sold it in 1950. Over the years, Frank Crail's homestead became known as the Crail Ranch. The original small cabin and the four-room main cabin still stand in the meadow after more than 120 years. They are listed as Crail Ranch Buildings in the National Register of Historic Places listings in Montana and they are incorporated into the Crail Ranch Homestead Museum in the Big Sky Resort area in Gallatin County Montana.
