= Soldiers Chapel =

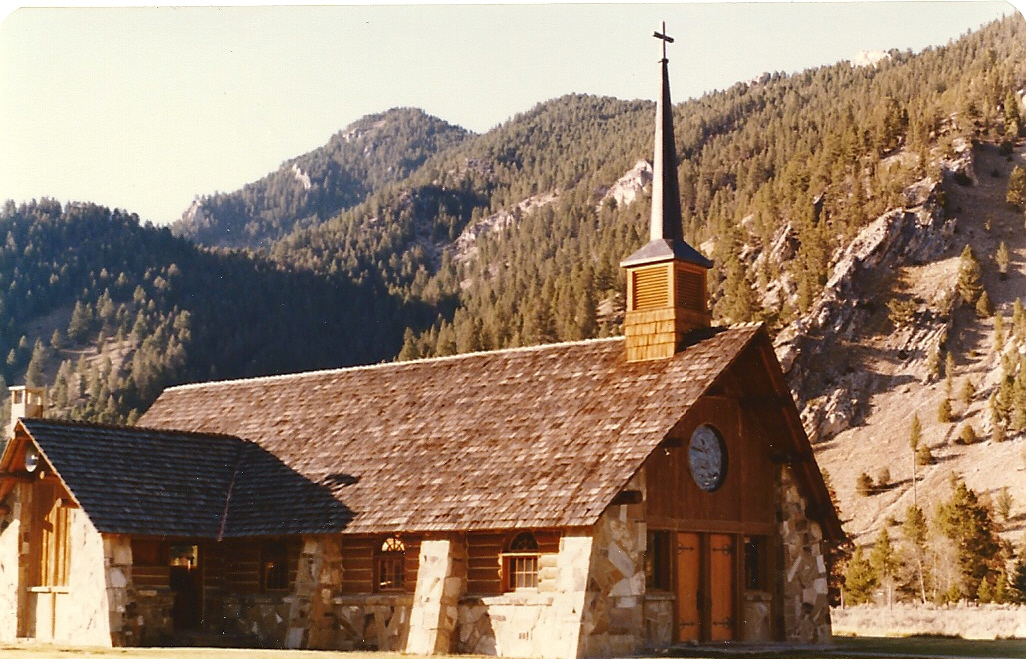
- Soldiers Chapel, Big Sky, Montana in October 1978
- Soldiers Chapel
- 45°15′50″N 111°15′23″W
- Location: 47875 Gallatin Road (US 191, mile marker 48), Big Sky, Montana, USA

Architecture
- Completed: 1955

Specifications
- Materials: Stone and wood

Soldiers Chapel is a non-denominational Christian memorial chapel in Big Sky, Gallatin County, Montana, USA, dedicated in 1955 by the Nelson Story family in tribute to a fallen family member of the 163rd Infantry Regiment. The regiment was part of the Montana National Guard during World War II. Open daily from Memorial Day through Labor Day, with services at 11 a.m. on Sundays, the chapel is popular for special events such as weddings. The chapel is at an elevation of 6,017 feet (1,834 m).

== History ==
The 163rd Infantry Regiment was sent to New Guinea in early 1942 to help prevent the Japanese from invading Australia. One of the regiment's major combat actions was the Battle of Buna-Gona. In addition to deaths and wounds from combat, diseases such as malaria, dengue fever, scrub typhus, and blackwater fever were a major concern. Virtually every member of the unit eventually caught a jungle disease, was wounded, or died.

One of the officers in the regiment was Colonel Nelson Story, III, a resident of Bozeman, Montana, and descendant of Nelson Story, a noted Montana pioneer and land benefactor of Montana State University – Bozeman. The colonel's son, Nelson Story, IV, died in combat early in the war. The colonel donated the land, drew the basic design, wrote the charter, and donated most of the money for the chapel. Soldiers Chapel is dedicated to both the regiment and to Nelson Story, IV. About twenty veterans of the regiment attended 50th anniversary celebrations of the chapel on 29 May 2005. A memorial plaque near the front door lists all the members of the regiment who died in the war. The plaque cites "Those immortal soldiers of the 163rd Infantry who, with courage and devotion, died in pain defending their country and the cause of freedom for all men." The stained glass, created by Associated Crafts-Willet-Hauser Architectural Glass of Winona, MN in the front door shows the hand of God reaching down to a wounded soldier on a tropical beach. The motif was designed by regimental veteran Sergeant Jack C. Gunter.

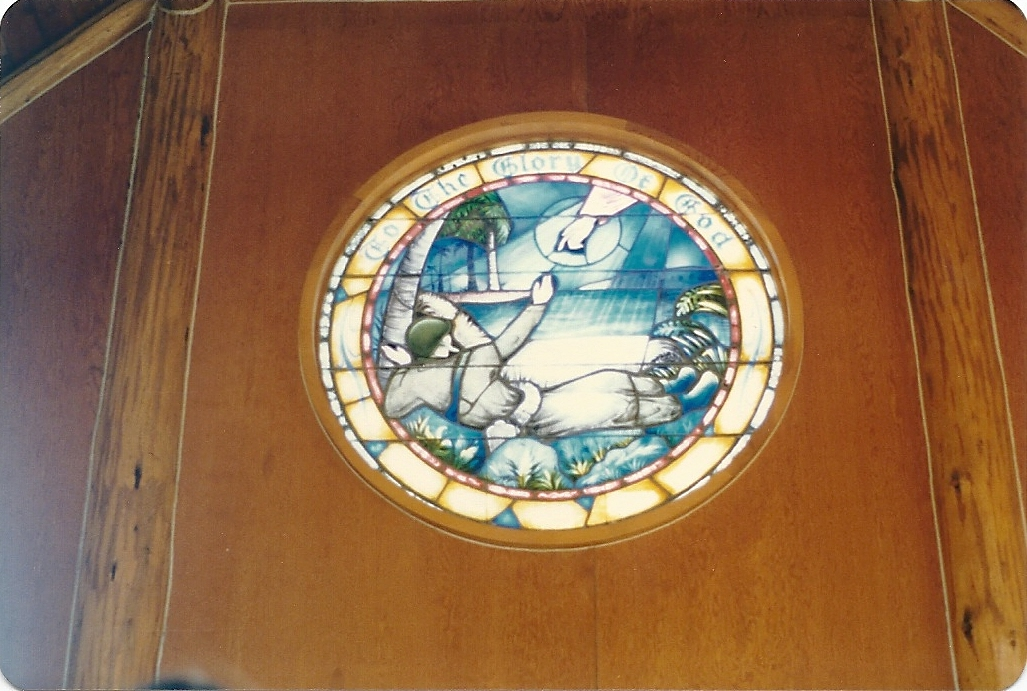
Stained glass over the entrance of the Soldier's Chapel

Pastors from many denominations provide services at the church. In a 1955 letter about the chapel, Colonel Story wrote: "splinter sects, itinerant prophets, hillbilly Bible thumpers and the self-anointed" were to be avoided and that "groups which harbor conscientious objectors or refuse to salute the flag" should be excluded because giving them access "would be a grave affront to the memory of those to whom the chapel will be dedicated." The first baby baptized in the chapel was Mikel Kallestad, a grandson of the colonel. This occurred on January 6, 1956, with 4 feet (1.2 m) of snow on the ground. Dozens of regimental veterans and locals are buried in the graveyard, which is adorned by a buffalo skull painted with the regimental crest. Now full, the cemetery includes the cenotaph of Chet Huntley, the NBC newscaster who was instrumental in founding the nearby Big Sky Resort. Story/Kallestad family members still own the land between the chapel and Lone Mountain, which will not be developed. Lone Mountain is viewable through the window behind the altar.

The chapel is one of the oldest structures in Big Sky but has no membership roll. Montana artist Jim Dick used the chapel as the subject for a Thanksgiving 2002 lithograph which was part of his "Montana Series".
