= Château de Farcheville =

Château in Essonne, France

Coordinates: 48°25′31″N 2°17′16″E

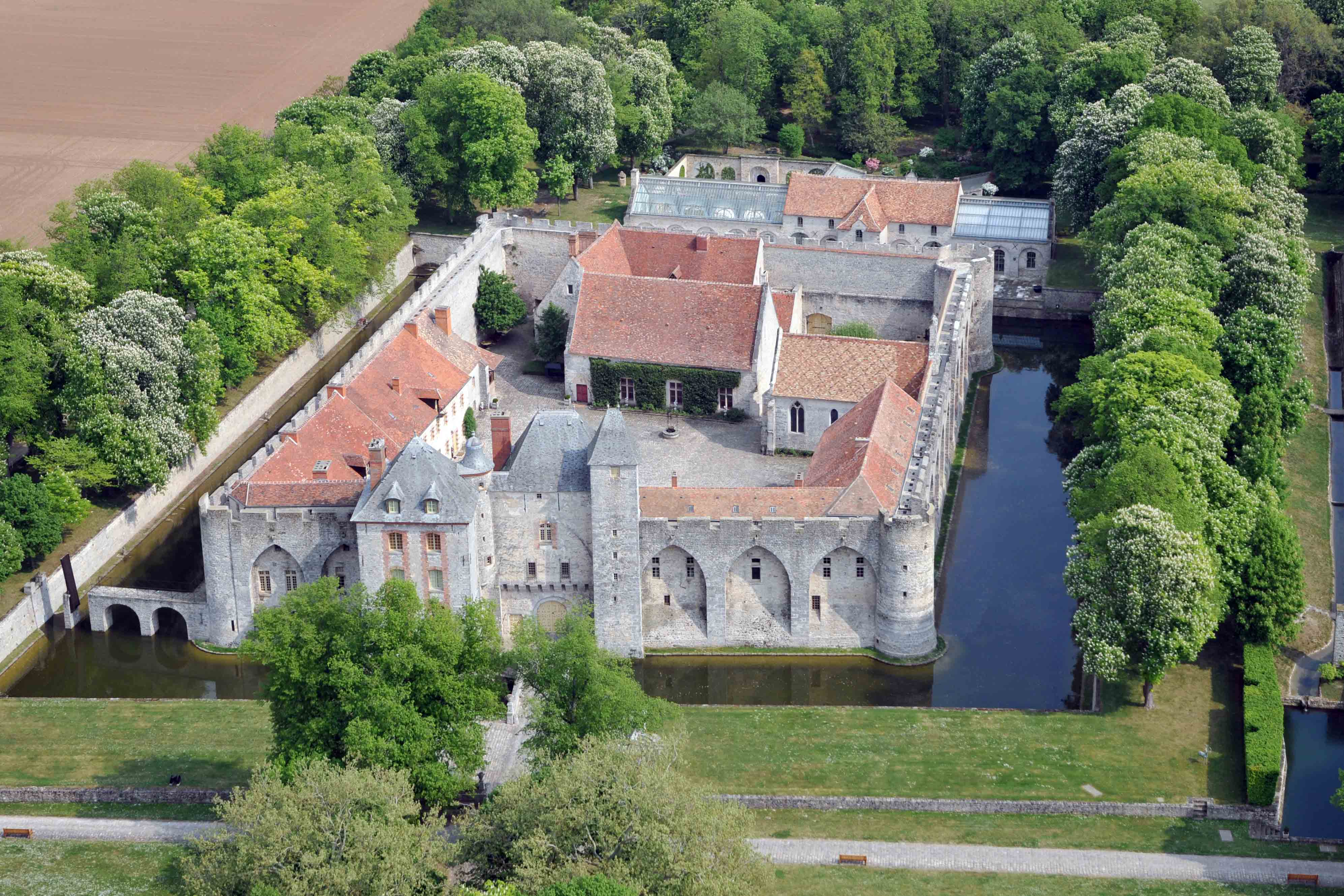
Aerial view of Château de Farcheville.

The Château de Farcheville is a 14th-century castle in the commune of Bouville near Paris in the département of Essonne.

The castle was built between 1290 and 1304, by Hughes II de Bouville and Hugues III, Lords of Farcheville and Bouville. The Château de Farcheville is a rare example of rural, open–filled castle of the medieval period. The great hall was built in 1291 and the castle chapel was consecrated in 1304. Both father and son were chamberlain to Philip IV of France. The structure possesses a rare northern French example of arched machicolations on buttresses, more characteristic of military architecture in the Languedoc. The castle passed to the family of Châtillon in the fifteenth century.

In 1990 film producer Jean Chalopin, owner of the property from 1989 to 2006, began a project to restore the Château.

The castle was once owned by Yellowstone Club founders Edra and Tim Blixseth. Following the Blixseth's 2009 divorce and bankruptcy, the castle was put up for sale by creditors for $57 million U.S. dollars. In 2010 the castle was bought by the current owner, a French holding company. The castle has its own moat, hunting grounds, 25 bedrooms, theatre, spa with 25 m heated indoor pool, garden, parc 1,000 acres (4.0 km^{2}), and a helipad. Today the structure is available to rent for private events.
