= 320 Guest Ranch =

Guest ranch in Montana

Coordinates: 45.103°N 111.216°W

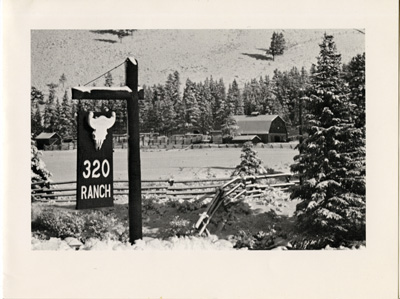
- 1974 Christmas card from the 320 Ranch
- Formerly: Buffalo Horn Resort
- Industry: Hospitality, guest ranch
- Founded: 1898
- Founder: Sam Wilson
- Owner: David Brask

320 Guest Ranch (formerly Buffalo Horn Resort) is a privately operated guest ranch located in the Gallatin Canyon between Big Sky, Montana and Yellowstone National Park. The ranch was first established as the Buffalo Horn Ranch in 1898 by Sam Wilson when he began to homestead 160 acres along Buffalo Horn Creek. In 1900, Wilson renamed the ranch to the Buffalo Horn Resort and began taking in guests, following the trend set by other ranches in the canyon. The 320 Guest Ranch was one of the first operating guest ranches in the Gallatin Canyon.

== History ==
The ranch was first established as the Buffalo Horn Ranch in 1898 by Sam Wilson when he began homesteading 160 acres along Buffalo Horn Creek. After combining with his father's neighboring 160 acre homestead in 1900, the ranch's acreage increase to 320 acres, which would influence the eventual renaming of the ranch. After the merger, Wilson renamed the ranch to the Buffalo Horn Resort and began taking in guests, following other ranches in the canyon. In 1901, Wilson changed the name of the ranch to the 320 Guest Ranch. In 1906, the Eldridge Post Office moved its operations to the ranch, where it remained until 1939. Also in 1906, Sam Wilson joined together with fellow area businessmen, Tom Michener and Pete Karst to try and actively grow the guest ranch business in the Gallatin Canyon.

In 1926, Wilson sold the ranch to a group of investors, including a man named Pete Kellorn, for $32,000. The investors failed to come up with the full amount of money to complete the sale. When Wilson died in 1929, the ranch was managed by Kellorn until Wilson's wife, Josephine Wilson, sold the ranch to Caroline McGill in 1936. Along with operating the guest ranch, McGill utilized the ranch as a retreat for her friends and patients. In 1938, the ranch was electrified and also fitted with a water system. McGill refurbished and improved the structures on the ranch, driven by her interest in preserving both the history and nature of the area. In the early 1950s, Patty and Jim Goodrich took over operation of the ranch from McGill. McGill retired in 1956 and lived on the ranch until her death in 1959. In her will, McGill gave the Goodriches the option to purchase the ranch and the surrounding land that had been purchased by McGill over the years. The Goodriches purchased the ranch and operated it until 1987, when the sold the property to David Brask. The Brask family still operates the ranch today.
