= Moonlight Basin =

Ski area in Montana, United States

- Location in Montana Moonlight Basin (the United States)
- Location: Big Sky, Montana
- Nearest city: Bozeman, Montana
- Coordinates: 45°18′51″N 111°27′03″W
- Top elevation: 11,166 feet (3,403.4 m)
- Base elevation: 7,000 feet (2,100 m)
- Skiable area: 1,900 acres (769 ha)
- Trails: 76+
- Longest run: 2.8 miles (4.5 km)
- Lift system: 6 chairlifts
- Snowfall: 400 inches
- Website: Official Site

Moonlight Basin is a private club in southwestern Montana, located in the Madison Range of the Rocky Mountains in the resort village of Big Sky. It became part of Big Sky Resort in October 2013 when it, along with ski terrain within the Club at Spanish Peaks, were bought and merged into Big Sky Resort, making it one of the largest single ski resorts in the United States, with 5,750 acres (2,330 ha) of terrain and over 30 ski lifts. Moonlight Basin features a variety of skiable area and a number of amenities, including two lodges and a golf course.

== Resort history ==
The resort's land was purchased in 1992 from Big Sky Lumber Company and began as Moonlight Basin Ranch, a real estate development on the north edge of the adjacent Big Sky Resort. The ranch's original 25,000 acres (10,000 ha) were purchased by partners Lee Poole and Joe Vujovich of nearby Ennis, as well as Keith Brown of Westlake, Ohio. They bought the land for $6.5 million from the Big Sky Lumber Company, a real estate development company created by Yellowstone Club founder Tim Blixseth and partners Mel and Norm MacDougal. The Moonlight Basin Ranch property sale was part of the 165,000 acres (67,000 ha) that Blixseth and the MacDougal brothers purchased from Plum Creek Timber for $27.5 million earlier in 1992.

Moonlight Basin opened as an independent ski area in December 2003 on the north face of Lone Mountain. The 11,166 foot (3403 m) summit can be accessed by the Lone Peak Tram, part of Big Sky Resort. The resort, which was built completely on private land, is adjacent to the Lee Metcalf Wilderness Area and the Yellowstone Club in the Madison River drainage in Madison County. The Big Sky Resort, also on private land, is in the Gallatin River drainage which drains into Gallatin County.

Moonlight Basin features a wide variety of terrain, the most extreme being the Headwaters Bowl. These steep chutes and gullies are on the north face of Lone Mountain, and can be hiked to from the Headwaters lift (opened in December 2005) or Big Sky's Challenger lift, both of which unload at just under 10,000 feet (3,048 m) above sea level.

The resort also features a number of open bowls, tree skiing, moguls, long groomers, and beginner runs. A full-day adult lift ticket for the 2008-2009 season was $39 (for reference, the full-day pass price for the 2020-2021 season averaged around $175). Initially, visitors could only ski the Moonlight Basin side; if they wanted access to Big Sky, they were required to buy a separate ticket. This changed in 2005, when Big Sky Resort and Moonlight Basin launched their "Biggest Skiing in America" deal, which gave visitors access to both resorts with the purchase one lift ticket (or season pass).

The primary lift at Moonlight Basin is Madison Eight, a high speed eight-person chairlift that climbs 1,850 vertical feet (564 m) from the base. The Headwaters chairlift connects at the top of Madison Eight after a short hike, rising another 685 feet (209 m), for a total of 2,535 feet (772 m) of lift-served vertical rise from the 7,000-foot (2,134 m) base. The other upper lift is the Lone Tree quad, a four-person chair that gives access to more advanced-level terrain northwest of the Headwaters Bowl.

The two original chairlifts at Moonlight Basin, Iron Horse & Pony Express, were installed by Moonlight Basin Ranch in the mid-1990s before it was a stand-alone ski area. The lifts were operated by the Big Sky Resort.

Moonlight Basin is part of the Greater Yellowstone Ecosystem, connecting two sections of the Lee Metcalf wilderness. It forms a wildlife corridor for elk migration and grizzly bear habitation. As such, the parent company of the ski resort, Moonlight Basin Ranch, has committed a significant percentage of its land holdings to conservation.

== Bankruptcy and merger ==
Poole, who had become the sole owner of Moonlight Basin after buying his partners' shares, filed for Chapter 11 bankruptcy protection in 2009. The reorganized property reopened in 2010 as Moonlight Basin Ranch LP, but remained under bankruptcy protection while proceedings continued in Montana Bankruptcy Court with principal debtor Lehman Brothers Holdings.

On October 1, 2013, Boyne Resorts and the Yellowstone Club (CrossHarbor Capital Partners) announced that they had acquired the assets to Moonlight Basin Resort. The two companies had just jointly-purchased the then-bankrupt Spanish Peaks Mountain Club for $26.1 million dollars that July. Following the purchase, Boyne announced that Moonlight Basin and Big Sky Resort would merge. The new resort would offer more than 5,750 acres of skiable terrain, 4,350 vertical feet, and 38 lifts, making it one of the biggest ski resorts in America.

== Activities and amenities ==
Moonlight Basin offers golf on a Jack Nicklaus-designed private golf course known as The Reserve at Moonlight Basin, which opened in 2016. The par-72 layout is 7,800 yards (7,132 m) at an average elevation of 7,500 feet (2,286 m). A spa, fine dining, and a four hole short course have since been added.

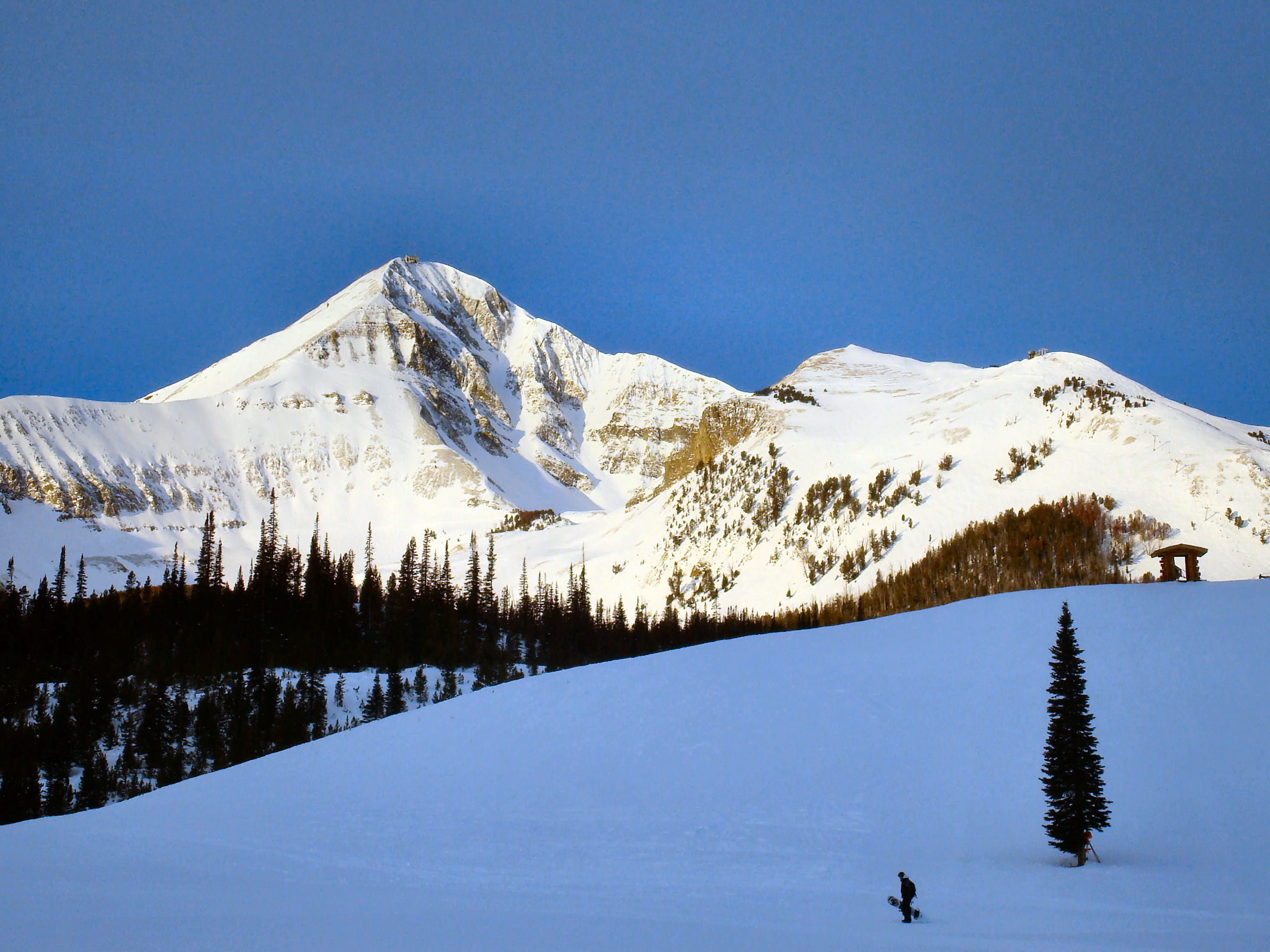
The northern face of Lone Peak with adjacent Headwaters Bowl (left). Moonlight Basin operates on this side of the mountain.

There are two lodges on the Moonlight Basin-side of the resort: the members-only Moonlight Lodge, and the Madison Lodge, accessible from the Madison Base Area. The former went private in 2017, though the Madison Lodge continues to be open to all guests. The Madison Base Area is home to a ski school, a restaurant, a rental shop, and a gift store. Another members-only lodge was recently completed in the Ulery's Lake neighborhood, the Lake Lodge opened in 2021.

Snowboarders hiking The Headwaters with Lone Peak in the background

== Resort statistics ==
- Total lifts: 7 (6 chairlifts, 1 conveyor)
- Total skiable area: 1,900 acres (769 ha)
- Summit Elevation: 11,166 ft (3,403.4 m)
- Base Elevation: 7,000 ft (2,100 m)
- Mapped Trails: 90
- Longest run: 2.8 miles (4.5 km)
- Average annual snowfall: 400 inches (10 m)
