= Big Sky, Montana =

- Census-designated place
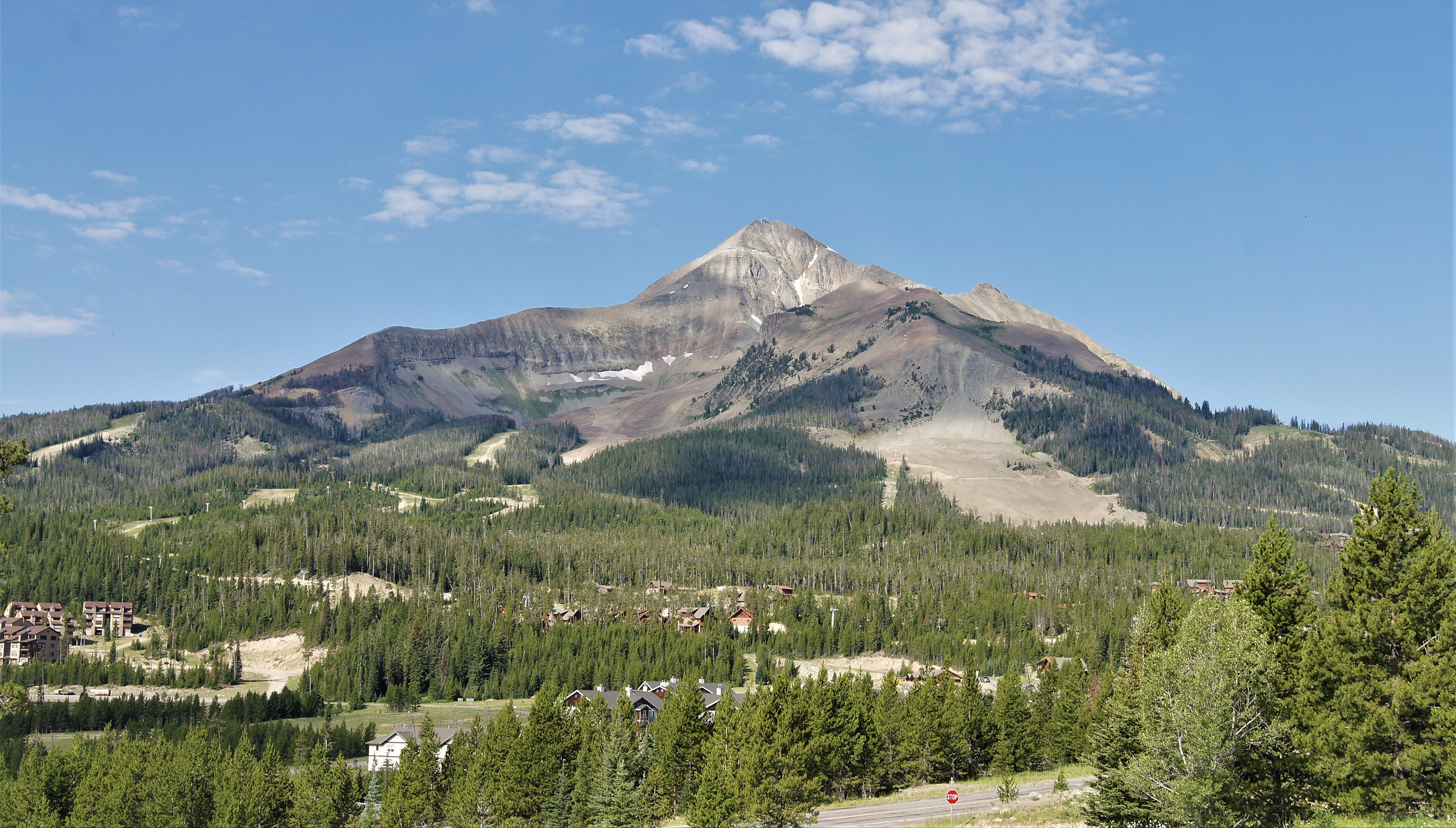
- Lone Mountain Grocery Mercantile

- Location of Big Sky within Gallatin County and the state of Montana
- Coordinates: 45°16′N 111°19′W
- Country: United States
- State: Montana
- Counties: Gallatin and Madison

Area
  - Total: 120.24 sq mi (311.43 km^{2})
  - Land: 120.00 sq mi (310.81 km^{2})
  - Water: 0.24 sq mi (0.61 km^{2})
- Elevation: 6,936 ft (2,114 m)

Population (2020)
  - Total: 3,591
  - Density: 29.9/sq mi (11.55/km^{2})
- Time zone: UTC-7 (Mountain (MST))
  - Summer (DST): UTC-6 (MDT)
- ZIP code: 59716
- Area code: 406
- FIPS code: 30-06325
- GNIS feature ID: 2407845

Big Sky is an unincorporated community and census-designated place (CDP) in Gallatin and Madison counties in southwestern Montana, United States. As of the 2020 census, it had a population of 3,591, up from 2,308 in 2010. It is 45 miles (72 km) by road southwest of Bozeman. The primary industry of the area is tourism.

== Geography ==
Big Sky is located close to the Yellowstone National Park along the western edge of Gallatin County and eastern edge of Madison County, on U.S. Highway 191. It is approximately midway between West Yellowstone and Bozeman, being around 45 miles (72 km) by road from each. It sits within the Madison Range, with elevations in the CDP ranging from 5,900 feet (1,800 m) in Gallatin Canyon along U.S. 191 to over 11,000 feet (3,400 m) at the summit of Lone Mountain.

The "Meadow" area of Big Sky lies in the eastern part of the CDP in an alpine valley formed during the Cretaceous period, at a base elevation of 6,200 feet (1,900 m). Initially called the "Gallatin Canyon Basin", the Meadow is braided with small rivers that channel mountain snow run-off. Fishing is permitted on all of these feeders of the Gallatin River. Two ponds are found on the Middle Fork of the Gallatin that bisects the Meadow, and fishing there is permitted for those 16 and younger. Since 1993, an innovative sewer system has protected the water in the area from sewage discharge. Several agencies, such as the Gallatin River Task Force, monitor the health of the rivers.

The "Mountain" area of Big Sky is west of the "Meadow" area at a base elevation of about 7,400 feet (2,300 m). The community had two large ski resorts in the "Mountain" area: Big Sky Resort and Moonlight Basin. In October 2013, these resorts merged: both are now managed by Big Sky Resort, and both are alpine ski and golf resorts. The combined terrain of the two resorts allows them to market themselves as the "Biggest Skiing in America", with over 5,800 acres (2,300 ha) of terrain. The Spanish Peaks Mountain Club is a ski and golf resort that has three chairlifts and 13 ski runs connecting it to Big Sky Resort at the base of Big Sky's Southern Comfort lift. Spanish Peaks is also now owned by Big Sky Resort, in collaboration with the Yellowstone Club. Another resort, Lone Mountain Ranch, is a Nordic ski and summer resort that professionally grooms over 75 kilometers of cross-country ski trails. Yellowstone Club, a private resort, is located to the south and adjacent to Big Sky Resort.

The "Canyon" area of Big Sky lies in the Gallatin Canyon in the northeast part of the CDP, along the Gallatin River, a favorite for whitewater rafters and kayakers. The river, named after Albert Gallatin who was the U.S. Secretary of the Treasury during the Lewis and Clark Expedition, is a Blue Ribbon trout stream that attracts fly-fishers from around the world. Several dude ranches (320 Guest Ranch, Elkhorn Ranch, Cinnamon Lodge and 9 Quarter Circle) operate in the Gallatin Canyon.

According to the U.S. Census Bureau, the CDP has a total area of 120.2 square miles (311.4 km^{2}), of which 120.0 square miles (310.8 km^{2}) are land and 0.2 square miles (0.6 km^{2}), or 0.18%, are water. Most of the CDP drains to the east into the Gallatin River, while the westernmost portions drain west via Cedar Creek and Jack Creek to the Madison River. The Gallatin and the Madison both drain north to form the Missouri River.

=== Climate ===
This climatic region is typified by large seasonal temperature differences, with warm to hot summers and cold (sometimes severely cold) winters. According to the Köppen Climate Classification system, Big Sky has a borderline humid continental (Dfb) / alpine subarctic climate (Dfc). for most of the area, but the lower elevations may be closer to a dry continental climate.

Climate data for Big Sky, Montana, 1991–2020 normals, extremes 1967–2021
Month	Jan	Feb	Mar	Apr	May	Jun	Jul	Aug	Sep	Oct	Nov	Dec	Year
Record high °F (°C)	55 (13)	57 (14)	65 (18)	77 (25)	84 (29)	91 (33)	95 (35)	93 (34)	91 (33)	84 (29)	67 (19)	53 (12)	95 (35)
Mean maximum °F (°C)	44.9 (7.2)	47.0 (8.3)	57.2 (14.0)	64.5 (18.1)	73.8 (23.2)	80.8 (27.1)	87.3 (30.7)	86.7 (30.4)	82.5 (28.1)	71.6 (22.0)	55.4 (13.0)	43.0 (6.1)	88.2 (31.2)
Mean daily maximum °F (°C)	29.8 (−1.2)	34.2 (1.2)	42.0 (5.6)	48.0 (8.9)	58.1 (14.5)	66.8 (19.3)	77.6 (25.3)	76.8 (24.9)	68.1 (20.1)	52.9 (11.6)	36.9 (2.7)	27.5 (−2.5)	51.6 (10.9)
Daily mean °F (°C)	19.2 (−7.1)	21.5 (−5.8)	29.3 (−1.5)	35.2 (1.8)	44.1 (6.7)	51.4 (10.8)	59.5 (15.3)	58.0 (14.4)	50.8 (10.4)	38.8 (3.8)	26.2 (−3.2)	18.0 (−7.8)	37.7 (3.2)
Mean daily minimum °F (°C)	8.5 (−13.1)	8.8 (−12.9)	16.6 (−8.6)	22.5 (−5.3)	30.0 (−1.1)	36.0 (2.2)	41.3 (5.2)	39.2 (4.0)	33.4 (0.8)	24.7 (−4.1)	15.6 (−9.1)	8.5 (−13.1)	23.8 (−4.6)
Mean minimum °F (°C)	−16.6 (−27.0)	−15.8 (−26.6)	−5.2 (−20.7)	6.3 (−14.3)	17.8 (−7.9)	25.8 (−3.4)	32.9 (0.5)	29.9 (−1.2)	22.0 (−5.6)	7.9 (−13.4)	−7.0 (−21.7)	−15.1 (−26.2)	−24.6 (−31.4)
Record low °F (°C)	−39 (−39)	−42 (−41)	−20 (−29)	−15 (−26)	8 (−13)	19 (−7)	22 (−6)	20 (−7)	5 (−15)	−12 (−24)	−26 (−32)	−41 (−41)	−42 (−41)
Average precipitation inches (mm)	1.83 (46)	1.51 (38)	1.88 (48)	2.42 (61)	2.83 (72)	3.22 (82)	1.25 (32)	1.56 (40)	1.70 (43)	1.77 (45)	1.60 (41)	1.74 (44)	23.31 (592)
Average snowfall inches (cm)	33.3 (85)	23.4 (59)	23.7 (60)	9.4 (24)	7.1 (18)	1.4 (3.6)	0.0 (0.0)	0.0 (0.0)	0.7 (1.8)	8.1 (21)	20.4 (52)	35.2 (89)	162.7 (413.4)
Average extreme snow depth inches (cm)	32.1 (82)	37.4 (95)	34.8 (88)	19.7 (50)	1.8 (4.6)	0.2 (0.51)	0.0 (0.0)	0.0 (0.0)	0.0 (0.0)	1.3 (3.3)	5.9 (15)	20.4 (52)	36.9 (94)
Average precipitation days (≥ 0.01 in)	12.6	11.5	11.5	11.5	13.4	14.4	10.2	11.2	9.6	9.6	11.1	13.7	140.3
Average snowy days (≥ 0.1 in)	11.5	10.0	9.4	4.7	2.6	0.3	0.0	0.0	0.4	3.8	9.6	12.4	64.7
Source 1: NOAA
Source 2: National Weather Service (snow/snow days 1981–2010)

== Demographics ==
Historical population
Census	Pop.	Note	%±
2000	1,221		—
2010	2,308		89.0%
2020	3,591		55.6%
U.S. Decennial Census

=== 2020 census ===
As of the 2020 census, Big Sky had a population of 3,591. The median age was 38.9 years. 16.0% of residents were under the age of 18 and 12.6% of residents were 65 years of age or older. For every 100 females there were 127.6 males, and for every 100 females age 18 and over there were 130.6 males age 18 and over.

0.0% of residents lived in urban areas, while 100.0% lived in rural areas.

There were 1,495 households in Big Sky, of which 23.5% had children under the age of 18 living in them. Of all households, 47.8% were married-couple households, 26.2% were households with a male householder and no spouse or partner present, and 15.7% were households with a female householder and no spouse or partner present. About 25.0% of all households were made up of individuals and 6.5% had someone living alone who was 65 years of age or older.

There were 3,504 housing units, of which 57.3% were vacant. The homeowner vacancy rate was 3.5% and the rental vacancy rate was 28.7%.

Racial composition as of the 2020 census
Race	Number	Percent
White	3,187	88.7%
Black or African American	11	0.3%
American Indian and Alaska Native	15	0.4%
Asian	30	0.8%
Native Hawaiian and Other Pacific Islander	10	0.3%
Some other race	118	3.3%
Two or more races	220	6.1%
Hispanic or Latino (of any race)	243	6.8%

=== 2010 census ===
At the 2010 census, there were 2,308 people living in the CDP. The population density was 10.1 per square mile.

== Activities ==
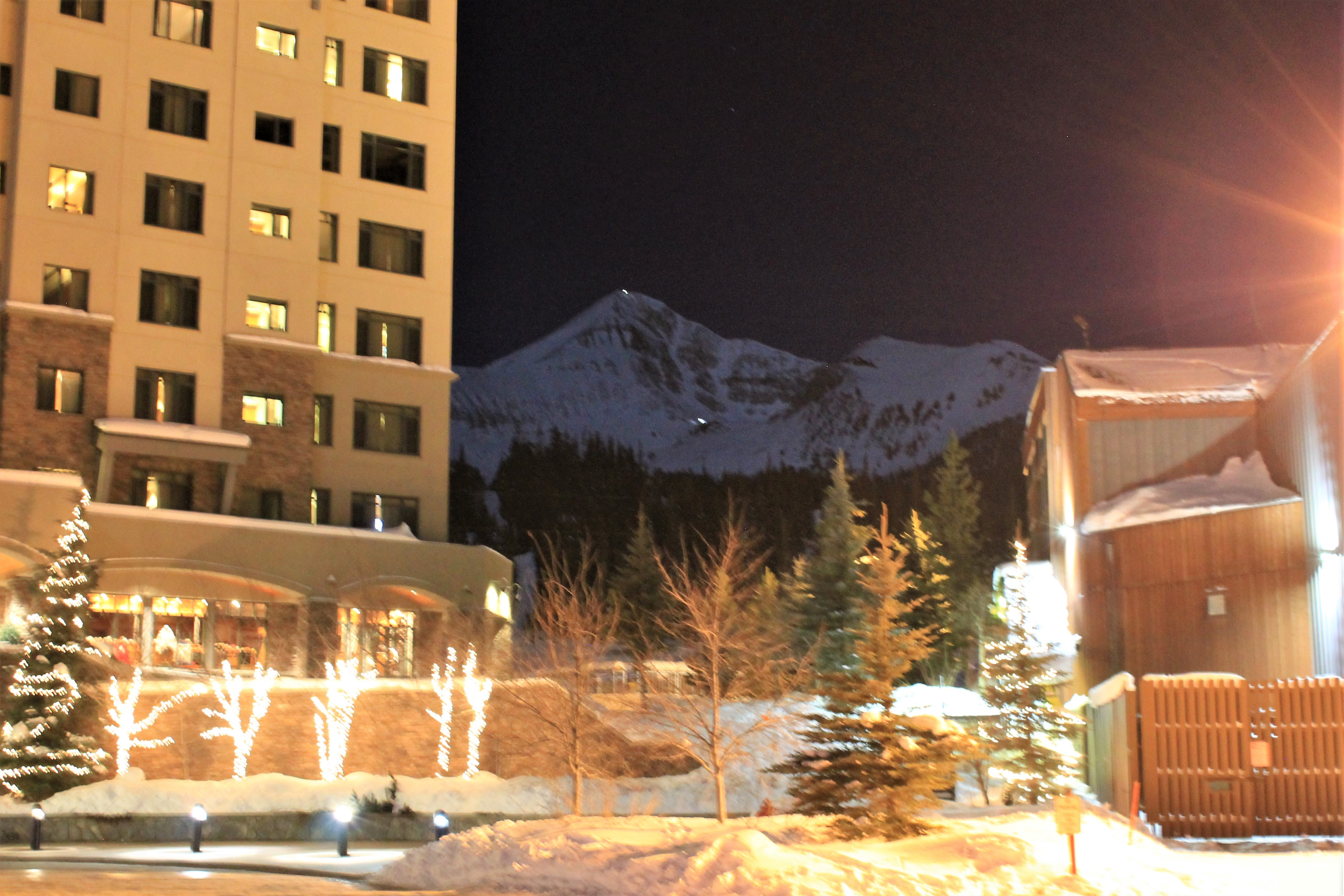
Lone Peak seen from Big Sky Resort, 2018

Hiking trails thread throughout the landscape and into neighboring national forests. Camping sites are available throughout the Spanish Peaks and the Gallatin National Forest. Elk, deer, black bears, grizzlies, upland birds, waterfowl, and wolves call this area home. Hunting is prohibited in Big Sky proper, but it is permitted throughout the National Forests that surround the area. Recreational snowmobiling is also not permitted within the Meadow or Mountain terrain, but is permitted in the Gallatin Canyon and in areas to the south of Big Sky.

The Crail Ranch Buildings, built by Montana pioneer Frank Crail and his family, offer a glimpse of life in Big Sky more than 100 years ago. The authentic cabins are preserved as part of the Crail Ranch Homestead Museum. The museum displays artifacts, photographs and documents, along with extensive information about the pioneer Crail and Creek families.

== Education ==
The Gallatin County portion of the CDP is in Big Sky School K-12. The Madison County portion is in Ennis K-12 Schools school district.

In addition to the Big Sky School District #72 and the Ennis district, Big Sky has a preK-12 non-profit private school, Big Sky Discovery Academy. The Gallatin County side has three public schools: Ophir Elementary School, Ophir Middle School and Lone Peak High School. The district educates approximately 425 students.

== Media ==
Big Sky has two local newspapers, Explore Big Sky, and Lone Peak Lookout, in addition to the regional publication, Bozeman Chronicle.

The local radio station is KBZM. Other regional radio stations can be received from Bozeman.

Three television stations are available: KTVM (6) NBC, KBZK (7) CBS, and KUSM (9) PBS.

ExploreBigSky.com is a regional daily news website.

== Notable people ==
- Jessica Biel, actress, and her husband, pop star Justin Timberlake
- Troy Downing, politician, technology entrepreneur
- Robert Peter Gale, cancer researcher
- Chet Huntley, pioneering newscaster, retired to Big Sky
- Bode Miller, former Olympian ski racer
- Warren Miller, film director, lived in Big Sky during the winter
- Matt Morris, former Major League Baseball pitcher
- Marty Pavelich, NHL player, year-round resident
- Jamie Pierre, professional skier, snowboarder

== See also ==
- Soldiers Chapel
