= Big Sky Resort =

Ski resort in Montana, United States

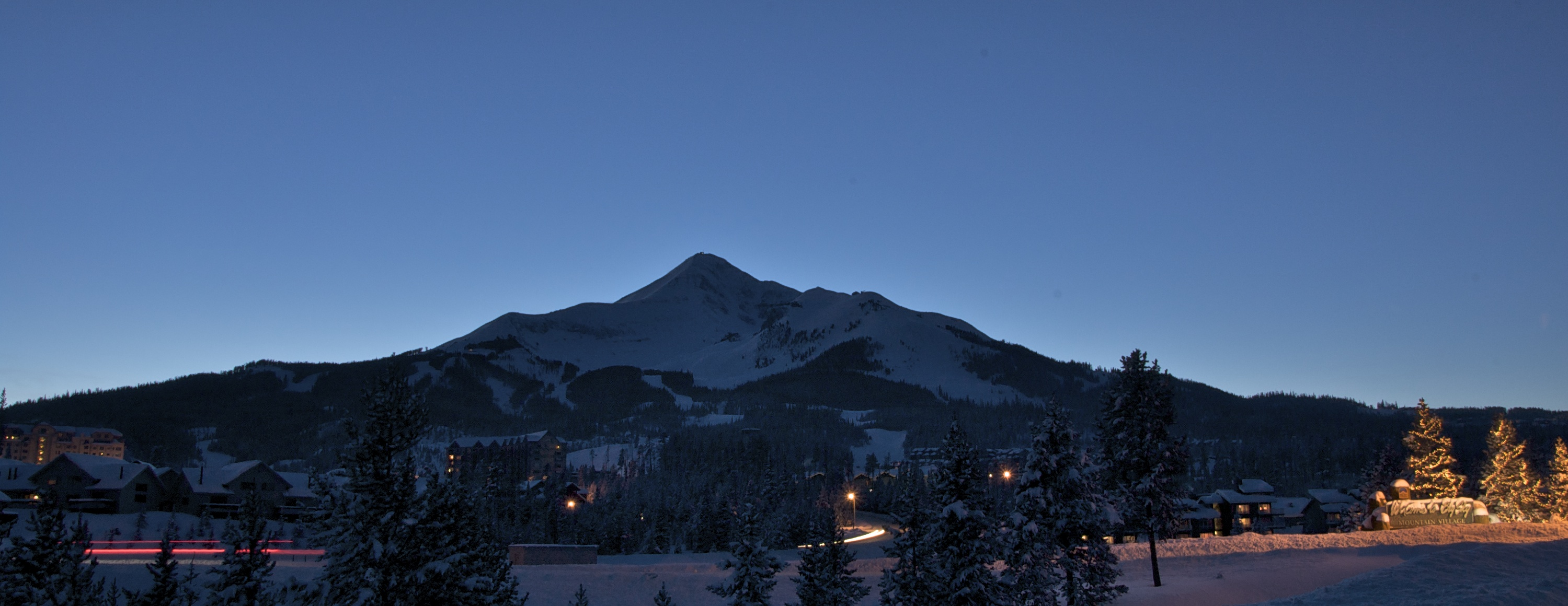
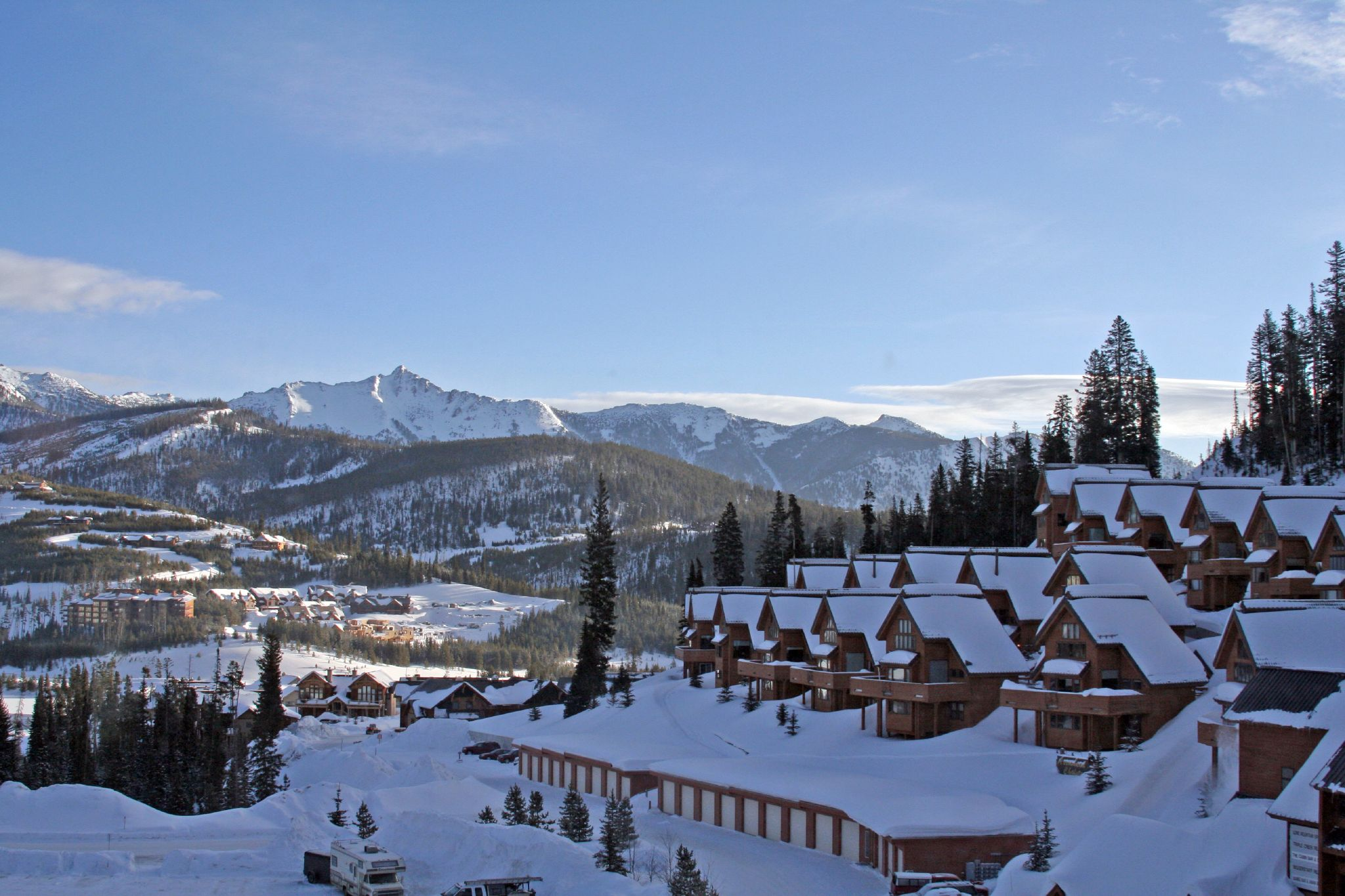
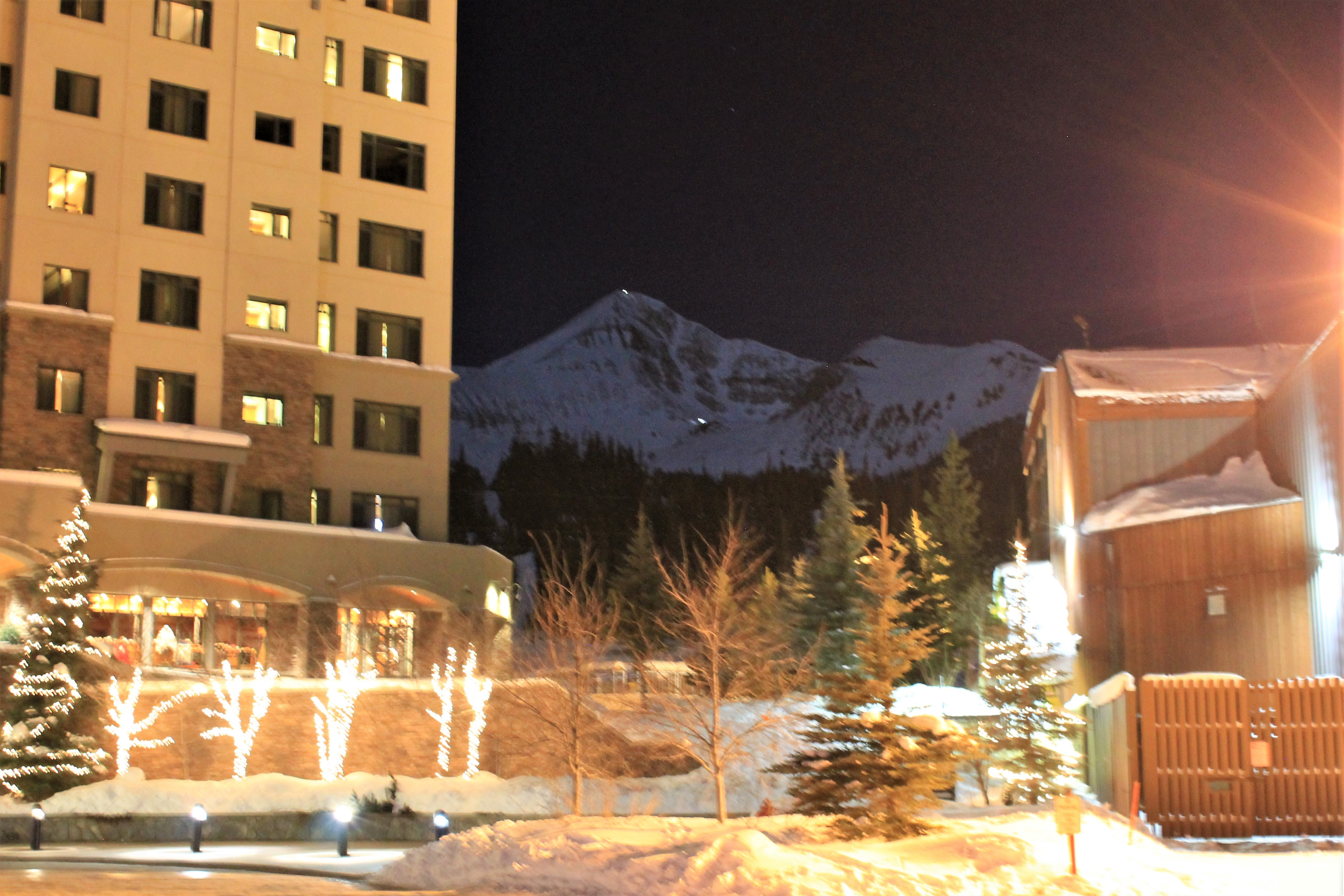
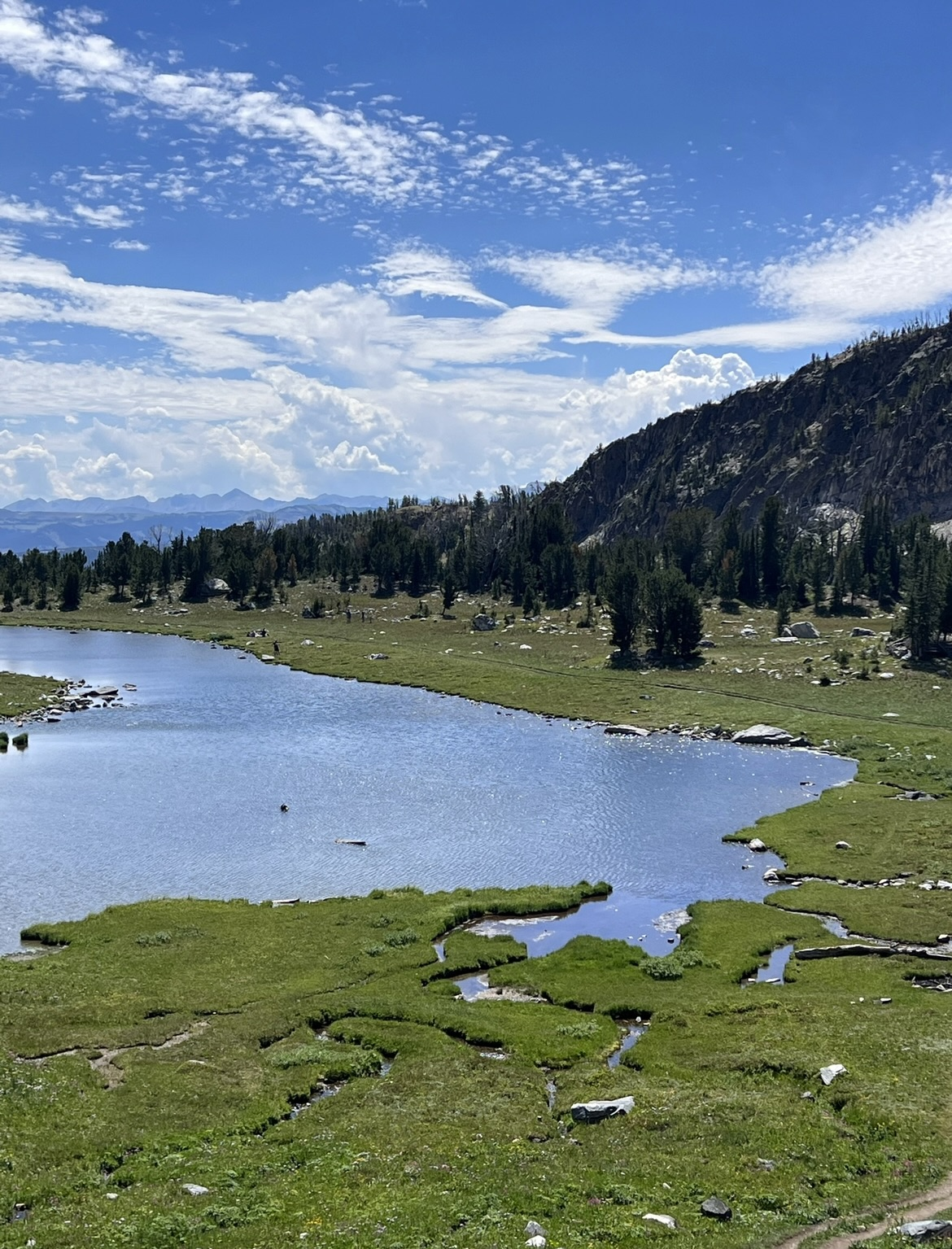
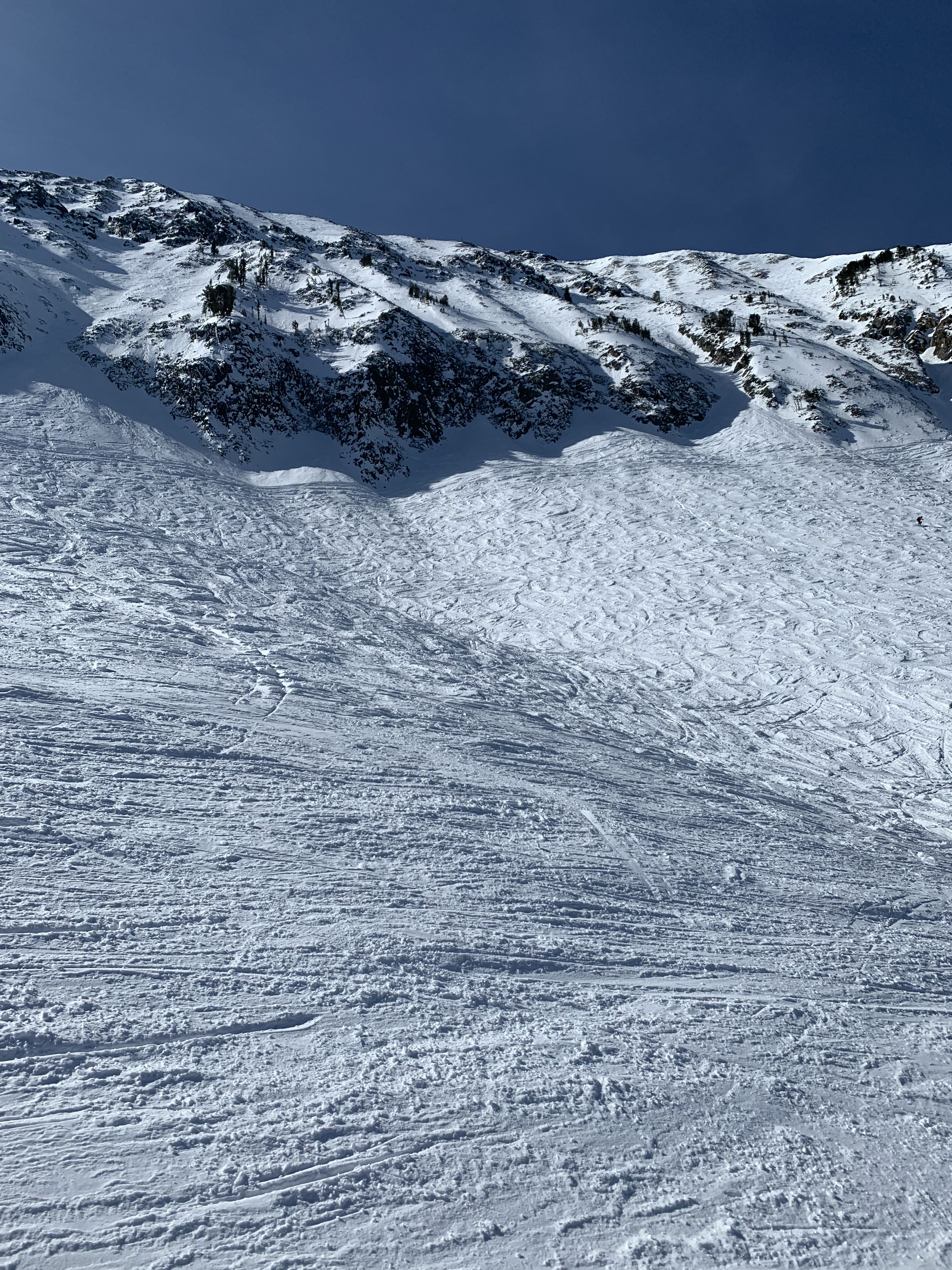
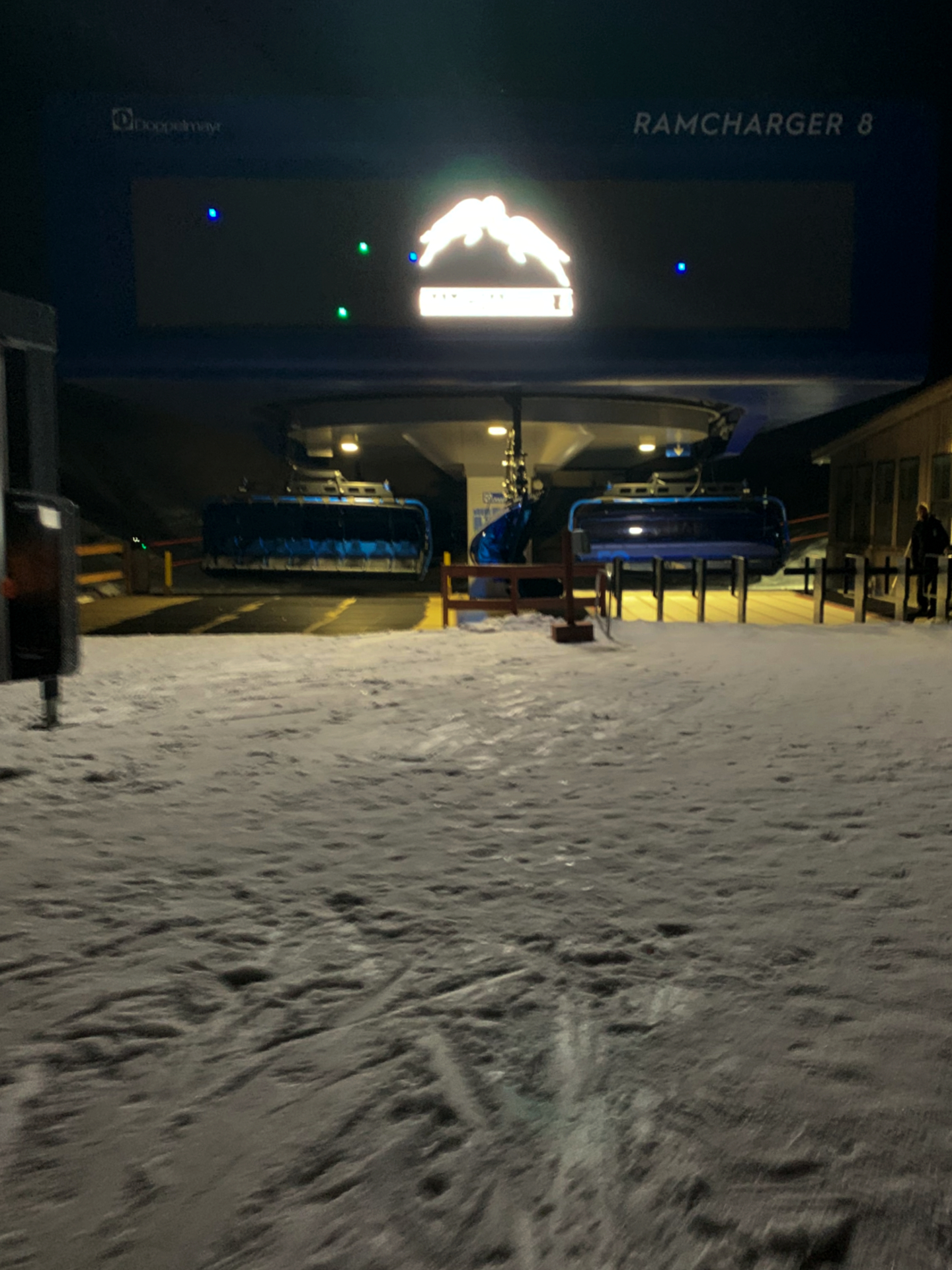
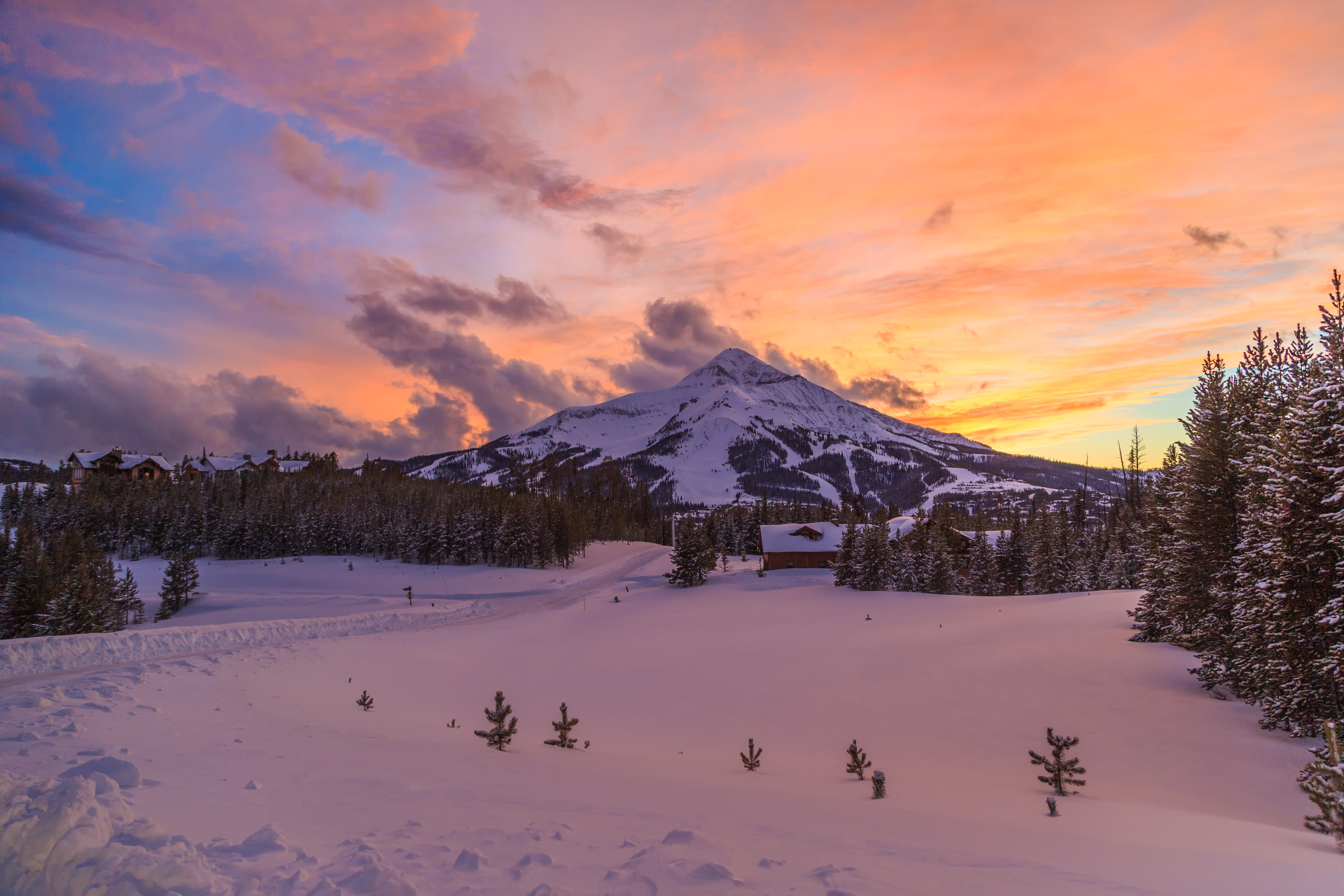
- Lone Mountain Arrowhead Condos Bottom of Big Sky Resort Alpine Lake Mountain Bowl Ramcharger 8 chairlift Sunset View Big Sky Resort in 2006

- Location in Montana
- Location: Big Sky, Madison County, Montana; United States
- Mountain: Lone Mountain, Andesite Mountain, Spirit Mountain, Flat Iron Mountain
- Nearest city: Bozeman - 50 mi (80 km)
- Coordinates: 45°16′30″N 111°25′55″W
- Status: Operating
- Owner: Boyne Resorts
- Multi-resort pass: Ikon Pass, Mountain Collective
- Vertical: 4,350 ft (1,326 m) total
- Top elevation: 11,166 ft (3,403 m)
- Base elevation: 6,800 ft (2,073 m); Lone Moose; 7,500 ft (2,286 m); Mountain Village
- Skiable area: 5,850 acres (23.7 km^{2})
- Trails: 320+: 21% beginner; 29% intermediate; 31% advanced; 19% expert and extreme
- Longest run: 6 mi (10 km)
- Lift system: 40 lifts (1 aerial tram, 2 gondolas, 8 high-speed detachable chairlifts, 16 fixed-grip chairlifts, and 13 surface lifts)
- Snowmaking: Yes, 10%
- Website: bigskyresort.com

Big Sky Resort, known colloquially as Big Sky, is a ski resort within Big Sky, Montana. It is about 50 mi (80 km) from Bozeman. The resort takes its name from Montana's nickname as the "Big Sky Country".

Opened in late 1973, Big Sky Resort has 5,850 acres (9.1 sq mi; 23.7 km^{2}) of terrain and a vertical drop of 4,350 feet (1,330 m). In July 2013, Big Sky Resort acquired 200 acres (0.8 km^{2}) on Spirit Mountain, which were previously owned by Spanish Peaks, a private club. In October of the same year, Big Sky Resort acquired the terrain and facilities of Moonlight Basin, a neighboring resort that shared the northern exposure of Lone Mountain.

Big Sky Resort also offers meeting space for conferences, weddings, and corporate retreats.

== Resort history ==
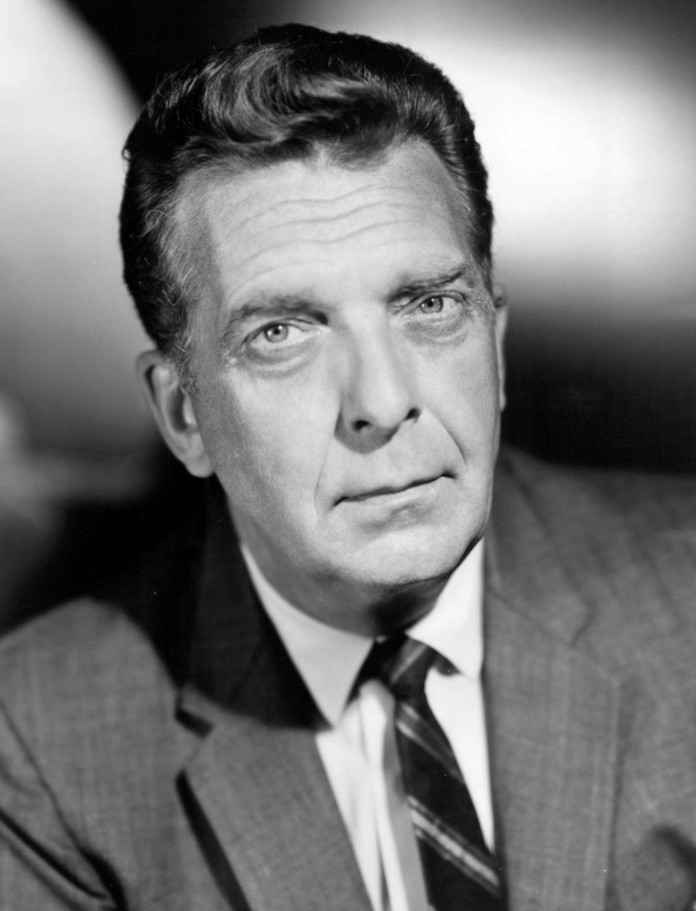
Chet Huntley, founder of Big Sky Resort

The resort was founded by Montana native Chet Huntley, the retired co-anchorman of The Huntley–Brinkley Report of NBC News. Big Sky opened in December 1973, with its main base area at an elevation of 7,510 ft (2,290 m) above sea level, on the eastern face of the 11,167-foot (3,404 m) Lone Mountain, the sixty-seventh highest mountain in Montana, and the seventh-highest mountain in the state outside of the Beartooth Range.

The first three lifts installed included a gondola and two chairlifts. The enclosed gondola carried four skiers per cabin, and climbed 1,525 feet (465 m) to an elevation of 9,040 ft (2,755 m). The nearby Lone Peak triple chairlift provided the lift-served maximum of 9,800 ft (2,985 m), unloading at the bowl 1,366 ft (416 m) beneath Lone Mountain's summit, providing a vertical drop of just under 2,300 ft (700 m), and the Explorer double chair served novice terrain just above the base. The fourth lift was the Andesite double, which climbed the north face of adjacent Andesite Mountain to 8,700 ft (2,650 m); it was renamed Ram's Horn in 1978, and replaced with the Ramcharger high speed quad in 1990, and the Ramcharger 8 lift, North America's first 8-person lift, in 2018.

Boyne Resorts purchased the resort in 1976, following Huntley's death from cancer in March 1974, and the decision of owner Chrysler Corporation to divest its real estate development assets.

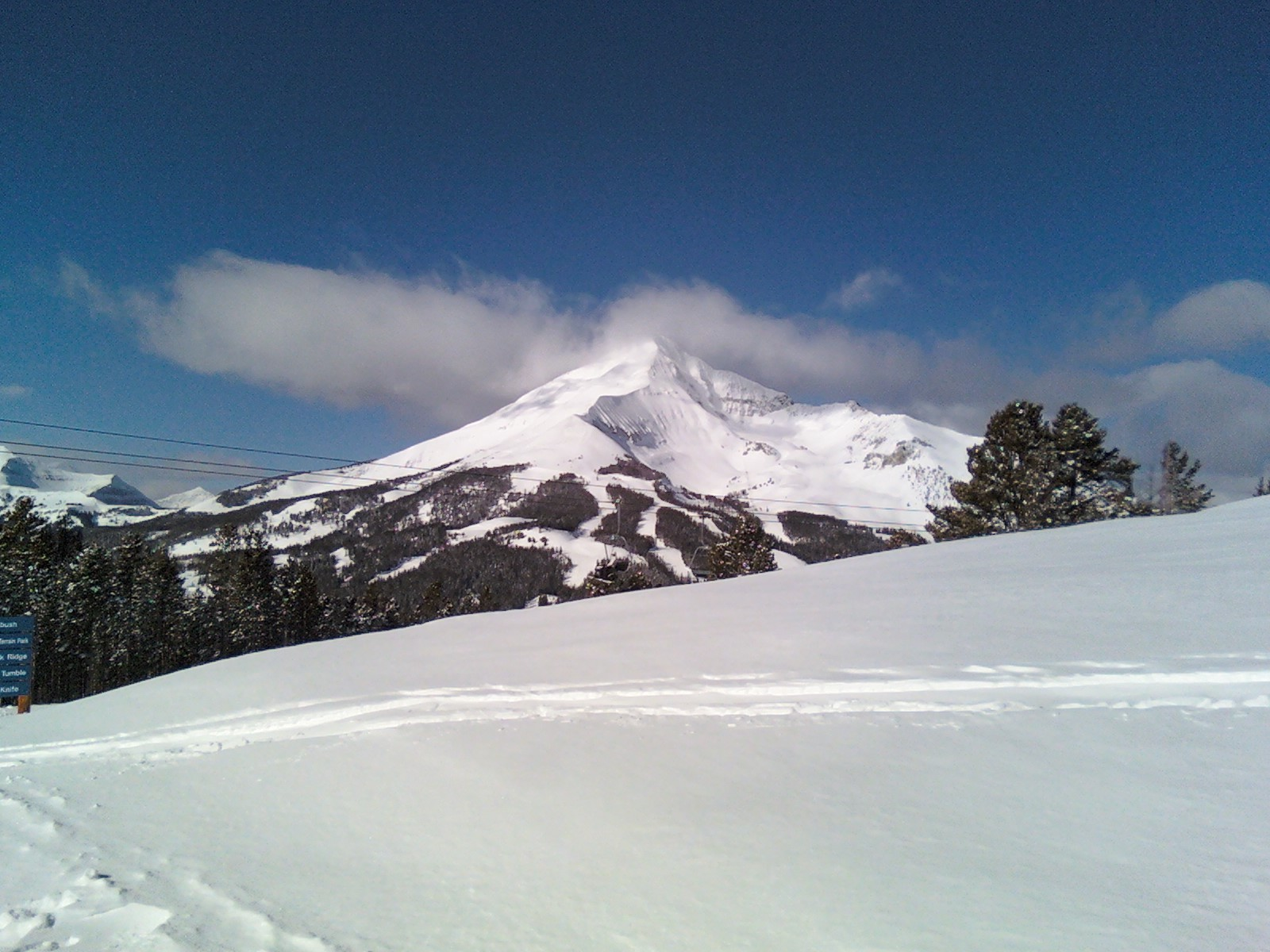
Lone Peak, the top of the resort mountain

The resort grew steadily over the following decades, adding lifts and more than tripling the terrain available for skiing and snowboarding. The fifth lift, a second chairlift on Andesite Mountain, was installed in the summer of 1979. The Mad Wolf double climbed Andesite's eastern face and lowered Big Sky's minimum elevation 540 ft (165 m) to 6,970 ft (2,125 m). This increased the area's vertical drop to over 2,800 ft (855 m). The Mad Wolf lift was replaced with the Thunder Wolf high speed quad in 1994.

Two lifts were added in the 1980s, Gondola Two was installed in parallel to the first gondola, and the Challenger double chair served upper-elevation expert terrain on the north edge of the ski area. A tow was later added above this lift. Gondola Two was replaced with a Doppelmayr high speed quad, Swift Current 4, in 1997. The eighth lift at Big Sky was the Southern Comfort on the south side of Andesite Mountain, a Heron-Poma triple chairlift acquired from Copper Mountain in Colorado, installed in 1990 and upgraded to a high speed quad for the 2004-2005 ski season.

In the fall of 1995, Big Sky installed the Lone Peak Tram to provide access to expert terrain from the 11,166-foot (3,403 m) Lone Mountain summit. The Shedhorn double chair was also part of this expansion, installed in 1995 on the lower south face of Lone Mountain.

The tram increased Big Sky's vertical drop to 4,180 ft (1,275 m). The minimum elevation was lowered further in the fall of 1999, with the addition of a used triple chairlift from Keystone Resort in Colorado, starting at a base elevation of 6,800 ft (2,075 m) at Lone Moose Meadows. This increased the ski area's total vertical drop to 4,350 ft (1,330 m), with the maximum continuous vertical drop increased to 4,100 ft (1,250 m) from the top of the tram to the main base area.

In 1990 the Shoshone Condominium Hotel and the Yellowstone Conference Center were built.

In April 2000, Boyne Resorts announced that an estimated $400 million in improvements would take place over the next ten years to the Mountain Village and the ski area. Later in 2000, the $54 million Summit Hotel was completed. In late 2007, the $25 million Village Center Complex was opened.

In 2007, Big Sky expanded the skiing opportunities on the south face of Lone Peak with the reinstallation of the original Southern Comfort triple chairlift as the Dakota chairlift on the south side of Lone Peak, providing access to the accompanying out-of-bounds sidecountry, Dakota Territory. Gondola One was retired in the summer of 2008, dismantled due to the rising cost of repairs.

Big Sky's neighbor on its north boundary, Moonlight Basin, merged with Big Sky Resort in October 2013.

== Activities ==
Winter activities include skiing and snowboarding, seven terrain parks, zip-line, and snowshoeing. Summer attractions include zip-lines, archery, tennis, hiking, and mountain biking trails on the mountain. Golf and horseback riding are available near the Meadow Village at an elevation of 6,300 feet (1,920 m), between the ski area and US-191.

=== Terrain aspects - skiing ===
Big Sky's main summit (Lone Peak) sits at an elevation of 11,166 feet. All of the resorts terrain faces all four points on a compass, with most of the terrain either facing north, or east.

- North: 37%
- West: 2%
- East: 36%
- South: 25%

== Lift system ==
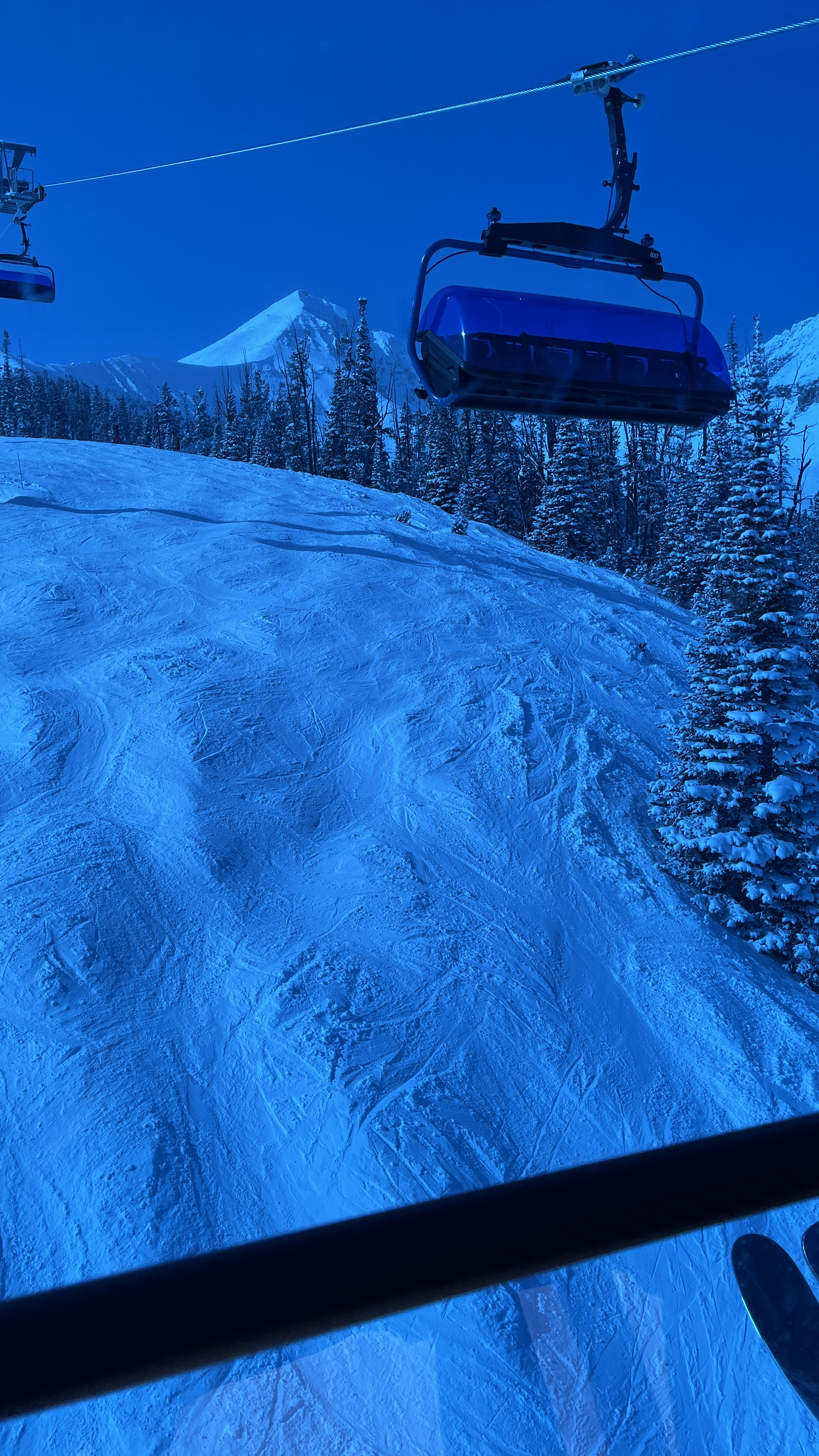
Inside the Swift Current 6 lift at the resort, a six-person lift with bubble covers

Big Sky has one of the largest chairlift fleets of any ski area in North America. The resort has 40 lifts, of which ten are detachable lifts, five of those lifts having blue bubbles.

In 2013, Moonlight Basin and Spanish Peaks were absorbed into Big Sky's lift system.

=== Lone Peak Tram ===
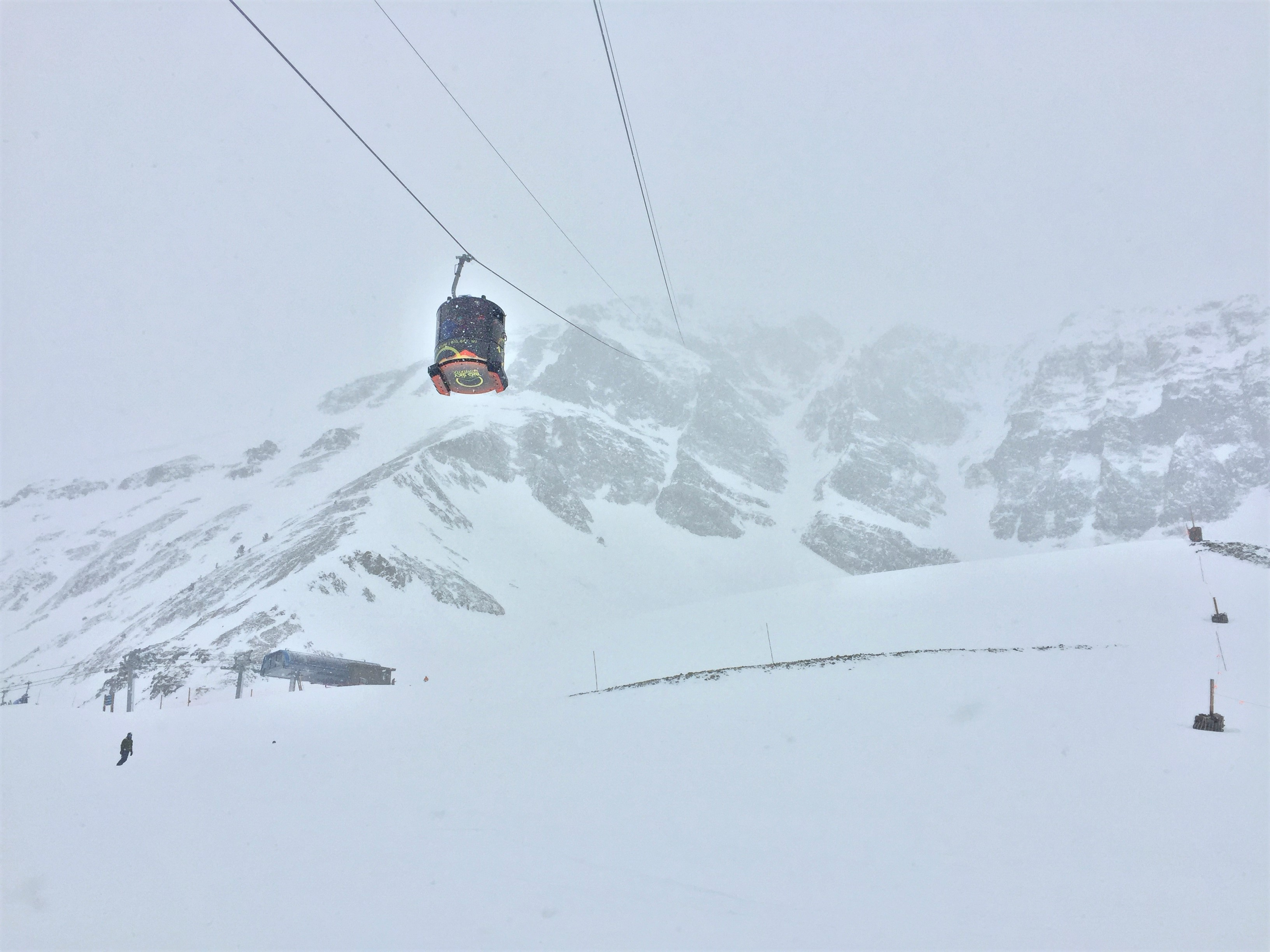
Lone Peak Tram, January 2018

The Lone Peak Tram is an aerial tramway that transports guests to the summit of Lone Mountain at 11,166 ft (3,403 m). The original tram was constructed in the fall of 1995, with 15 passenger cabins climbing 1,420 ft (433 m) over a distance of 2,828 ft (862 m) from the summit of Powder Seeker. It provided access to the most difficult terrain at Big Sky Resort, including former Moonlight Basin terrain. Construction was completed by the high-altitude construction firm Matrix, based in Alaska. Beginning in the summer 2012 season, Big Sky introduced daily summer tram rides to take visitors to the top of Lone Peak, called the Lone Peak Expedition. Starting in the 2021/2022 season, access to the tram required the purchase of a tram pass pack, individual day passes between $20-$80 USD, a Gold season pass for unlimited access, or a Double Black season pass for 10 days. In the 2022/23 season that changed to a per-ride rate, and in 2024/25 the add-on charge was removed for lift ticket holders, but remains for guests with Ikon, Mountain Collective, or Big Sky season passes that do not include tram access.

In early 2022, it was announced that the tram would be replaced by a new tram, starting near the base of Powder Seeker and adjacent to the top station of the future Explorer Gondola. The original tram's lower terminal was located on an active rock glacier and thus was gradually moved out of place. The new design features two cabins that each hold up to 75 passengers, traveling at 10 m/s and reaching the summit in just under 4 minutes. Unique features include glass-floor panels visible during summer tram rides.
