= List of California ski resorts =

List of California ski resorts is a list of ski resorts in California, that displays relevant statistics such as nearest city, peak elevation (ft), base elevation (ft), vertical drop (ft), skiable acreage, total number of trails, total number of lifts, and average annual snowfall (in).

Comparison table of California ski resorts
Resort name	Nearest city	Peak elevation (ft)	Base elevation (ft)	Vertical drop	Skiable acreage	Total trails	Total lifts	Avg annual snowfall	Date statistics updated
Palisades Tahoe	Olympic Valley	9,050	6,200	2,850	3,600	170	29	450"	March 2020
Mammoth Mountain	Mammoth Lakes	11,053	7,953	3,100	3,500	150	25	400"	March 2020
Heavenly Mountain Resort	South Lake Tahoe	10,040	6,567	3,500	4,800	97	28	360"	March 2020
Mount Shasta Ski Park	Mount Shasta	7,536	5,500	2,036	635	38	6	157"	January 2026
Alpine Meadows	Alpine Meadows	8,637	6,835	1,802	2,400	100	13	450"	March 2020
Boreal	Soda Springs	7,700	7,200	500	380	41	8	400"	November 19, 2012
Donner Ski Ranch	Norden	7,781	7,031	750	435	52	8	400"	April 20, 2012
Homewood	Homewood	7,881	6,223	1,658	1,260	60	7	400"	April 20, 2012
Kirkwood	Kirkwood	9,800	7,800	2,000	2,300	65	15	500"	April 20, 2012
Northstar at Tahoe	Truckee	8,610	6,330	2,280	2,904	106	19	350"	November 19, 2012
Sierra-at-Tahoe	Twin Bridges	8,852	6,640	2,212	2,000	47	14	460"	January 9, 2023
Sugar Bowl	Norden	8,383	6,883	1,500	1,500	94	13	500"	November 19, 2012
Soda Springs	Soda Springs	7,325	6,673	652	200	15	2	400"	April 20, 2012
Tahoe Donner	Truckee	7,350	6,750	600	120	10	3	400"	April 20, 2012
Bear Valley	Angels Camp	8,500	6,600 (mid-mountain 7550)	1,900	1,680	67	10	359"	Oct 1, 2015
Dodge Ridge	Sonora	8,200	6,600	1,600	832	67	12	400"	January 9, 2023
June Mountain	June Lake	10,090	7,545	2,590	500	35	7	250"	April 20, 2012
China Peak	Lakeshore	8,709	7,030	1,673	1,200	45	11	300"	April 20, 2012
Alta Sierra	Wofford Heights	7,091	6,491	600		6	2		April 20, 2012
Buckhorn Ski and Snowboard Club	Three Points	7,903	7,203	680	40	5	2	180"	April 20, 2012
Bear Mountain	Big Bear Lake	8,805	7,104	1,665	198	24	12	100"	November 14, 2012
Badger Pass	Yosemite National Park	8,000	7,200	800	90	10	5	300"	April 20, 2012
Mount Baldy Ski Lifts	Mount Baldy	8,600	6,500	2,100	800	26	4	170"	April 20, 2012
Mount Waterman	Three Points	8,030	7,000	1,030	150	27	3	180"	April 20, 2012
Mountain High	Wrightwood	8,200	6,600	1,600	290	59	13		November 14, 2012
Snow Summit	Big Bear Lake	8,174	6,965	1,209	240	30	14	100"	February 27, 2018
Snow Valley Mountain Resort	Running Springs	7,841	6,800	1,041	240	29	12	150"	April 20, 2012
Cedar Pass Ski Area	Alturas								August 1, 2019

== See also ==
- List of Lake Tahoe ski resorts
- Comparison of Colorado ski resorts
- Comparison of New Mexico ski resorts
- Comparison of North American ski resorts
- Comparison of Southeastern United States ski resorts
- List of ski areas and resorts in the United States
