= List of Lake Tahoe ski resorts =

List of Lake Tahoe ski resorts is a list of ski resorts in the Lake Tahoe area that displays relevant statistics such as nearest city, peak elevation, base elevation, vertical drop, skiable acreage, average annual snowfall, and number of trails.

Comparison table of Lake Tahoe area ski resorts
Resort name	State	Nearest city	Peak elevation	Base elevation	Vertical drop	Skiable acreage	Average annual snowfall	Number of trails
Palisades Tahoe	California	Olympic Valley	9,050 ft (2,760 m)	6,200 ft (1,900 m)	2,850 ft (870 m)	6,000 acres (2,400 ha)	407 in (1,030 cm)	270
Heavenly Mountain Resort	California	South Lake Tahoe	10,067 ft (3,068 m)	7,170 ft (2,190 m)	3,500 ft (1,100 m)	4,800 acres (1,900 ha)	280 in (710 cm)	114
Boreal	California	Soda Springs	7,700 ft (2,300 m)	7,200 ft (2,200 m)	500 ft (150 m)	380 acres (150 ha)	315 in (800 cm)	34
Donner Ski Ranch	California	Norden	8,012 ft (2,442 m)	7,031 ft (2,143 m)	750 ft (230 m)	505 acres (204 ha)	120 in (300 cm)	52
Homewood	California	Homewood	7,880 ft (2,400 m)	6,230 ft (1,900 m)	1,650 ft (500 m)	1,260 acres (510 ha)	284 in (720 cm)	67
Kirkwood	California	Kirkwood	9,800 ft (3,000 m)	7,800 ft (2,400 m)	2,000 ft (610 m)	2,300 acres (930 ha)	370 in (940 cm)	76
Northstar at Tahoe	California	Truckee	8,610 ft (2,620 m)	6,330 ft (1,930 m)	2,280 ft (690 m)	3,170 acres (1,280 ha)	348 in (880 cm)	100
Sierra-at-Tahoe	California	Twin Bridges	8,852 ft (2,698 m)	6,640 ft (2,020 m)	2,212 ft (674 m)	2,000 acres (810 ha)	337 in (860 cm)	47
Sugar Bowl	California	Norden	8,383 ft (2,555 m)	6,883 ft (2,098 m)	1,500 ft (460 m)	1,650 acres (670 ha)	326 in (830 cm)	105
Soda Springs	California	Soda Springs	7,352 ft (2,241 m)	6,700 ft (2,000 m)	652 ft (199 m)	200 acres (81 ha)	232 in (590 cm)	19
Tahoe Donner	California	Truckee	7,350 ft (2,240 m)	6,750 ft (2,060 m)	600 ft (180 m)	120 acres (49 ha)	220 in (560 cm)	17
Bear Valley	California	Angels Camp	8,500 ft (2,600 m)	6,600 ft (2,000 m)	1,900 ft (580 m)	1,680 acres (680 ha)	288 in (730 cm)	122
Mount Rose Ski Tahoe	Nevada	Reno	9,700 ft (3,000 m)	8,260 ft (2,520 m)	1,800 ft (550 m)	1,200 acres (490 ha)	350 in (890 cm)	67
Diamond Peak (ski area)	Nevada	Reno	8,540 ft (2,600 m)	6,700 ft (2,000 m)	1,840 ft (560 m)	655 acres (265 ha)	325 in (830 cm)	40
Sky Tavern Ski Area	Nevada	Reno	8,238 ft (2,511 m)	7,340 ft (2,240 m)	655 ft (200 m)	200 acres (81 ha)	264 in (670 cm)	14

== See also ==
- List of California ski resorts
- Comparison of Colorado ski resorts
- Comparison of New Mexico ski resorts
- Comparison of North American ski resorts
- Comparison of Southeastern United States ski resorts
- List of ski areas and resorts in the United States
