= List of ski areas and resorts =

There are many snow ski areas and resorts around the world. At least 68 nations host snow-covered outdoor ski areas. Indoor skiing on snow is available in more than 30 nations, including Egypt and UAE.

== North America ==
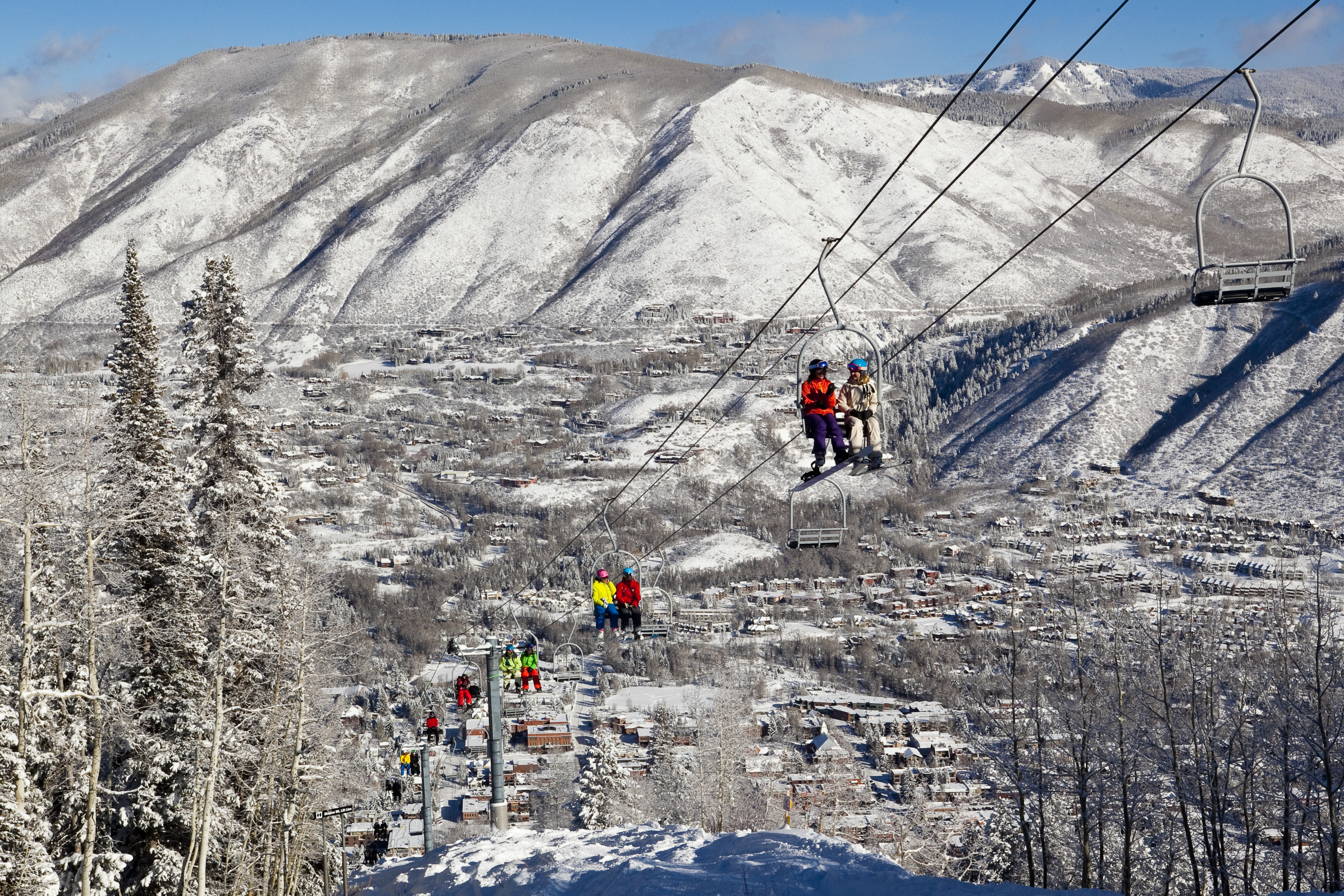
Skiers and snowboarders riding the lift on Aspen Mountain in Colorado.

See also

- Comparison of North American ski resorts
- List of California ski resorts
- List of Lake Tahoe ski resorts
- Comparison of Colorado ski resorts

== Map ==
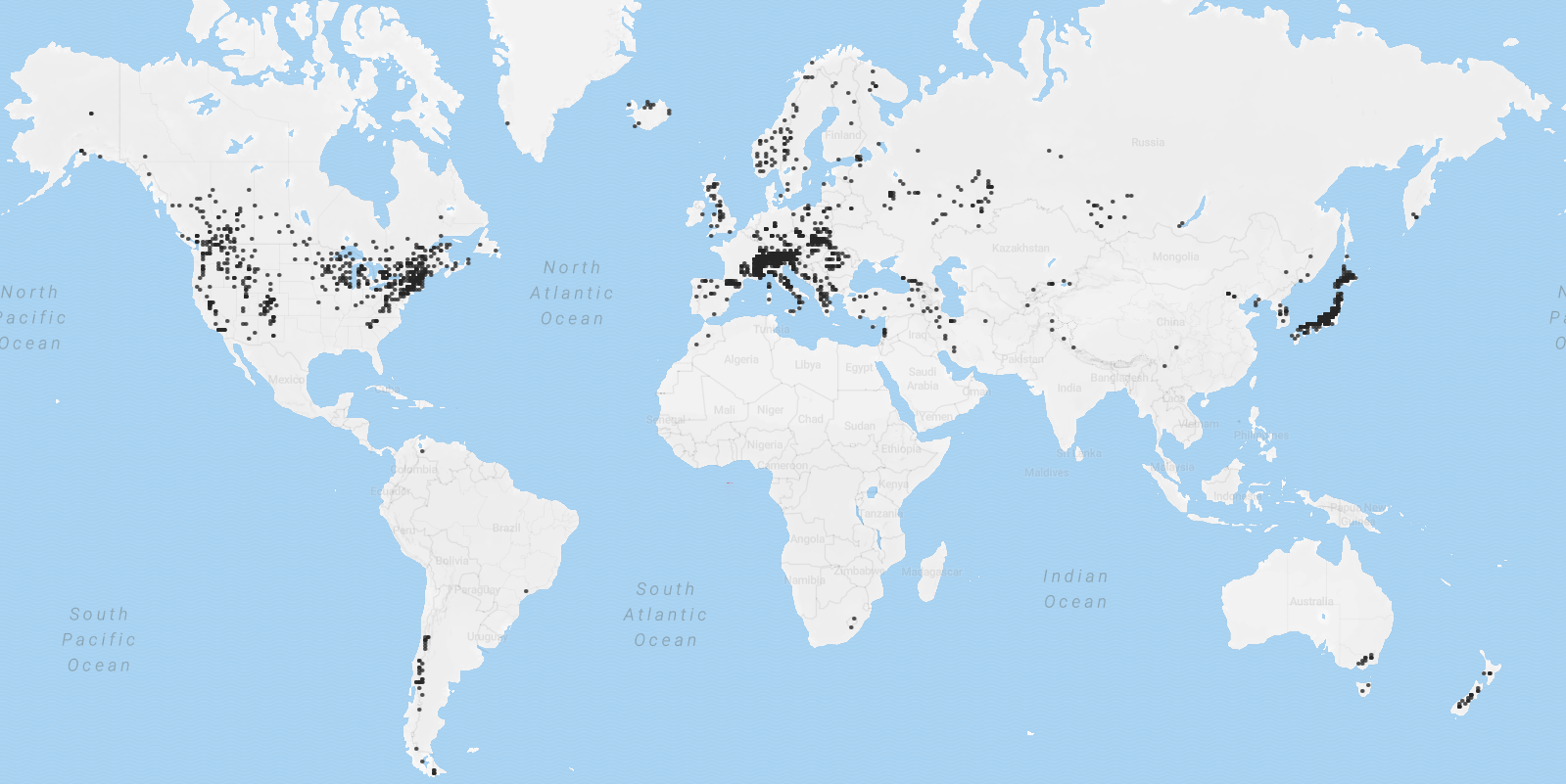
Map of world ski resorts (2019)

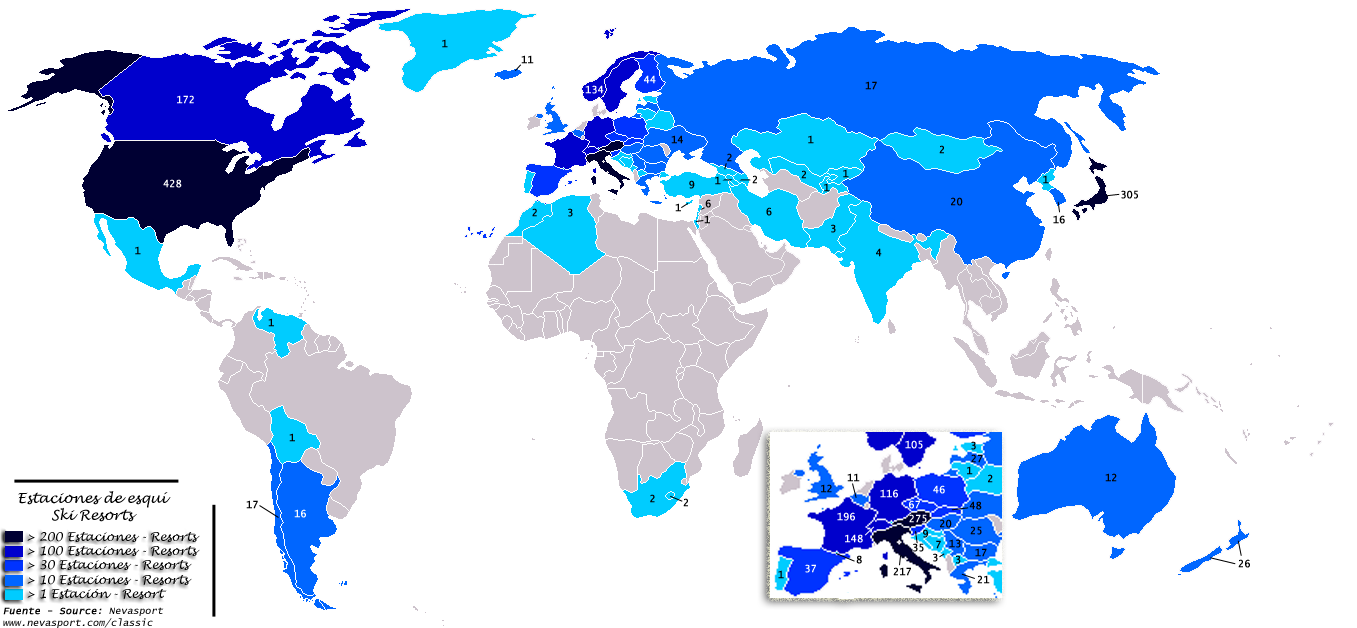
Ski resorts by countries (2008)

== Table ==
Countries by number of ski resorts
Country	Ski resorts	Slopes (km)	Ski lifts
Germany	648	1,291	1,342
Japan	559	3,053	1,827
United States	531	11,206	2,964
Austria	440	7,280	2,631
China	389	706	473
Switzerland	351	6,905	1,908
Czech Republic	317	699	942
Canada	293	4,021	915
Poland	290	530	760
Italy	286	5,665	1,865
Sweden	256	1,239	933
France	251	10,016	3,073
Russia	176	917	575
Norway	170		
Slovakia	122	449	501
Romania	100	236	169
United Kingdom	84	158	181
Finland	80	419	365
Netherlands	63	12	75
Ukraine	58	211	132
Slovenia	50	265	182
Turkey	41	366	155
New Zealand	36	409	122
Iran	34	86	67
Spain	33	1,170	346
Serbia	29	99	86
Greece	26	191	117
Bulgaria	23	232	98
Kyrgyzstan	23	100	31
Bosnia and Herzegovina	22	140	73
Andorra	3	303	123
