= List of snowiest places in the United States by state =

The list of snowiest places in the United States by state shows average annual snowfall totals for the period from mid-1985 to mid-2015. Only places in the official climate database of the National Weather Service, a service of NOAA, are included in this list. Some ski resorts and unofficial weather stations report higher amounts of snowfall than places on this list. Official weather stations are usually located in populated places and snowfall statistics for isolated and unpopulated areas are often not recorded.

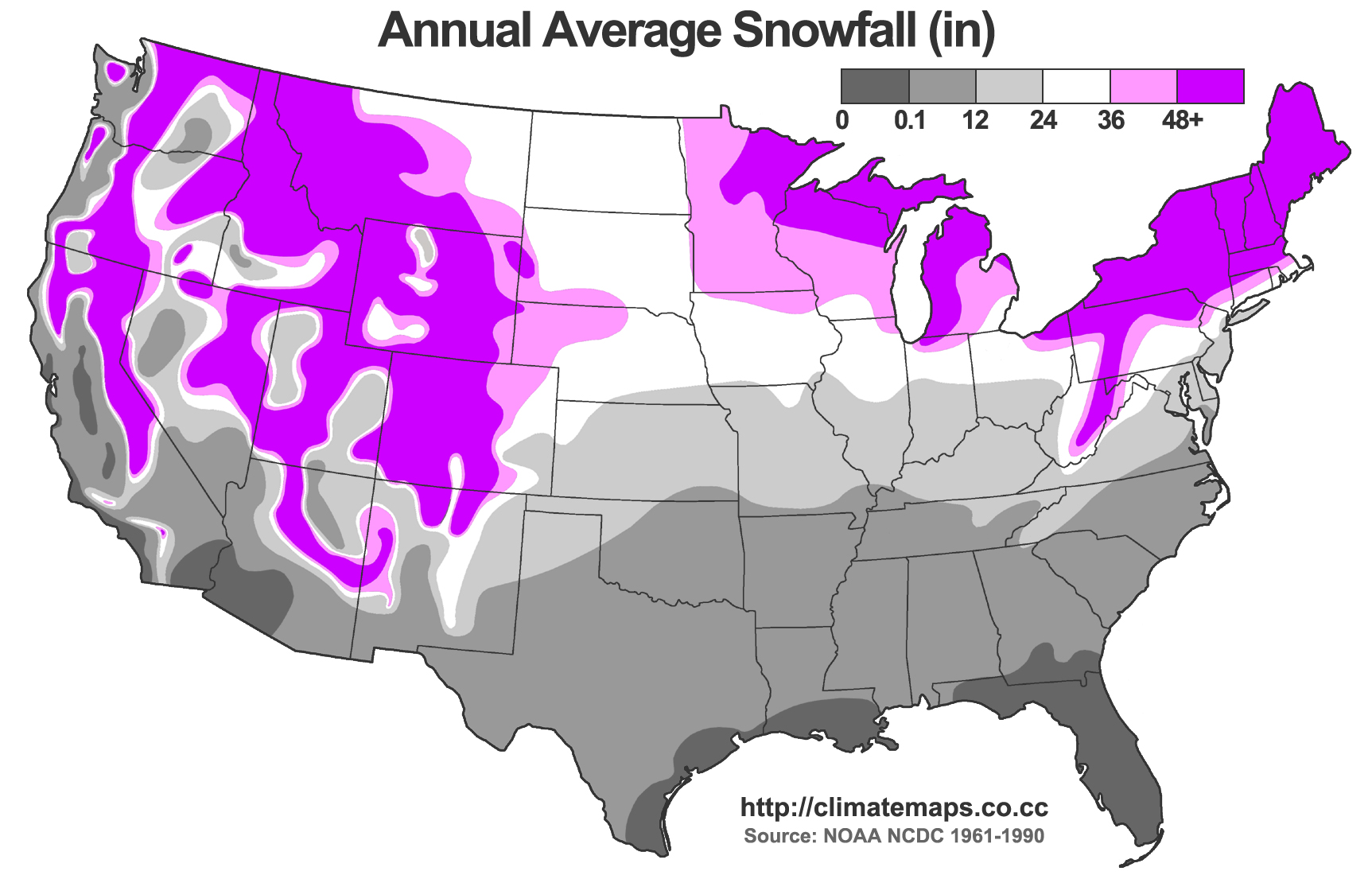
US average annual snowfall, 1961–1990

Mount Rainier and Mount Baker in Washington are the snowiest places in the United States which have weather stations, receiving 645 inches (16.4 m) annually on average. By comparison, the populated place with the highest snowfall in the world is believed to be Sukayu Onsen in the Siberian-facing Japanese Alps. Sukayu Onsen receives 694.5 inches (17.64 m) (nearly 58 feet) of snow annually. Nearby mountain slopes may receive even more.

The amount of snow received at weather stations varies substantially from year to year. For example, the annual snowfall at Paradise Ranger Station in Mount Rainier National Park has been as little as 266 inches (680 cm) in 2014–2015 and as much as 1,122 inches (2,850 cm) in 1971–1972.

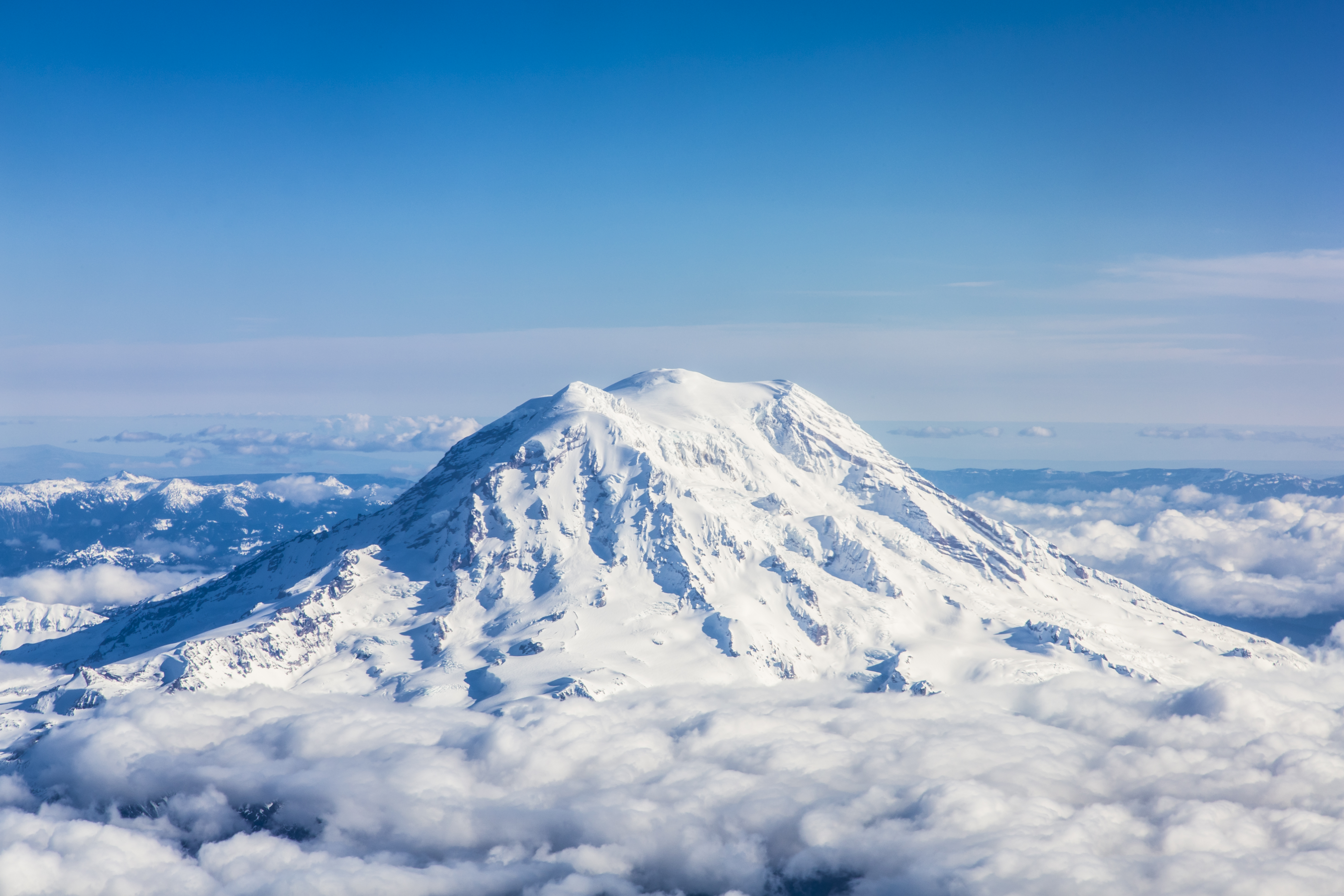
Mount Rainier

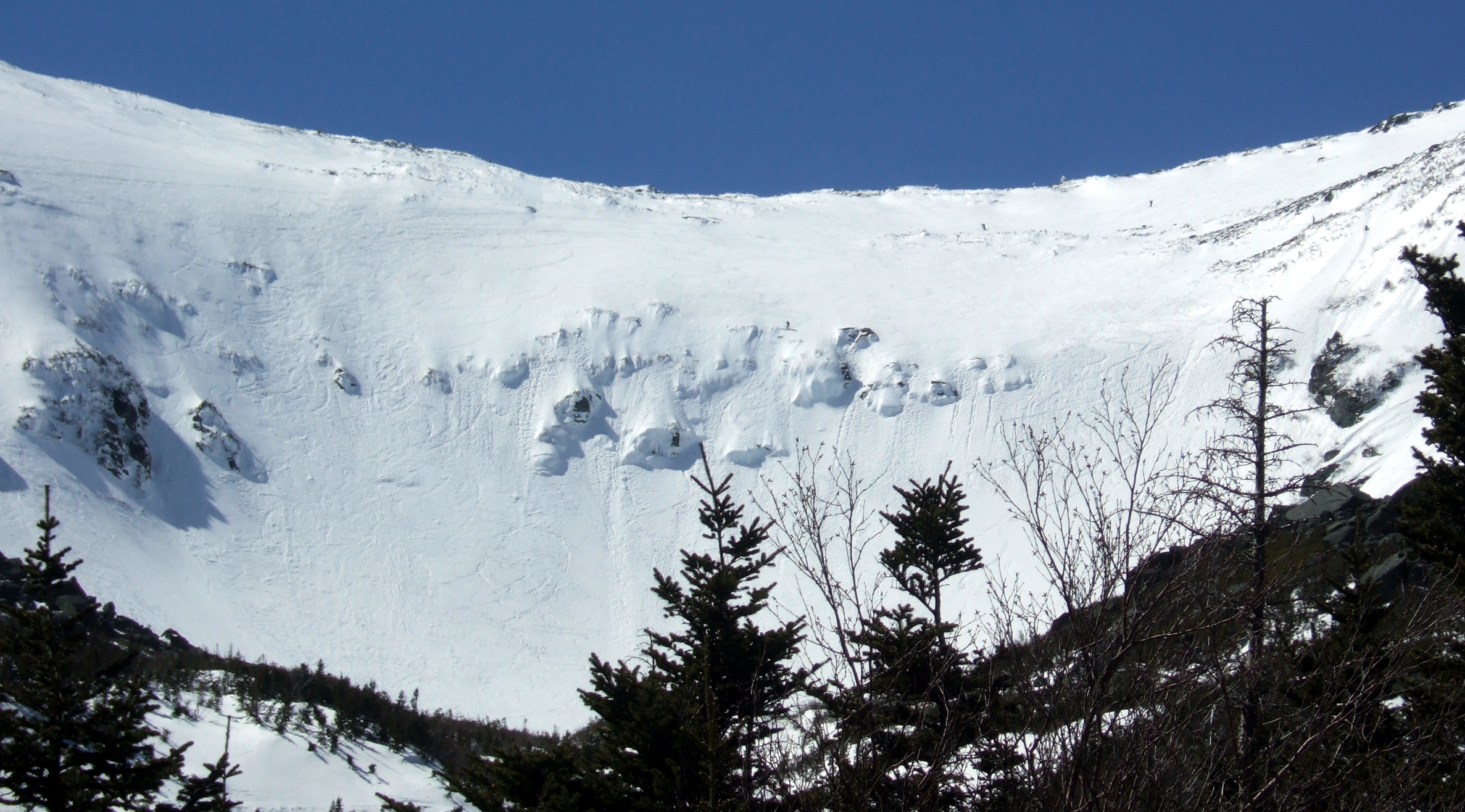
Skiing Mount Washington

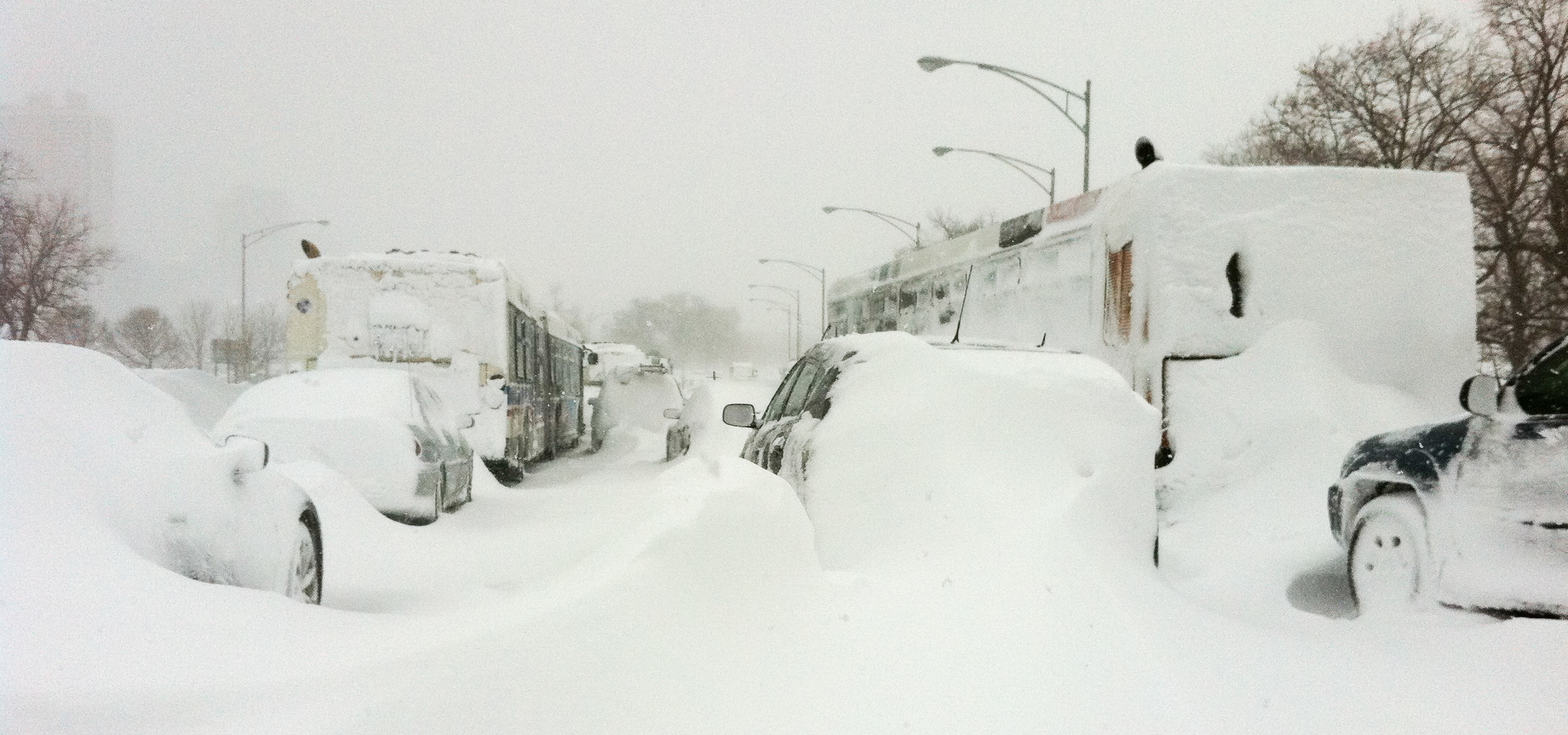
A Chicago snowstorm in 2011

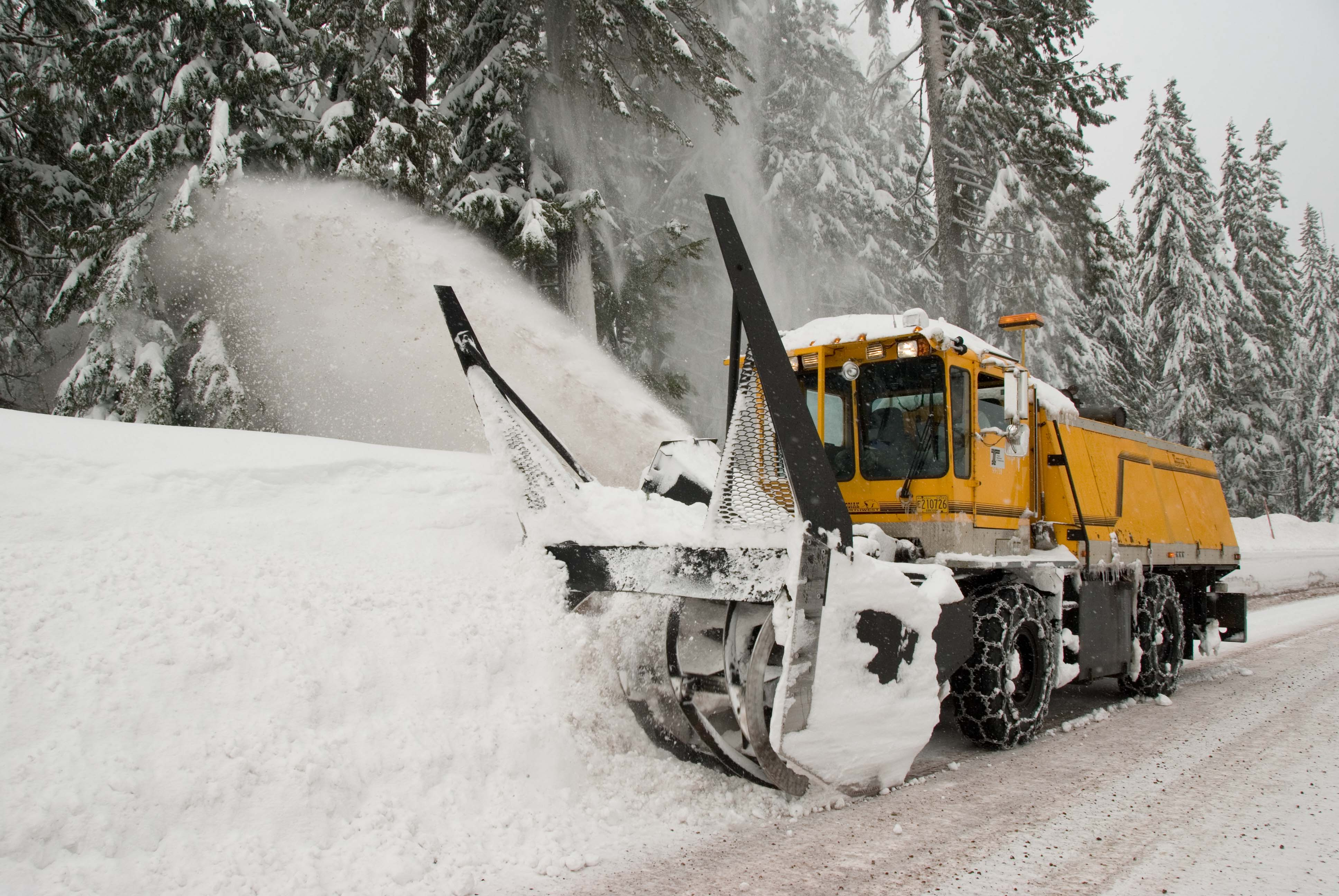
Clearing a highway after a heavy snowfall in Oregon

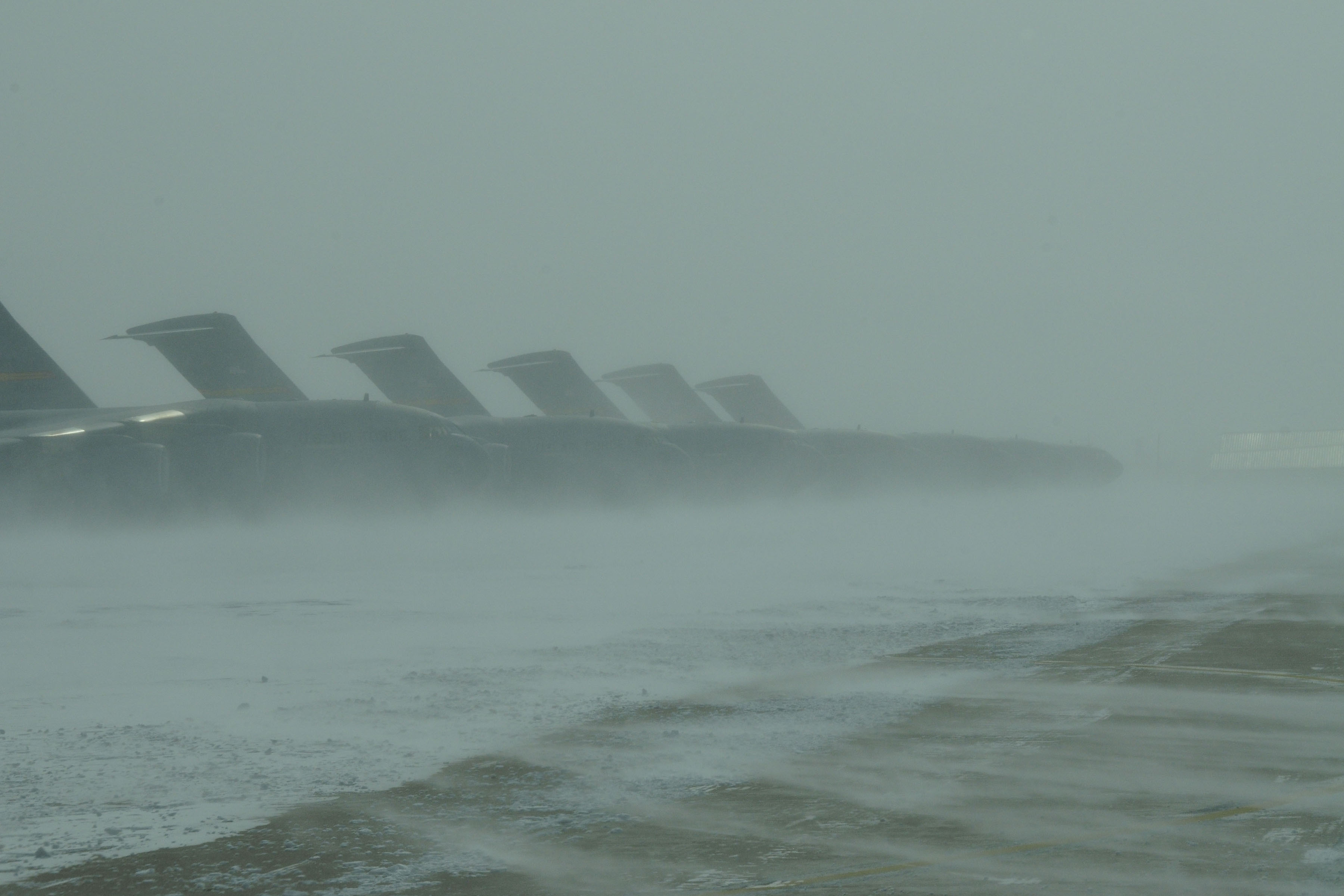
A blizzard at Altus Air Force Base in Oklahoma

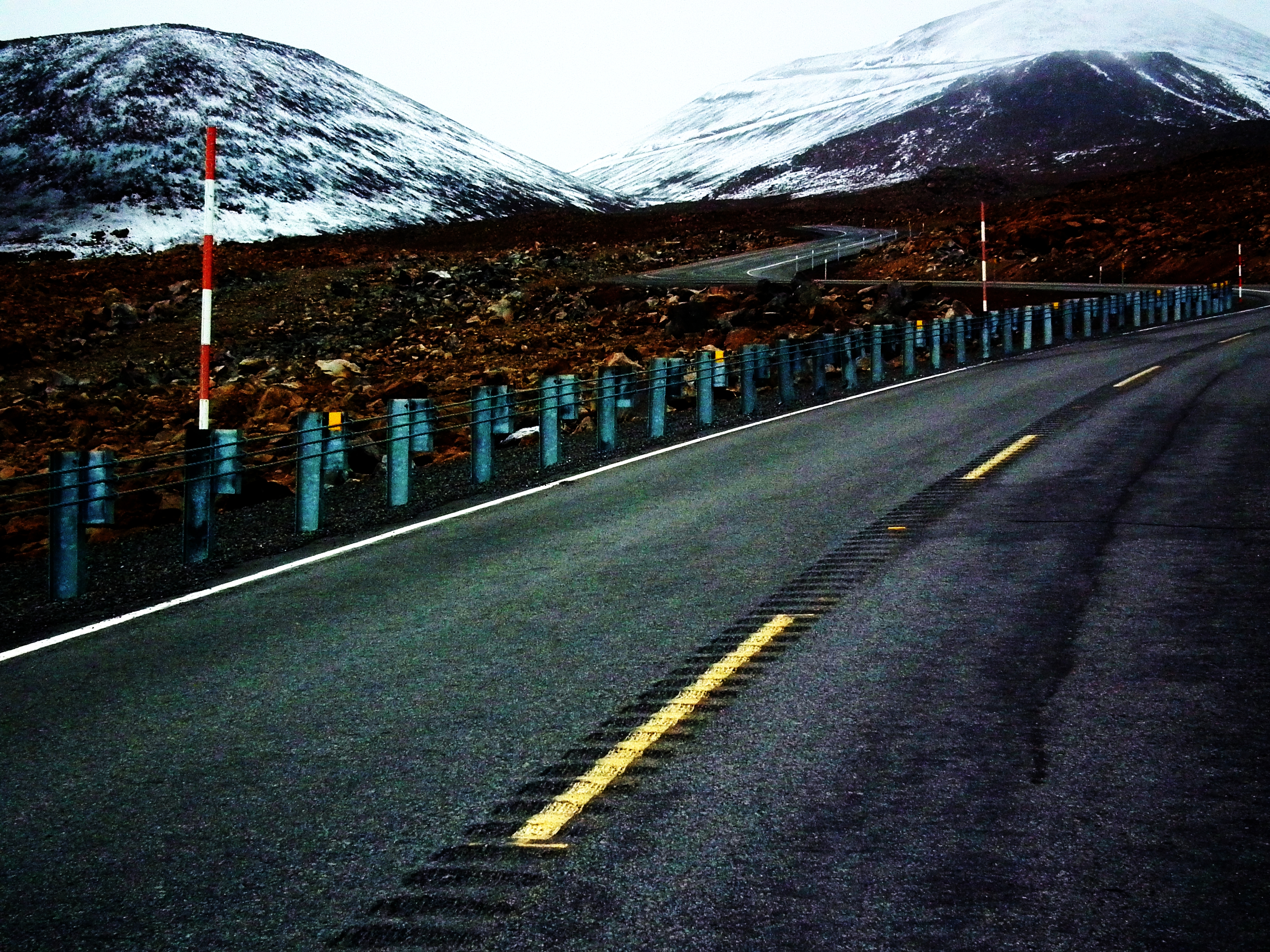
Snow on Mauna Kea, Hawaii

Weather stations with highest snowfall in the United States by state, 1985–2015
State	Place	Average annual snowfall	elevation of weather station	coordinates	Other snowy areas (limited or unofficial data) and notes
1. Washington	Paradise, Mount Rainier	645.5 inches (1,640 cm)	5,400 feet (1,600 m)	46.79°N 121.73°W	Mount Baker, 645 inches (1,640 cm) annually.
2. Oregon	Timberline Lodge Ski Area	551 inches (1,400 cm)	5,960 feet (1,820 m)	45.33°N 121.71°W	Crater Lake, 533 inches (1,350 cm) annually.
3. Utah	Alta	456.9 inches (1,161 cm)	8,730 feet (2,660 m)	40.60°N 111.64°W	Brighton Ski Resort, 411.1 inches (1,044 cm) annually.
4. California	Soda Springs	411.6 inches (1,045 cm)	6,885 feet (2,099 m)	39.32°N 120.38°W	Sugar Bowl Ski Resort 2.5 miles east of Soda Springs, 500 inches (1,300 cm) annually. Lake Helen at Mount Lassen and Kalmia Lake in the Trinity Alps are estimated to receive 600–700 inches of snow per year. Tamarack in Calaveras County holds the record for the deepest snowfall on earth (884 inches (2,250 cm)).
5. Alaska	Valdez	314.1 inches (798 cm)	95 feet (29 m)	61.13°N 146.35°W	Alyeska Resort, 669 inches (1,700 cm) annually.
6. New Hampshire	Mount Washington	282.1 inches (717 cm)	6,270 feet (1,910 m)	44.27°N 71.30°W	Elevation of weather station.
7. Colorado	Climax	273.8 inches (695 cm)	11,350 feet (3,460 m)	39.37°N 106.19°W	Wolf Creek Pass Ski Area. 387 inches (980 cm) annually.
8. Wyoming	Burgess Junction	257.8 inches (655 cm)	8,050 feet (2,450 m)	44.77°N 107.52°W	Grand Targhee Resort, 500 inches (1,300 cm) annually.
9. New York	High Market (West Turin)	214.2 inches (544 cm)	1,816 feet (554 m)	43.35°N 75.25°W	Syracuse named snowiest city in U.S., 123.8 inches (314 cm) annually.
10. Michigan	Herman	214 inches (540 cm)	1,667 feet (508 m)	46.67°N 88.37°W	
11. Vermont	Mount Mansfield	211.9 inches (538 cm)	3,866 feet (1,178 m)	44.53°N 72.82°W	Jay Peak Resort, 350 inches (890 cm) annually.
12. Idaho	Island Park	211.8 inches (538 cm)	6,298 feet (1,920 m)	44.42°N 111.37°W	Lookout Pass, 400 inches (1,000 cm) annually.
13. South Dakota	near Lead	195.9 inches (498 cm)	6,120 feet (1,870 m)	44.24°N 103.80°W	
14. Montana	Mystic Lake	184.3 inches (468 cm)	6,560 feet (2,000 m)	45.24°N 109.73°W	Cooke City, 200.7 inches (510 cm) annually. Higher totals common at Big Sky.
15. West Virginia	Terra Alta	175.0 inches (444 cm)	2,582 feet (787 m)	39.45°N 79.55°W	
16. Wisconsin	Hurley	162.2 inches (412 cm)	1,500 feet (460 m)	46.45°N 90.19°W	
17. New Mexico	Red River	151.1 inches (384 cm)	8,661 feet (2,640 m)	36.71°N 105.41°W	Taos Ski Valley, 300 inches (760 cm)
18. Maine	Eustis	123.8 inches (314 cm)	1,163 feet (354 m)	45.14°N 70.44°W	
19. Arizona	Bright Angel Ranger Station	118.4 inches (301 cm)	8,320 feet (2,540 m)	36.21°N 112.06°W	Arizona Snowbowl, 260 inches (660 cm). Sunrise Park Resort, 250 inches (640 cm). Hawley Lake 168 inches (430 cm).
20. Nevada	Wild Horse Reservoir	118.2 inches (300 cm)	6,265 feet (1,910 m)	41.67°N 115.80°W	Mount Rose Ski Tahoe, 350 in (890 cm)
21. Ohio	Chardon	109.2 inches (277 cm)	1,291 feet (393 m)	41.58°N 81.20°W	
22. Maryland	Oakland	105.9 inches (269 cm)	2,408 feet (734 m)	39.41°N 79.41°W	
23. Pennsylvania	Erie	103.0 inches (262 cm)	650 feet (200 m)	42.13°N 80.08°W	
24. North Carolina	Mount Mitchell	91 inches (230 cm)	6,684 feet (2,037 m)	35.76°N 82.27°W	
25. Minnesota	Duluth	86.5 inches (220 cm)	651 feet (198 m)	46.79°N 92.10°W	
26. Tennessee	Mount Le Conte	82.9 inches (211 cm)	6,345 feet (1,934 m)	35.66°N 83.44°W	
27. Connecticut	Norfolk	77 inches (200 cm)	1,167 feet (356 m)	41.99°N 73.20°W	
28. Massachusetts	Ashburnham	75.1 inches (191 cm)	1,028 feet (313 m)	42.64°N 71.91°W	
29. Indiana	South Bend	66.8 inches (170 cm)	752 feet (229 m)	41.68°N 86.25°W	
30. Rhode Island	North Foster	60.4 inches (153 cm)	707 feet (215 m)	41.85°N 71.76°W	
31. Virginia	Wise	52.7 inches (134 cm)	2,436 feet (742 m)	36.98°N 82.58°W	
32. North Dakota	Fargo	51.6 inches (131 cm)	903 feet (275 m)	46.88°N 96.79°W	
33. Nebraska	Harrisburg	46.5 inches (118 cm)	4,492 feet (1,369 m)	41.56°N 103.74°W	
34. Iowa	Dubuque	42.5 inches (108 cm)	708 feet (216 m)	42.50°N 90.66°W	
35. New Jersey	Sussex	41.2 inches (105 cm)	500 feet (150 m)	41.21°N 74.61°W	
36. Illinois	Chicago	38.5 inches (98 cm)	858 feet (262 m)	41.88°N 87.63°W	
37. Kansas	McDonald	37.6 inches (96 cm)	3,364 feet (1,025 m)	39.78°N 101.37°W	
38. Kentucky	Closplint	31.7 inches (81 cm)	1,551 feet (473 m)	36.90°N 83.07°W	
39. Oklahoma	Boise City	30.8 inches (78 cm)	4,175 feet (1,273 m)	36.73°N 102.51°W	
40. Missouri	Edina	22.0 inches (56 cm)	795 feet (242 m)	40.17°N 92.17°W	
41. Delaware	Wilmington	21.9 inches (56 cm)	114 feet (35 m)	39.24°N 75.55°W	
42. Texas	Stratford	20.2 inches (51 cm)	3,699 feet (1,127 m)	36.34°N 102.07°W	
43. Arkansas	Gravette	16.0 inches (41 cm)	1,211 feet (369 m)	36.42°N 94.45°W	
44. South Carolina	Caesars Head	7.2 inches (18 cm)	3,180 feet (970 m)	35.11°N 82.63°W	Elevation of weather station
45. Alabama	Valley Head	6.1 inches (15 cm)	1,043 feet (318 m)	34.56°N 85.61°W	
46. Georgia	Dallas	3.8 inches (9.7 cm)	994 feet (303 m)	33.93°N 84.84°W	Highest peaks in Appalachian Mountains get ca. 35 inches (89 cm) annually.
47. Mississippi	Hickory Flat	2.9 inches (7.4 cm)	435 feet (133 m)	34.62°N 89.19°W	
48. Louisiana	Shreveport	0.8 inches (2.0 cm)	225 feet (69 m)	32.51°N 93.75°W	
49. Florida	Milton	0.2 inches (0.51 cm)	9 feet (2.7 m)	30.63°N 87.04°W	
50. Hawaii	–	0.0 inches (0 cm)	–	–	Occasional snow above 6,200 feet (1,900 m) elevation. The Mauna Loa Observatory – at an elevation of 11,150 feet (3,400 m) – averages 3.7 inches (9.4 cm) of snow per year.
