= Royal Gorge Cross Country Ski Resort =

Largest ski-resort in North America

Coordinates: 39°18′48.16″N 120°23′21.02″W

Royal Gorge Cross Country Ski Resort is the largest cross-country ski resort in North America. Located in Soda Springs, California, the resort offers 137 trails and 159.6 kilometres (99.2 mi) of skiable terrain, as well as 8 warming huts across the area's 6000 acres.

Royal Gorge Resort offers accommodations and dining locations at its sister resort, the nearby Sugar Bowl. Additional accommodations can be found at Donner Ski Ranch on Donner Summit, and at the Rainbow Lodge, positioned about 7 miles west of Soda Springs along the Yuba River.
