= Sky Tavern Ski Area =

Ski area in Nevada, United States

Coordinates: 39.337322°N 119.876012°W

Sky Tavern
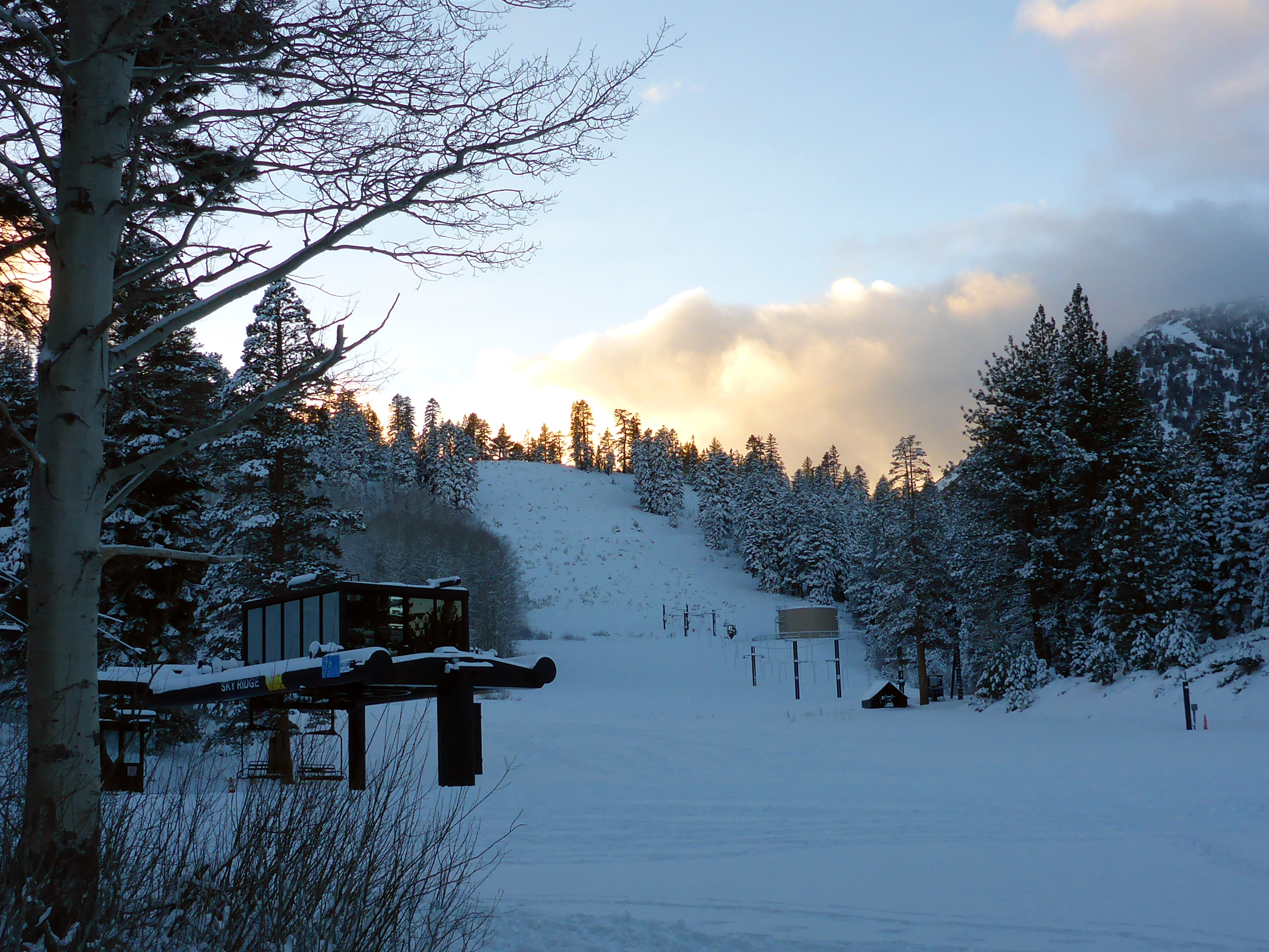
- Sunset at the Sky Tavern ski area
- Interactive map of Sky Tavern
- Location: Nevada
- Nearest city: Reno, Nevada
- Vertical: 900 feet (275 m)
- Top elevation: 8,240 feet (2,510 m)
- Base elevation: 7,340 feet (2,235 m)
- Skiable area: 200 acres (81 ha)
- Trails: 14
- Longest run: 0.7 miles (1.1 km)
- Website: https://www.skytavern.org

Sky Tavern is a home to the oldest non-profit ski and snowboard training facility in Americaski resort in Nevada, United States. It is located in the Sierra Nevada mountains, between Lake Tahoe and Reno.

== Location ==
The resort is located on Mt. Rose Highway, 20 miles from Reno. 21130 Mt. Rose Hwy Reno, Nevada 89511

== History ==
Marce Herz starts the Reno Junior Ski Program at Sky Tavern in 1948, it has become home to the oldest non-profit ski and snowboard training facility in America.

Prior to 1948, it was run as the "UP-Ski" by Wayne Poulson and Ed Heath. The area was known as Grass Lake. 1937 saw the first UNR Winter Carnival at Grass Lake.

In 1941 Keston L. Ramsey & Carlisle M. Ramsey purchase Sky Tavern from Robinson & Carlotta Neeman.

1944 saw Robinson Neeman opening Sky Tavern with a T-Bar and a small rope tow.

In 1945 Keston L. Ramsey purchases Sky Tavern from Robinson Neeman and adds 3 rope tows. Sky Tavern blossomed when Keston and Carlisle Ramsey opened the resort in December 1945. Their goal was to promote the many benefits of skiing that they enjoyed: Its physical exuberance, emotional release, and sense of pure freedom. In December, Kenston Ramsey and George Tett open a hotel.

In 1991 the City of Reno turned over operations of Sky Tavern to a non-profit group created spacifically to continue on the work of teach children to ski in Northern Nevada. At that time there were three Poma Lifts and one small rope tow.

On May 5, 1994 the Sky Ridge chair was installed. This would allow the instruction of snowboarders for the first time.

2001 saw the installation of a second chair lift, "America".

In 2021, Sky Tavern was awarded the National Ski Areas Association Conversation Cup which “recognizes the best ski area programs aimed at bringing in first-time guests and converting them into lifelong participants.”

The ski area is also well known for its adaptive ski program for children with learning and/or physical disabilities. There are five PSIA adaptive instructors that volunteer to coach those children.

== Terrain ==
With a Base Elevation of 7,340' there are 200 skiable acres. The summit elevation is 8,240'. There are two chairlifts that are used for skiing and summer activities.

== Snowfall ==
The average yearly snowfall for Sky Tavern is 264 in (670 cm).

== See also ==
- List of ski areas and resorts in the United States
- Comparison of North American ski resorts
- List of Lake Tahoe ski resorts
