= Soda Springs Mountain Resort =

Ski area in California, United States

Coordinates: 39.3213°N 120.3802°W

- Interactive map of Soda Springs Mountain Resort
- Location: California
- Nearest city: Soda Springs, California
- Vertical: 652 feet (200 m)
- Top elevation: 7,352 feet (2,240 m)
- Base elevation: 6,700 feet (2,040 m)
- Skiable area: 200 acres (81 ha)
- Trails: 19; 53% Easier; 16% More difficult 32% Most Difficult
- Longest run: 0.4 miles (0.64 km)
- Snowfall: 232 in (590 cm)
- Website: https://www.skisodasprings.com

Soda Springs Mountain Resort (commonly known as Soda Springs) is a ski resort in California, United States. It is located in the Sierra Nevada mountains, near to Lake Tahoe.

Soda Springs is the longest continuously operating ski resort in California.

== Location ==
The resort is located one mile off Interstate 80 at Soda Springs, Nevada County, California.

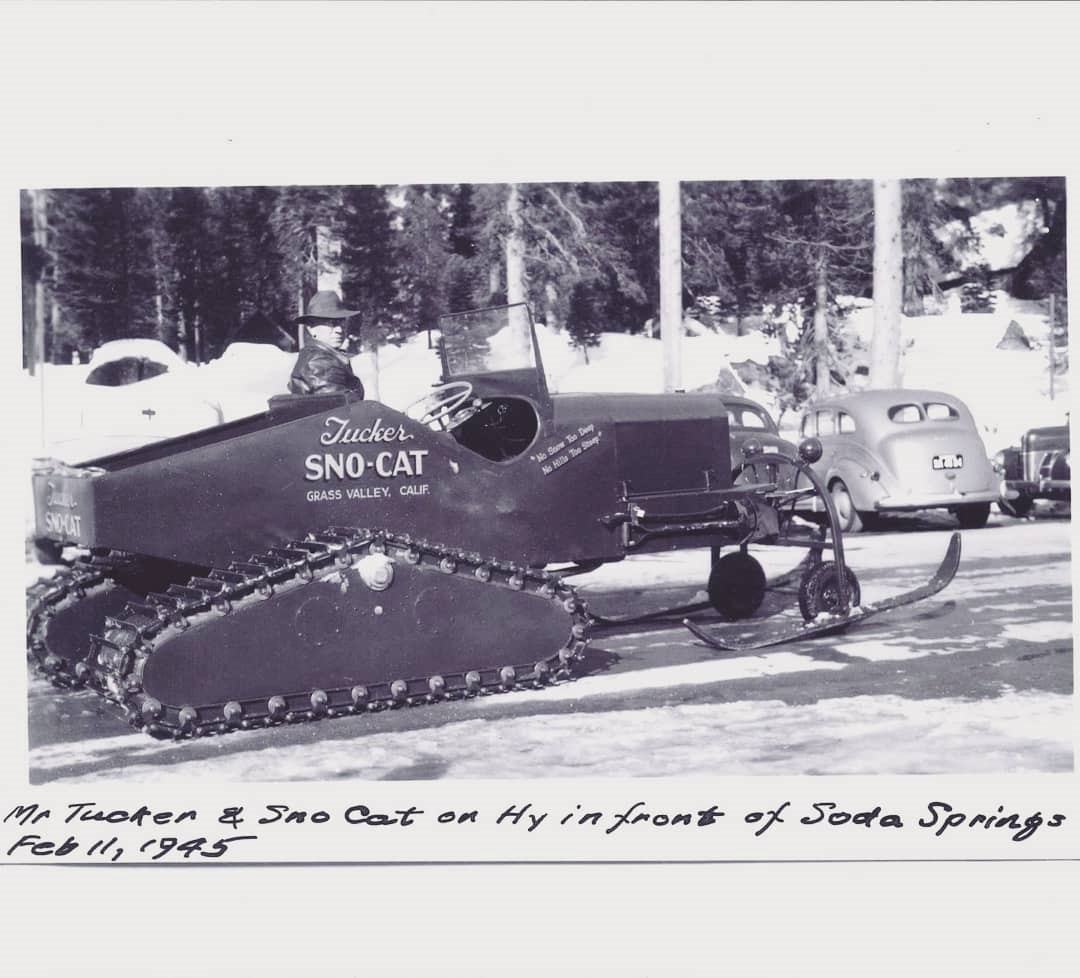
A Sno-Cat being operated at Soda Springs in 1945.

== History ==
Soda Springs is one of America's original ski resorts, first established in 1929 as Beacon Hill. It is the oldest continually operating ski resort in California.

== Terrain ==
Description of terrain

Soda Springs features 19 trails, and the resort encompasses 200 acres (81 ha). The longest trail is 0.4 mi (0.64 km). The base elevation of the resort is 6,700 ft (2,000 m), and the summit is 7,352 ft (2,241 m).

Terrain types:

- 53% Beginner Green
- 16% Intermediate Blue
- 32% Advanced Black

== Snowfall ==
The average yearly snowfall for Soda Springs is 232 in (590 cm).

== See also ==
- List of ski areas and resorts in the United States
- Comparison of North American ski resorts
- List of Lake Tahoe ski resorts
