= Mount Rose Ski Tahoe =

Ski area in Nevada, United States

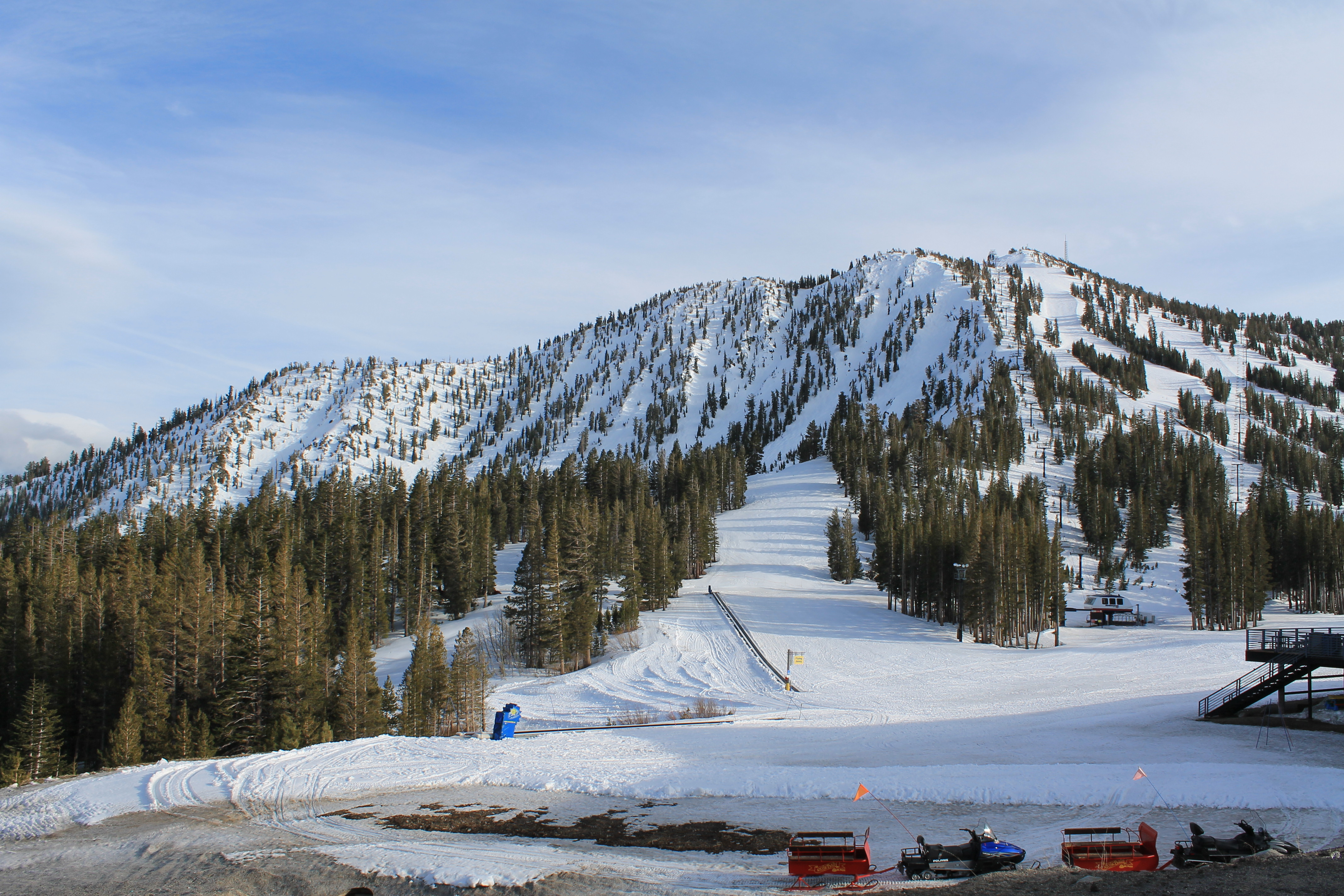
- Main base, before replacement of the Lakeview triple (right hand chairlift) with Lakeview Express

- Location in Nevada Location in the United States
- Location: Nevada
- Nearest city: Reno - 30 miles (50 km)
- Coordinates: 39°19′45″N 119°53′09″W
- Vertical: 1,800 feet (550 m)
- Top elevation: 9,700 feet (2,955 m)
- Base elevation: 8,260 feet (2,520 m)
- Skiable area: 1,200 acres (4.9 km^{2})
- Trails: 70+ 20% beginner 30% intermediate 40% advanced 10% expert
- Longest run: 2.5 miles (4.0 km)
- Snowfall: 350 in (29.2 ft; 8.9 m)
- Night skiing: No
- Website: skirose.com

Mount Rose Ski Tahoe (commonly known as Mount Rose) is a ski resort in Nevada, United States. The resort is situated in the Sierra Nevada mountains, near to Reno, Incline Village, and Lake Tahoe.

Despite the name, the resort is actually on the slopes of Slide Mountain rather than Mount Rose, which is on the other side of Nevada State Route 431. The resort is known for having the highest base elevation of any ski resort in the Lake Tahoe region, at 8,260 ft (2,520 m).

== Location ==
The resort is located about twenty-five miles south south-west (40 km) of Reno, Nevada, making it the closest resort to the city. Mount Rose is also about 11 miles (18 km) from Incline Village, Nevada (North Lake Tahoe), making it accessible to those traveling from Reno and Lake Tahoe.

== History ==
The resort opened 73 years ago in 1953 as the "Reno Ski Bowl" on the east face of Slide Mountain.

The inaugural NCAA Skiing Championships were held at the resort in March 1954. The event was hosted by the University of Nevada, with the downhill competition won by Wolf Pack senior Pat Meyers.

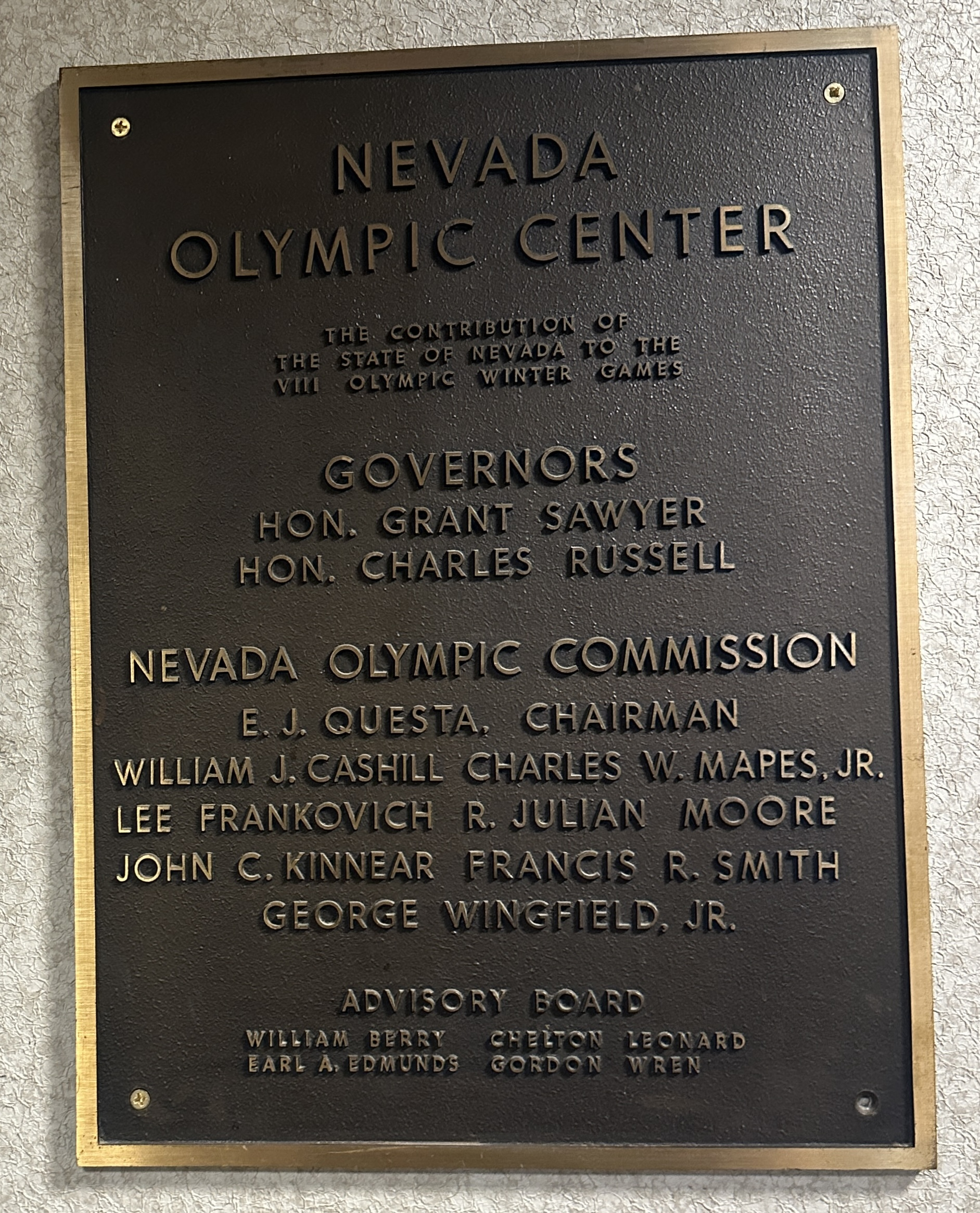
A plaque in the Mount Rose lodge which commemorates Nevada's contribution to the 1960 Winter Olympics.

In 1959, the resort was chosen as an alternate site for the 1960 Winter Olympics Downhill event, which was to be held at Palisades Tahoe. It was chosen as an alternate site as there were concerns that Palisades may not receive enough snow. An official FIS Downhill run and additional facilities were constructed, but never needed because Palisades received sufficient snow to host the event. A plaque commemorates this Olympic history in the lodge.

Renamed to the "Slide Mountain Ski Area", it operated side-by-side with the "Mount Rose Ski Area", which opened in 1964 on the mountain's north side; the two areas merged in 1987.

December 2004 saw the opening of The Chutes at Mount Rose, which offer some of the steepest and most consistent terrain in all of Tahoe.

In 2022, the Lakeview Express lift opened after a $7.5 million capital improvement project, the largest investment in the resort's history. The lift replaced the old and slow Lakeview triple chair.

The ski resort was threatened by the Davis Fire that burned from September 7 to 25, so sprinklers were set up at the base lodges. Important assets were relocated.

== Terrain ==
=== Description of terrain ===
Mount Rose Ski Tahoe features over 70 trails, and the resort encompasses some 1,200 acres. The longest trail is 2.5 miles. The base elevation of the resort is 8,260 feet (2,520 m), and the summit is 9,700 feet (3,000 m).

The resort is composed of two areas, the Slide side and the Rose side. Before the two sides merged, they operated as independent resorts until 1987. Both sides have their own parking and lodge. Both lodges feature a bar, food options, and restrooms. The lodge on the Rose side also handles rentals and lessons.

The Slide side is home to blue, black, and double black trails. It is served by two chairlifts. The Rose side is home to all of the beginner terrain at the resort, in addition to blue, black, and double black trails.

Terrain types:

- 20% Beginner Green
- 30% Intermediate Blue
- 40% Advanced Black
- 10% Expert Double Black - The Chutes

Mount Rose also features two terrain parks: Pondo park and Doubledown. Pondo park is located on Ponderosa trail on the Rose side, and Doubledown is located off of the Minetrain trail on the Slide side.

=== Conditions ===
Mount Rose has the highest base elevation of a Tahoe-region ski area. This means that the resort often receives some of the areas first snowfall, and benefits greatly from snowstorms. Mount Rose usually enjoys high-quality snow for Tahoe, and the resort’s altitude helps with snow preservation. The downside of the resort’s high elevation and exposed footprint is that it has high wind exposure, which can sometimes result in wind holds and a degradation in snow quality, as well as unpleasant conditions for guests on windy days.

=== Slide side chairlifts ===
Name	Type	Year	Make	Vertical	Length	Capacity per hour	General terrain
Zephyr Express	Detachable six-pack	2004	Doppelmayr USA	397 m (1,302 ft)	1,200 metres (3,900 ft)	3,600	//
Chuter	Fixed-grip quad	2004	CTEC	160 m (520 ft)	719 metres (2,359 ft)	2,400	Returns from the base of the Chutes to Winters Creek Lodge.

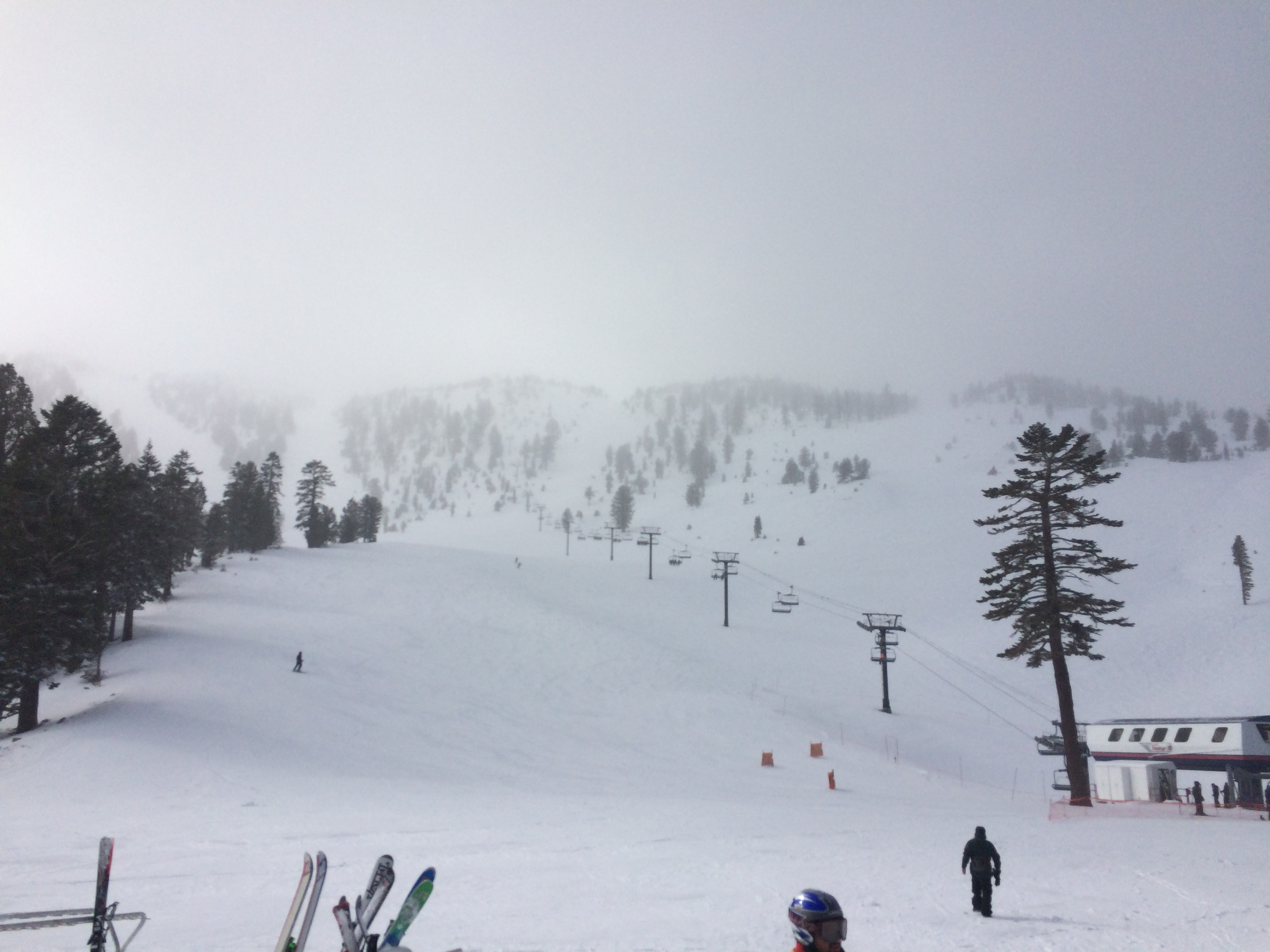
A view of the Zephyr Express on the Slide side.

=== Rose side chairlifts ===
Name	Type	Year	Make	Vertical	Length	Capacity per hour	General terrain
Northwest Express	Detachable six-pack	2000	Garaventa	401 m (1,316 ft)	1,208 metres (3,963 ft)	3,000	//
Lakeview Express	Detachable quad	2022	Leitner-Poma	285 m (935 ft)	1,150 metres (3,770 ft)	2,400	/
Wizard	Fixed-grip quad	2015		88 m (289 ft)	728 metres (2,388 ft)	2,400	
Galena	Fixed-grip triple	1984	Yan Lifts	118 m (387 ft)	863 metres (2,831 ft)	1,800	
Magic	Carpet	2017	Sunkid				
Little Mule	Carpet	2017	Sunkid				

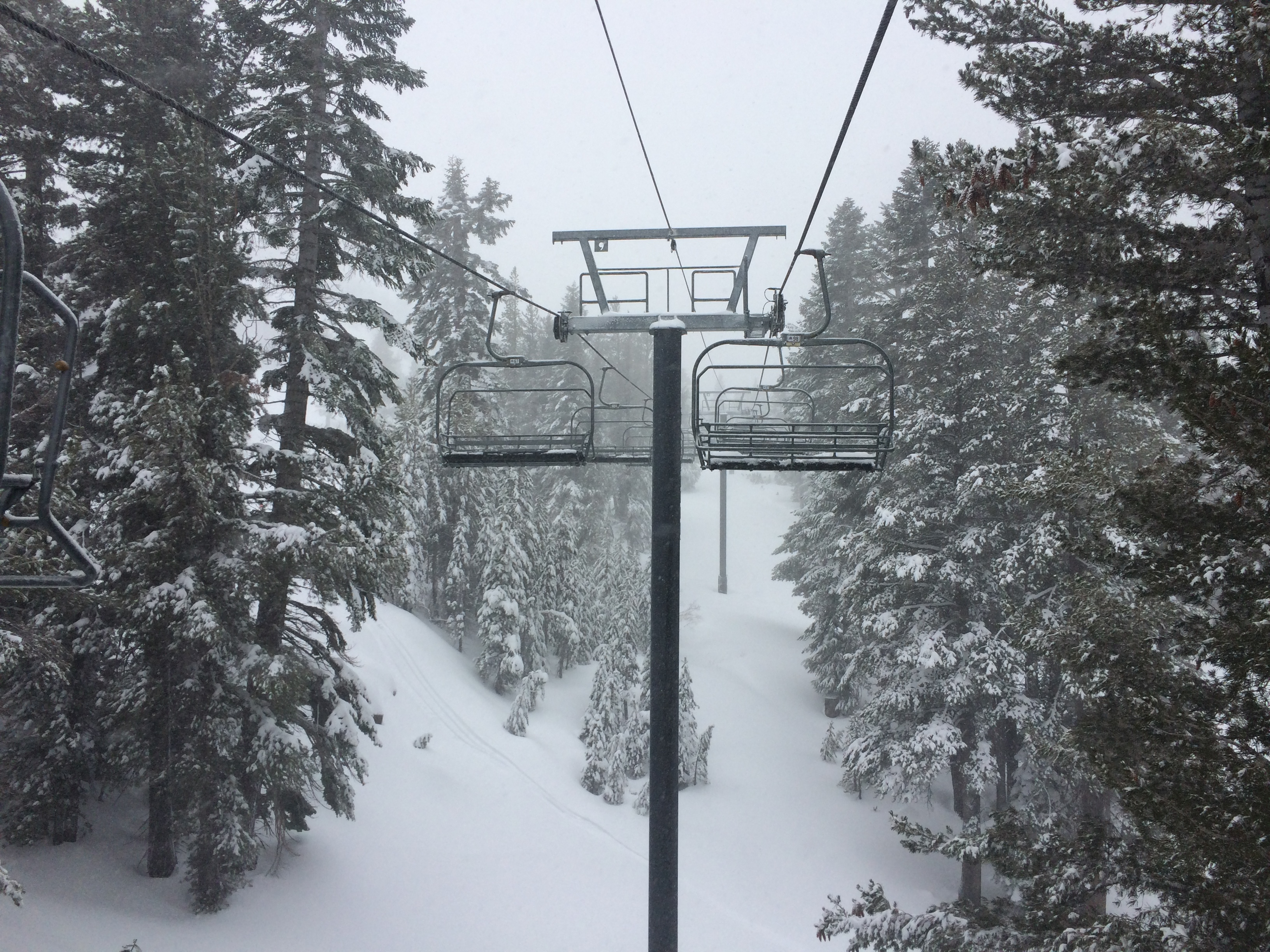
A view from the Wizard chairlift.

== Gallery ==
Images of Mount Rose Ski Tahoe
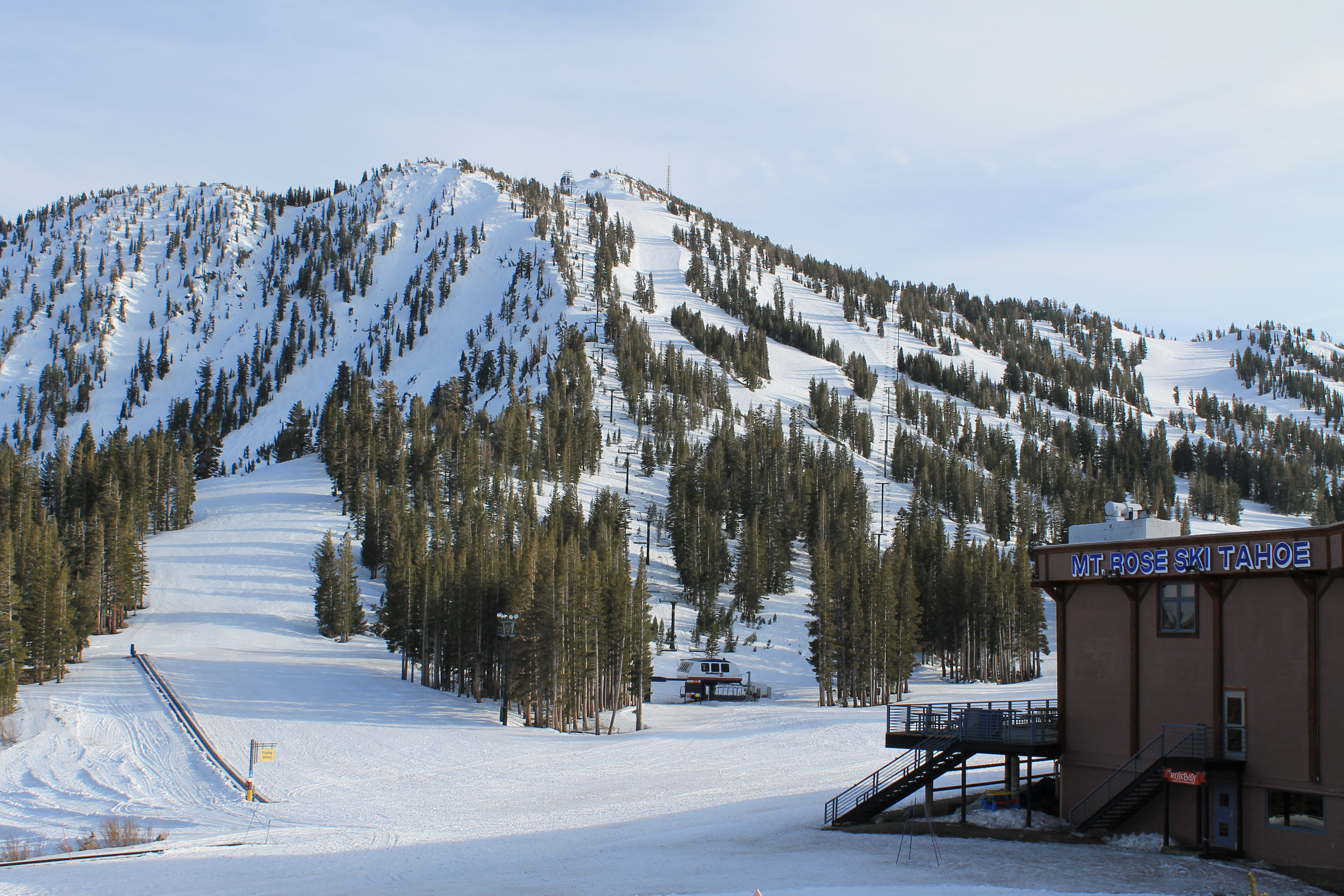
A view of the Rose side from the main lodge.

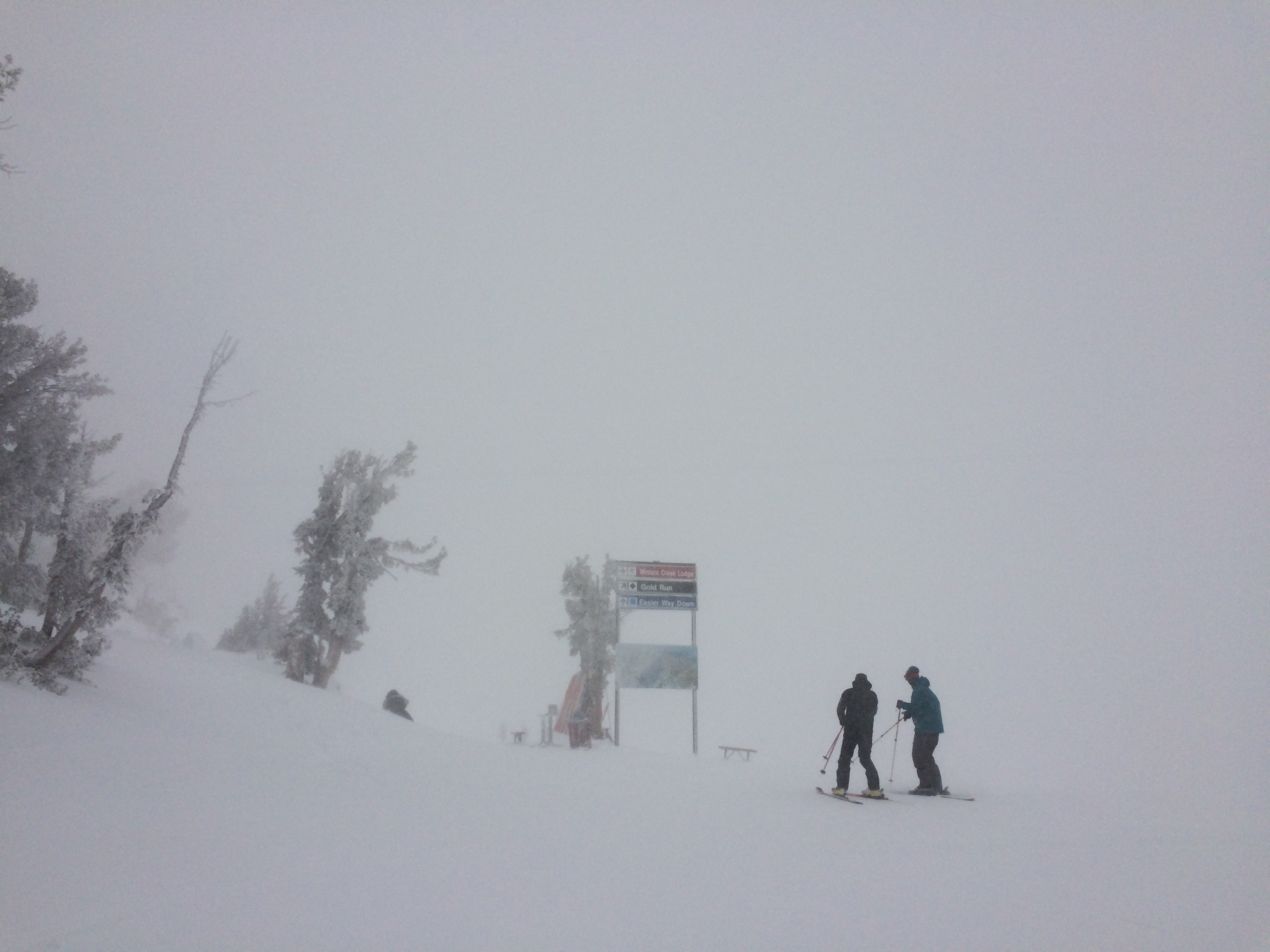
Fresh snow at Mount Rose.

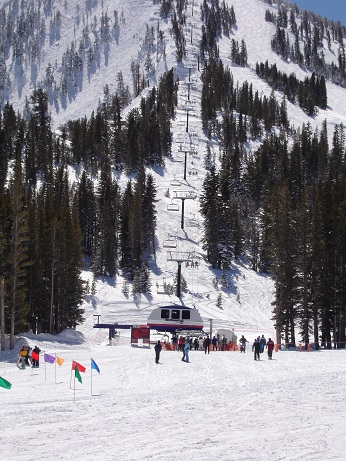
The Zephyr Express.

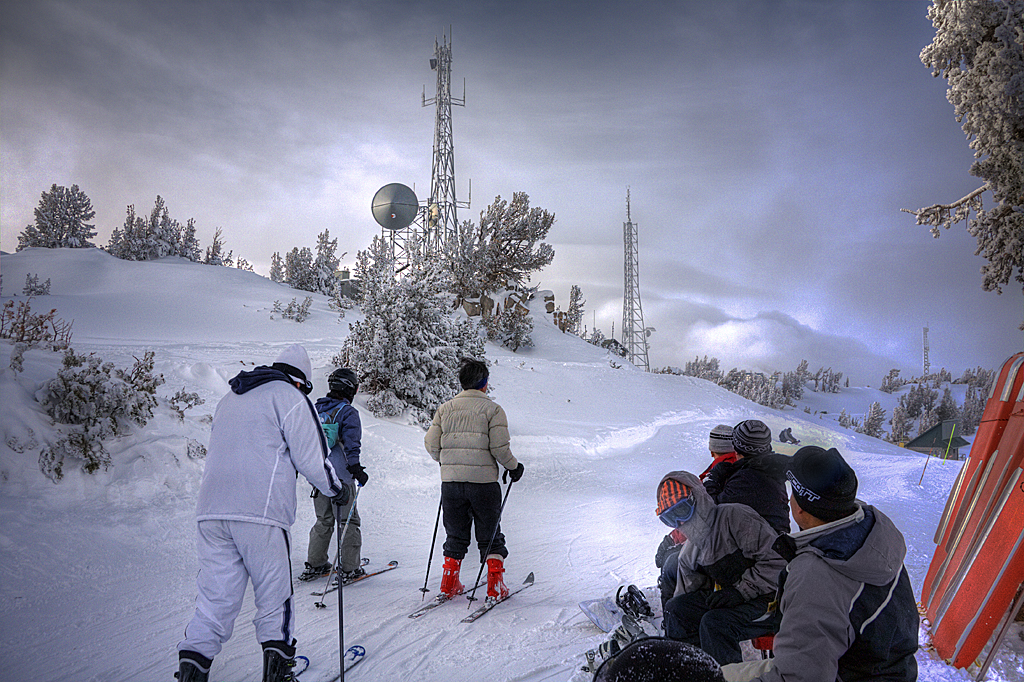
Near the summit of Slide Mountain.

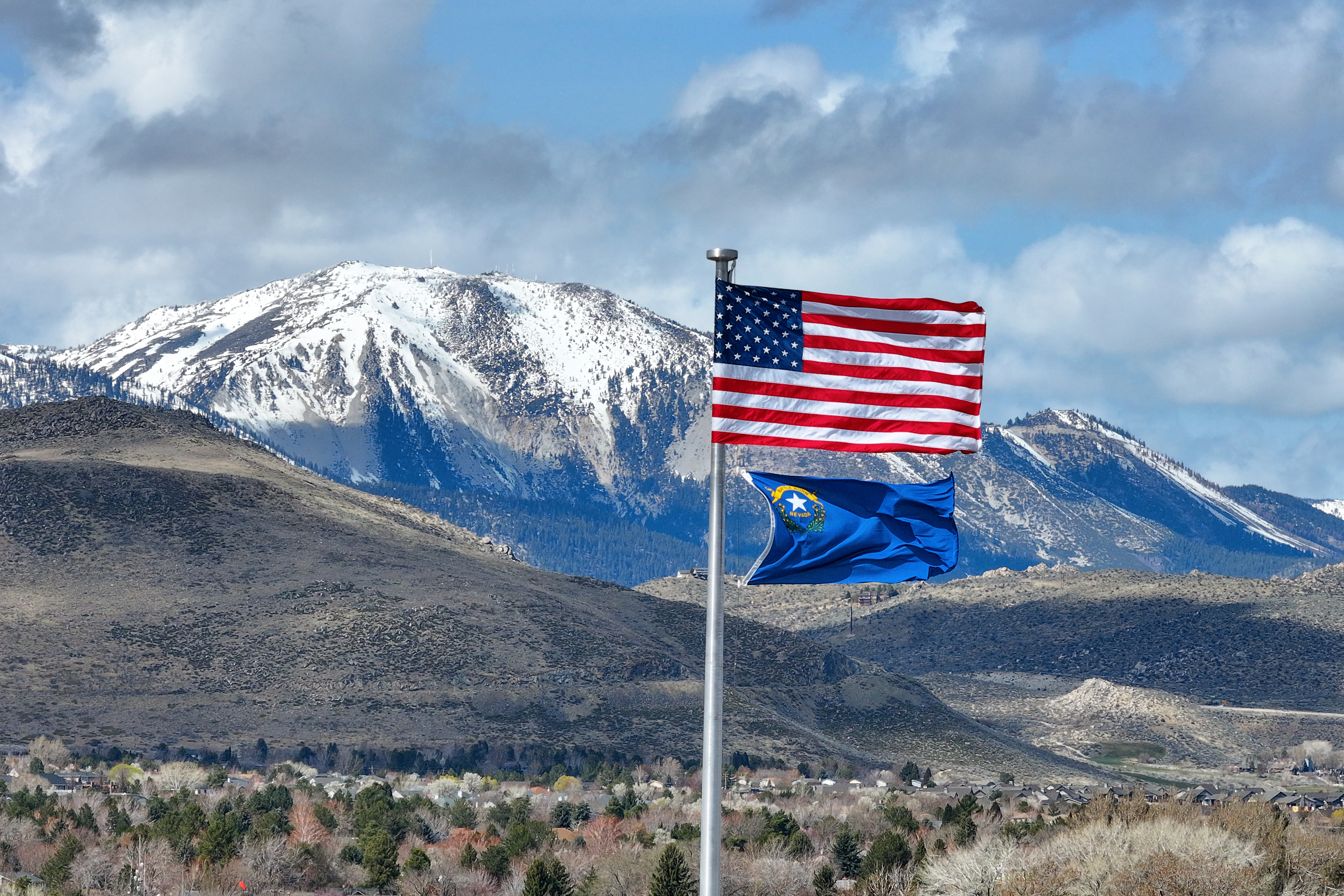
Slide Mountain viewable from the Nevada State Capitol

== Snowfall ==
The average yearly snowfall for Mount Rose is 350 inches (890 cm). Mount Rose Ski Area has a dry summer subarctic climate (Köppen Dsc).

Climate data for Mount Rose Ski Area, Nevada, 1991–2020 normals: 8801ft (2683m)
Month	Jan	Feb	Mar	Apr	May	Jun	Jul	Aug	Sep	Oct	Nov	Dec	Year
Mean daily maximum °F (°C)	36.2 (2.3)	35.8 (2.1)	39.8 (4.3)	43.6 (6.4)	51.2 (10.7)	59.9 (15.5)	69.1 (20.6)	67.9 (19.9)	61.6 (16.4)	51.1 (10.6)	41.2 (5.1)	34.9 (1.6)	49.4 (9.6)
Daily mean °F (°C)	28.5 (−1.9)	27.5 (−2.5)	30.5 (−0.8)	33.8 (1.0)	41.5 (5.3)	49.9 (9.9)	58.8 (14.9)	57.8 (14.3)	51.6 (10.9)	42.2 (5.7)	33.4 (0.8)	27.5 (−2.5)	40.3 (4.6)
Mean daily minimum °F (°C)	20.8 (−6.2)	19.2 (−7.1)	21.1 (−6.1)	24.0 (−4.4)	31.9 (−0.1)	39.8 (4.3)	48.5 (9.2)	47.7 (8.7)	41.6 (5.3)	33.3 (0.7)	25.4 (−3.7)	20.1 (−6.6)	31.1 (−0.5)
Average precipitation inches (mm)	9.58 (243)	9.35 (237)	8.15 (207)	4.21 (107)	2.65 (67)	1.16 (29)	0.32 (8.1)	0.27 (6.9)	0.47 (12)	2.88 (73)	5.23 (133)	10.27 (261)	54.54 (1,384)
Average extreme snow depth inches (cm)	85 (220)	105 (270)	118 (300)	105 (270)	77 (200)	32 (81)	5 (13)	0 (0)	0 (0)	8 (20)	25 (64)	61 (150)	126 (320)
Average precipitation days (≥ 0.01 in)	12.6	12.8	14.1	11.6	9.7	5.6	2.0	1.5	2.7	5.9	10.0	13.6	102.1
Source 1: XMACIS2
Source 2: NOAA (Precipitation)

== See also ==
- List of ski areas and resorts in the United States
- Comparison of North American ski resorts
- List of Lake Tahoe ski resorts
