= Homewood Mountain Resort =

Ski area in California, United States

- Location in California Homewood Mountain Resort (the United States)
- Location: Ellis Peak; Tahoe National Forest
- Nearest city: Homewood, California
- Coordinates: 39.0827°N 120.1755°W
- Vertical: 503 m (1,650 ft)
- Top elevation: 2,402 m (7,881 ft)
- Base elevation: 1,899 m (6,230 ft)
- Skiable area: 1,260 acres (510 ha)
- Trails: 60 total: 15% beginner; 50% intermediate; 35% advanced
- Longest run: 2 mi (3.2 km)
- Lift system: 7 lifts
- Terrain parks: Lakeview; Kolby's Escape
- Snowfall: 400 in (1,000 cm)
- Website: www.SkiHomewood.com

Homewood Mountain Resort is a ski area located on the west shore of Lake Tahoe in the state of California, a few miles south of Tahoe City in the town of Homewood. It has 1,260 acres (510 ha) of skiable terrain and eight lifts. While it currently does not offer lodging on site, a Draft Environmental Impact Statement has been submitted to the regional planning commission to allow for the development of a resort inclusive of a hotel, condominiums, and various other additions. Since 2006, JMA Ventures, a San Francisco Bay Area developer, has owned and operated the ski area.

== Management ==
In 2006, Jeff Yurosek sold Homewood to JMA Ventures, a Bay Area development company. Yurosek, who had owned the ski area since 1998, originally wanted to sell the land to the U.S. Forest Service. JMA Ventures says it "is in the planning stages for a redevelopment of the resort including both the north and south base areas." The project is in the environmental review process. JMA Ventures also acquired Alpine Meadows, which physically merged with Squaw Valley as part of a joint venture in 2011.

== Resort ==
Homewood offers trails ranging from beginner to expert. The resort is usually open from December to April and receives about 300 sunny days. The resort is located on the west shore of Lake Tahoe, and most of the mountain faces east, shielding the snow from buffeting winds. The resort is known to have great views of the lake and excellent powder, once winning a top 10 award in the Ski Magazine.

In the summer, Homewood Mountain Resort was open to the public, boasting mountain biking and hiking trails all over the mountain. Although the lifts are not operational in the summer, the North Lodge and a cafe were open.

A residential community development is currently planned to be developed at Homewood. An objection to this development has been raised by the Keep Homewood Public organization. The amended development plan is currently under TRPA review.

Due to the delays in approving the redevelopment plan and a lack of further financial support from their investors, Homewood announced in October 2024 that they would not open for the 2024-25 ski season.

== Climate ==
The climate in the unincorporated village of Homewood is similar to that of Tahoe City only 6.4 mi (10.3 km) north on Highway 89. Homewood Mountain Resort, on average, experiences 400 in (1,000 cm) of snow precipitation and has about 300 days of sunny weather a year. Ellis Peak shields the resort from the high winds created by storms coming over the Sierra Crest creating great snow conditions while other resorts are experiencing "wind holds."

Climate data for Tahoe City
Month	Jan	Feb	Mar	Apr	May	Jun	Jul	Aug	Sep	Oct	Nov	Dec	Year
Mean daily maximum °F (°C)	40.5 (4.7)	42.0 (5.6)	45.1 (7.3)	51.4 (10.8)	60.1 (15.6)	69.2 (20.7)	77.5 (25.3)	77.0 (25.0)	70.1 (21.2)	60.0 (15.6)	47.9 (8.8)	41.4 (5.2)	56.9 (13.8)
Mean daily minimum °F (°C)	20.1 (−6.6)	21.3 (−5.9)	24.3 (−4.3)	27.7 (−2.4)	33.5 (0.8)	39.6 (4.2)	44.7 (7.1)	44.8 (7.1)	39.6 (4.2)	32.3 (0.2)	25.5 (−3.6)	20.6 (−6.3)	31.2 (−0.5)
Source: Melissa data
