= Sierra-at-Tahoe =

Ski area in California, United States

Sierra-At-Tahoe Resort

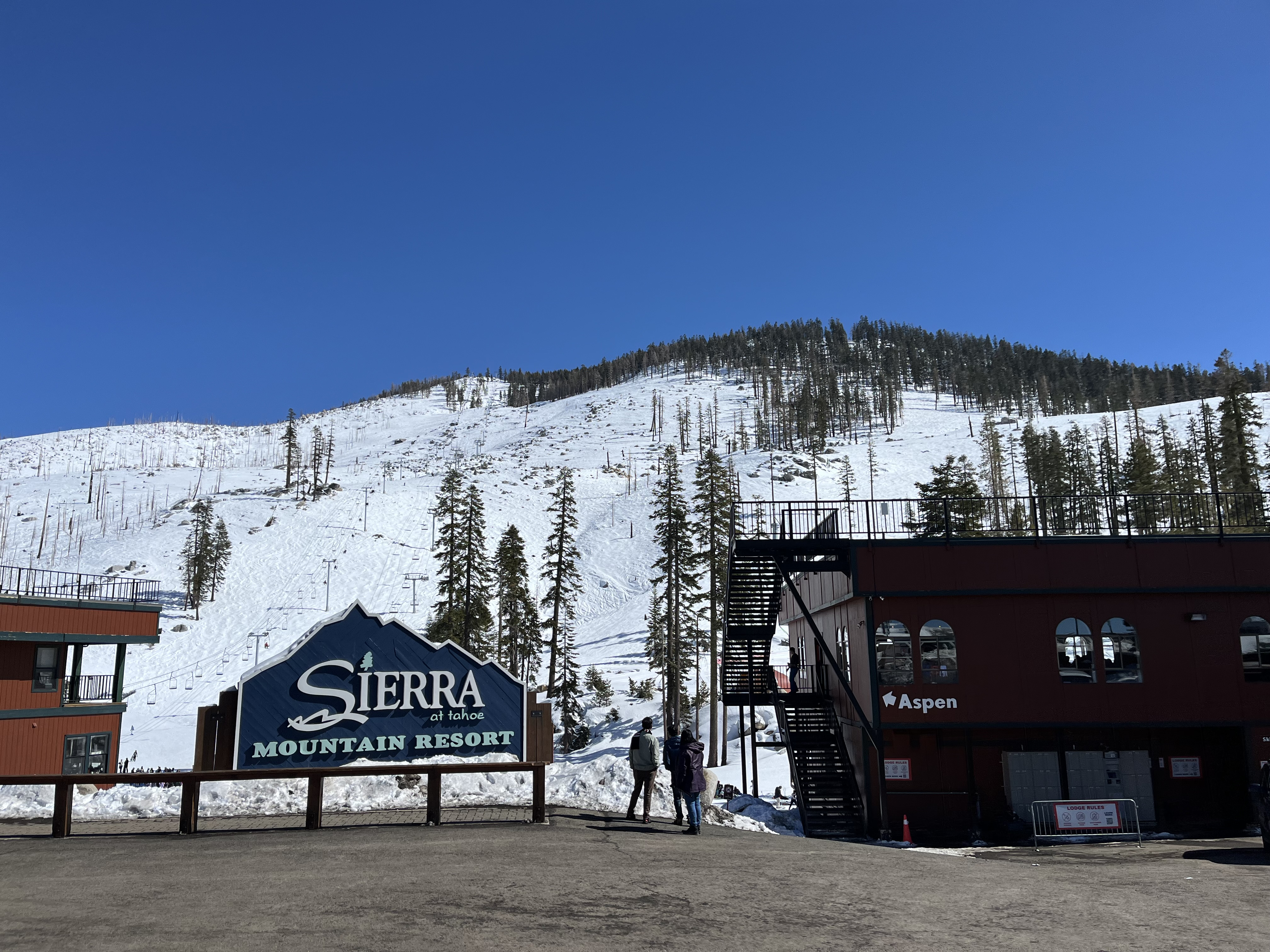
- Sierra-at-Tahoe

- Location in California Sierra-At-Tahoe Resort (the United States)
- Location: Twin Bridges
- Nearest city: Twin Bridges, California
- Coordinates: 38.8002°N 120.0806°W
- Vertical: 2,212 ft (674 m)
- Top elevation: 8,852 ft (2,698 m)
- Base elevation: 6,640 ft (2,020 m)
- Skiable area: 2,000 acres (810 ha)
- Trails: 46 total 25% beginner 50% intermediate 25% advanced
- Longest run: Sugar 'n Spice: 2.5 mi (4.0 km)
- Lift system: 10 lifts (3 high speed quads, 1 triple chair, 5 double chairs, 1 surface lift)
- Terrain parks: 6: The Alley, Smokey Boarder X, Burton Progression, Bashful, Aspen, Upper Snowshoe
- Snowfall: 480 in (1,200 cm)
- Snowmaking: limited acreage
- Night skiing: None
- Website: www.sierraattahoe.com

Sierra-at-Tahoe is a ski and snowboard resort in Twin Bridges, California south of Lake Tahoe. Sierra-at-Tahoe is approximately 16 miles (26 km) south of Stateline, Nevada and 12 miles (19 km) south of South Lake Tahoe on U.S. Route 50 and is contained within the Eldorado National Forest. Sierra-at-Tahoe (often shortened to "Sierra") is a medium-sized ski area in the Lake Tahoe region, and is well known for being a more family oriented resort and also having a high annual snowfall. Sierra-at-Tahoe's terrain is 25 percent beginner, 50 percent Intermediate, and 25 percent advanced.

The majority of the ski resorts in the Lake Tahoe region are on the northern end of the lake, near Truckee, California and Reno, Nevada. Sierra-at-Tahoe, Kirkwood and Heavenly are located south of the lake, approximately 75 miles (120 km) from Reno.

== History ==
Sierra-at-Tahoe Resort was started in 1946 by brothers Ray and Floyd Barrett as Sierra Ski Ranch, further down U.S. Route 50. It was sold to Vern Sprock in 1953. In 1968, the "Ranch" was moved to its present location when the California Department of Transportation began widening U.S. Route 50. The Sprock family operated the resort until 1993 when the resort was sold to Fibreboard Corporation. Fibreboard updated many areas of the resort, including changing the name to Sierra-at-Tahoe Resort. Booth Creek Ski Resorts purchased Sierra-at-Tahoe in 1996. CNL Lifestyle acquired Sierra-at-Tahoe and Northstar California from Booth Creek in 2007. Sierra-at-Tahoe was among 15 resorts sold by CNL to Och-Ziff Capital Management in 2016.
