= Homewood, California =

Unincorporated community in California, United States

Homewood
- Unincorporated community
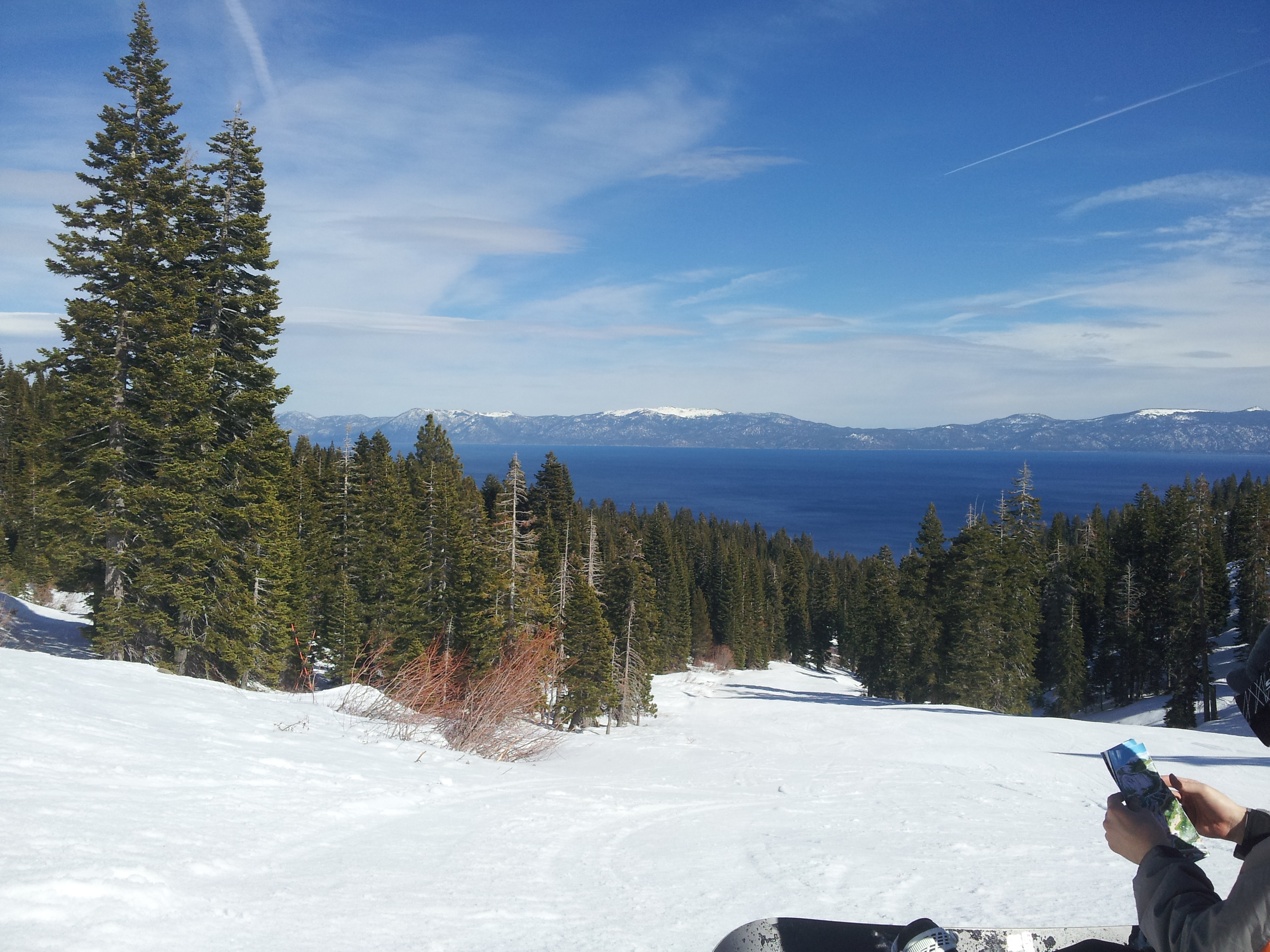
- Lake Tahoe in winter seen from Homewood

- Location within California
- Coordinates: 39°05′13″N 120°09′37″W
- Country: United States
- State: California
- County: Placer
- Elevation: 6,234 ft (1,900 m)
- Time zone: UTC-8 (Pacific (PST))
  - Summer (DST): UTC-7 (PDT)
- ZIP code: 96141
- Area codes: 530, 837
- GNIS feature ID: 261434

Homewood is an unincorporated community of about 200 residents, in Placer County, California, located on the west shore of Lake Tahoe. It is located 5.5 miles (8.9 km) south of Tahoe City and north of Chambers Landing and Tahoma. It is the location of Homewood Mountain Resort.

== History ==
Thomas McConnell is said to be the founder of Homewood, after he purchased lakefront property on Lake Tahoe's west shore and laid out the Homewood District with property on either side of Highway 89 in 1889. The Homewood Post Office was established in 1909.

The community of Tahoe Pines uses Homewood's ZIP Code, 96141.

== Homewood Mountain Resort ==
The Homewood area on the shore of Lake Tahoe is also host to the Homewood Mountain Ski Resort. The resort comprises 1,260 acres (5.1 km^{2}), 7 ski lifts, 60 runs and 1,650 vertical feet with a summit of 7,880 feet (2,400 m).

== Other points of interest ==
- Tahoe Maritime Museum, dedicated to the preservation of the maritime history of Lake Tahoe

“The Tahoe Maritime Museum Board of Directors has announced plans to change the course of the Museum,” wrote Bensley. “Throughout 2020, the nonprofit will be reorganizing into a maritime foundation. The Museum is proud of the numerous exhibitions, educational programs and the thousands of visitors it has welcomed into the Museum over the last 20 years. However, due to our changing community interests and decreasing philanthropic support, the Museum is unable to meet its annual fundraising goals to support a physical museum within the Tahoe Basin.” | tahoemaritimemuseum.org
