= Tahoe Donner Downhill =

Ski area in California, United States

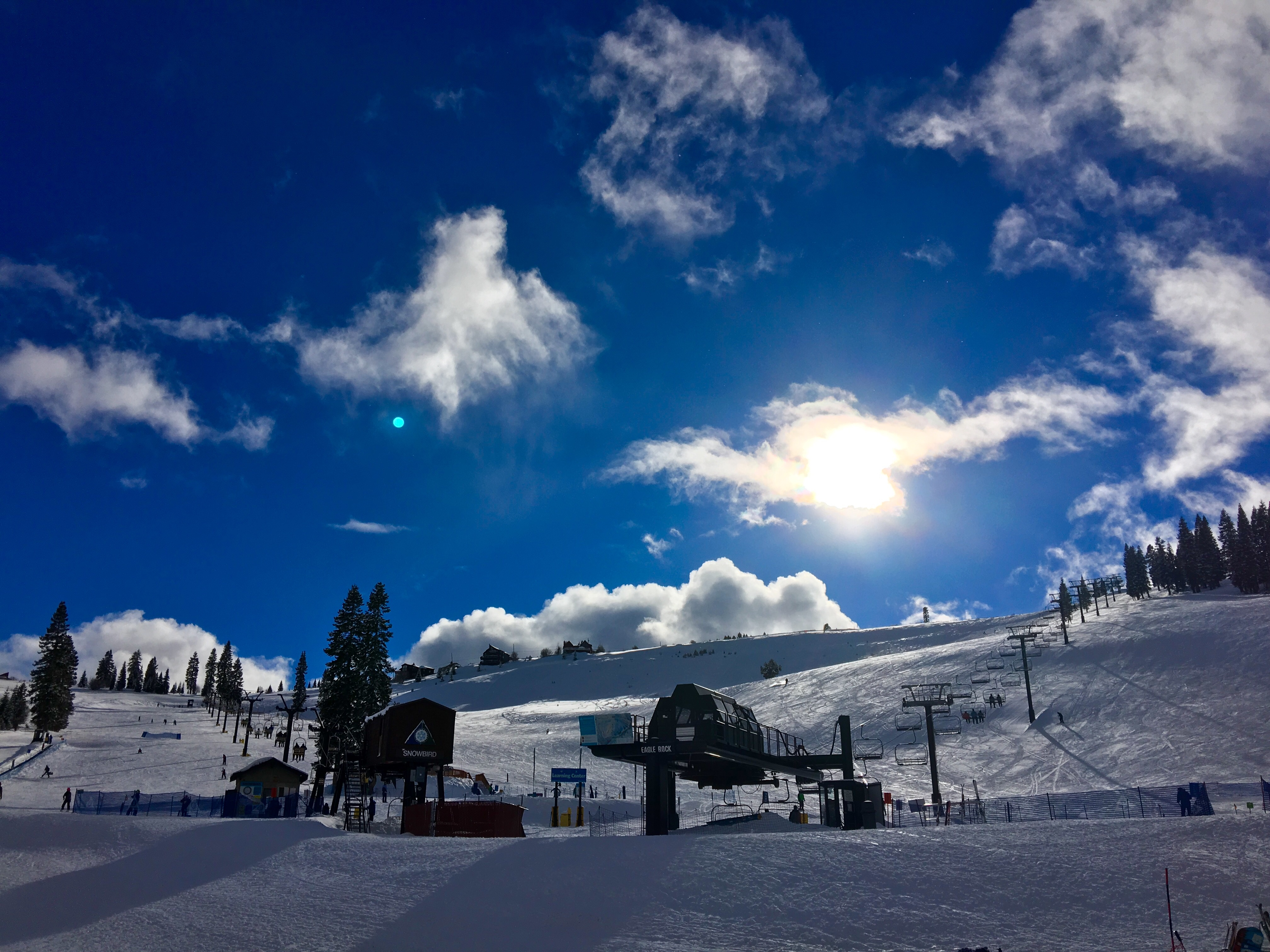
- Interactive map of Tahoe Donner Downhill
- Location: Tahoe Donner
- Nearest city: Truckee, California
- Coordinates: 39.3549°N 120.2590°W
- Vertical: 600 ft (180 m)
- Top elevation: 7,400 ft (2,300 m)
- Base elevation: 6,750 ft (2,060 m)
- Skiable area: 120 acres (49 ha)
- Trails: 14 total 30% beginner 40% intermediate 30% advanced
- Longest run: Mile Run
- Lift system: 5 lifts: (1 quad, 1 triple, 3 conveyors)
- Night skiing: None
- Website: www.SkiTahoeDonner.com

Tahoe Donner Downhill is a small ski resort with five ski lifts and 14+ trails, in Truckee, California 4.5 mi (7.2 km) northeast of Donner Pass. There are two chairlifts, three conveyor lifts, and 14 trails.
