= Norden, California =

Unincorporated community in California, United States

Norden
- Unincorporated community
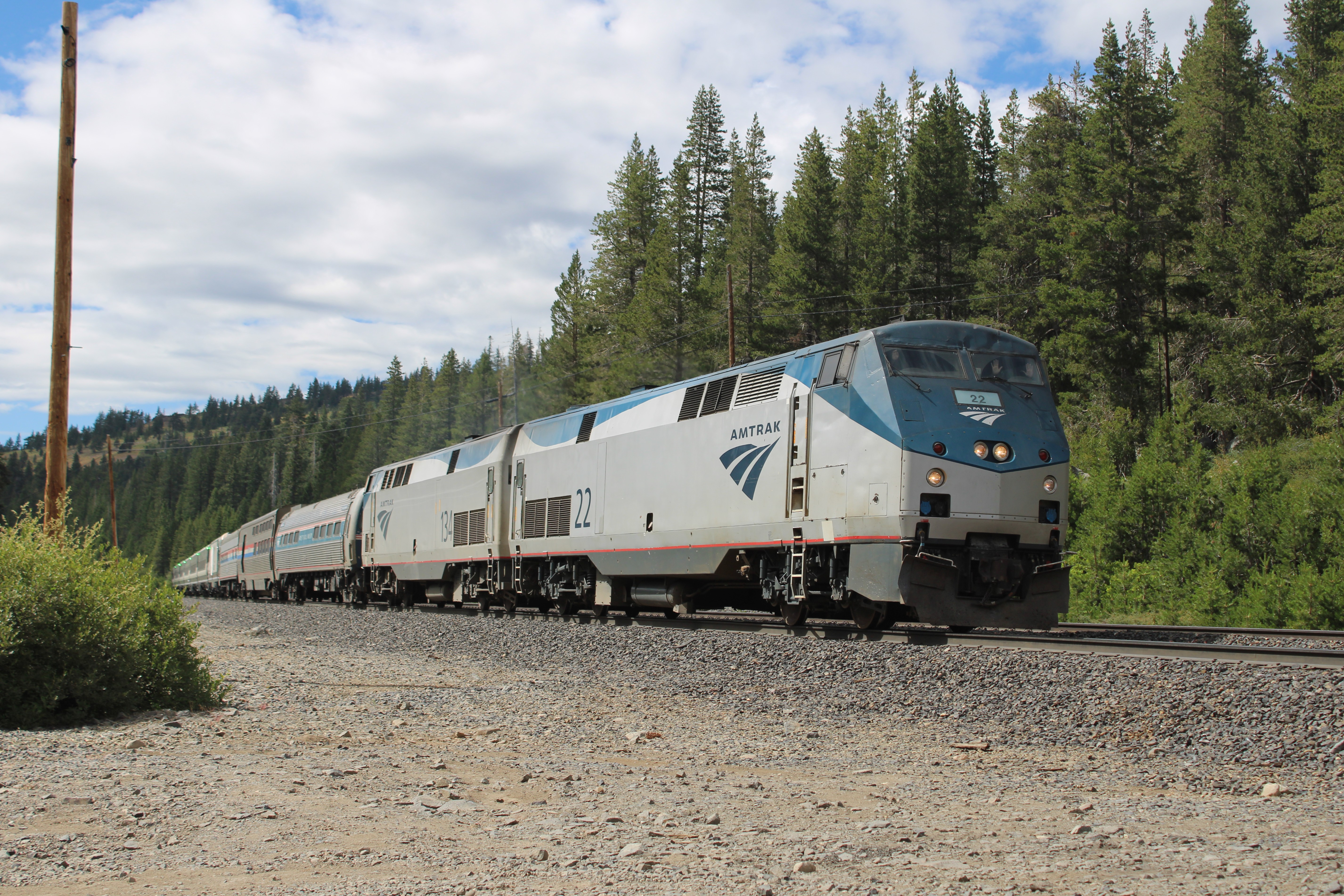
- An Amtrak train passing through Norden in 2025

- Location within the state of California Norden (the United States)
- Coordinates: 39°19′05″N 120°21′22″W
- Country: United States
- State: California
- County: Nevada
- Elevation: 6,939 ft (2,115 m)

Population (2016)
  - Total: 27
- Time zone: UTC-8 (Pacific (PST))
  - Summer (DST): UTC-7 (PDT)
- ZIP code: 95724
- Area code: 530
- GNIS feature ID: 1659242

Norden is a small unincorporated community in Nevada County, California, United States, about 9 miles (14 km) west of Truckee. The community is located on a former portion of U.S. Route 40 near Interstate 80 and lies along the historical first transcontinental railroad, 1.5 miles (2.4 km) west of Donner Pass.

Near Norden is the Sugar Bowl Ski Resort and Donner Ski Ranch, both in Placer County.

The Norden post office, named after the lake, opened in 1926, closed in 1943, and reopened in 1947, and is now closed. The nearby Donner post office operated from 1882 to 1926.

The place is named for Charles Van Norden, an official of the South Yuba Water Company. The dam was built in 1900 and the resulting lake was named after Van Norden.

The community has a population of 27 as of 2016.

== Climate ==
Norden has a Köppen Climate Classification of Warm-Summer Mediterranean Climate abbreviated as Csb.

Climate data for Norden, California
Month	Jan	Feb	Mar	Apr	May	Jun	Jul	Aug	Sep	Oct	Nov	Dec	Year
Mean daily maximum °F (°C)	36 (2)	39 (4)	41 (5)	44 (7)	55 (13)	63 (17)	74 (23)	73 (23)	67 (19)	58 (14)	43 (6)	38 (3)	53 (12)
Mean daily minimum °F (°C)	18 (−8)	18 (−8)	19 (−7)	23 (−5)	31 (−1)	37 (3)	43 (6)	43 (6)	39 (4)	33 (1)	25 (−4)	19 (−7)	29 (−2)
Average precipitation inches (mm)	13.41 (341)	7.81 (198)	7.83 (199)	6.07 (154)	2.17 (55)	1.27 (32)	0.23 (5.8)	1.21 (31)	0.57 (14)	4.43 (113)	8.88 (226)	8.09 (205)	61.98 (1,574)
Source: Weatherbase
