= Soda Springs, Nevada County, California =

Unincorporated community in the United States

Soda Springs
- census-designated place
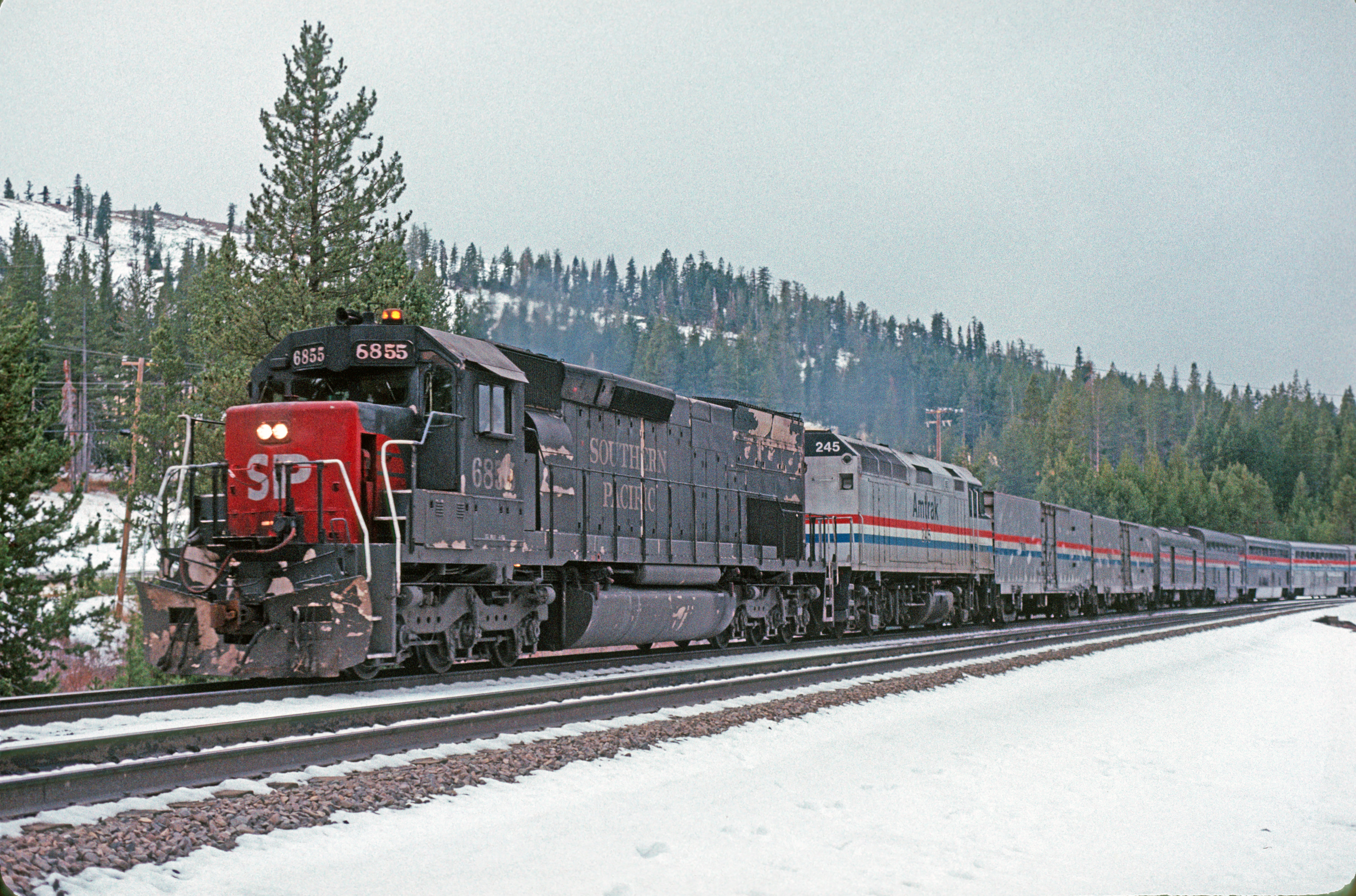
- The Amtrak San Francisco Zephyr at Soda Springs

- Location of Soda Springs in California
- Coordinates: 39°19′24″N 120°22′48″W
- Country: United States
- State: California
- County: Nevada

Area
  - Total: 0.337 sq mi (0.872 km^{2})
  - Land: 0.337 sq mi (0.872 km^{2})
  - Water: 0 sq mi (0 km^{2}) 0%
- Elevation: 6,768 ft (2,063 m)

Population (2020)
  - Total: 94
  - Density: 280/sq mi (110/km^{2})
- Time zone: UTC-8 (Pacific (PST))
  - Summer (DST): UTC-7 (PDT)
- ZIP code: 95728, 95724
- Area code: 530
- GNIS feature IDs: 234848; 2628790

Soda Springs (formerly, Summit Valley, Soda Springs Station, Hopkins, Hopkins Springs, and Tinkers Station) is an unincorporated community and census-designated place (CDP) in Nevada County, California, United States. Soda Springs is located 3 miles (4.8 km) west of Donner Pass. The population was 94 at the 2020 census.

The Soda Springs Mountain Resort is located just off Highway 80 near Donner Summit.

Royal Gorge Cross Country Ski Resort, one of the largest in North America, is located about one mile southwest of Soda Springs.

== History ==
Mark Hopkins and Leland Stanford established a resort at the location in the 1880s.

The Summit Valley post office opened in 1870, changed its name to Soda Springs in 1875, and closed in 1881. It was reopened in 1929. The Hopkins post office operated from 1885 to 1886. Alternately it was reportedly known as Hopkins Springs until the Soda Springs post office was established on March 8, 1875.

The Central Pacific Railroad station was named Tinkers Station from 1867 to 1873, commemorating J.A. Tinker. Tinker was a "rough, hard-driving, hard-drinking teamster" who hauled freight between the mines on Forest Hill Divide and Soda Springs.

== Geography ==
According to the United States Census Bureau, the CDP covers an area of 0.3 square miles (0.9 km^{2}), all of it land.

== Climate ==
Soda Springs has a dry-summer continental climate (Köppen climate classification Dsb) that is characterized by warm, dry summers, and cold, extremely snowy winters. Soda Springs is listed as the snowiest place in the state of California and one of the snowiest census-designated places in the world.

Climate data for Soda Springs, California, 1991–2020 normals
Month	Jan	Feb	Mar	Apr	May	Jun	Jul	Aug	Sep	Oct	Nov	Dec	Year
Average precipitation inches (mm)	13.16 (334)	12.26 (311)	12.14 (308)	6.99 (178)	4.74 (120)	1.57 (40)	0.43 (11)	0.45 (11)	0.99 (25)	3.89 (99)	7.57 (192)	14.35 (364)	78.54 (1,993)
Average snowfall inches (cm)	73.0 (185)	84.2 (214)	105.7 (268)	41.2 (105)	15.6 (40)	1.8 (4.6)	0.0 (0.0)	0.0 (0.0)	1.5 (3.8)	9.9 (25)	42.8 (109)	69.3 (176)	445.0 (1,130)
Average precipitation days (≥ 0.01 in)	12.2	11.6	15.9	11.2	10.8	5.5	1.8	2.8	3.8	5.9	9.3	14.1	104.9
Average snowy days (≥ 0.1 in)	10.0	10.6	13.5	7.7	3.6	0.7	0.0	0.0	0.6	1.8	6.7	11.5	66.7
Source: NOAA

== Demographics ==
Historical population
Census	Pop.	Note	%±
2010	81		—
2020	94		16.0%
U.S. Decennial Census; 2010

Soda Springs first appeared as a census designated place in the 2010 U.S. census.

The 2020 United States census reported that Soda Springs had a population of 94. The population density was 278.9 inhabitants per square mile (107.7/km^{2}). The racial makeup of Soda Springs was 73 (78%) White, 1 (1%) Native American, 2 (2%) Asian, and 18 (19%) from two or more races. Hispanic or Latino of any race were 12 persons (13%).

There were 43 households, and the average household size was 2.19. There were 23 families (53% of all households). The median age was 43.0 years.

There were 131 housing units at an average density of 388.7 units per square mile (150.1 units/km^{2}), of which 43 (33%) were occupied and 84 (64%) were used seasonally. Of the occupied units, 37 (86%) were owner-occupied, and 6 (14%) were occupied by renters.

== Politics ==
In the state legislature, Soda Springs is in the 4th senatorial district, represented by Republican Marie Alvarado-Gil, and the 1st Assembly district, represented by Republican Heather Hadwick.

Federally, Soda Springs is in California's 3rd congressional district, represented by Independent Kevin Kiley.

== Education ==
It is in the Tahoe-Truckee Unified School District.
