= Twin Bridges, California =

Unincorporated community in California, United States

Twin Bridges
- Unincorporated community
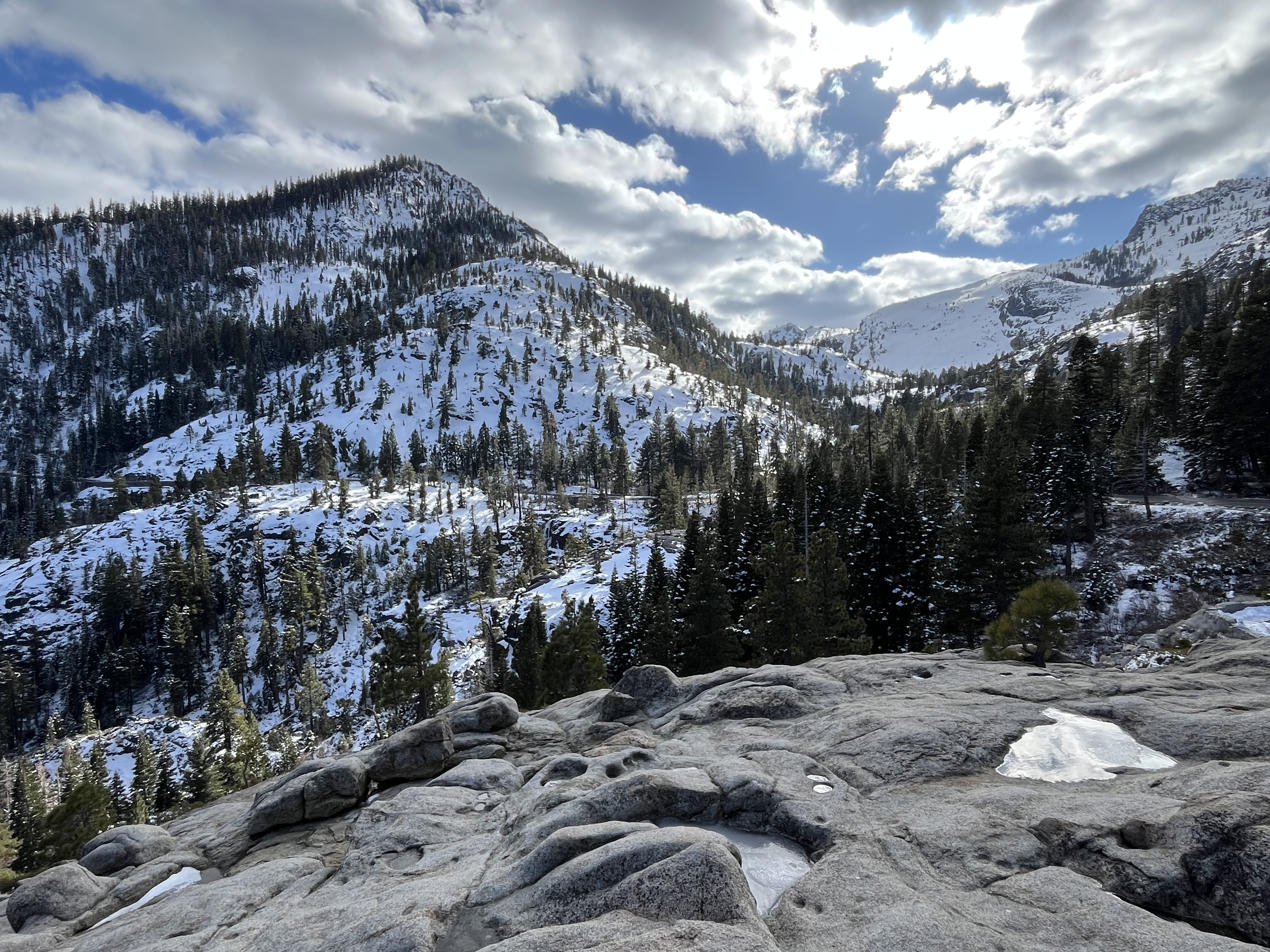

- Location in California Twin Bridges (the United States)
- Coordinates: 38°48′41″N 120°07′27″W
- Country: United States
- State: California
- County: El Dorado
- Elevation: 6,115 ft (1,864 m)

Twin Bridges is a small unincorporated community on U.S. Route 50 near the Desolation Wilderness in El Dorado County, California, United States. It is located 5 miles (8 km) west of Echo Summit, at an elevation of 6,115 feet (1,864 m). Right after the town, the U.S. 50 eastbound starts a steep ascent to Echo Summit, passing Sierra-at-Tahoe ski resort shortly before the summit.

When snow chains are required on the summit, Caltrans often establishes chain control in Twin Bridges. This is likely because of the limited availability of shoulders where chains can be installed on summit approaches.

The ZIP codes are 95721 and 95735. The community is served by area code 530.

The former ski area Edelweiss was just above Twin Bridges on US-50, at what is now called Camp Sacramento. It was the home hill for future Olympian ski racer Spider Sabich. He was raised in Kyburz, twelve miles (19 km) west, in the 1950s and early 1960s.

A post office opened in Twin Bridges in 1947.

== Demographics ==
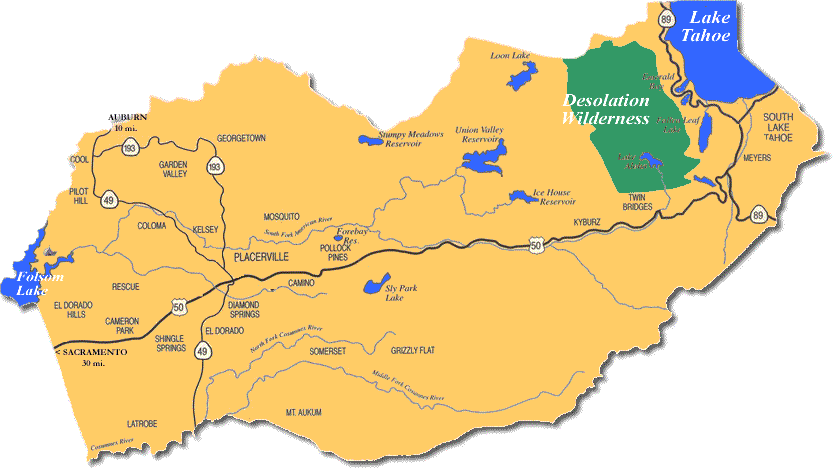
Map showing Twin Bridges

The population is 99% white, 1% Hispanic, 50% male, and 50% female. The average household size is 2, and the average family size is 2.2. There are 125 housing units which are largely unoccupied vacation homes. 100% of the population speaks the English language.

== Climate ==
Twin Bridges has a dry-summer continental climate (Köppen climate classification Dsb) characterized by warm, dry summers, and cold, extremely snowy winters.

Climate data for Twin Bridges, California
Month	Jan	Feb	Mar	Apr	May	Jun	Jul	Aug	Sep	Oct	Nov	Dec	Year
Mean daily maximum °F (°C)	40.2 (4.6)	39.1 (3.9)	43.3 (6.3)	46.5 (8.1)	54.2 (12.3)	68.1 (20.1)	77.8 (25.4)	76.4 (24.7)	69.3 (20.7)	58.9 (14.9)	45.5 (7.5)	39.9 (4.4)	54.9 (12.7)
Mean daily minimum °F (°C)	20.6 (−6.3)	20.7 (−6.3)	22.1 (−5.5)	26.9 (−2.8)	33.3 (0.7)	41.8 (5.4)	48.2 (9.0)	47.0 (8.3)	42.9 (6.1)	35.0 (1.7)	25.0 (−3.9)	20.3 (−6.5)	35.6 (2.0)
Average precipitation inches (mm)	10.77 (274)	10.03 (255)	9.52 (242)	5.19 (132)	4.02 (102)	1.25 (32)	0.11 (2.8)	0.26 (6.6)	0.55 (14)	3.46 (88)	5.27 (134)	11.63 (295)	62.06 (1,577.4)
Average snowfall inches (cm)	74.7 (190)	78.2 (199)	83.5 (212)	34.2 (87)	11.0 (28)	2.7 (6.9)	0.0 (0.0)	0.0 (0.0)	3.5 (8.9)	12.7 (32)	42.7 (108)	63.6 (162)	406.8 (1,033.8)
Source: Weather-US

== See also ==
- Lover's Leap (Tahoe, CA)
