= Donner Ski Ranch =

Ski area in California, United States

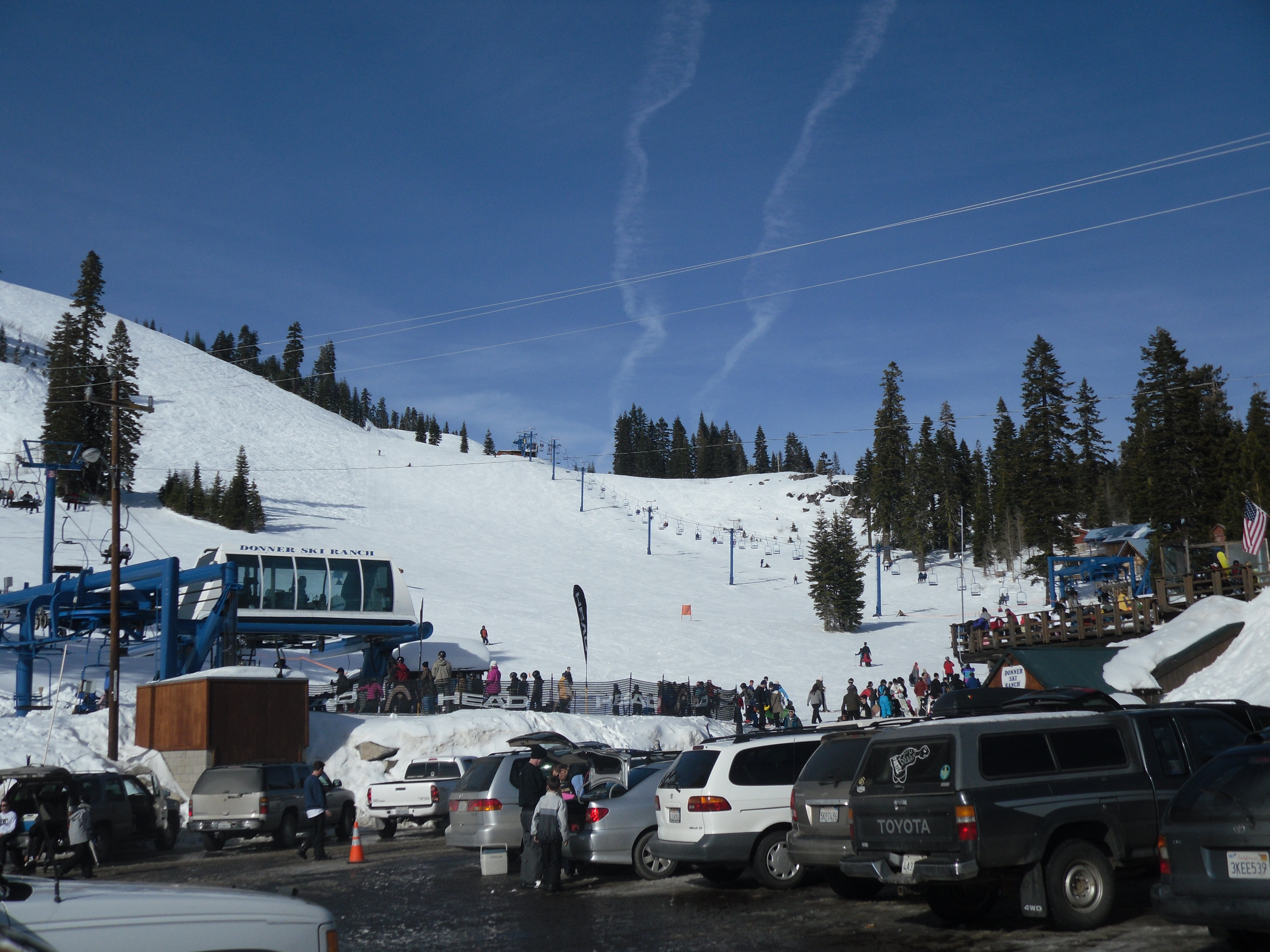

- Location in California Donner Ski Ranch (the United States)
- Location: Donner Summit; Tahoe National Forest
- Nearest city: Norden, California
- Coordinates: 39°19′5.93″N 120°19′48.07″W
- Vertical: 750 ft (230 m)
- Top elevation: 7,781 ft (2,372 m)
- Base elevation: 7,031 ft (2,143 m)
- Skiable area: 435 acres (176 ha)
- Trails: 52 total 25% beginner 50% intermediate 25% advanced
- Lift system: 8: 5 doubles, 1 triple, 2 moving carpets
- Snowfall: 412 in (1,050 cm)
- Snowmaking: Yes
- Night skiing: None
- Website: www.donnerskiranch.com

Donner Ski Ranch is a budget-oriented, family owned ski area located on Donner Summit in the Tahoe National Forest of Nevada County, California. It is owned by Janet and Marshall Tuttle, who purchased it after it went into bankruptcy. The area it is on has been used for skiing since 1937. It has ski lifts on both sides of its summit, and is located close to Sugar Bowl Ski Resort. 25% of its terrain is beginner, 50% intermediate, and 25% advanced, but of the 52 runs 16 are of beginning difficulty, 20 are intermediate, and 16 are advanced.

The rustic lodge, built-in 1947, is mostly made of wood, and has open pipes. The adjacent structure was built in 1951 by John Sloan Woodard, who owned and operated the resort from 1950-1956. Norm Sayler worked for Woodard at the Donner Ski Ranch starting in 1953, helping to build the ski area’s first chairlift in 1955. Sayler took over the management of the resort in 1958, and ran it for the next 46 years, while slowly acquiring most of the ownership. The rustic lodge was renovated after its acquisition by its current owners. At the time of the acquisition, all of the ski lifts were painted as well.
