= Comparison of Southeastern United States ski resorts =

The Southeastern United States offers many ski resorts. The following table compares their various sizes, runs, lifts, and snowfall:

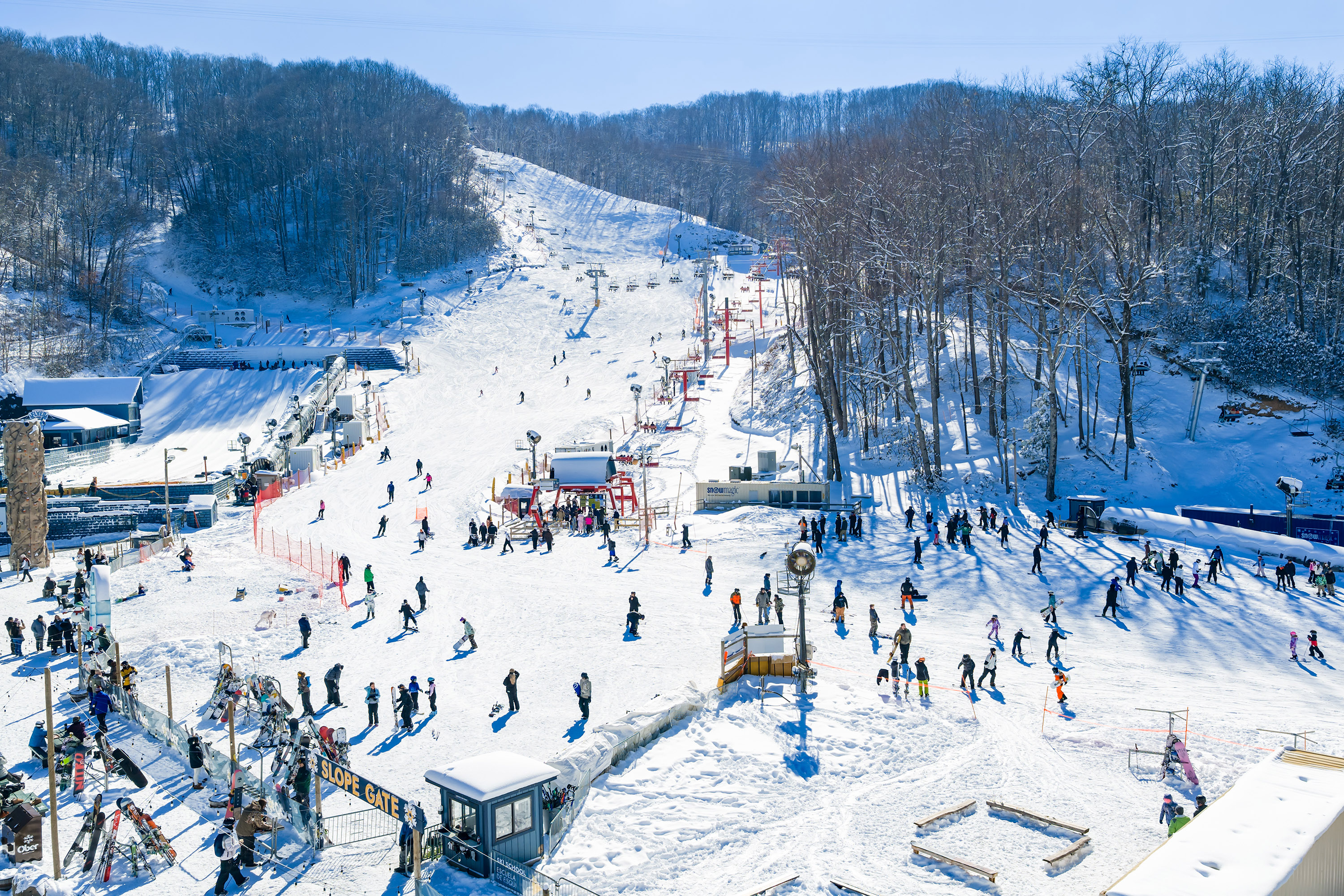
The base area of Ober Mountain

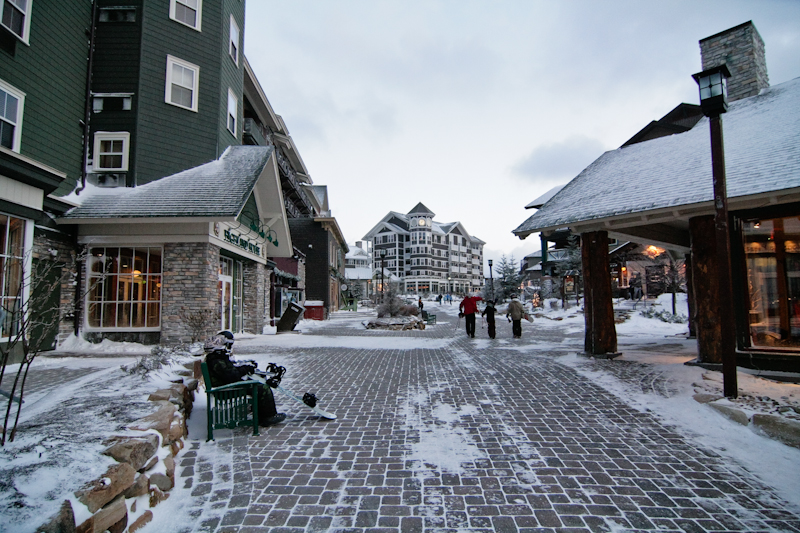
The village at Snowshoe Mountain

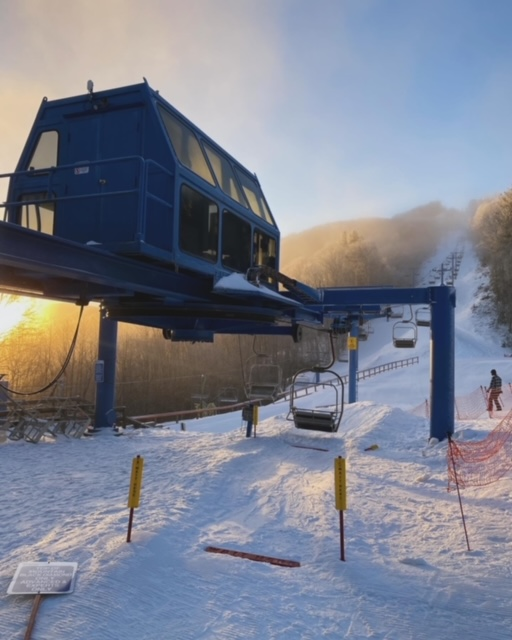
Chairlift at Cataloochee Ski Area

Comparison table of Southeastern United States ski resorts
Resort name	Nearest city	State/province	Peak elevation (ft)	Base elevation (ft)	Vertical drop (ft)	Skiable acreage	Total trails	Total lifts	Average annual snowfall (in)	Date statistics updated
Appalachian Ski Mountain	Blowing Rock	North Carolina	4,000	3,635	365	27	12	5	27	December 11, 2019
Beech Mountain Resort	Beech Mountain	North Carolina	5,506	4,675	831	95	17	8	84	December 11, 2019
Bryce Resort	Basye	Virginia	1,750	1,250	500	25	8	7	30	September 29, 2019
Canaan Valley Resort	Dryfork	West Virginia	4,280	3,430	850	91	39	4	150	September 29, 2019
Cataloochee Ski Area	Maggie Valley	North Carolina	5,400	4,660	740	50	18	5	24	December 11, 2019
Cloudmont Resort	Mentone	Alabama	1,800	1,650	150	9	2	2	0	September 29, 2019
Massanutten Resort	Harrisonburg	Virginia	2,925	1,750	1,110	70	13	7	35	September 29, 2019
Hatley Pointe	Mars Hill	North Carolina	4,700	4,000	700	65	15	4	65	December 11, 2019
Homestead Resort	Hot Springs	Virginia	3,200	2,500	700	45	10	2	50	September 29, 2019
Ober Gatlinburg	Gatlinburg	Tennessee	3,300	2,700	600	38	10	4	9	September 28, 2019
Oglebay Resort	Wheeling	West Virginia			168		1	1		September 29, 2019
Snowshoe Mountain	Marlinton	West Virginia	4,848	3,348	1,500	244	60	14	180	December 11, 2019
Sapphire Valley Ski Area	Sapphire	North Carolina	3,400	3,200	200	8	3	3	24	December 28, 2023
Sugar Mountain Resort	Banner Elk	North Carolina	5,300	4,100	1,200	120	21	8	77	December 11, 2019
Wintergreen Resort	Charlottesville	Virginia	3,515	2,512	1,003	129	26	5	35	December 11, 2019
Winterplace	Ghent	West Virginia	3,600	2,997	603	90	28	9	100	September 29, 2019

== See also ==
- Comparison of California ski resorts
- Comparison of Colorado ski resorts
- Comparison of Lake Tahoe area ski resorts
- Comparison of New Mexico ski resorts
- List of ski areas and resorts in the United States
