= Cataloochee =

Cataloochee is the name of several places associated with the Great Smoky Mountains of Western North Carolina.

- Cataloochee Ski Area — a ski resort near Maggie Valley
- Cataloochee (Great Smoky Mountains) — a recreational and historic area of the Great Smoky Mountains National Park
