= Ober Gatlinburg =

Ski area and amusement park in Tennessee

Ober Gatlinburg Adventure Park & Ski Area

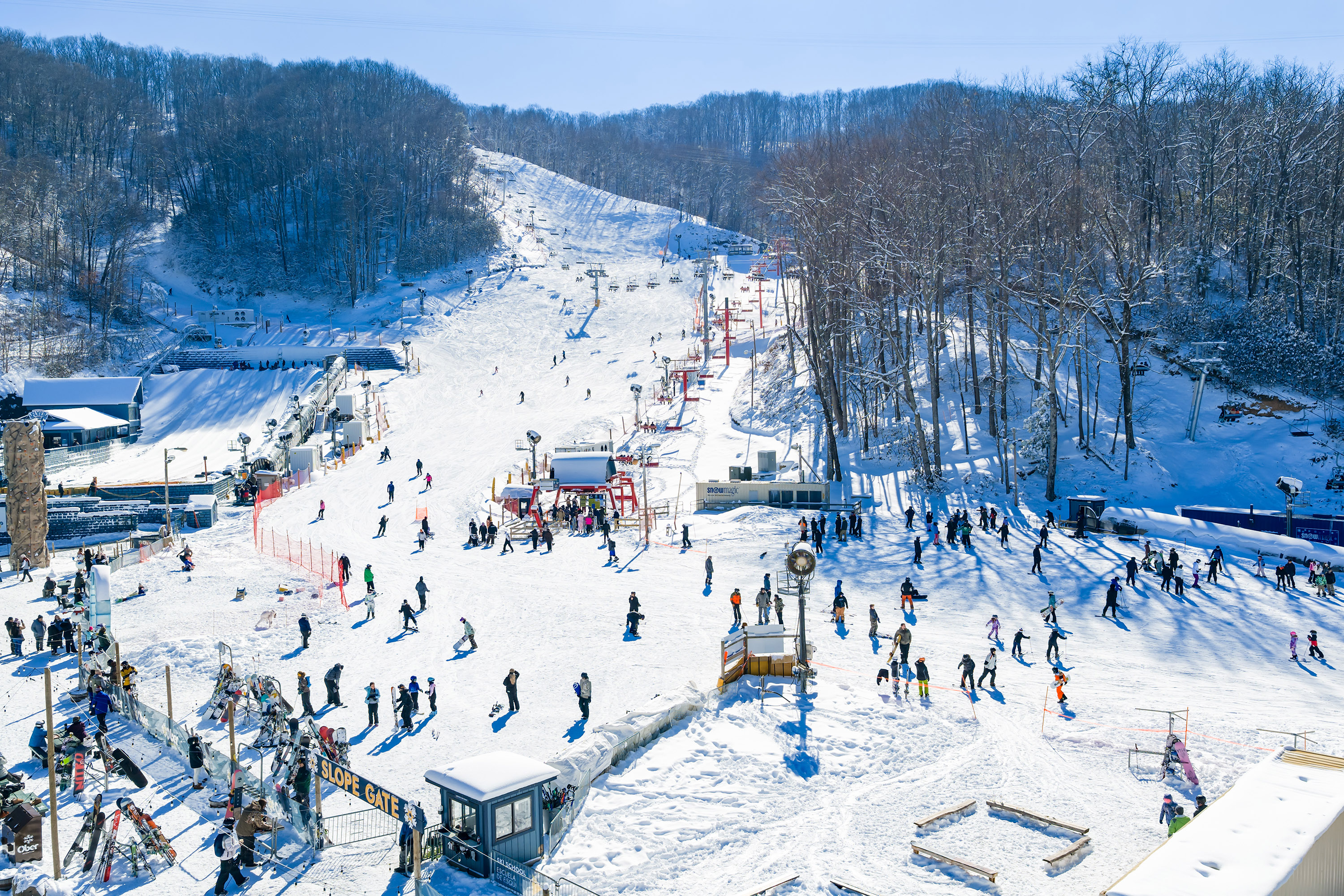
- The base area of Ober Gatlinburg in Feb. 2026
- Interactive map of Ober Gatlinburg Adventure Park & Ski Area
- Location: Gatlinburg, Tennessee, US
- Coordinates: 35°42′11″N 83°33′28″W
- Vertical: 526 feet (160 m)
- Top elevation: 3,208 feet (978 m)
- Base elevation: 2,682 feet (817 m)
- Trails: 11 total: 27% beginner; 55% intermediate; 18% advanced
- Lift system: 5 total (3 quad chairlifts, 2 surface lifts)
- Terrain parks: Lower Bear
- Snowmaking: Yes
- Night skiing: Yes
- Website: obermountain.com

Ober Gatlinburg Adventure Park & Ski Area is a ski area and year-round amusement park located in Gatlinburg, Tennessee, within the Great Smoky Mountains. Originally the Gatlinburg Ski Resort, the park was established in 1962. Ober Gatlinburg is the only ski area in the state of Tennessee and features 10 ski trails. The adventure park features a variety of shops, dining options, and seasonal attractions including an indoor ice skating rink, zipline, and scenic chairlift. Upon being acquired by new ownership, the park was renamed to Ober Mountain in 2022 before reverting to its prior name in 2026.

The Gatlinburg Tram, the largest aerial tramway in North America, connects downtown Gatlinburg to Ober Gatlinburg with a 2.1-mile travel over the mountains. Ober Gatlinburg is also accessible via a 2.9-mile drive on Ski Mountain Road.

== History ==
=== 1960s - Inception ===
Gatlinburg Ski Resort opened in December 1962, as a private club and one of the only ski resorts in the Southeast. It included a lodge, four ski runs, and an outdoor ice rink.

=== 1970s ===
After gathering inspiration from a trip to Europe in the early 1970s, in 1972, real estate developer Claude Anders began construction on the Gatlinburg Aerial Tramway to connect downtown Gatlinburg to the Gatlinburg Ski Resort. It opened on August 5, 1973. In 1974 the Gatlinburg Ski Resort faced operational and financial hardship from a lift incident, which created heavily negative publicity and strain on the business. In 1975, the Gatlinburg Ski Resort was bought by the Anders Family and merged operations with the Gatlinburg Aerial Tramway. In 1976, the Old Heidelberg Castle restaurant opened in the Ober Gatlinburg lodge, serving authentic German fare and live entertainment. The Alpine Slide opened in 1976 as well, served by the Scenic Chairlift. In 1977 it was renamed Ober Gatlinburg, meaning "Upper Gatlinburg" or "Top of Gatlinburg" in German.

Upon purchasing Gatlinburg Ski Resort, there were four ski trails. The Anders Family grew the trail count to 10 trails.

=== 1980s ===
The Red Lift, a fixed grip quad chairlift, was opened in 1981 to serve the new beginner slope, Cub Way. The Black Lift, A Borvig fixed grip quad chairlift, was installed to serve the top of the mountain. Trails serviced by this new lift included Ober Chute and Upper Bear Run. In 1988, new slopes including the Lower Bear Run and Mogul Ridge opened, giving Ober the steepest advanced terrain in the Southeastern United States.

The Ober Gatlinburg Municipal Black Bear Habitat also opened in 1981. The upper mall, which currently houses the Ice Rink, retail shops, and eateries were constructed in 1981 and opened to the public in 1982.

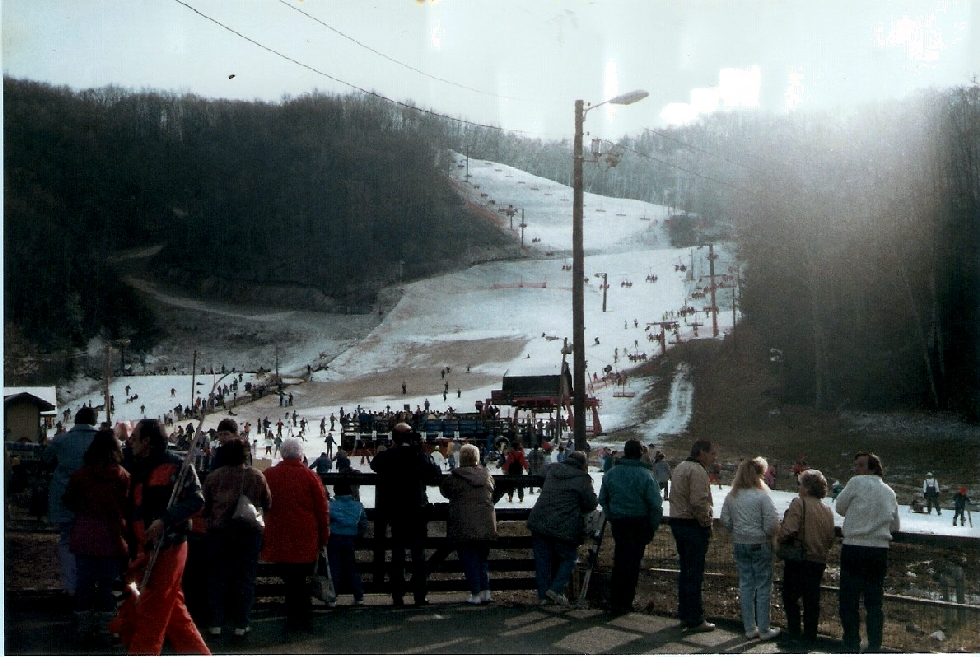
Ober Gatlinburg in 1988

=== 1990s ===
Officially opened in 1993, The Ober Gatlinburg Bungee Jump began offering guests the opportunity to jump from over 60 feet above the ground. In June of 1995, the Blue Cyclone Rapids water raft ride opened on the other side of the Bungee Jump staircase. In 1998, snowmaking efforts were upgraded for ski season with energy-efficient fan guns and pole guns. Snowboarding entered the winter scene and became increasingly popular at Ober in the 1990s.

=== 2000s ===
The Wildlife Habitat was expanded in 2007 to become the Smoky Mountain Wildlife Encounter, featuring more native species and new exhibits including the Nocturnal House, Birds of Prey, and River Otters.

In January 2009, the Snow Tubing Park was opened.

=== 2010s ===
In 2012, the resort installed a snowmaking system, which allows them to open earlier in the season, before natural snow occurs.

In 2014, the Wildlife Habitat expanded to include bobcat and fox exhibits.

In 2015, the Ski Mountain Coaster (later renamed the Tennessee Flyer Mountain Coaster) was built by ADG Mountainslides and opened as a year-round family attraction. Yeti's Run ski trail also opened, adding more skiable terrain.

In 2017, the snowmaking system was upgraded, with a focus on Cub Way.

In 2018, ice bumper cars were opened as an indoor, year-round attraction, and in 2019, Summer Tubing and the rock-climbing wall opened.

=== 2020s ===
In 2022, Ober Gatlinburg was purchased by a group of Sevier County natives and was rebranded as Ober Mountain Adventure Park and Ski Area.

In June 2023 the downhill mountain biking park was opened with 11 trails and full-service rentals. New mountaintop green space, a jumbotron TV, and children's attractions were added that summer as well.

In 2024, the 5,000 square foot Sky Village scenic deck opened at the top of Mount Harrison, making it the highest scenic viewing area in Gatlinburg outside of the Great Smoky Mountains National Park. On August 17, The Cloud Catcher Zipline opened at the top of Mount Harrison, with the highest elevation launch of any regional zipline.

In January 2025, The Ober Challenge Lift, a fixed-grip Doppelmayr quad chairlift, opened to replace the Black Lift. The Ober Challenge Lift serves the ski slopes to the top of the mountain in the winter and the mountain bike park in the summer. The Sky Village Lift, a scenic chairlift, opened the following month. It is a Doppelmayr fixed grip quad chairlift and takes guests to the summit of Mount Harrison, making it the highest lift-served peak in the Smoky Mountains.

In 2026, during the annual maintenance closure in April, it was announced that Ober Mountain would be reverting back to its original name of Ober Gatlinburg.

== Ski slopes ==
Ober Gatlinburg features 11 ski trails of varying difficulty from easy (green) to advanced (black diamond). The trail breakdown is as follows:

- Easy – 3 trails (27%)
- Intermediate – 6 trails (55%)
- Advanced – 2 trails (18%)

Alpine Way was previously accessible the Blue Lift, a fixed grip double, that originated next to the Sky Village Lift and ended at the top of Alpine Way for skiers in the winter and the top of the Smoky Mountain Bobsled for guests in the summer. The Blue Lift was removed in 2024 to make room for the new Sky Village Lift, which has a mid-way drop-off point in the same region as the old Blue Lift. The mountain's new ownership is considering options to provide access to Alpine way to skiers again in the future.

== Lifts ==
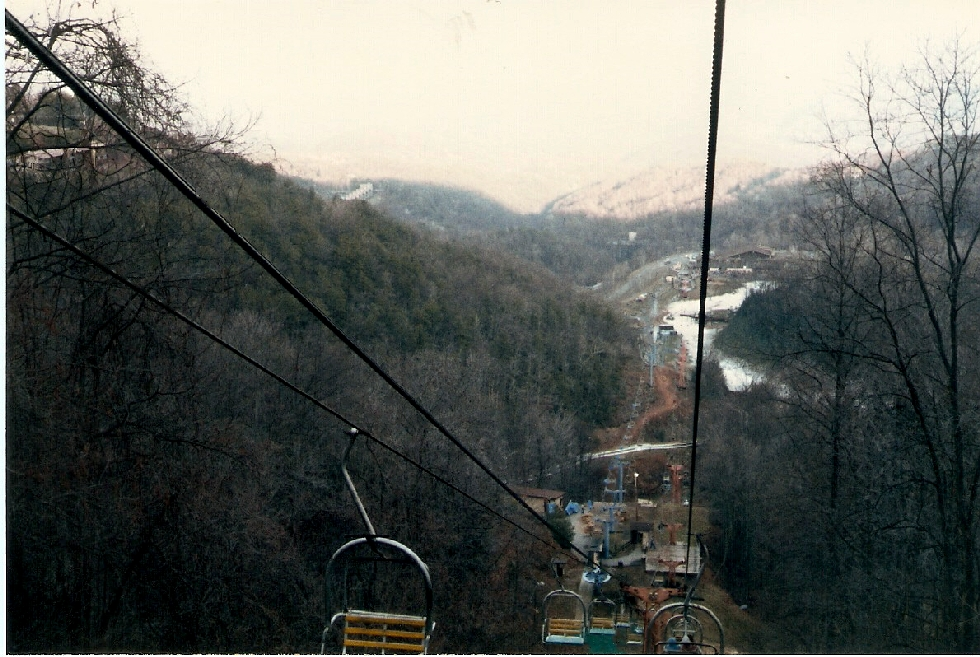
Scenic Lift

There are five lifts with a mix of ski-focused chair lifts and passenger-focused chair lifts. There are three lifts that primarily service skiers in the winter, one of which is converted for mountain biking in the summer. There is one chair lift primarily focused on scenic foot traffic that ascends to the top of Mount Harrison, where there is a scenic overlook. The final lift is a magic carpet that provides access to the top of the tubing hill.

Current chair lifts
Lift name	Type	Length	Vertical	Manufacturer	Year installed
Sky Village Lift	Fixed grip quad	3020' (920m)	780' (238m)	Doppelmayr	2025
Challenge Lift	Fixed grip quad	2116' (645m)	552' (168m)	Doppelmayr	2025
Easy Lift (Red Lift)	Fixed grip quad	787' (240m)	166' (51m)	Borvig (Partek)	1981
Magic Carpet	Surface lift	330' (101m)	50' (15m)	Sunkid	
Mighty Carpet	Surface lift	124' (38m)	15' (4.6m)	Sunkid	

Previously operating chair lifts
Lift name	Length	Vertical	Year removed	Replaced by
Black Lift	2116' (645m)	552' (168m)	2024	Challenge Lift
Scenic Lift	3020' (920m)	780' (238m)	2025	Sky Village Lift
Blue Lift	1522' (464m)	280' (85m)	2024	Sky Village Lift

== Aerial tramway ==
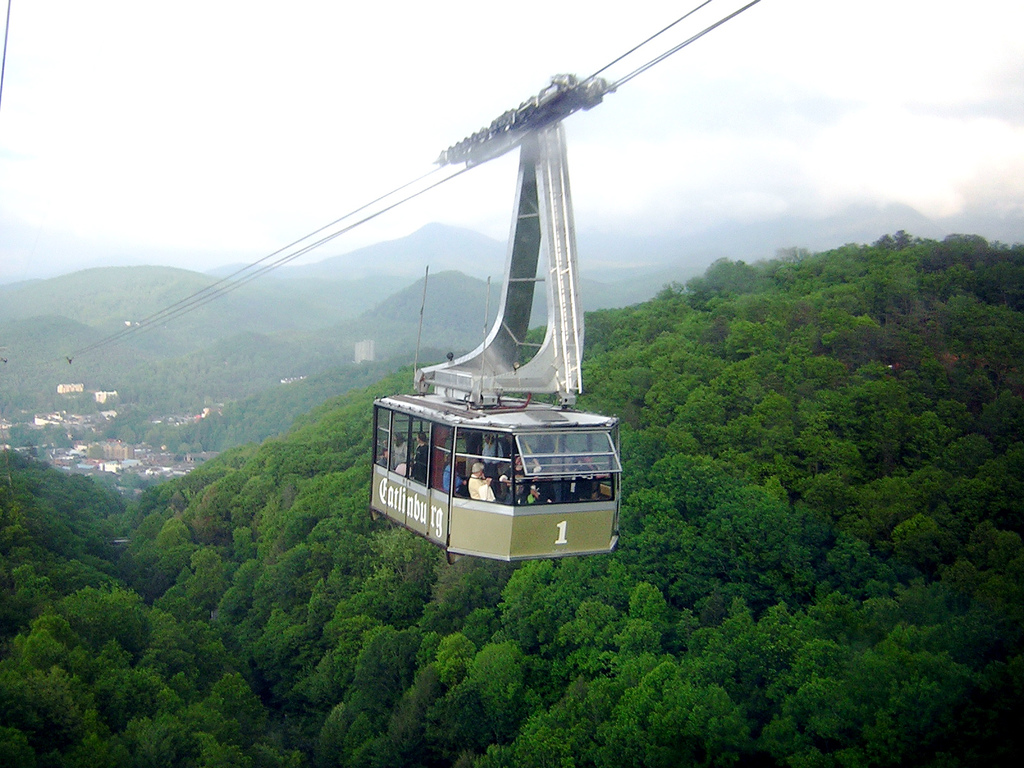
Ober Gatlinburg Tram

The aerial tramway departs from downtown Gatlinburg and travels west to the resort. The system was built in 1973 by Von Roll Ltd. and has two 120-passenger cabins. They were replaced by Doppelmayr in 2007. The 2.1-mile (3.4 km) tram ride runs 17 miles per hour (27 km/h) and takes about 10 minutes. In 2021 the haul rope was replaced and the motors were replaced with new A/C drive motors.

== Amusement park ==
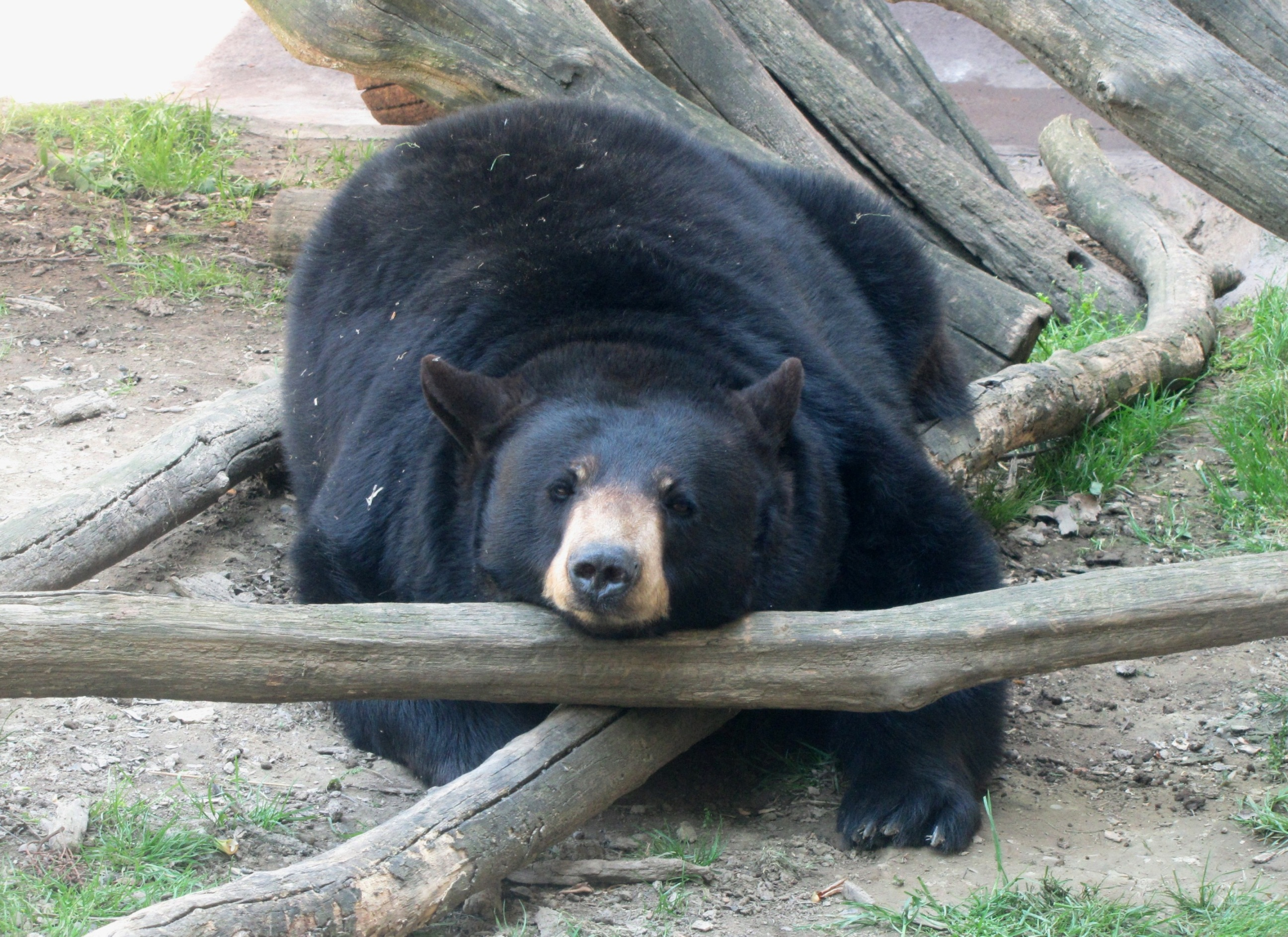
A black bear resting in the wildlife habitat at Ober Gatlinburg

The amusement park portion of Ober Gatlinburg is open year-round. Animals native to the Great Smoky Mountains, including black bears, river otters, a bald eagle, a golden eagle, and two bobcats, are available for viewing. Other attractions include: The Smoky Mountain Bobsled (alpine slide), the Tennessee Flyer Mountain Coaster, indoor ice skating, ice bumper cars, chair swings, a rock climbing wall, and a carousel.

A multi-lane snow tubing hill has up to 10 lanes that are approximately 400 feet (122 m) long with a 50 feet (15 m) vertical drop. The tubing hill is serviced by a magic carpet, as is the ski school slope. In the summer, the snow tubing hill is fitted with summer tubing tracks, which simulate the experience of tubing on snow.

In June 2023, downhill mountain biking was added to Ober Gatlinburg. Eleven trails were carved into parts of the mountain for the first season, and the trail network expanded to 14 trails in the summer of 2025.

Difficulty breakdown:

- Easy – 3 trails (21%)
- Intermediate – 4 trails (29%)
- Difficult – 6 trails (43%)
- Expert – 1 (7%)

== See also ==
Nearby ski areas:

- Cataloochee Ski Area
- Appalachian Ski Mountain
- Beech Mountain Resort
- Hatley Pointe
- Sugar Mountain Resort
