= Popcorn Sutton =

American moonshiner and bootlegger (1946–2009)

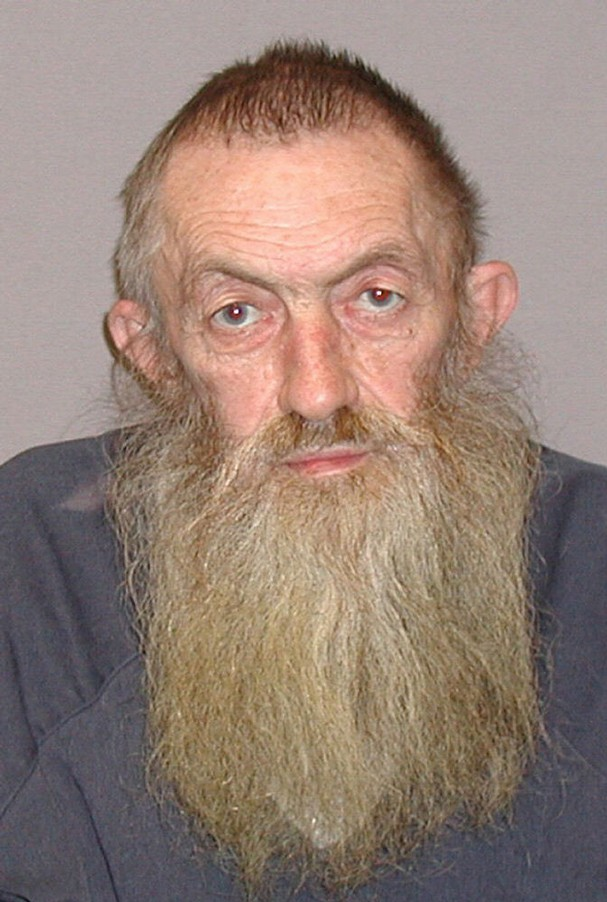
- Popcorn Sutton's U.S. Marshals Service mugshot, c. 2008
- Born: Marvin Sutton; October 5, 1946; Maggie Valley, North Carolina, U.S.
- Died: March 16, 2009 (aged 62); Parrottsville, Tennessee, U.S.
- Occupations: Moonshiner, bootlegger
- Notable work: Popcorn Sutton's Tennessee White Whiskey
- Spouse: Pamela Sutton
- Children: 1

Marvin "Popcorn" Sutton (October 5, 1946 – March 16, 2009) was an American Appalachian moonshiner and bootlegger. Born in Maggie Valley, North Carolina, he grew up, lived and died in the rural areas around Maggie Valley and nearby Cocke County, Tennessee. He wrote a self-published autobiographical guide to moonshining production, self-produced a home video depicting his moonshining activities, was the subject of several documentaries, including one that received a Regional Emmy Award, and is the subject of the award-winning biography and photobook The Moonshiner Popcorn Sutton.

Sutton committed suicide in March 2009, aged 62, rather than report to federal prison after being convicted of offenses related to moonshining and illegal firearm possession. Since his death, a new company and associated whiskey brand have been named after him.

== Moonshining career and rise to fame ==
Sutton had a long career making moonshine and bootlegging. Sutton said he considered moonshine production a legitimate part of his heritage, as he was a Scots-Irish American and descended from a long line of moonshiners. In the 1960s or 1970s, Sutton was given the nickname of "Popcorn" after his frustrated attack on a bar's faulty popcorn vending machine with a pool cue.

Before his rise to fame at around 60 years of age, he had been in trouble with the law several times, but had avoided prison sentences. In 1974, he was convicted of selling untaxed liquor, and in 1981 and 1985 on charges of possessing controlled substances and assault with a deadly weapon. He received only probation sentences until the 1985 arrest, after which he served time in the Craggy Correctional Center in Asheville. In 1998, his roadside store in Maggie Valley, NC was searched by state agents, who seized a moonshine still and sixty gallons of moonshine. Sutton was again placed on probation with a suspended sentence.

Sutton then wrote a self-published autobiography and guide to moonshine production called Me and My Likker, and began selling copies of it in 1999 out of his junk shop in Maggie Valley. The New York Times later called it "a rambling, obscene, and often hilarious account of his life in the trade". A woman named Ernestine Upchurch, with whom Sutton had been living in the 1990s, later said she helped write the book. At around the same time, Sutton produced a home video of the same title and released it on VHS tape.

He was a short, skinny fella, who always wore his hat – that was kind of his claim to fame, his hat that he always wore. And his bib overalls – he always wore bib overalls. Even when he came to federal court, he was wearing bib overalls. He was a friendly fellow, and of course every time you would talk to him, he would say, "Ray, I've run my last run of moonshine, I'm not gonna do it anymore, I'm just getting too old to be doing this stuff."

— Radio reporter Ray Snader on "Popcorn" Sutton, 2009.

His first appearance in a feature film, that was not self-published, was in Neal Hutcheson's 2002 documentary, Mountain Talk, as one of the southern Appalachian people featured in this film focused on the "mountain dialect" of the area. Sutton next appeared in another Hutcheson film that became the cornerstone of his notoriety, called This is the Last Dam Run of Likker I'll Ever Make. Filmed and released in 2002, the film quickly became a cult classic and over time drew the attention of television producers in Boston and New York.

In 2007, a fire on Sutton's property in Parrottsville led to firefighters discovering 650 gallons of untaxed alcohol there. He was convicted and put on probation again by Cocke County authorities.

Sutton was featured in the 2007 documentary Hillbilly: The Real Story on The History Channel. The source footage from the 2002 documentary was also re-worked into another Hutcheson documentary, The Last One, which was released in 2008 and was broadcast on PBS. It received a 2009 Southeast Emmy Award.

In March 2008, Sutton told an undercover federal officer that he had 500 gallons of moonshine in Tennessee and another 400 gallons in Maggie Valley that he was ready to sell. This led to a raid of his property by the ATF, led by Jim Cavanaugh of Waco siege infamy. In January 2009, Sutton, who had pleaded guilty, was sentenced to 18 months in a federal prison for illegally distilling spirits and possession of a firearm (a .38-caliber handgun) as a felon.

Sutton, 62 and suffering from a long illness that his doctors had failed to diagnose, asked the U.S. District Judge Ronnie Greer to allow him to serve his sentence under house arrest, and several petitions were made by others requesting that his sentence be reduced or commuted, but this time to no avail. The judge noted that Sutton was still under probation in Tennessee at the time of the federal raid, and said that putting a man on probation again after being convicted five times of various crimes would not serve the community interest. He said he had considered a harsher sentence of 24 months, but had decided on 18 months after considering Sutton's age and medical condition.

== Death and memorial services ==
Sutton killed himself by carbon monoxide poisoning on March 16, 2009, apparently to avoid a federal prison term due to begin a few days later. His wife Pam, whom he had married about two years before his death, returned home from running errands and discovered her husband in his green Ford Fairmont, which was still running, at the rear of their property in Parrottsville, Tennessee. Mrs. Sutton said, "He called it his three-jar car because he gave three jugs of liquor for it." His daughter said he had told her in advance that he would die by suicide rather than go to jail, adding that he had "the strength to die the way he lived: according to his own wishes and no one else's."

Sutton's body was initially interred at a family graveyard in Mount Sterling, North Carolina. On October 24, 2009, it was relocated to his property in Parrottsville, and a private memorial service was held. His body was carried to its new resting spot by horse and carriage. Sutton's memorial grew in spectacle as country music singer Hank Williams Jr. flew in to pay his respects. A small memorial was also held for close friends and family.

A conventional grave marker was used at the head of Sutton's grave, reading "Marvin Popcorn Sutton / Ex-Moonshiner / October 5, 1946 / March 16, 2009". He had prepared a footstone in advance for his gravesite, and for years he had kept it by his front porch and had kept his casket ready in his living room. The epitaph on his footstone reads "Popcorn Said Fuck You".

== Tributes and popular culture ==
- Neal Hutcheson produced the documentary This is the Last Dam Run of Likker I'll Ever Make in 2002.
- Neal Hutcheson produced the television documentary The Last One, which went on to win a regional Emmy.
- Sutton's long-estranged daughter Sky Sutton wrote a self-published book in 2009 entitled Daddy Moonshine: The Story of Marvin "Popcorn" Sutton (ASIN B0027MNMC2)
- Singer-songwriter Hank Williams III sings about Sutton in the song "Moonshiner's Life" on his 2010 album Rebel Within
- Some of the prior Hutcheson documentary footage of Sutton was used in the 2011–12 season of the Moonshiners television series produced by Discovery Channel
- A brief photographic book about Sutton was released in 2012 – Popcorn Sutton The Making and Marketing of a Hillbilly Hero, text by Tom Wilson Jester with photographs by Don Dudenbostel (72 pp., Dudenbostel Photography, March 7, 2012, ISBN 978-0615585130)
- Another Hutcheson documentary about Sutton was released in 2014 called Popcorn Sutton—A Hell of a Life
- A biography, memoir and photobook titled The Moonshiner Popcorn Sutton was released in 2021 and won the Outstanding Book/Independent Spirit Award from the 2022 Independent Publishers Book Awards and a 2022 National Indie Excellence Award, and was the grand prizer winner of the 30th Annual Writer's Digest Book Awards.

== Popcorn Sutton's Tennessee White Whiskey ==
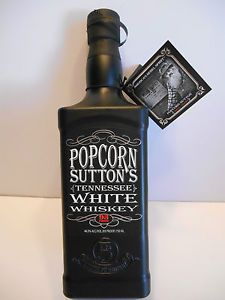
A bottle of the namesake whiskey (c. 2013)

On November 9, 2010, Hank Williams Jr. announced his partnership with J&M Concepts LLC and widow Pam Sutton to distill and distribute a brand of whiskey named after Sutton that was asserted to follow his legacy. Dubbed "Popcorn Sutton's Tennessee White Whiskey", it was marketed as having been produced on stills designed by Sutton using his secret family recipe, and techniques Sutton entrusted to former Supercross professional Jamey Grosser of J&M Concepts.

Country music stars attending the launch event included Martina McBride, Jamey Johnson, Randy Houser, Travis Tritt, Tanya Tucker, Zac Brown, Josh Thompson, Kentucky Headhunters, Little Big Town, Colt Ford, Montgomery Gentry, Jaron and the Long Road to Love, and Lee Brice. According to press reports, Popcorn Sutton's Tennessee White Whiskey would be initially distributed in Tennessee and throughout the southeast.

On October 25, 2013, Jack Daniel's Properties, Inc. filed suit against the distiller of Popcorn Sutton's whiskey, claiming that the newly redesigned bottle, with its square shape, beveled shoulders, and white-on-black label, too closely resembled their own. The lawsuit said that the design "...is likely to cause purchasers and prospective purchasers of the product to believe mistakenly that it is a new Tennessee white whiskey product in the Jack Daniel's line." The suit asked that all current existing bottles be taken off the market and that all profits from the sales of those bottles be handed over to Jack Daniel's. The lawsuit was settled in 2014 with undisclosed terms, and as of May 2016, the Sutton brand's bottle design has been substantially changed. The brand now uses a clear, round bottle with a smaller label.

In 2014, Popcorn Sutton Distilling opened a new distillery in Newport, Tennessee, the county seat of Cocke County. Copper stills for the facility were made by Vendome Copper and Brass in Louisville, Kentucky. The CEO of Popcorn Sutton Distilling is Megan Kvamme.

In March 2015, John Lunn, who had until then been master distiller of George Dickel Tennessee whiskey since 2005, joined Popcorn Sutton Distilling as its new master distiller. In July 2016, Allisa Henley, long time employee and Master Distiller at George Dickel, joined John Lunn at Popcorn Sutton Distilling.

In December 2016, the Popcorn Sutton Distillery was sold to the Sazerac Company. The sale included only the distillery, not the brands, which are owned by Popcorn Sutton Distilling LLC, which is based in Ohio. Lunn and Henley and the other employees of the distillery became employees of the Sazerac Company. At the time of the announcement, it had not been decided whether or not the Popcorn Sutton brands would continue to be produced under contract by the distillery.
