= Neal Hutcheson =

American filmmaker

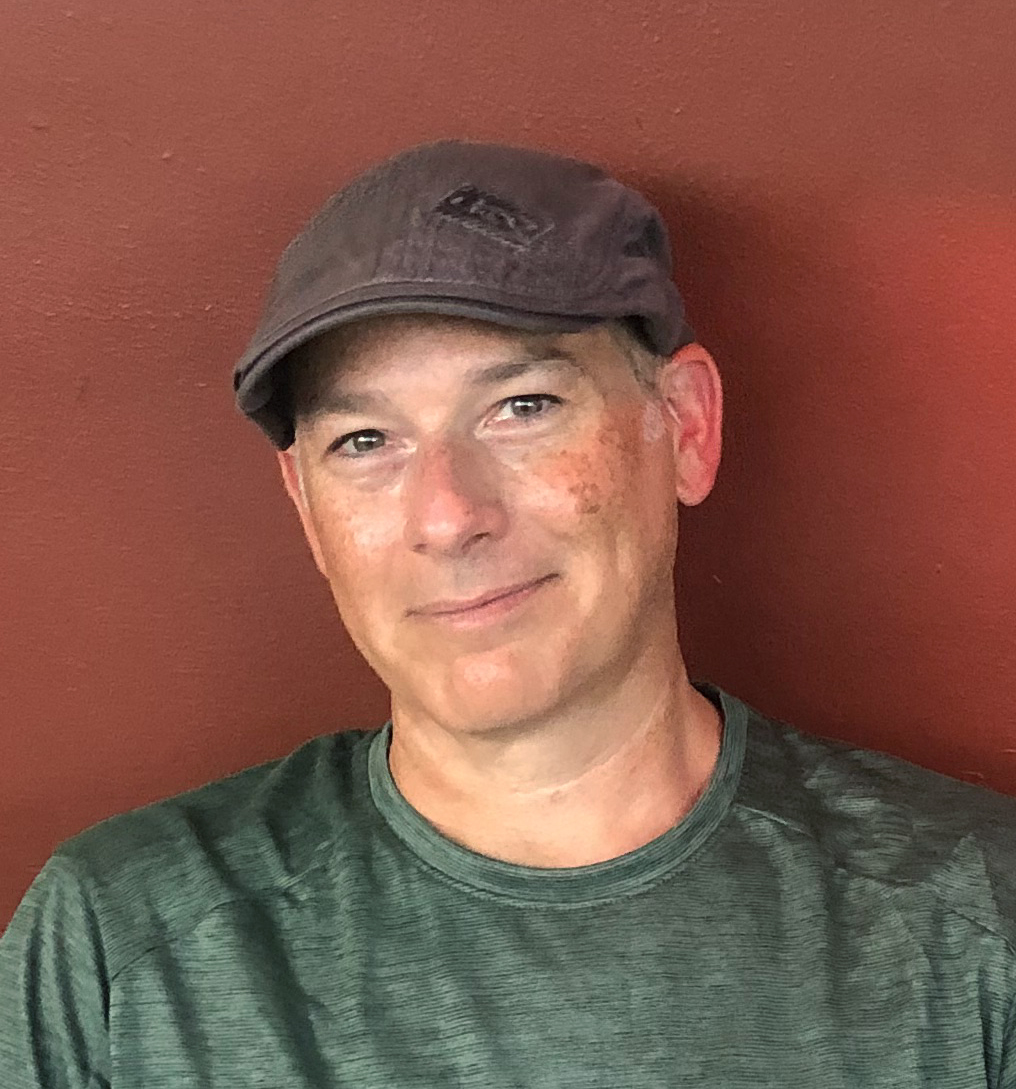
Filmmaker Neal Hutcheson

Neal Hutcheson (born 1969) is an American filmmaker, photographer, and author. He has received three regional Emmy Awards for documentaries on regional culture, language, and identity. He has produced 21 television documentaries on topics such as Appalachian culture, heritage fisheries on the North Carolina Outer Banks, Cherokee language preservation efforts, African American vernacular speech, and climate change. Hutcheson’s most visible work has featured Popcorn Sutton, a moonshiner from Western North Carolina. The Moonshiner Popcorn Sutton, a book of photos, interviews and essays by Hutcheson, was released in 2021 and received a National Indie Excellence Award and the Outstanding Book—Independent Spirit Award from The Independent Publisher Book Awards, the largest unaffiliated book contest in the world, and was the grand prize winner of the 30th Annual Writer's Digest Self-Published Book Awards. Hutcheson works as a producer for the Language & Life Project at North Carolina State University and is a contributing producer to independent production companies CORVA and Sucker Punch Pictures.

== Selected filmography ==
- The Prison Sutras (documentary short, 1997)
- Jornada del Muerto (documentary short, 1998)
- Indian by Birth—The Lumbee Dialect (documentary short, 1999)
- Mountain Talk (2004)
- Voices of North Carolina (2005)
- The Queen Family—Appalachian Tradition and Back Porch Music (documentary short, 2006)
- The Prince of Dark Corners (2007)
- The Carolina Brogue (documentary short, 2008)
- The Outlaw Lewis Redmond (2008)
- The Last One—Moonshine in Appalachia (2009)
- Core.Sounders—Living from the Sea (2014)
- Popcorn Sutton—A Hell of a Life (2014, 2025)
- First Language—The Race to Save Cherokee (Neal Hutcheson, Danica Cullinan, 2015)
- Talking Black in America (Neal Hutcheson, Danica Cullinan, 2019)
- Signing Black in America (documentary short; Danica Cullinan, Neal Hutcheson, 2020)
- Land and Water Revisited / Revisitando Tierra y Agua (Kirk French, Elijah Hermitt, Neal Hutcheson, 2021)
- Talking Black in America—Roots (2022)
- Storyteller (2023)
- Talking Black in America—Performance Traditions (2024)
- Talking Black in America—Social Justice (2025)
- A Century After Nanook (dir. Kirk French; co-producer, co-editor Neal Hutcheson, 2025)
- Origin of the Dream (dir. Jason Miller; Editor, co-producer Neal Hutcheson, 2026)
- Threads that Bind—the Story of the Pacific Northwest Woolly Dog (dir. Kirk French; co-producer, co-editor Neal Hutcheson, 2026).

== Author ==
- “Smoky Mountain English: If These Hills Could Talk.”
- “Gary Carden: Folklorist, Playwright, and Storyteller.” (North Carolina Folklore Journal, 2006)
- “Inclemented that Way.” (Jonathan Williams: The Lord of Orchards, 2017)
- “Negotiating Language Presentation: Linguists, Communities, and Producers.”
- The Moonshiner Popcorn Sutton (2021, 2024)
- Stories I Lived to Tell by Gary Carden (Editor and Foreword Author, 2024)
- The Lonesome Death of Marvin 'Popcorn' Sutton (The Assembly, 2024)

== Honors ==
- Artist’s Fellowship, North Carolina Arts Council, 2005
- The North Carolina Film Award, 2008 Carolina Film and Video Festival
- Emmy, Cultural Documentary, 2009, Southeast region
- Brown-Hudson Folklore Award, North Carolina Folklore Society, 2011
- Emmy Nomination, Cultural Documentary, 2015 Midsouth region
- Best Public Service Film, 2015 American Indian Film Festival
- Best Regional Documentary, 2015 Native American Film Festival of the Southeast
- Best Documentary, 2015 Red Rock Film Festival
- Emmy, Cultural Documentary, 2016, Midsouth region
- Emmy, Cultural Documentary, 2020, Midsouth region
- Emmy Nomination, Cultural Documentary, 2021, National Capital Chesapeake Bay region
- 2022 Outstanding Book — Independent Spirit Award, Independent Publisher Book Awards
- 2022 National Indie Excellence Award, 16th Annual National Indie Excellence Awards
- Grand Prize Winner, 30th Annual Writer's Digest Self-Published Book Awards, 2022.
- Emmy Nomination, Historical Documentary, 2023, Southeast region
- Emmy Nomination, Cultural Documentary, 2025, Northwest region
- Emmy Nomination, Topical Documentary, 2026, Southeast region
