= Jamey Grosser =

American motorcycle racer

Jamey Grosser, originally from New Hope, Minnesota is a former professional Supercross racer and current serial entrepreneur. As a racer, Grosser competed on the AMA Supercross and Motocross Championship tours from 1996 to 2008 where he earned the nickname People's Champ. He raced under many top racing teams including Moto XXX, Rockstar Suzuki, DGY, Cepsa Honda in Europe and owned his own race team WSA SnoX.

As an entrepreneur, Grosser founded JG Marketing Group that was acquired by Cities2night.com in 2008 and was the founder and managing partner of J&M Concepts LLC, producers of Team Realtree Outdoor Energy and Popcorn Sutton's Tennessee White Whiskey.

Famed Appalachian legend Marvin "Popcorn" Sutton entrusted Grosser with his secret moonshine recipe prior to Sutton's death in 2009. Grosser's J&M Concepts, along with Hank Williams, Jr and Sutton's widow, Pam Sutton, began distilling and distributing "Popcorn Sutton's Tennessee White Whiskey" legally beginning in late 2010.
