= Appalachian Ski Mountain =

Ski area in North Carolina, United States

Appalachian Ski Mtn.
- Location in the United States
- Location: Watauga County, North Carolina, U.S.
- Nearest major city: Boone and Blowing Rock
- Coordinates: 36.174°N 81.662°W
- Vertical: 365 feet (111 m)
- Top elevation: 4,000 feet (1,219 m)
- Base elevation: 3,635 feet (1,108 m)
- Skiable area: 27 acres (11 ha)
- Trails: 11
- Lift system: 3 chairs, 3 surface
- Terrain parks: 3
- Snowfall: 60 inches (150 cm)
- Snowmaking: 100%
- Night skiing: 100%
- Website: appskimtn.com

Appalachian Ski Mountain is a ski area in the eastern United States, one of three ski mountains in the Watauga County area of western North Carolina. It is located off of US 321 between Blowing Rock and Boone.

== History ==
1962: Around the time that Cataloochee Ski Area opened to mark the advent of commercial alpine skiing in North Carolina, Blowing Rock Ski Lodge followed suit in the state’s western High Country region.

1968: Name changed to Appalachian Ski Mtn.

== The Mountain ==
The mountain offers 13 ski trails consisting of 2 beginner, 6 intermediate, 3 advanced trails, and 4 terrain parks. To access the 13 trails, there are two quad chairs, a double chair, a handle tow, and two conveyor lifts. The longest trail is Orchard Run at a half mile (800 m). The base elevation is 3,635 feet (1,108 m) and a peak elevation of 4,000 feet (1,200 m), yielding a vertical drop of 365 feet (111 m). The entire ski area is lit for night skiing and is 100% covered by snowmaking.

== Snowmaking ==
All of Appalachian's slopes are covered with snowmaking. Appalachian's ski area management has a philosophy of making snow on closed slopes or during non-skiing hours as much as possible. Appalachian has a practice of making snow up to the next to last day of the season if weather permits. Appalachian's snowmaking capability has allowed the ski area to remain open through its scheduled closing day for nine consecutive years as of the 2008-09 season. During peak season, it is common for the snow base depth to be over 100 inches, often exceeding that of many western resorts.

== Terrain Parks ==
Appalachian has 3 terrain parks, including North Carolina's only Burton Progression Park, and one of only 11 Burton Progression Parks in North America. The 3 terrain parks are AppalTop, Appaljack, and Appal Jam. The terrain park staff at Appalachian rebuilds one of the parks on a weekly basis. These rebuilds are conducted after skiing hours. Appalachian has at least 2 terrain park staff members on site every session.

Starting the 2010-2011 ski season Appalachian has introduced a policy requiring all people intending to use the upper level terrain parks to have a park pass. To receive a pass, riders must watch a short video on park safety and etiquette and complete a short 10 question quiz on the video. Additionally, riders must pay a $5 fee for an annual pass or $3 for a day pass. All riders under the age of 18 must have a parent or legal guardian present before being able to complete the necessary paper work. This program is designed to improve rider awareness and promote a safe environment for everyone. Terrain Park Features

Rails	Boxes	Other
35' Flat Rail	24' Trapezoid Box	10' x 16' Red Bull Wallride
19' Round Flat Rail	6'7" Kicker Box	4'6" Red Bull Can Bonk
10' Double Barrel Flat Rail	8' Flat Box Top	8' DVS Picnic Table
12' Flat Rail 2' tall	20' Rainbow Box	19' Lift Tower Jib
12' Flat Rail	12' Flat Box	16' Adjustable Wall
16' Flat Rail	12' Juice Box	6' Pole Jam
36' M Rail (Triple Kink)	16' Juice Box	19' Lift Tower Jib
20' Down Handrail	20' Flat Box	19' Lift Tower Jib
20' Handrail	20' C Box	41' Lift Tower Jib
20' C Rail	20' C Box	20' Ledge Wedge
25' Flat Down Flat Rail	30' Down Flat Down Box
24' Flat Down Rail	30' ATP Logo Box
25' Trapezoid Rail	24' Shark Fin Box
24' Flat Rail	24' Flat Box
24' Flat Rail	24' Flat Box
24' Flat Rail	16' Flat Box
20' Down Flat Kink Rail	20' Flat Box
32' S Rail
32' Rainbow Rail
24' Elbow Rail
30' Down Flat Down Kink Rail
15' Flat Down Rail
10' Up Rail

== Services ==
In the bottom of the lodge, ski/snowboard equipment can be rented as well as helmets. The ski rental repository has 2125 pairs of skis, 450 snowboards, and 75 skiboards. Equipment that can be rented includes bibs, gloves, jackets, goggles, and helmets.

The lodge has a slopeside restaurant open for breakfast, lunch, and dinner. A gift shop and ski shop is also located in the lodge.

In addition to skiing and snowboarding, App Ski Mountain has an outdoor skating rink. The skating rink is 6,000 square feet (557.4 square meters), and offers night skating. As with ski/snowboard equipment, ice skates can be rented from the base lodge.

Appalachian Ski Mtn. is the home of the French Swiss Ski College. Ski instructors at the French Swiss Ski College have taught various groups how to ski, ranging from US military divisions to handicapped athletes to southerners who have never seen snow. Instruction is offered in groups or individually on a daily basis. Appalachian is the only southeastern ski area that advertises terrain park instruction.

== Annual events ==
- Anniversary Weekend - First Weekend in December
- Fireworks - December 31
- Meltdown Games - Closing Weekend
