= Maggie Valley, North Carolina =

- Town
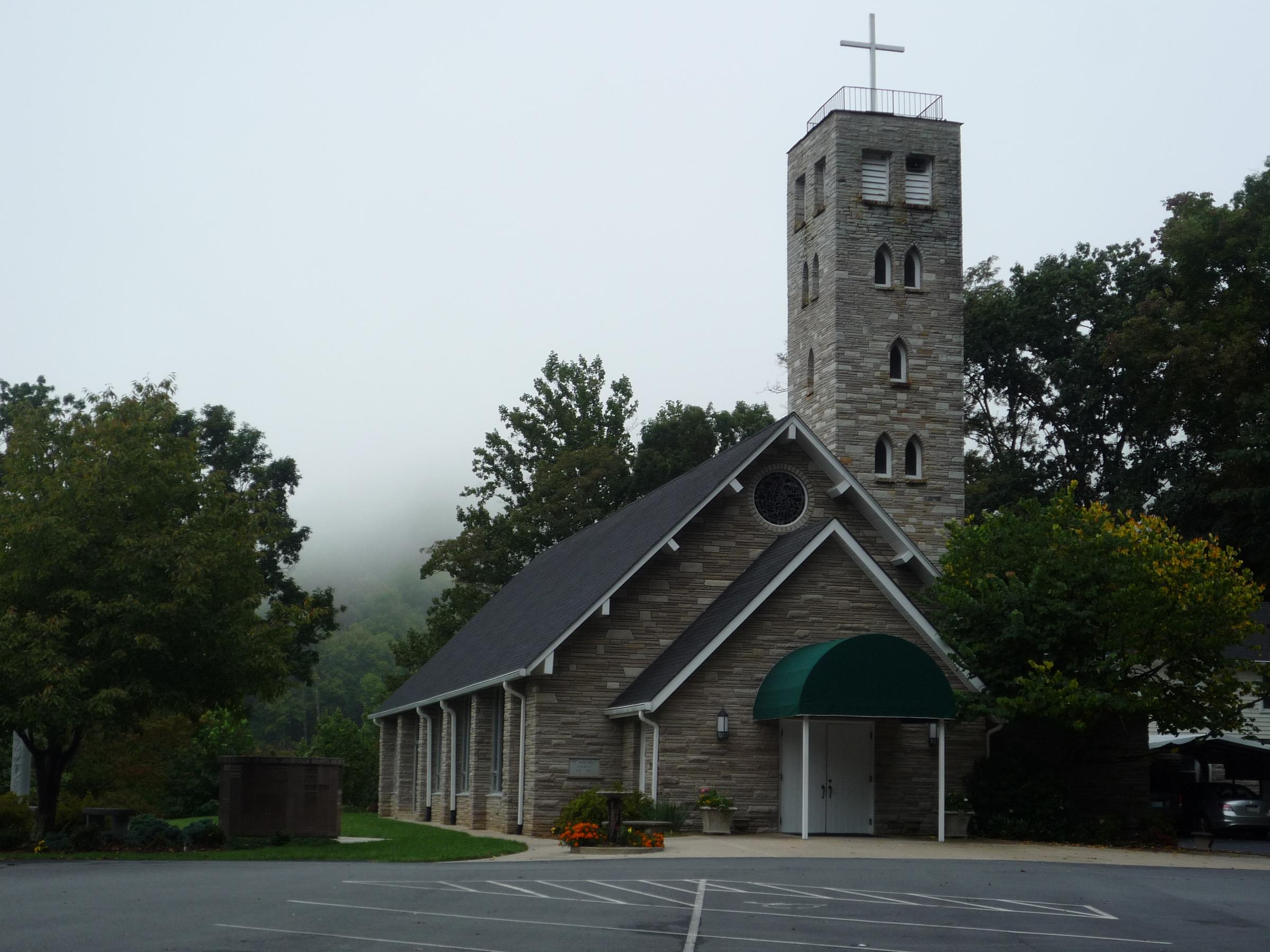
- St. Margaret of Scotland Church

- Seal

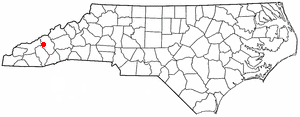
- Location of Maggie Valley, North Carolina
- Coordinates: 35°31′16″N 83°02′47″W
- Country: United States
- State: North Carolina
- County: Haywood
- Named for: Daughter of man who requested a post office

Area
  - Total: 3.39 sq mi (8.78 km^{2})
  - Land: 3.39 sq mi (8.78 km^{2})
  - Water: 0 sq mi (0.00 km^{2})
- Elevation: 2,792 ft (851 m)

Population (2020)
  - Total: 1,687
  - Density: 497.7/sq mi (192.17/km^{2})
- Time zone: UTC-5 (Eastern (EST))
  - Summer (DST): UTC-4 (EDT)
- ZIP code: 28751
- Area code: 828
- FIPS code: 37-40600
- GNIS feature ID: 2406076
- Website: www.maggievalleync.gov

Maggie Valley is a town in Haywood County, North Carolina, United States. The population was 1,687 at the 2020 census. A popular tourist destination, it is home to Cataloochee Ski Area and the former Ghost Town in the Sky amusement park. Maggie Valley is part of the Asheville metropolitan area.

The community gets its name from Maggie Mae Setzer; her father John "Uncle Jack" Sidney Setzer founded the area's first post office and named it after one of his daughters.

== History ==
Before European colonization, what is now Maggie Valley was inhabited by the Cherokee people and other indigenous peoples for thousands of years. The Cherokee in western North Carolina are known as the Eastern Band of Cherokee Indians, a federally recognized tribe.

When John Sidney Setzer's daughter Maggie was ten years old, he asked the Postmaster General for permission to establish a post office for the area. He had to prove the need for one, and once he did, he submitted four names: Cora, Mettie and Maggie (his three daughters), and Jonathan (the name of the creek running through the community). The name Maggie was selected and the post office opened May 10, 1904. Maggie was thirteen years old at the time and she helped run the post office until she married Ira Plyant and moved away in 1907. "Miss Maggie" has acted as the town's "goodwill ambassador" since 1985, when Jeannie Reninger became the first to play the role. She wears a yellow bonnet, green shirt, yellow apron and red skirt, all of which appear in the image the town trademarked in 2000.

When area businesses began promoting the area as a tourist destination in 1949, they encouraged the use of the name "Maggie Valley". Ghost Town in the Sky, a popular Wild West theme park from 1961 to 2003, helped establish the name by calling itself "Ghost Town in Maggie Valley".

Maggie Valley was officially incorporated as a town in 1974. The post office changed from Maggie to Maggie Valley at that time.

== Geography ==
Maggie Valley is in west-central Haywood County. U.S. Route 19 is the main road through the town, leading east 35 miles (56 km) to Asheville and west over Soco Gap 16 miles (26 km) to Cherokee.

According to the U.S. Census Bureau, the town has an area of 3.2 square miles (8.2 km^{2}), all land.

== Wildlife ==
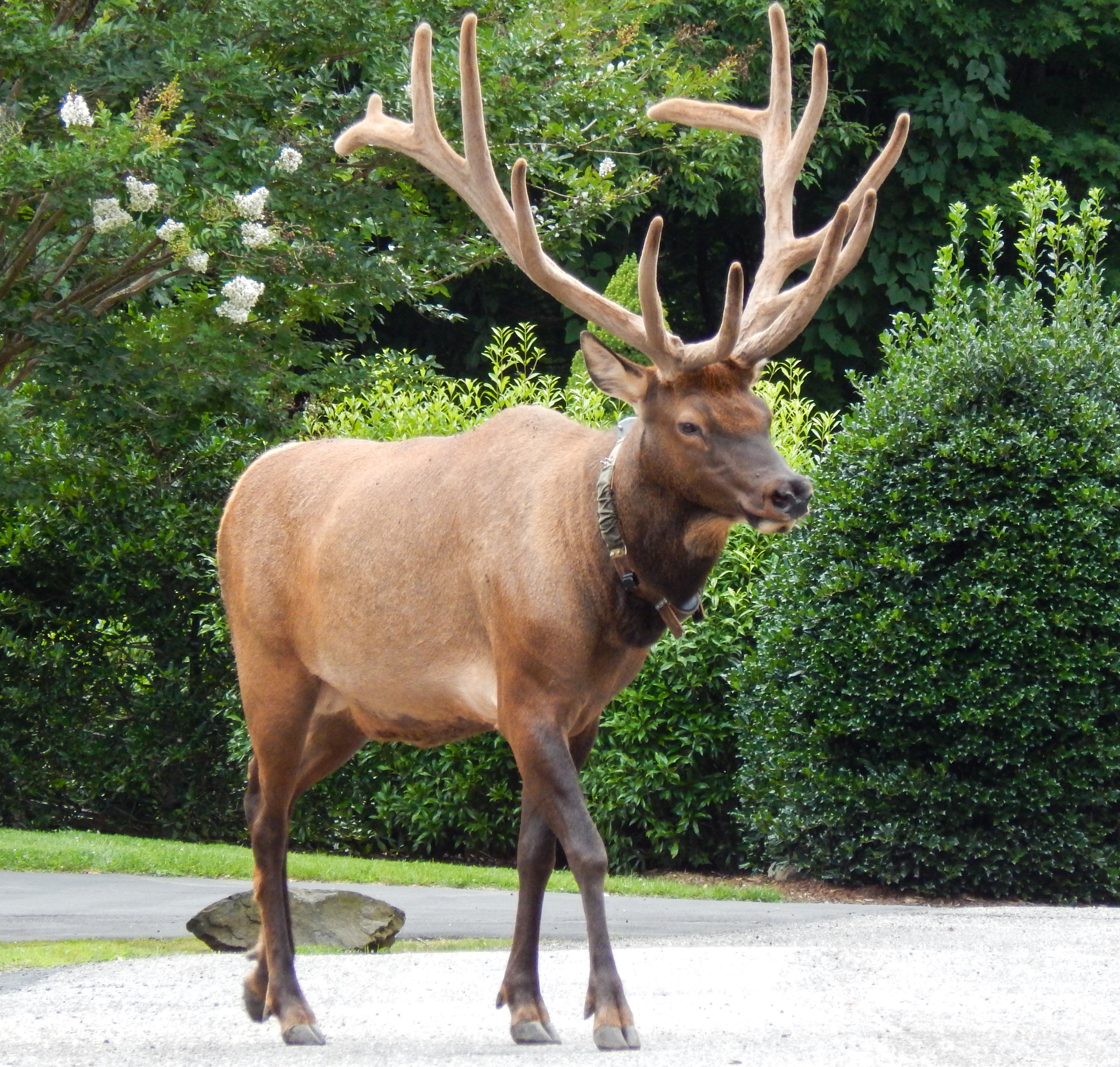
An elk in a Maggie Valley neighborhood.

Elk were copious throughout the United States, but numbers decreased in the mid-19th century because of overhunting and habitat loss. In 2001, the Rocky Mountain Elk Foundation, the National Park Service and other partners joined to restore wild elk to the Great Smoky Mountains in the Cataloochee Valley near Maggie Valley. Most elk are found in Cataloochee Valley, which is a perfect viewing area in the southeastern section of the Great Smoky Mountains National Park. But the elk have been known to wander out of the park and walk toward Maggie Valley. There are an estimated 200 elk in the Maggie Valley area currently.

Black bears are occasionally seen in and around Maggie Valley. During winter, the black bears are inactive for a short amount of time and exhibit some physiological responses to low food storage and temperatures. But a result of their brief hibernation is that there are more bear sightings. This is risky because they can be looking for food in neighborhoods or killed on roads. Locals strongly suggest never approaching a bear to photograph it, or leaving food or garbage out, and taking in any bird feeders that are not monitored (especially at night).

== Demographics ==
Historical population
Census	Pop.	Note	%±
1980	202		—
1990	185		−8.4%
2000	607		228.1%
2010	1,150		89.5%
2020	1,687		46.7%
U.S. Decennial Census

=== 2020 census ===
Maggie Valley racial composition
Race	Number	Percentage
White (non-Hispanic)	1,475	87.43%
Black or African American (non-Hispanic)	23	1.36%
Native American	15	0.89%
Asian	30	1.78%
Other/Mixed	69	4.09%
Hispanic or Latino	75	4.45%

As of the 2020 United States census, there were 1,687 people, 833 households, and 562 families residing in the town.

=== 2000 census ===
As of the census of 2000, there were 607 people, 297 households, and 179 families residing in the town. The population density was 372.8 people per square mile (143.9 people/km^{2}). There were 565 housing units at an average density of 347.0 per square mile (134.0/km^{2}). The racial makeup of the town was 96.38% White, 1.32% African American, 0.66% Native American, 0.66% Asian, 0.16% from other races, and 0.82% from two or more races. Hispanic or Latino of any race were 0.16% of the population.

There were 297 households, of which 16.8% had children under the age of 18 living with them, 52.2% were married couples living together, 6.4% had a female householder with no husband present, and 39.7% were non-families. 33.0% of all households were made up of individuals, and 11.8% had someone living alone who was 65 years of age or older. The average household size was 2.04 and the average family size was 2.56.

In the town, the population was spread out, with 14.0% under age 18, 5.1% from 18 to 24, 23.2% from 25 to 44, 33.8% from 45 to 64, and 23.9% who were 65 or older. The median age was 49. For every 100 females, there were 92.1 males. For every 100 females 18 and over, there were 89.8 males.

The median income for a household in the town was $29,808, and the median income for a family was $40,417. Males had a median income of $27,813 versus $20,865 for females. The per capita income for the town was $17,211. About 9.8% of families and 11.7% of the population were below the poverty line, including 15.2% of those under age 18 and 10.7% of those age 65 or over.

== Notable people ==
- Raymond Fairchild, Society for the Preservation of Bluegrass Music in America “Hall of Greats" member.
- Moonshiner Marvin "Popcorn" Sutton.
