= Mount Sterling (Great Smoky Mountains) =

Mountain in North Carolina and Tennessee, United States

Coordinates: 35.7023°N 83.1222°W

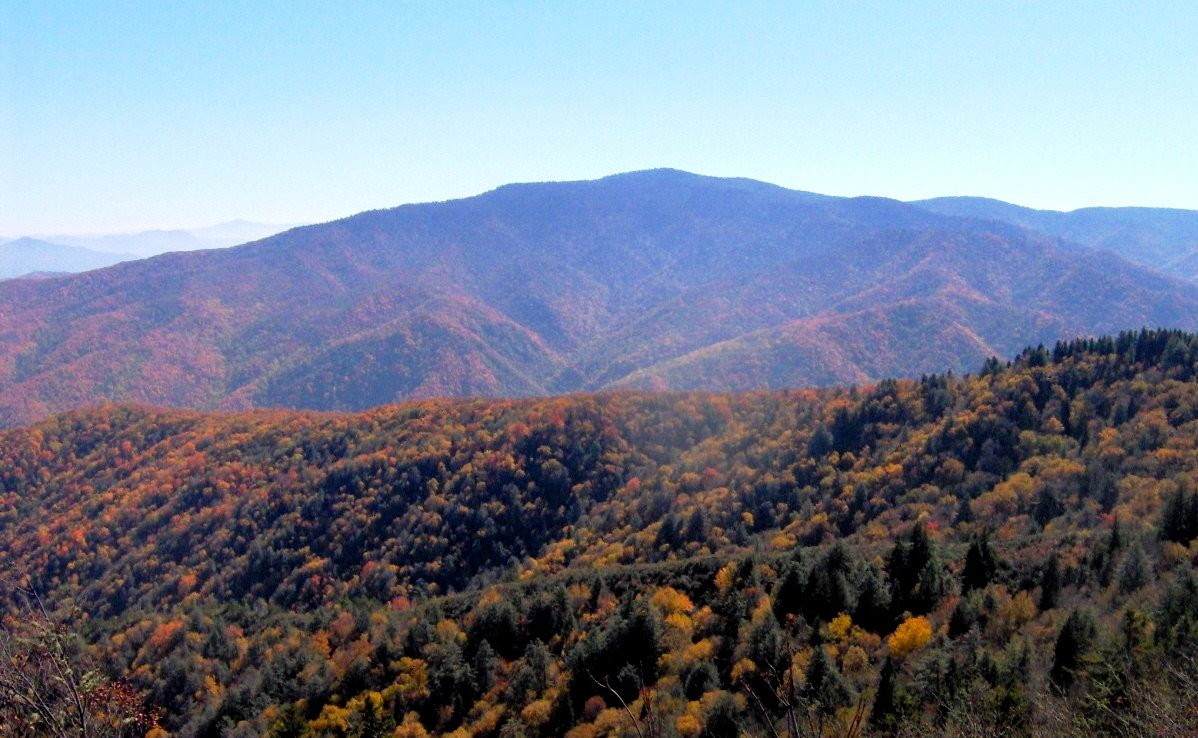
Mount Sterling viewed from Mount Cammerer

Mount Sterling is a mountain in the Great Smoky Mountains of Haywood County, North Carolina and Cocke County, Tennessee, located in the southeastern United States. It reaches an elevation of 5,842 feet (1,781 m) above sea level. The summit is topped by an abandoned fire tower that overlooks other nearby peaks.

Mount Sterling crowns Mount Sterling Ridge, a 7-mile (11 km) ridge that gradually descends northward from the flanks of Big Cataloochee Mountain (on the Balsam Mountain crest) to the Pigeon River valley. The ridge divides the Cataloochee area to the east from the Big Creek Valley (which represents the fringe of the Cosby area) to the west. The communities of Mount Sterling, North Carolina, and Waterville, North Carolina are located in the Pigeon River valley at the ridge's northern extreme. Geologically, Mount Sterling consists mainly of Precambrian metamorphic sandstone of the Ocoee Supergroup, formed nearly a billion years ago from ancient ocean sediments. The summit of Mount Sterling is surrounded by a stand of Southern Appalachian spruce–fir forest.

== History ==
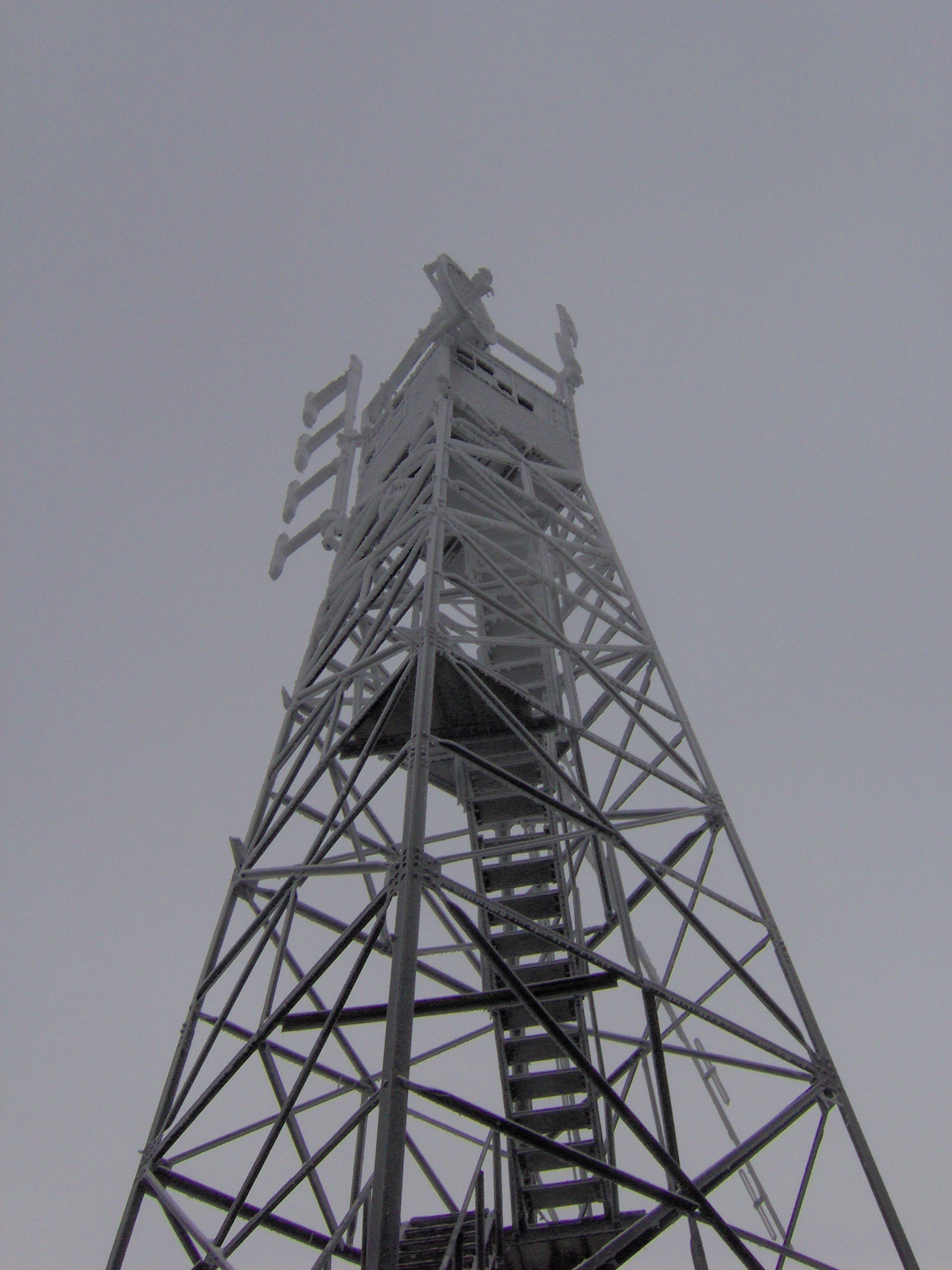
Firetower atop Mount Sterling

According to early residents in the Mount Sterling area, the mountain was named after a 2-foot (0.61 m) wide streak of lead in the bed of the Pigeon River at the mountain's northern base. These early residents mistakenly thought the lead was silver. The Big Creek campground, at the northern base of Mount Sterling Ridge, occupies what was once the community of Mount Sterling, North Carolina.

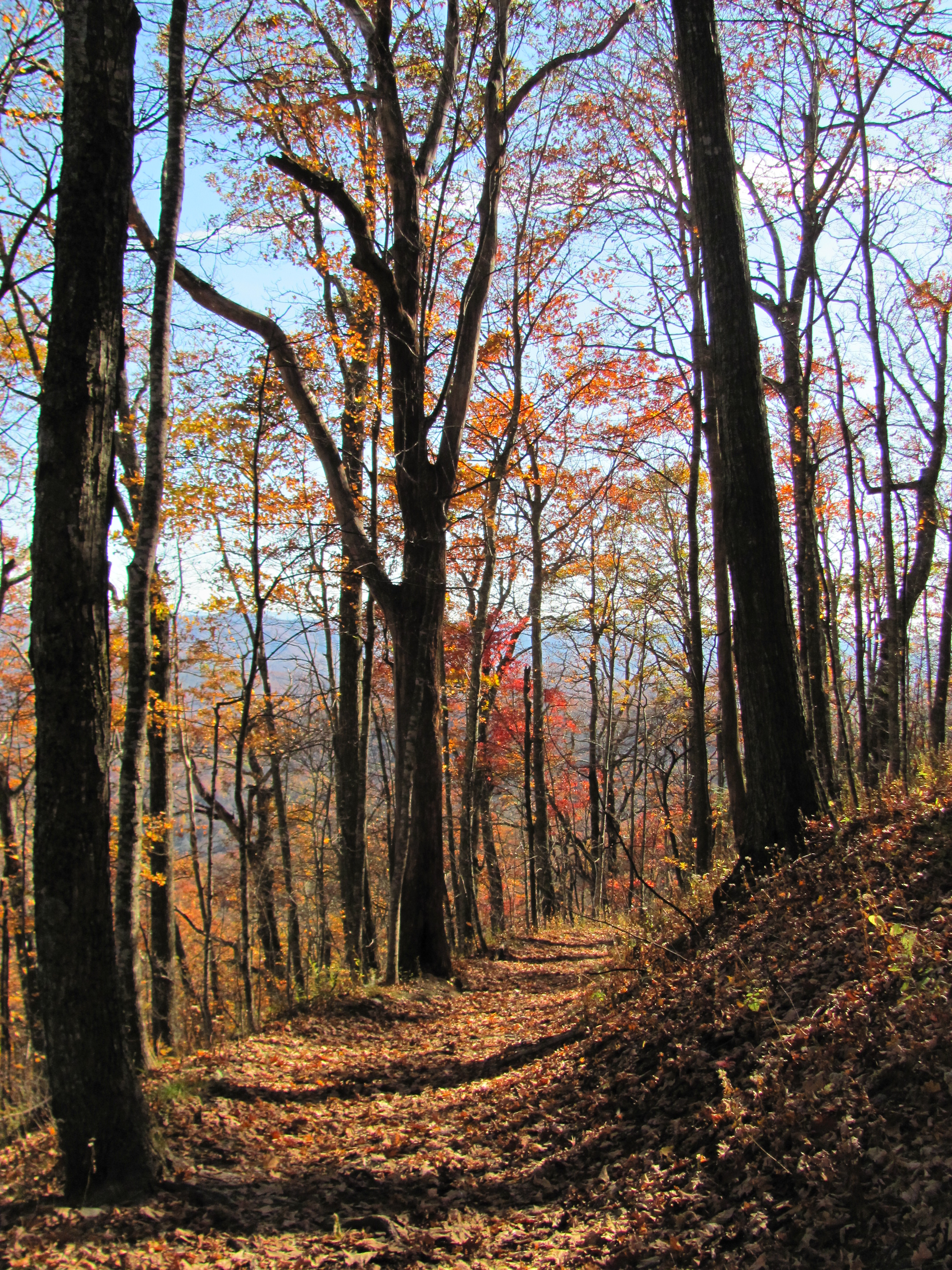
Mount Sterling fall foliage

During the U.S. Civil War, Cataloochee and the remote valleys at the base of Mount Sterling became popular hideouts for deserters, and both Union and Confederate detachments consistently made raids into the area to find them. Raiders and bushwhackers navigated through the area by following a trail that connected Cosby and Cataloochee via Mount Sterling. One local legend relates an incident in which Confederate Captain Albert Teague swept through Cataloochee and arrested three alleged Union sympathizers. Teague marched them up to Mount Sterling where he ordered one of the detainees, a well-known local fiddle player named Henry Grooms, to play a tune on his fiddle. Grooms chose the somber "Bonaparte's Retreat." When he finished, Teague executed all three detainees.

Around 1903, the Cataloochee Lumber Company established the village of Crestmont at the northwest base of Mount Sterling to house a labor force needed to log the Big Creek Valley and operate a timber mill. Crestmont thrived until 1907, when the company commenced logging operations in the area. In the late 1920s, the Carolina Power and Light Company established the community of Waterville at the mountain's northern base, near the confluence of Big Creek and the Pigeon River. Waterville provided the labor force needed to operate the company's Walters Plant, which housed the powerhouse for the Waterville reservoir further upstream. While vestiges of Waterville survived, Crestmont was absorbed into the Great Smoky Mountains National Park in the 1930s and converted into what is now the Big Creek Campground.

The balsam wooly adelgid infestation, which killed off most of the park's fraser firs, was first noticed in the Smokies atop Mount Sterling in 1963.

== Access ==
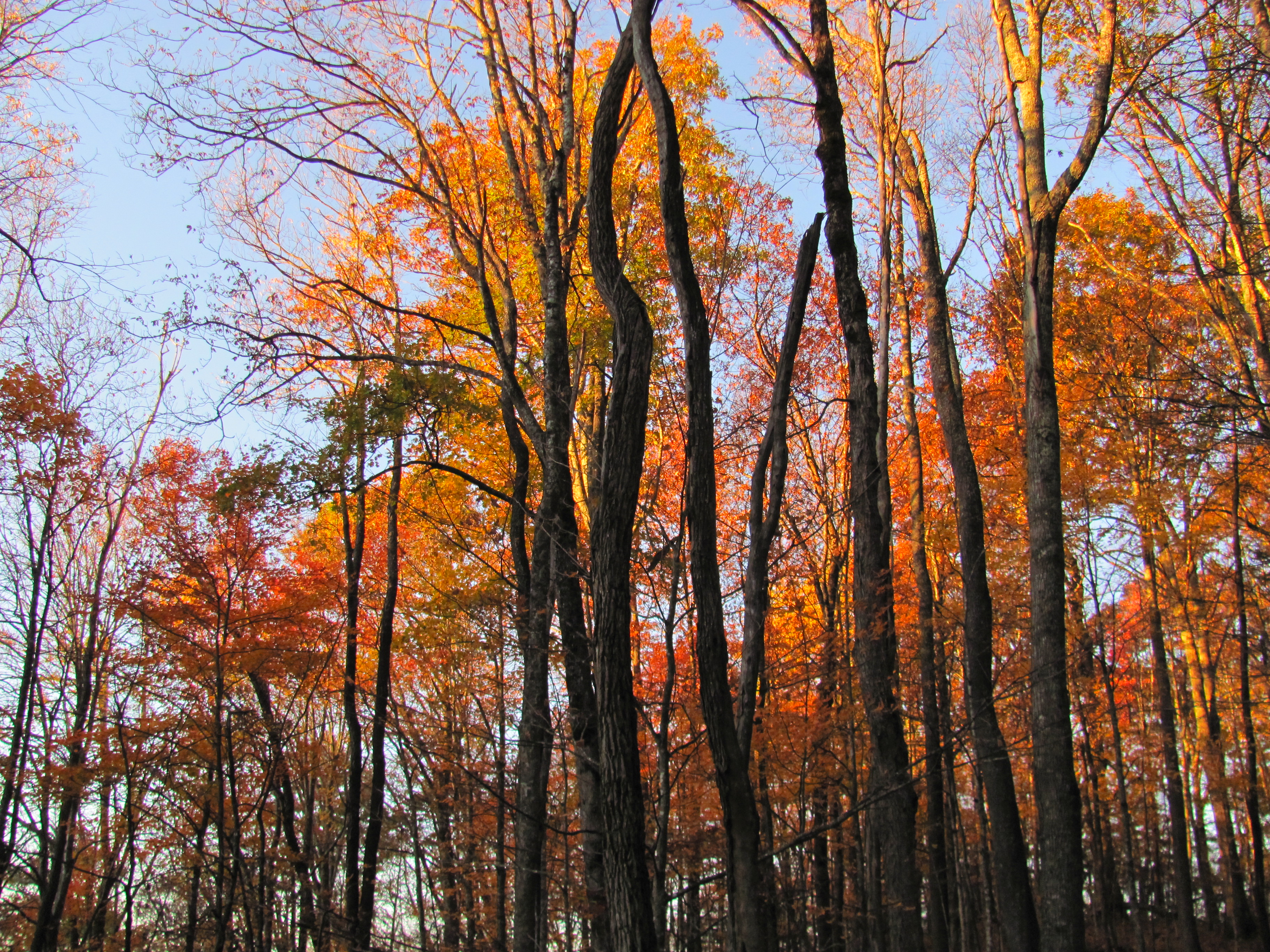
Mount Sterling fall foliage

A long gravel road connects the Big Creek ranger station (near Waterville) with the Cataloochee Campground. The trailhead for the 2.7-mile (4.3 km) Mount Sterling Trail is located near this road's halfway point at Mount Sterling Gap. The trail ascends to the summit.

The 5.3-mile (8.5 km) Mount Sterling Ridge Trail traverses the ridge's crest between Laurel Gap on Balsam Mountain and the summit of Mount Sterling. The 6.1-mile (9.8 km) Baxter Creek Trail connects the summit to the Big Creek Campground to the north. These two trails provide segments of the cross-country Benton MacKaye Trail. The Pretty Hollow Gap Trail connects Mount Sterling with Cataloochee to the east, and the Swallow Fork Trail connects the mountain with Walnut Bottom in the Big Creek Valley to the west.
