= Hatley Pointe =

Ski area in North Carolina, United States

- Location in the United States
- Location: Madison County, North Carolina, U.S.
- Nearest city: Mars Hill
- Coordinates: 35.955°N 82.509°W
- Vertical: 700 feet (213 m)
- Top elevation: 4,700 feet (1,433 m)
- Base elevation: 3,900 feet (1,189 m)
- Skiable area: 54 acres (22 ha)
- Trails: 23: 4 beginner; 8 intermediate; 3 advanced
- Longest run: Broadway; 1,800 feet (550 m)
- Lift system: 3 chairs
- Terrain parks: 1
- Snowmaking: 100%
- Night skiing: 100%
- Website: hatleypointe.com

Hatley Pointe (formerly Wolf Ridge Ski Resort) is a ski area in the eastern United States in western North Carolina. Five miles (8 km) from Interstate 26, it is located off of Puncheon Road in Mars Hill, North Carolina. The resort opened in 1970. It is Madison County's largest employer during the winter months. It is owned Deborah and David Hatley since March 2023.

== History ==
Wolf Laurel Slopes, later called Wolf Laurel Ski Resort, the resort opened in 1970. Five miles (8 km) from Interstate 26, it is located by Big Bald Mountain off of Puncheon Road in Mars Hill, North Carolina. It includes 500 acres (200 ha). It changed its name to Wolf Ridge Ski Resort in 2005.

With a top elevation of 4,700 feet (1,433 m) above sea level, Wolf Ridge has a maximum vertical drop of 700 feet (213 m). It includes 54 acres (22 ha) of skiable land. It opened the Breakaway section in 2007, including the Broadway ski slope located behind the lodge. By 2008 it had fifteen ski slopes and trails, with four of the slopes rated for beginners, nine intermediate, and only two as advance'. In January 2013, the resort had 23 slopes, including twelve beginner slopes, eight intermediate, and three advanced. Its longest run was3,700 feet (1,100 m) feet.

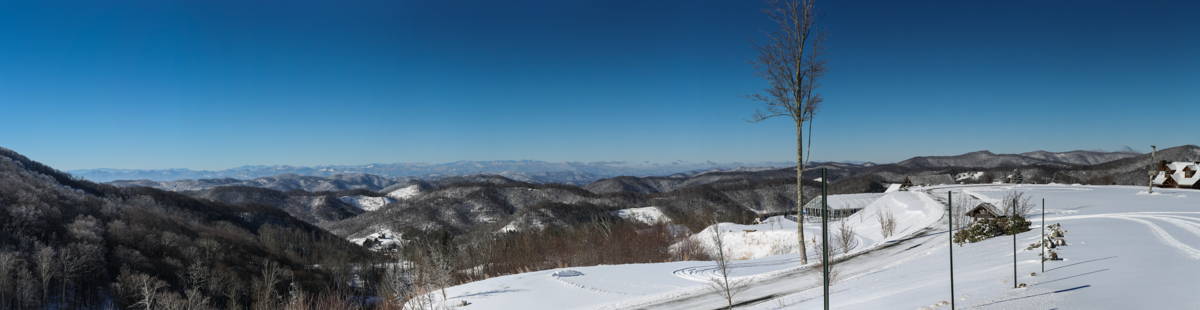
Wolf Laurel Ski Resort, January 2014

Western North Carolina's ski season typically four months, from November to March. On an in-season weekend day as of 2017, the resort has 1,000 visitors per day and averaged 50,000 to 60,000 visitors each season. The resort is Madison County's largest employer during the winter months.

Typical of the region's ski areas, the resort relies primarily on snowmaking for its slopes, which greatly limits the profitability of the ski resort. The resort first used snowmaking equipment in 1976; its snow guns were "homemade" by the owners of the resort. In December 2018, the resort opened for the season with 78 new snow guns.

Peak Resorts, Inc. attempted to purchase Wolf Ridge in January 2013 for $9.8 million providing $250,000 in a trust. Peak Resorts filed a suit for breach of contract on February 28, 2014 in U.S. District Court. However, in February 2014, the original owners resumed operations. The resort's lodge was damaged in a fire on March 26, 2014.

In March 2023, Wolf Ridge was purchased by Deborah and David Hatley for $8.4 million. After adding $12 million in improvements, they rebranded the resort as Hatley Pointe. When it opened on November 24, 2024, Hatley Pointe was operating fifteen trails, one quad lift and two surface lifts.

== Maps ==
- Trail Map
