= Cataloochee (Great Smoky Mountains) =

Valley in North Carolina, United States

Coordinates: 35.63972°N 83.08194°W

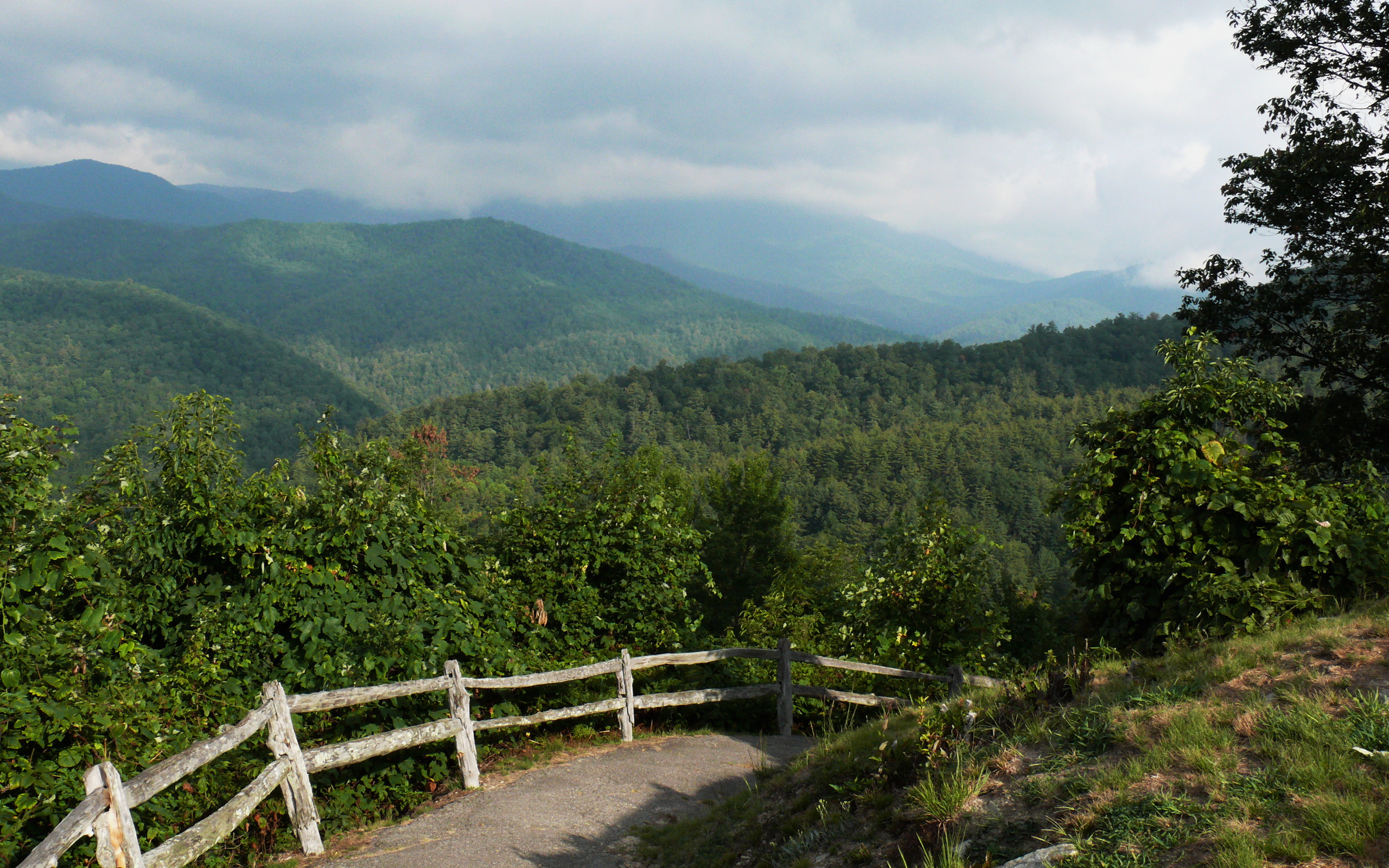
Cataloochee

Cataloochee is a valley in the Great Smoky Mountains of North Carolina, located in the Southeastern United States. Now a recreational and historic area within the Great Smoky Mountains National Park, Cataloochee was once home to a substantial Appalachian community and Cherokee hunting ground.

== Geology ==
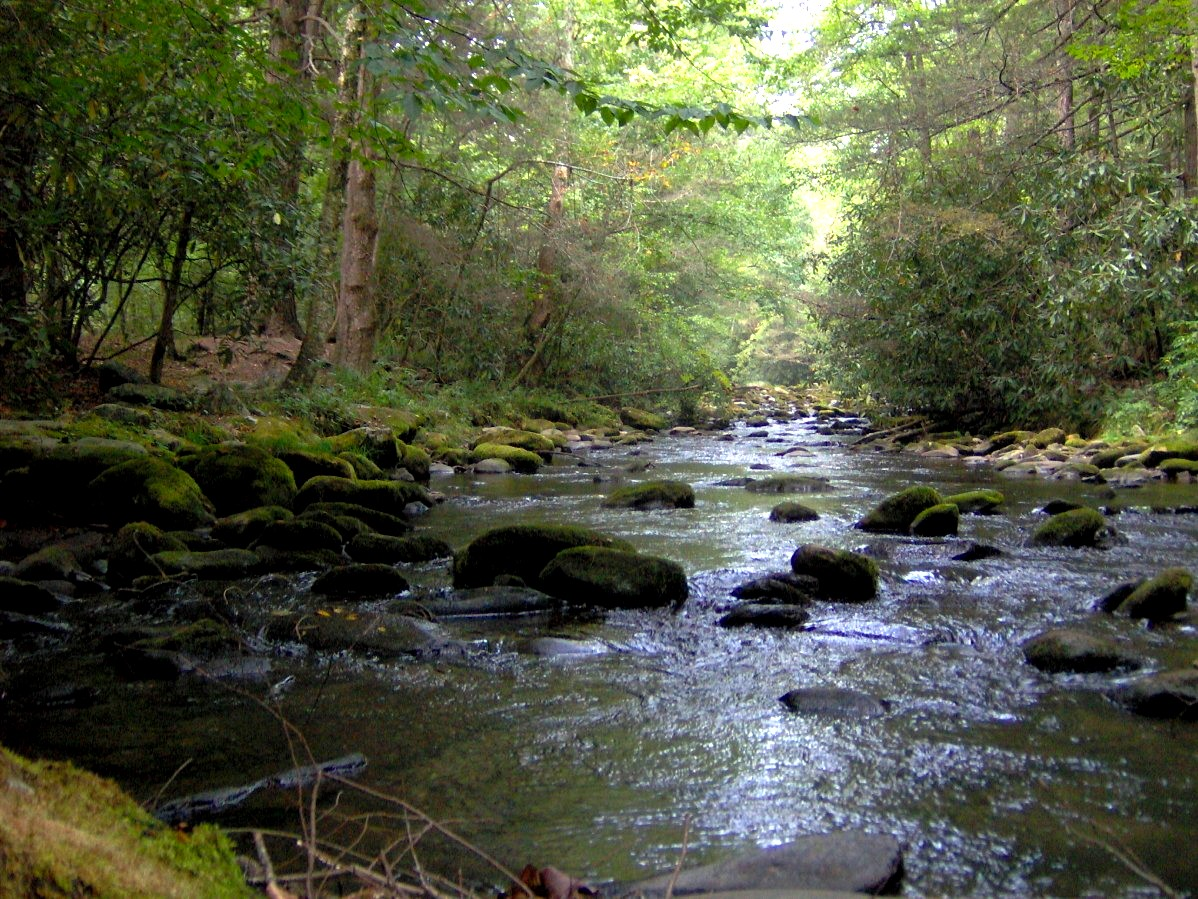
Palmer Creek in Big Cataloochee

Cataloochee consists of three narrow valleys running parallel to one another, and "walled in" by the high ridges of the Great Balsam Mountains. To the northwest is Sterling Ridge, and to the southeast is Cataloochee Divide, both of which rise above 5,000 feet for considerable stretches. To the southwest is the 6,155-foot Big Cataloochee Mountain along the Balsam crest, which runs perpendicular to Sterling Ridge and Cataloochee Divide. Two lower ridges, Noland Mountain and Big Fork Ridge, run parallel between Sterling and the Divide, forming the three valleys.

The northernmost of Cataloochee's three valleys is Little Cataloochee, which is situated along a stream of the same name between Sterling Ridge and Noland Mountain. Across Noland Mountain to the south is Big Cataloochee, the middle of the three valleys, which consists of fertile bottomland along Cataloochee Creek. The southernmost of the three valleys is Caldwell Fork, which is situated between Fork Ridge and the Cataloochee Divide. All three valleys lay along streams that are part of the Pigeon River watershed.

== History ==
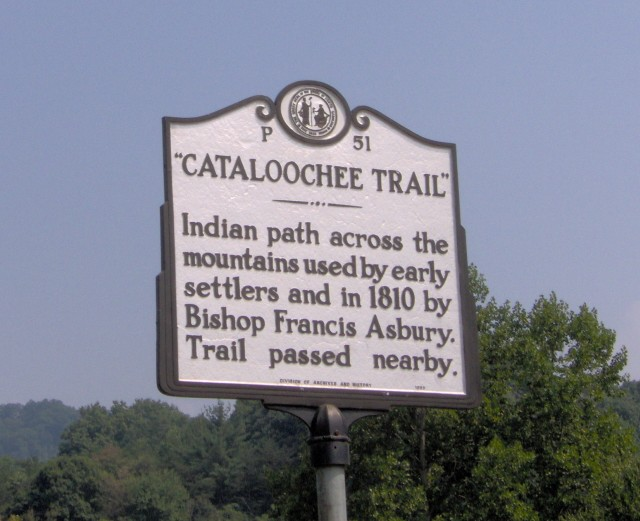
Historical marker recalling the Cataloochee Trail at the intersection of Jonathan Creek Rd. and Cove Creek Rd. near Maggie Valley

=== Cherokee territory ===
The name "Cataloochee" is derived from the Cherokee term Gadalutsi, which means "fringe standing erect." The name probably referred to the tall rows of trees along the ridges surrounding the valley. The Cherokee used the valley primarily as a hunting ground. Early settlers recalled at least one Cherokee hunting camp in the vicinity of Little Cataloochee Creek.

The Cataloochee Trail, which stretched from the Cove Creek area to what is now Cosby, Tennessee, connected the Cherokee Middlesettlements with the Overhill towns. The modern Cove Creek Road closely parallels this trail. By the time the first European explorers and traders arrived, the trail had been worn a foot deep in some places. Bishop Francis Asbury used it to cross the mountains into Tennessee in 1810.

The Cherokee gave up their claims to Cataloochee when they signed the Treaty of Holston in 1791. Nevertheless, they continued to hunt and fish in the valley throughout the 19th century. Hattie Caldwell Davis, a descendant of Cataloochee's first Euro-American settlers, recalled that her ancestors spoke "fluent Cherokee" and were always on friendly terms with the natives. Davis' great-grandfather, Levi, is believed to have provided aid to Cherokees hiding in the forest during the Trail of Tears period.

=== Early settlement ===
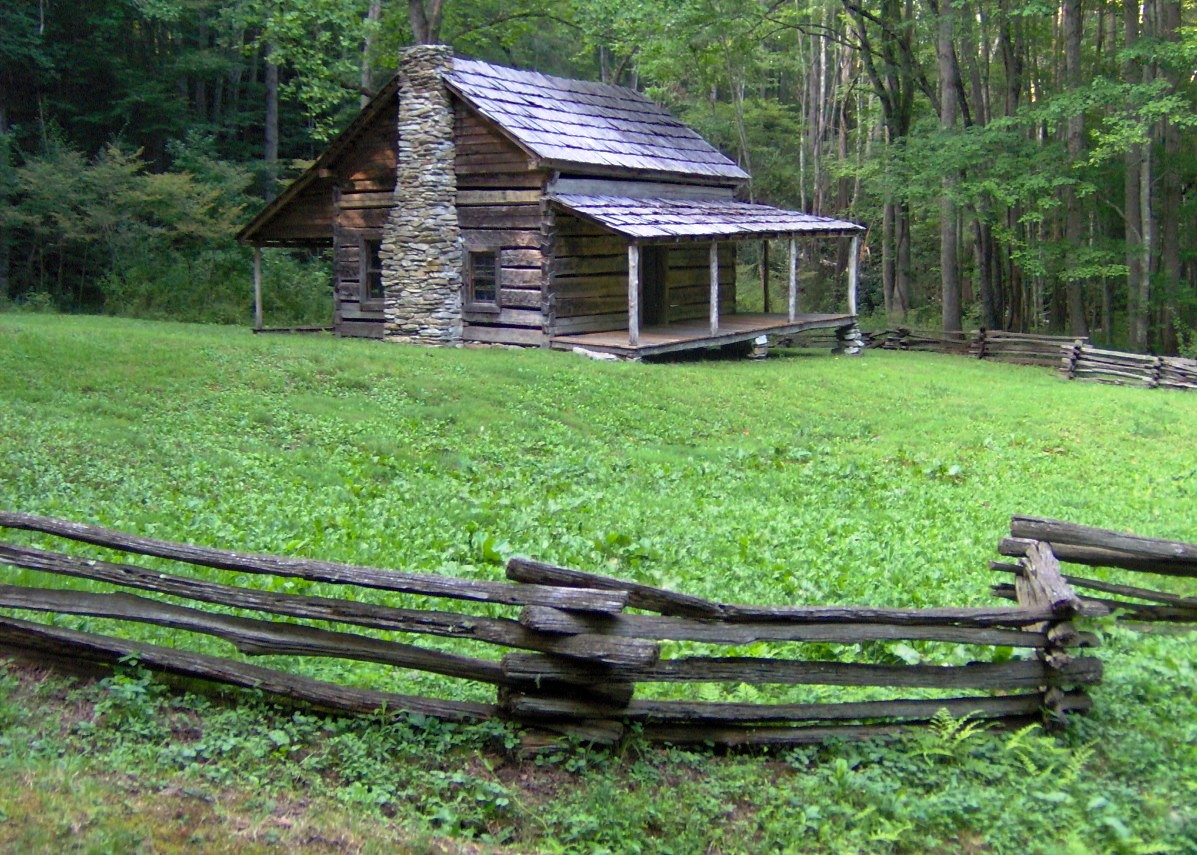
Cook Cabin in Little Cataloochee

Since the early 19th century, settlers were using the grassy balds along the ridges surrounding Cataloochee to raise livestock. Temporary herding camps were in place by 1814, when Henry Colwell made the first land purchase. In 1834, Henry's son, James Colwell (1797–1867) moved the family to Cataloochee. The spelling of "Colwell" was eventually changed to "Caldwell." The Caldwells were accompanied by the family of Young Bennett. Both families settled near the heart of Big Cataloochee, where their descendants would remain until the government forced them out in the 1930s.

George Palmer arrived in Cataloochee in 1838 and settled at the eastern end of Big Cataloochee. Family tradition recalls that Palmer had lost a fortune drinking and gambling in Waynesville and decided to move to Cataloochee to make a fresh start. Like the Caldwells and the Bennetts, the Palmers would remain in the valley until the arrival of the national park. A notable late arrival in Big Cataloochee was Jonathan Woody (1812–1894), who arrived shortly after the Civil War.

Caldwell Fork was probably named after John Caldwell, a grandson of the original settlers. John settled near the modern junction of the Caldwell Fork Trail and Big Fork Ridge Trail (the original road from Waynesville to Cataloochee passed through here), and a small community grew up around him. Prominent early settlers along Caldwell Fork include Sol Sutton, Elijah Messer (1844–1936), and Jesse McGee.

In 1854, Jack Vess, a son-in-law of George Palmer, and Daniel Cook (1831–1908) became the first permanent settlers in Little Cataloochee, which is opposite Noland Mountain to the north of the main settlement. Cook's daughter Rachel married Will Messer (1870–1946), a son of Elijah. Messer would eventually become Cataloochee's wealthiest man. Other notable early settlers in Little Cataloochee included William Noland and his son-in-law, Evan Hannah (1802–1878).

=== Pioneer life ===
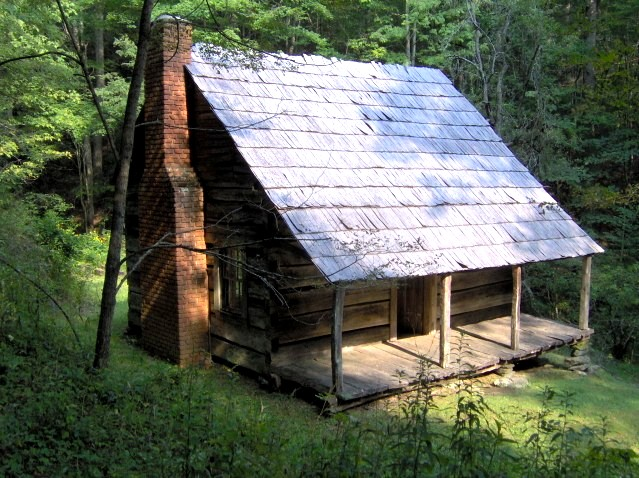
Hannah Cabin in Little Cataloochee, built in the mid-1800s

Along with the fertile bottomland in Cataloochee, the raising of livestock was the primary incentive that drew early settlers to the valley. The grassy balds were perfect summertime pastures for sheep and cattle, and hogs could roam and forage in the dense forests. Every year, Cataloochee's residents would drive their livestock and turkeys to markets in Waynesville or Charleston, South Carolina.

As game was plentiful in the valley, hunting and trapping provided supplemental income to Cataloochee's early residents. Furs were traded for powder, lead, salt, coffee, cloth, and indigo. A hunting camp was established where the Cataloochee Ranger Station now stands. In the late 19th century, George Palmer managed to get the state to place a bounty on wolves, which were consistently killing livestock in the valley.

Life on the Appalachian frontier was dangerous in a number of ways. While the early residents of Cataloochee were on friendly terms with the Cherokee, renegade Cherokee bands occasionally stole livestock. Wild animals such as bears and panthers often stalked the pioneers. Hattie Caldwell Davis wrote of an incident in the 1830s involving her great-grandmother, Mary Ann Caldwell, and Allie Bennett, both home alone one night cooking dinner while panthers roamed the valley:

...the panthers smelled the fresh pork cooking and they were hungry. They jumped on top of the log cabins scratching and tearing at the shingles. They were scratching and tearing at the chimney trying to tear away enough rocks to get down into the house. Each woman stayed in her own house and kept a big roaring fire in the fireplace to keep the panthers out.

By 1860, Cataloochee had a population of 160 and had been recognized as a township by the state of North Carolina. The Cataloochee Turnpike was completed in the early 1860s, following closely the old Cherokee trail. It was the first wagon road in the Smokies.

=== Civil War ===
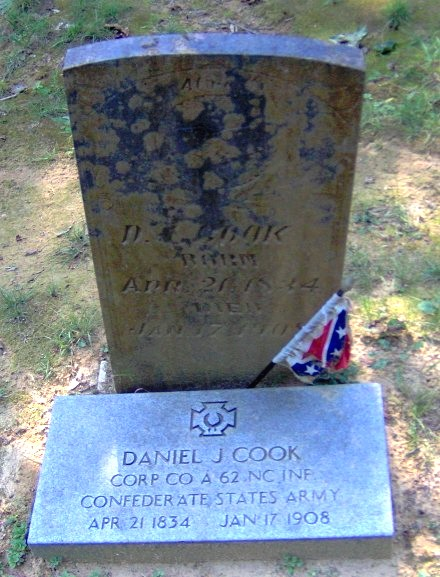
The grave of Confederate veteran Dan Cook in Little Cataloochee

Unlike much of southern Appalachia, Cataloochee was largely pro-Confederacy during the American Civil War. The sons of many prominent early settlers fought in the Confederate States Army, some of them losing their lives. The valley as a whole suffered extraordinary hardship as most able-bodied men left for the war effort, leaving many of the valley's fertile fields to lie fallow. Cataloochee was looted by raiders from both Union and Confederate forces, the former seeking Confederate sympathizers and the latter seeking draft dodgers.

Among the Union raiders was a band led by Colonel George W. Kirk, who policed numerous pro-Confederate settlements in western North Carolina. One notable incident involved a makeshift hospital the residents of Cataloochee had set up for veterans returning from the war. While on an excursion in the valley, Kirk's Raiders, the 3rd North Carolina Mounted Infantry, found this hospital and killed or wounded 15 patients recovering within.

Cataloochee's remote location made it an attractive hideout for deserters and Union sympathizers, and Confederate raiders regularly made excursions into the valley to root them out. One legendary incident occurred following a raid by Confederate Captain Albert Teague in which Teague captured Union sympathizers George and Henry Grooms and Mitchell Caldwell. Teague marched the three to a remote point along Sterling Ridge, and ordered Henry Grooms to play a tune on his fiddle. Grooms chose "Bonaparte's Retreat." After he finished, the three were executed.

The end of the Civil War brought some relief, although many of the returning men were too weak to plant the year's crops. The Confederate currency that the remaining residents had saved was worthless.

The arrival of the railroads gave the economy a small boost and helped western North Carolina recover from the war. When the first railroads were constructed in the 1870s, many of Cataloochee's residents had never seen a train. They sent Hiram Caldwell and Steve Woody out to Old Fort to observe the new trains and report back. Many refused to believe it when Caldwell and Woody told them they were unable to outrun the train on horseback.

=== 20th century ===
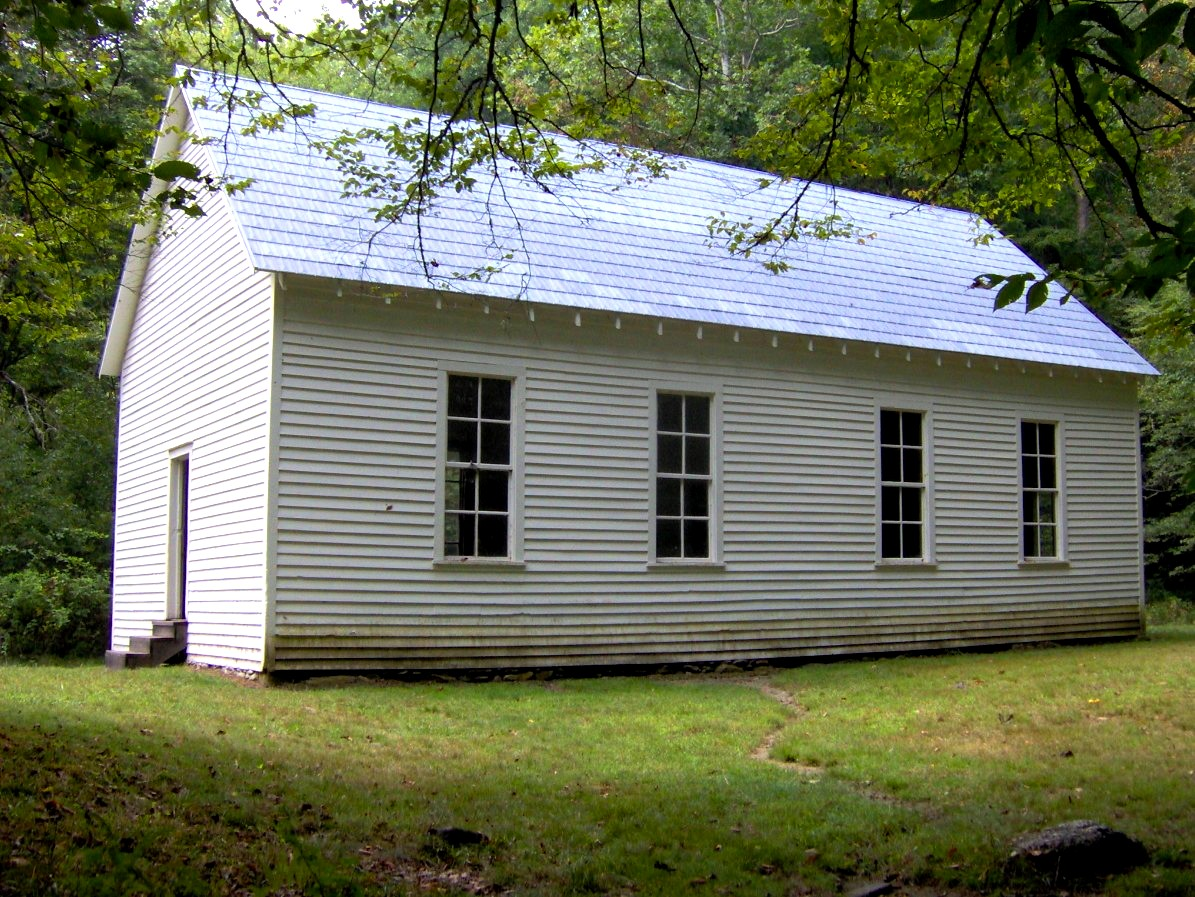
The Beech Grove School, built in 1907

By 1900, the population of Cataloochee had grown to 764. The Cataloochee school was too small to handle the growing population, and in 1906 the township sent a delegation consisting of Hiram and George Caldwell and Steve Woody to Waynesville to request a newer, larger school. Officials in Waynesville rejected them, however, claiming the citizen did not pay enough taxes. On the way home, the three decided to burn down the schoolhouse. After removing the furniture, they set the building ablaze and moved classes to the old Caldwell cabin. They then re-petitioned the government in Waynesville, claiming their school had burned down, and asked for a new one. Because of North Carolina's mandatory attendance laws, the government had no choice but to comply. Known as the Beech Grove School, the structure still stands today along Palmer Creek.

Apples were Cataloochee's main cash crop in the early 20th century, as the valley's relatively cool climate was perfect for apple trees. The foundation of a large communal applehouse built by Will Messer around 1910 can still be seen today near the Cook Cabin in Little Cataloochee. Messer's own applehouse is on display at the Mountain Farm Museum in Oconaluftee. By 1920, Cataloochee had two post office locations—one in Little Cataloochee known as Ola, after one of Will Messer's daughters, and another in Big Cataloochee known as Nellie, after one of George Palmer's daughters.

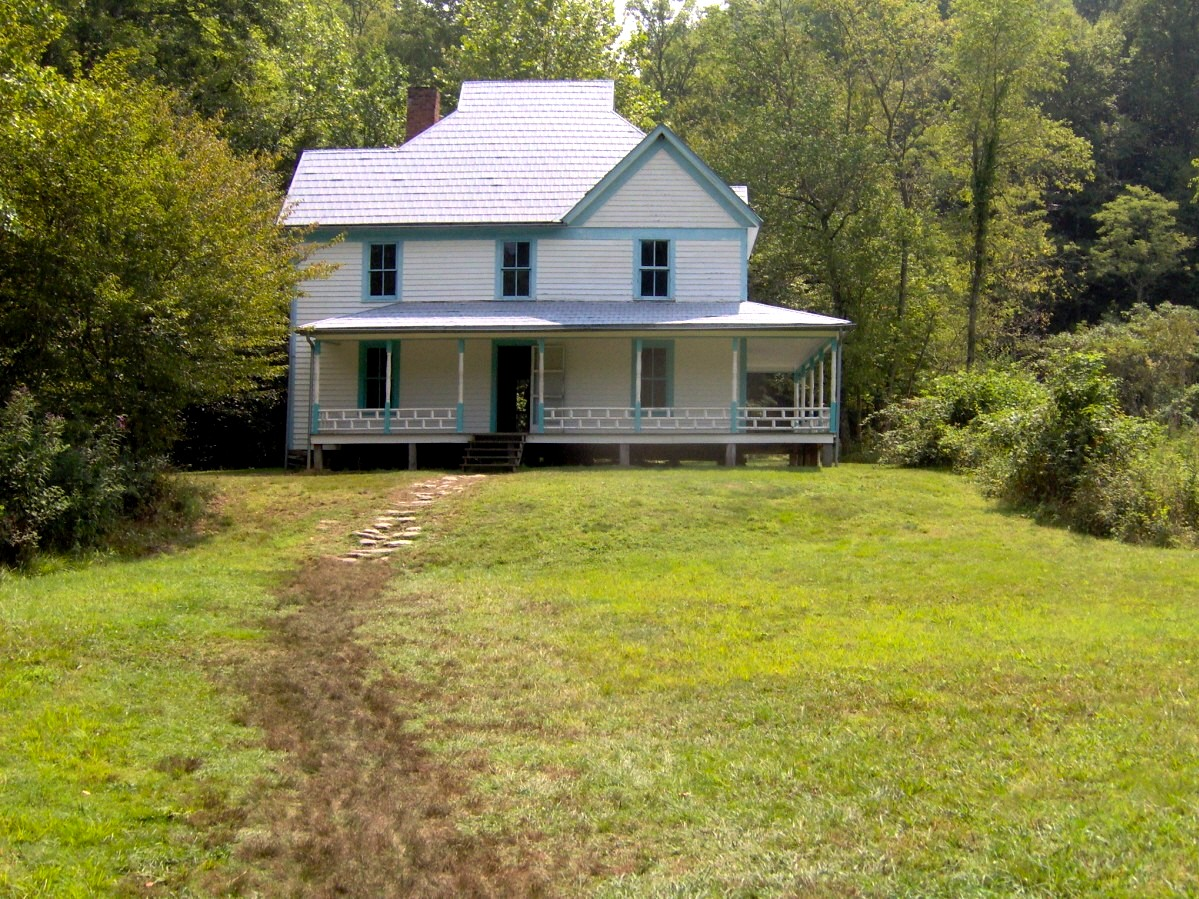
Caldwell House, built 1898-1903 by Hiram Caldwell

In Caldwell Fork, George Lafayette Palmer's reclusive son, "Boogerman" Robert Palmer, had settled in the heavy forest north of Elijah Messer's farm. Legend has it that on Palmer's first day of school, the teacher asked him what he wanted to be when he grew up. Palmer replied "the Boogerman." Palmer was protective of his forest; he rejected all buy-out offers from lumber companies and even barred his neighbors from cutting wood on his property. As a result, some of the tallest trees in the valley are found along the Boogerman Trail, which follows the old road connecting Big Cataloochee with the Caldwell Fork settlements.

In the early 20th century, moonshining was rampant throughout southern Appalachia, and Cataloochee was no exception. Some experts estimate that 95% of households in Cataloochee made their own whiskey, although most of this was for personal use. Early settlers used whiskey as a remedy for various ailments and to help them work long hours during the summer. During Prohibition, some of Cataloochee's poorer residents and small farmers supplemented their income by selling moonshine, which was in high demand. The liquor was sold at Waynesville and from there shipped as far away as New York City and Washington, D.C.

Cataloochee was largely spared the logging boom that deforested much of southern Appalachia in the early 20th century, although Suncrest Lumber and Parsons Pulp and Lumber had purchased most of the surrounding ridgeline with intent to cut it. Many residents of Cataloochee found employment at logging camps at Hartford, Crestmont, and Big Creek, all located along the Pigeon River to the north, and Walnut Bottom, located on the other side of Sterling Ridge. The arrival of the national park movement in the 1920s put an end to large-scale logging operations in the northeastern Smokies before they reached the Cataloochee lowlands.

=== National park ===
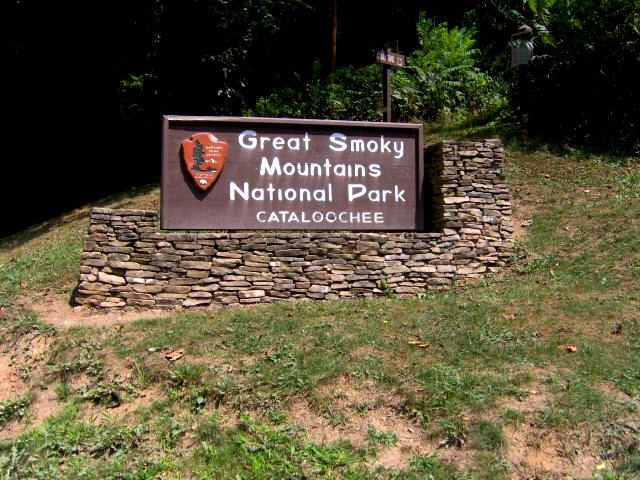
The eastern entrance to Cataloochee atop Cataloochee Divide

Tourists began trickling into the Smokies in the late 19th century, drawn by mineral-rich mountain springs that were thought to have health-restoring qualities. Many mountain residents built additional rooms onto their houses to accommodate lodgers, and several hotels sprang up. The Cataloochee Ranch was established in 1933 by Tom and Judy Alexander. The ranch was open April 15 through October 15, with 10 rooms at rates ranging from $2.75 to $5.00 per day. Jarvis Palmer operated an 8-person lodge and three cottages during the 1930s, with slightly lower rates.

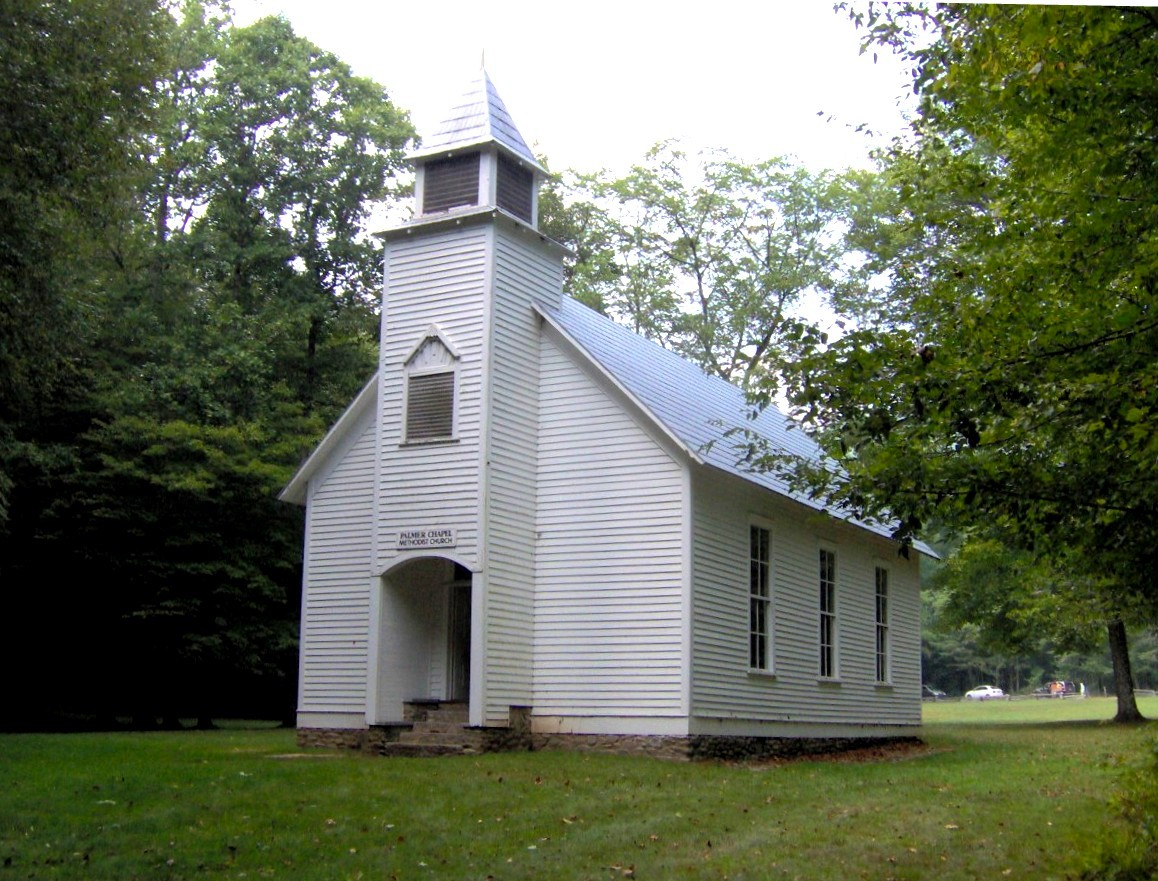
Palmer Chapel in Big Cataloochee, built in 1898.

In the 1920s, the increase in tourism and the destructive effects of logging gave rise to a movement to create a national park in the Smokies. For this to happen, the residents living in the proposed park boundaries would either have to sell their land or be forced out via eminent domain. In 1928, Reverend Pat Davis broke the news to the residents of Cataloochee at Palmer's Chapel, telling them the valley was within proposed park boundaries and that they would be forced to sell. Hattie Caldwell Davis, who was at the meeting, recalled women crying and men threatening to dynamite the roads and shoot anyone who tried to enter. Some men had the idea of blocking Cove Creek Gap so the government representatives would have to come in from the Tennessee side, where Mount Sterling residents would surely stop them.

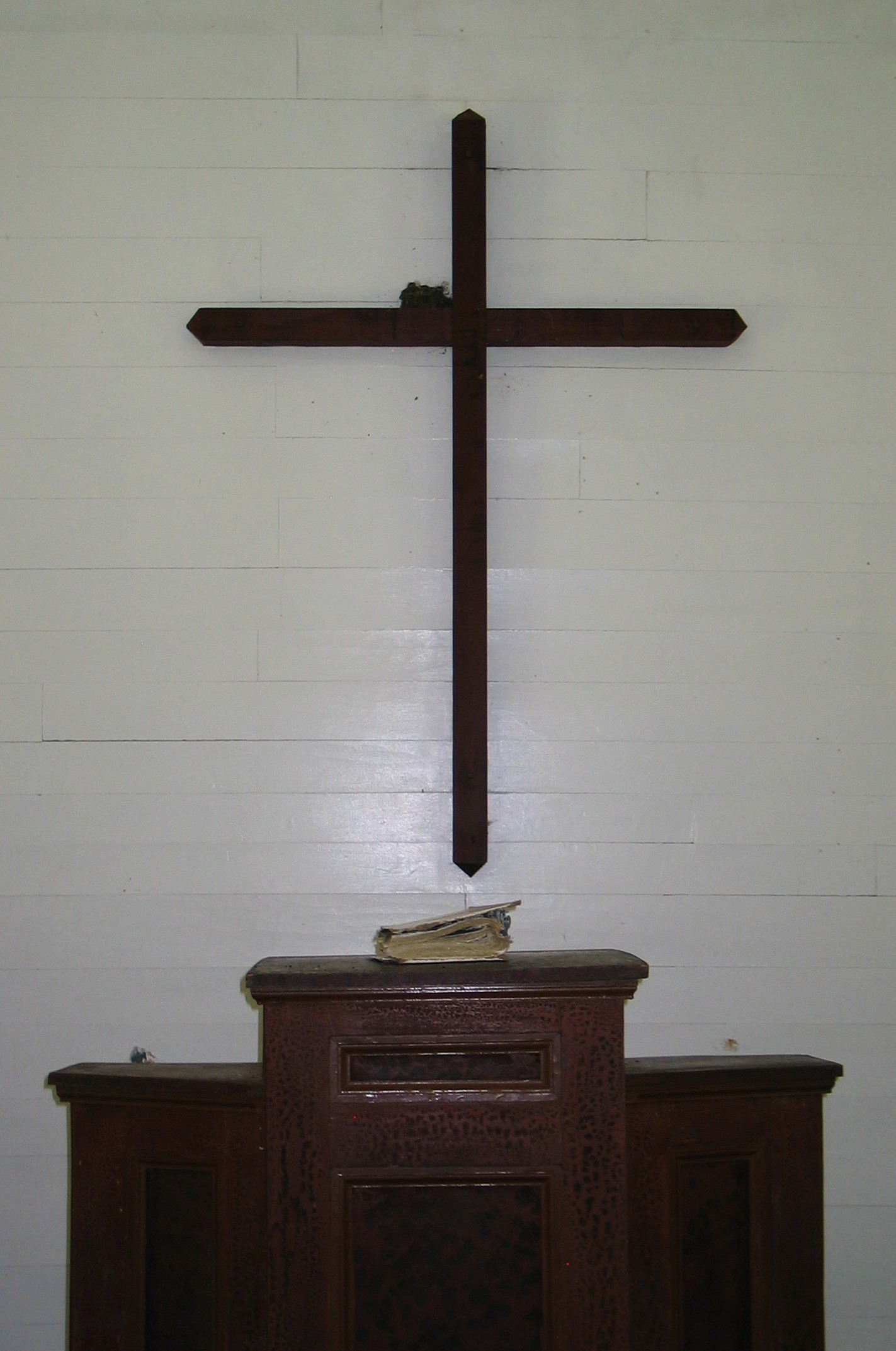
Pulpit and cross, with bird's nest, in Palmer Methodist Chapel, Big Cataloochee, North Carolina ("His eye is on the sparrow....")

Opposition to the park movement was eased when the Park Commission allowed residents to obtain lifetime leases and remain in their homes. While some contested their condemnation suits, most simply took what was offered, as they were skeptical of lawyers and did not think anything would be gained by going to court. Many chose to remain on lifetime leases, but restrictions on farming and logging would force most people out of Cataloochee by 1943. Most simply moved elsewhere in Haywood County.

In the 1970s, the Park Service made plans to develop Cataloochee as a major tourist area within the park by paving Cove Creek Road and allowing greater vehicle access. Widespread opposition and threats of litigation stalled the plan until 1982, when budget cuts forced the Park Service to abandon it. As of 2007, Cataloochee's surviving former residents and their descendants were still holding reunions in August of each year.

== Description ==
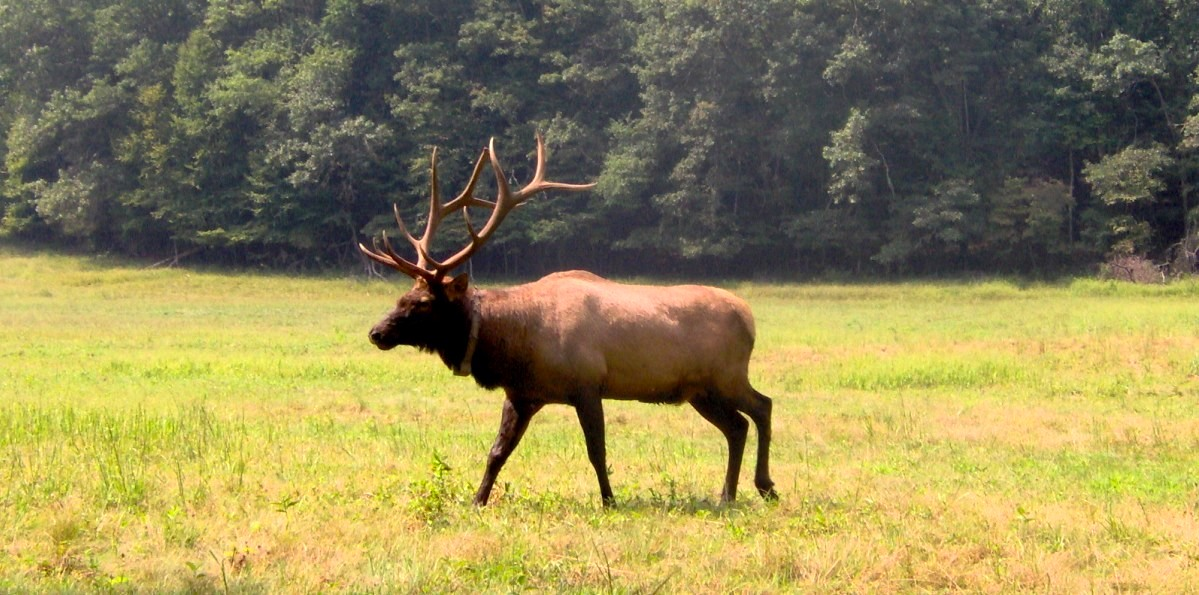
Elk grazing in Big Cataloochee

Compared to other driving destinations within the park, Cataloochee remains relatively remote. While a well-maintained paved road traverses Big Cataloochee, the valley is connected to the outside world by the crude gravel Cove Creek Road, which is riddled with sharp turns as it crosses Cataloochee Divide and Sterling Ridge. Cove Creek Road is accessible from Jonathan Creek Road (I-40, Exit 20) or from the Big Creek area near Waterville.

Cataloochee Campground lies at the junction of Caldwell Fork and Cataloochee Creek. Backcountry campsites are located along the Caldwell Fork Trail, Rough Creek Trail, and Pretty Hollow Gap Trail.

In 2001, the Appalachian Highlands Science Learning Center was established at Purchase Knob (atop Cataloochee Divide) on land donated to the park by Kathryn McNeil and Voit Gilmore the previous year. The purpose of the center, part of a network of 32 such research centers throughout the national park system, is to facilitate scientific research in the Appalachian highlands and increase public awareness and understanding of this research. The center, located along the Cataloochee Divide Trail, includes laboratories and housing for visiting scientists.

=== Elk population ===
Elk were reintroduced into the park in February 2001 when 25 elk from the Land Between the Lakes National Recreation Area were released in Cataloochee. Most of the original $1.1 million cost was funded by the Rocky Mountain Elk Foundation, which provided $700,000. Elk once roamed the highlands of southern Appalachia but were extirpated by overhunting and loss of habitat. Elk herds are a common sight in Cataloochee in the spring and fall. By 2021, the elk population was estimated to be around 200.

=== Historical structures ===
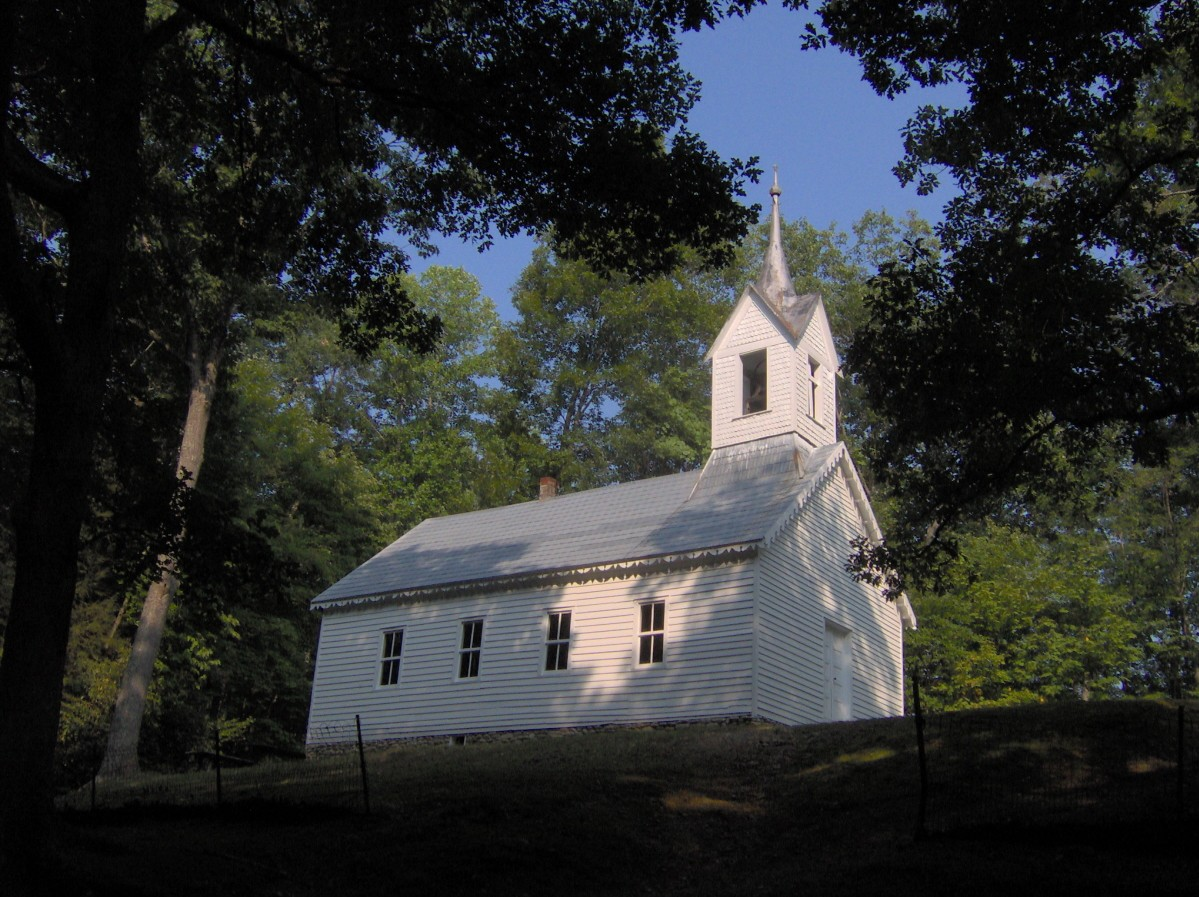
Little Cataloochee (Ola) Baptist Church in Little Cataloochee, built in 1889

For anthropological and historical purposes, the National Park Service has preserved several structures dating to Cataloochee's pre-park days. Unlike other historical areas of the park such as Cades Cove and the Mountain Farm Museum at Oconaluftee, many of the structures in Cataloochee have a more modern look and are more representative of life in the early 20th century as opposed to pioneer life in Appalachia. Notable exceptions are the Cook Cabin and Hannah Cabin.

The Hannah Cabin in Little Cataloochee was built by John Jackson Hannah, the son of Little Cataloochee pioneer Evan Hannah. The cabin's chimney is one of only three surviving brick chimneys in the national park.

The Cook Cabin in Little Cataloochee was built by Dan Cook in the 1850s. It was dismantled in the 1970s after being vandalized, and restored to its original site in 1999. The ruins of Cook's applehouse (built by Cook's son-in-law Will Messer) are on the opposite side of the trail.

The Palmer House in Big Cataloochee was built in 1869 by George Lafayette Palmer. Originally a log cabin, a framed addition and weatherboarding were added later by Palmer's son, Jarvis. Along with the house, the site includes the Palmers' frame springhouse, smokehouse, and barn. The house now contains a self-guided museum.

The Palmer Chapel in Big Cataloochee was built in 1898 on land deeded by Mary Ann Palmer.

The Caldwell House in Big Cataloochee was built 1898-1903 by Hiram Caldwell. The Caldwell Barn, adjacent to the house, was built in 1923.

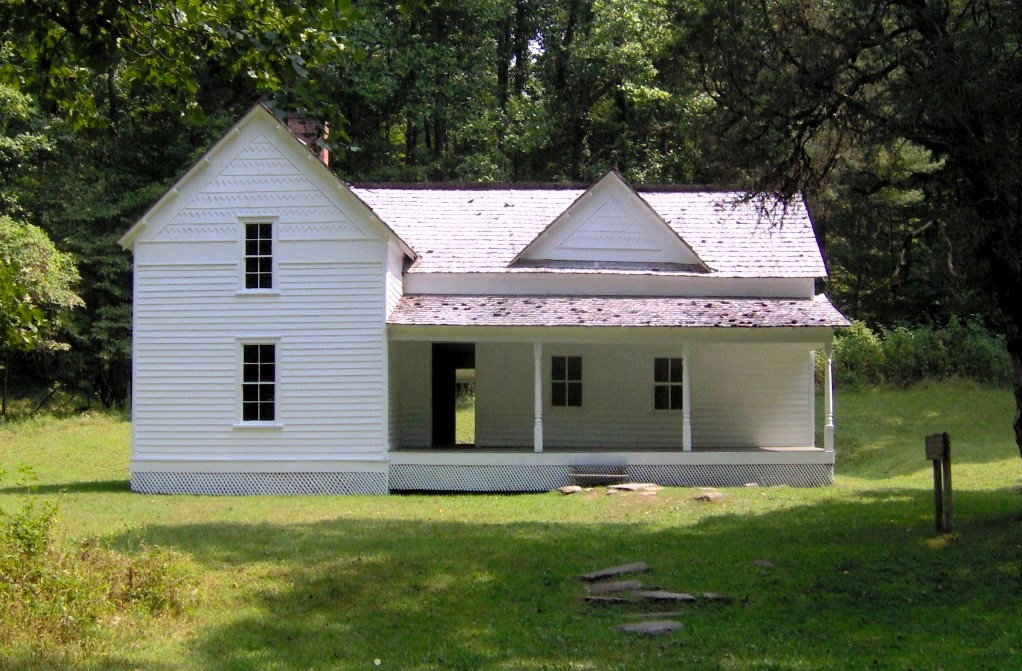
Steve Woody House, built 1880.

The Steve Woody House in Big Cataloochee was built in 1880 by Steve Woody, the son of Jonathan Woody. The house was originally built of logs. Later, paneling and extra rooms were added as lumber from sawmills became widely available. The house is located along the Rough Fork Trail, a mile from the road. Woody's springhouse is nearby.

The Little Cataloochee Baptist Church (sometimes called Ola Baptist Church) in Little Cataloochee was built in 1889. Will Messer later built the belfry, which included a bell donated by William Hannah.

The Messer Barn was built by Will Messer around 1905, and was originally located in Little Cataloochee. It was later moved to the ranger's residence, where it stands today. Messer's applehouse is now located at the Mountain Farm Museum in Oconaluftee. Will's cousin, John Messer, built the Messer Barn that now stands in Greenbrier, on the Tennessee side of the mountains.

Along with these intact structures, a number of rock walls, chimney falls, and cemeteries remain in the Caldwell Fork, Big Cataloochee, and Little Cataloochee valleys.
