= Cataloochee Ski Area =

Ski area in North Carolina, United States

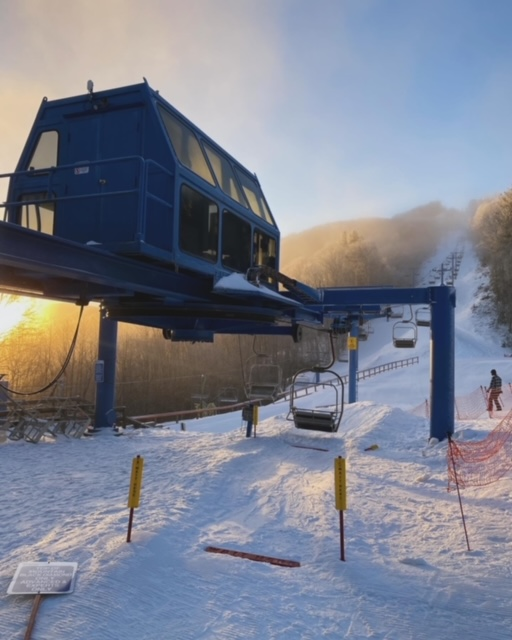
- Cataloochee in January 2024

- Location in the North Carolina, United States
- Location: Haywood County, North Carolina, U.S.
- Nearest city: Maggie Valley
- Coordinates: 35.563°N 83.090°W
- Opened: September 11, 1961
- Vertical: 740 feet (226 m)
- Top elevation: 5,400 feet (1,646 m)
- Base elevation: 4,660 feet (1,420 m)
- Trails: 18 total 44% beginner 39% intermediate 17% advanced
- Longest run: Upper & Lower Snowbird 1,900 feet (580 m)
- Lift system: 3 chairs, 2 conveyor lifts
- Terrain parks: 1
- Snowfall: 48 inches (120 cm)
- Snowmaking: Yes, 100% coverage
- Website: cataloochee.com

The Cataloochee Ski Area is a ski area in the eastern United States in southwestern North Carolina, near Maggie Valley. With eighteen ski slopes and trails, approximately 44% are rated beginner, 39% intermediate, and 17% advanced. Its top elevation is 5,400 feet (1,646 m) above sea level, yielding a vertical drop of 740 feet (226 m). The slopes are accessed by three chairlifts and two carpet lifts.

Typical of North Carolina ski areas, Cataloochee relies primarily on snowmaking for its slopes. Cataloochee is known for having one of the longest seasons in the southeast with an average ski season of 125 days.

== Maps ==
- Trail Map.
