= George R. Stewart Peak =

Mountain in the state of California

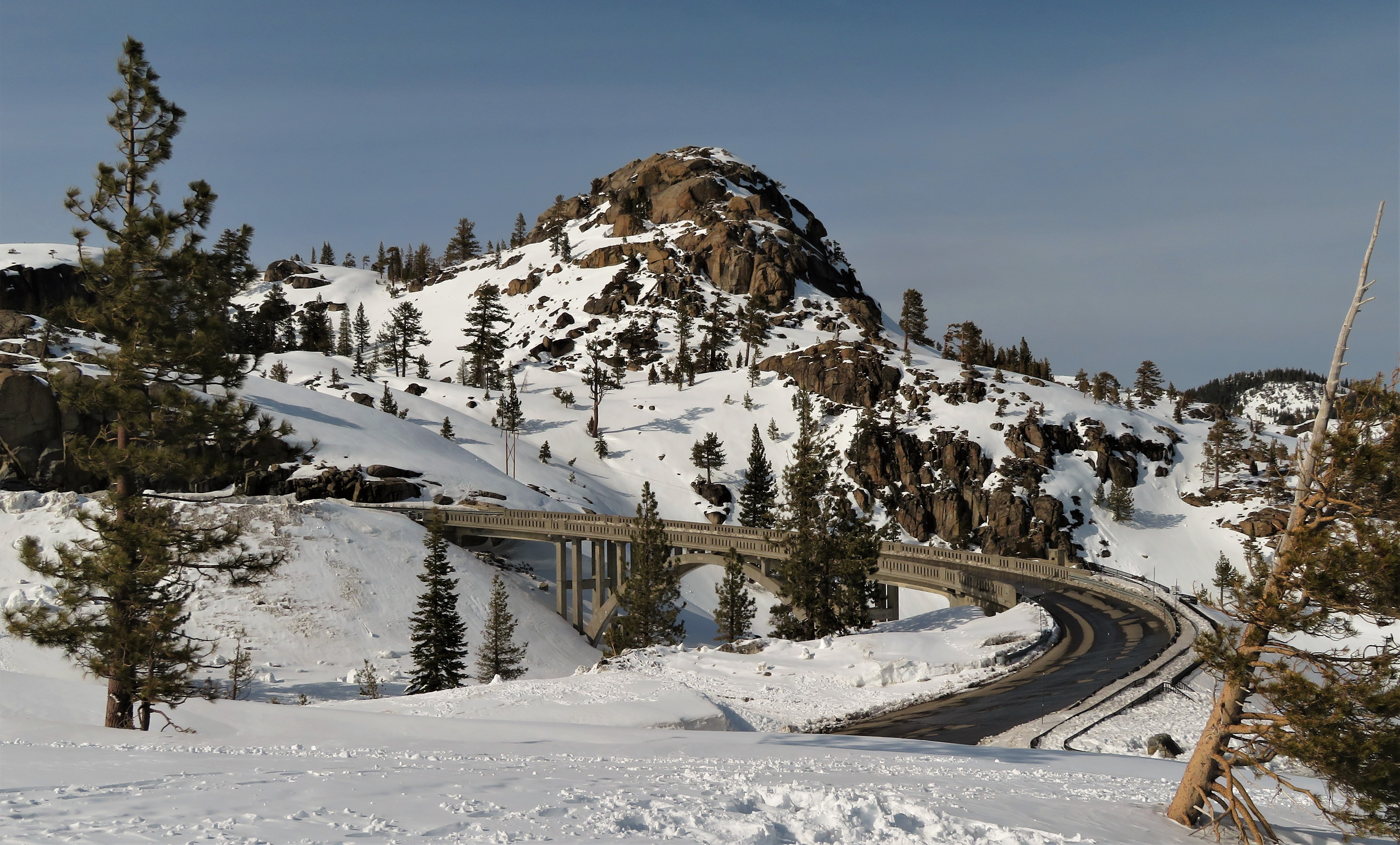
- South aspect of George R. Stewart Peak seen from McGlashan Point with Donner Summit Bridge

Highest point
- Elevation: 7,389 ft (2,252 m)
- Prominence: 149 ft (45 m)
- Parent peak: Boreal Ridge (7,701 ft)
- Isolation: 0.91 mi (1.46 km)
- Coordinates: 39°19′25″N 120°19′10″W

Naming
- Etymology: George R. Stewart

Geography
- Location within California Location within the United States
- Location: Donner Pass
- Country: United States of America
- State: California
- County: Nevada
- Parent range: Sierra Nevada
- Topo map: USGS Norden

Geology
- Rock age: Cretaceous
- Rock type: Granodiorite

Climbing
- Easiest route: Hiking

George R. Stewart Peak is a 7,389-foot-elevation (2,252-meter) summit in Nevada County, California, United States.

== Description ==
George R. Stewart Peak is located one-half mile northeast of Donner Pass, on land managed by Tahoe National Forest. It is situated in the Sierra Nevada mountain range, with precipitation runoff from the peak draining to Donner Lake. Neighbors include Donner Peak, one mile (1.6 km) to the south, and line parent Boreal Ridge, 1.4 miles (2.3 km) west. Topographic relief is modest as the summit rises 1,000 feet (300 meters) above Billy Mack Canyon in one mile, and 1,450 feet (440 meters) above Donner Lake in two miles. The Pacific Crest Trail traverses the peak, providing an approach from Donner Pass.

== History ==
This landform's toponym was officially adopted in October 1984 by the U.S. Board on Geographic Names to posthumously honor George R. Stewart (1895–1980), an American historian, toponymist, professor of English at the University of California, Berkeley for 56 years, and novelist who authored numerous books including a classic study of the ill-fated Donner Party. Stewart's old friend Wallace Stegner petitioned the board, writing: "A country which has wasted a lot of peaks on Secretaries of the Interior, Secretaries of War, Directors of the Naval Observatory and other Washington figures would ennoble itself by naming whatever peak is left after George R. Stewart, because his books may actually last, considering the way we chew up the environment, longer than the peaks themselves". This particular peak was named for him because the Sierra Nevada and the Donner Pass area both figured prominently in many of his novels, and the "full commemorative name" was given to avoid ambiguity and make the referent person unmistakable. Another reason this peak is appropriate for its namesake is because the historic U.S. Route 40, which was a major cross-country route, traverses the peak's eastern and southern slopes, and Stewart wrote books about US highways based on his cross-country drives of 1924, 1949 and 1950 when he drove past this peak which now bears his name.

George R. Stewart himself joked about the prospect of a mountain named for him in his 1945 book Names on the Land: "The use of the commoner surnames has already gone so far that we may even need to make use of the middle initial. Your author speaks with some personal application. There is already a Mount George Stewart in California, and he can expect nothing better than Mount George R. Stewart."

== Climate ==
According to the Köppen climate classification system, George R. Stewart Peak is located in an alpine climate zone. Most weather fronts originate in the Pacific Ocean and travel east toward the Sierra Nevada mountains. As fronts approach, they are forced upward by the peaks (orographic lift), causing them to drop their moisture in the form of rain or snowfall onto the range. Donner Pass averages 51.6 inches (1,310 mm) of precipitation per year, and with an average of 411.5 inches (10.45 m) of snow per year, it is one of the snowiest places in the contiguous United States. There are five ski areas at Donner Pass.

== Gallery ==
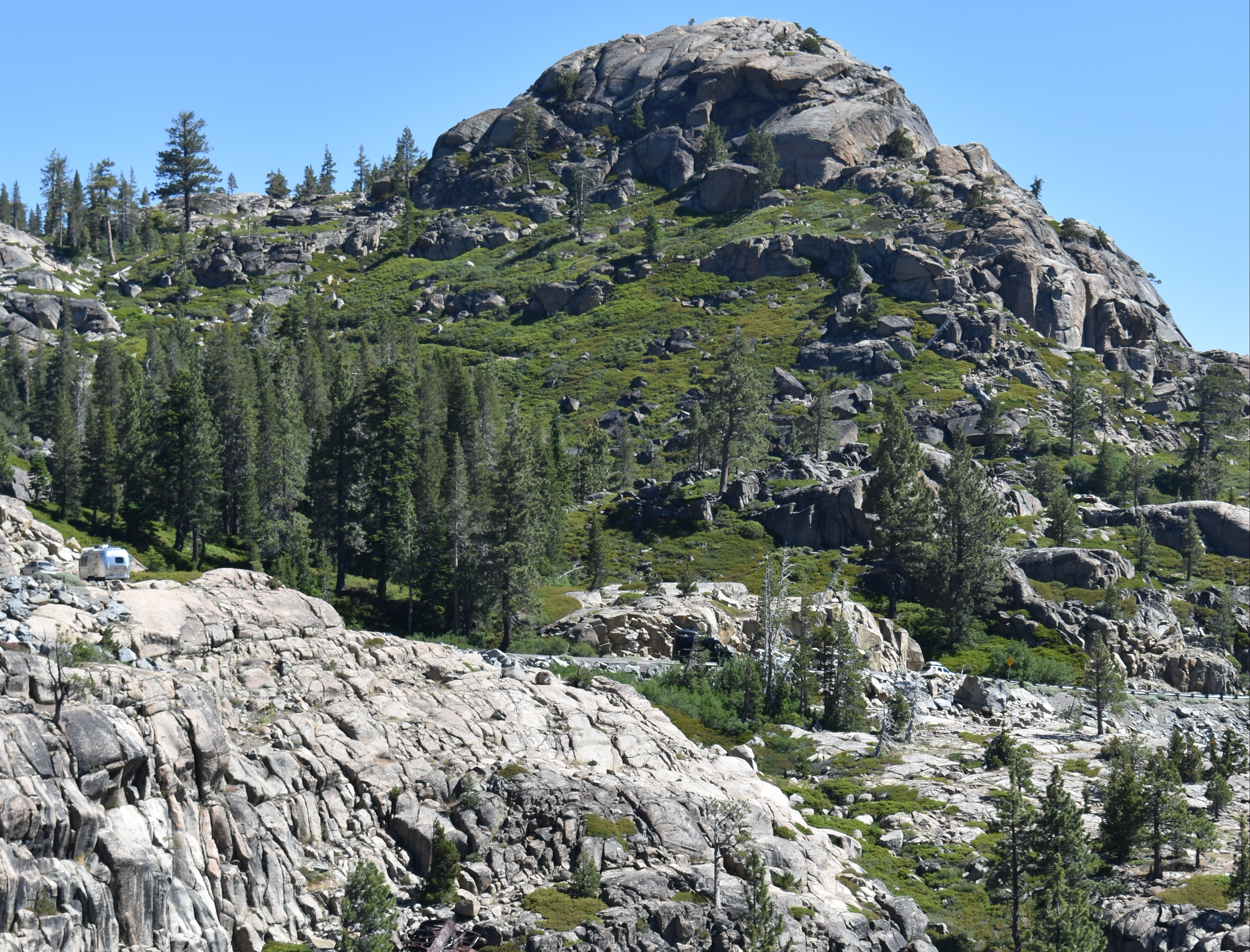

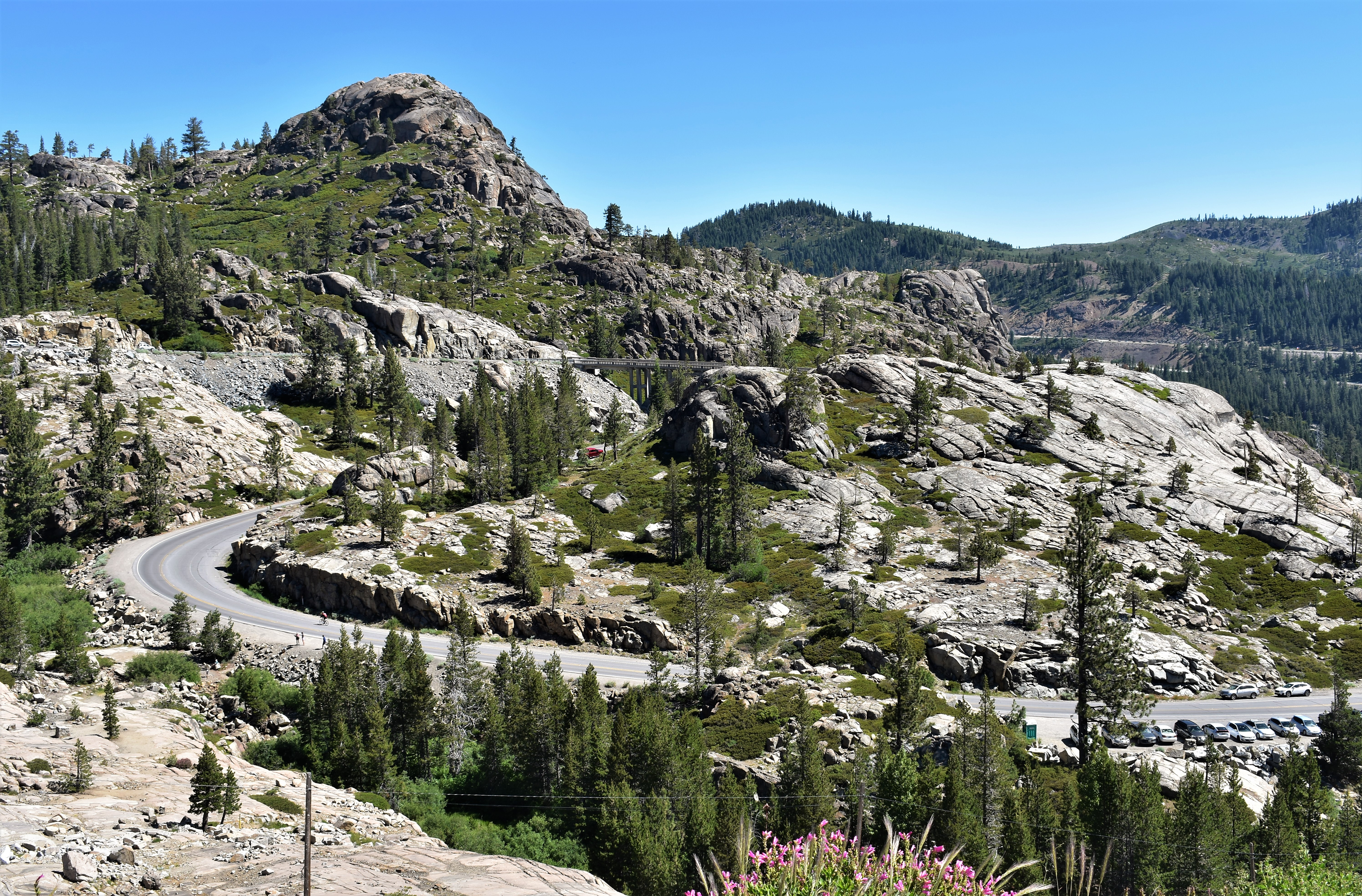
South aspect of George R. Stewart Peak

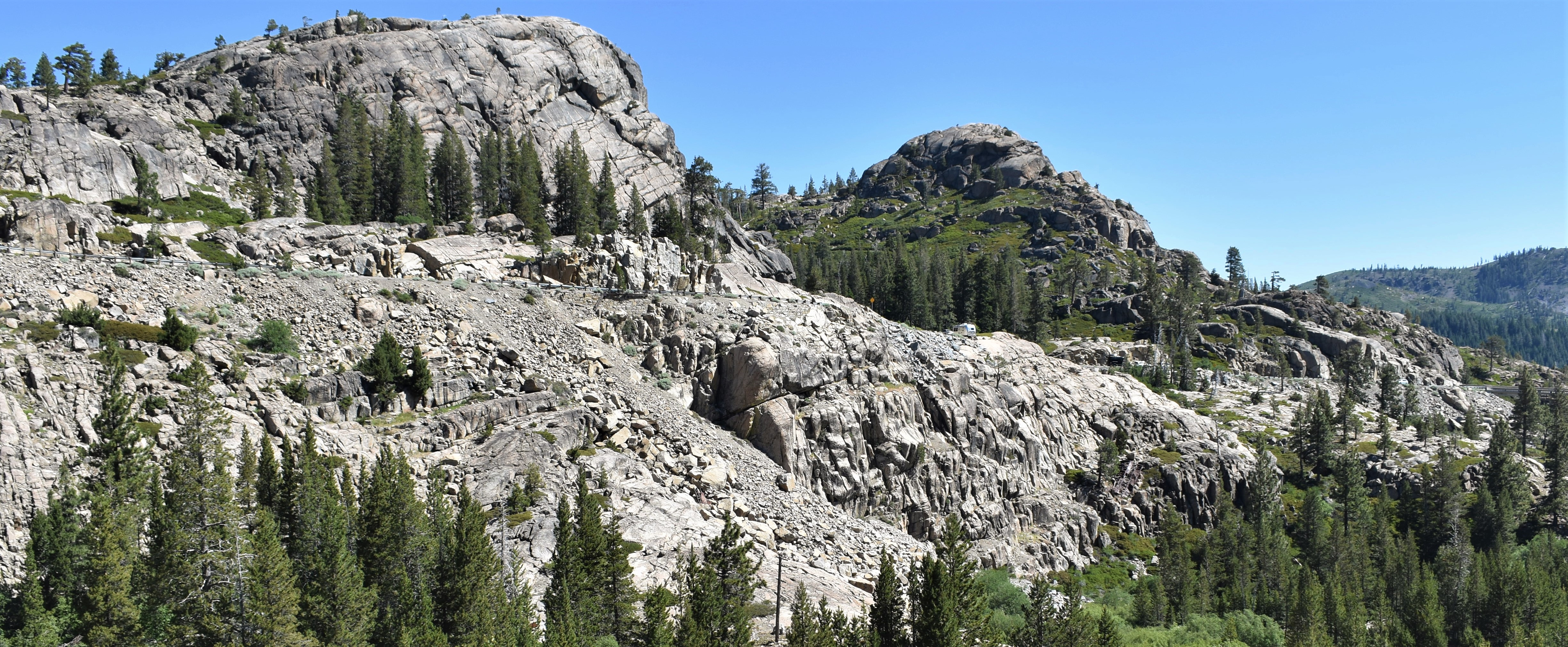
McGlashan Point (left) and George R. Stewart Peak (right)

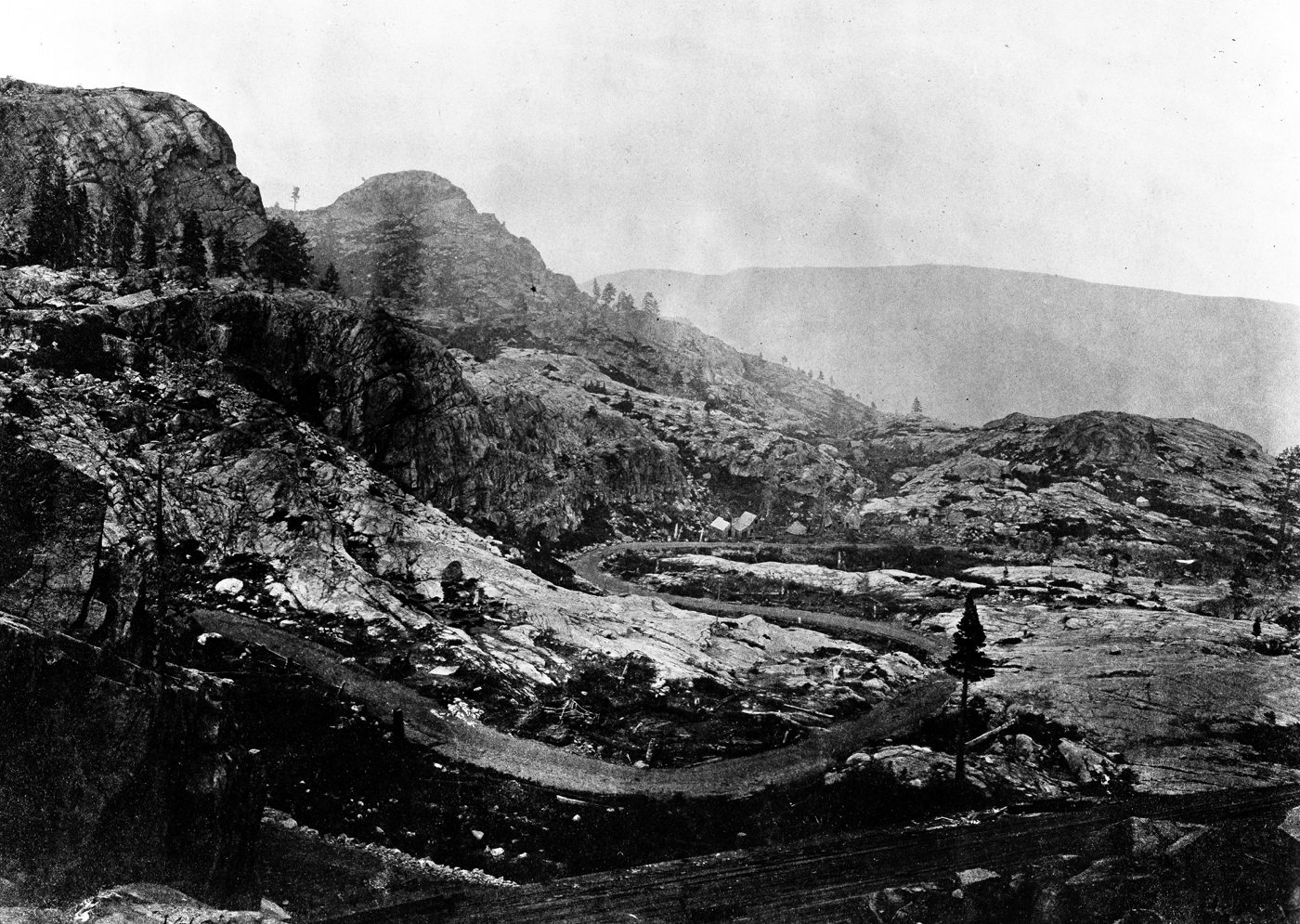
Historical image of George R. Stewart Peak from 1870s

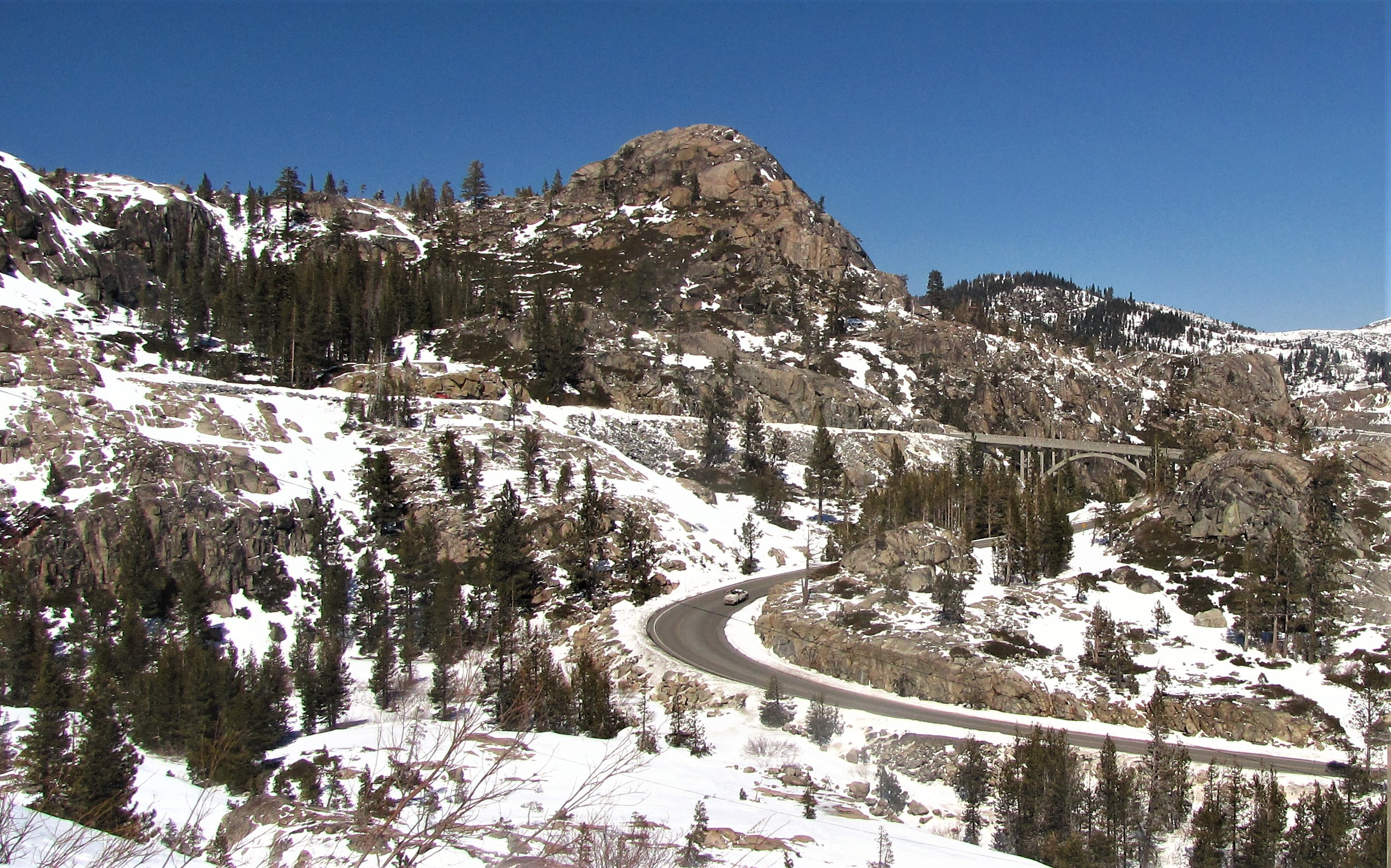
South aspect of George R. Stewart Peak

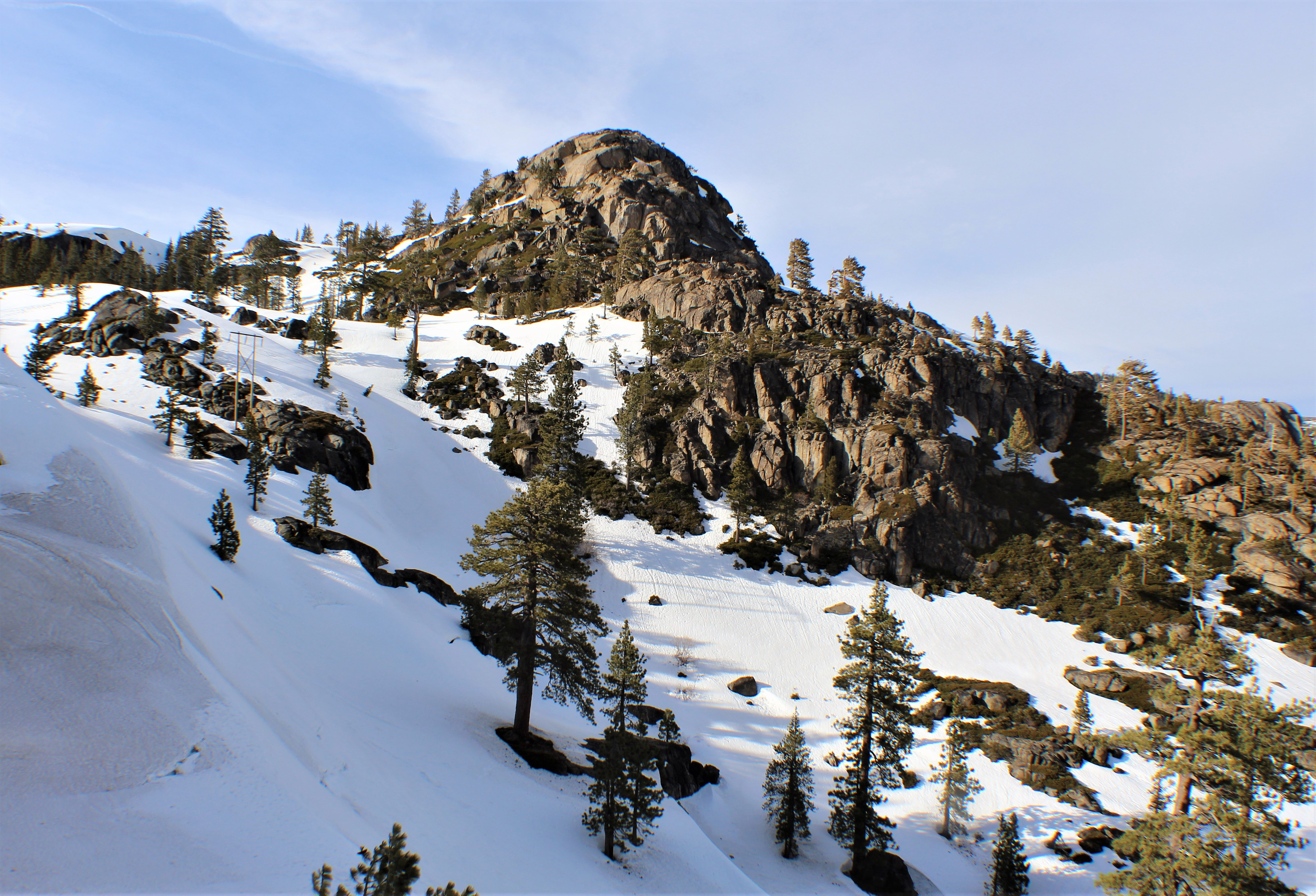

== See also ==
- Donner Pass
