= Donner Peak =

Mountain in the state of California

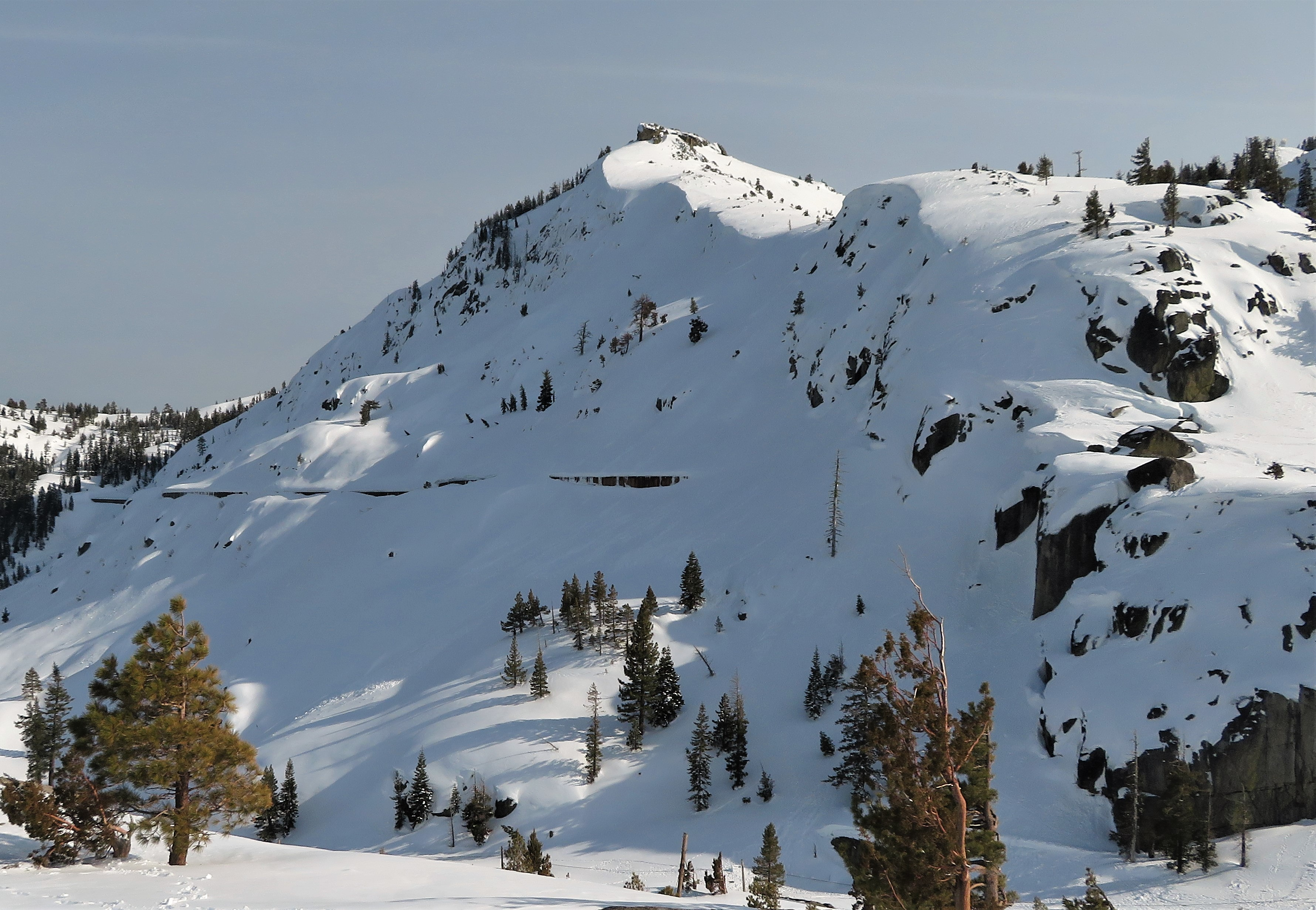
- Northwest aspect

Highest point
- Elevation: 8,019 ft (2,444 m)
- Prominence: 139 ft (42 m)
- Parent peak: Mount Judah (8,243 ft)
- Isolation: 0.73 mi (1.17 km)
- Coordinates: 39°18′31″N 120°18′45″W

Naming
- Etymology: Donner Party

Geography
- Location within California Location within the United States
- Location: Donner Pass
- Country: United States of America
- State: California
- County: Placer
- Parent range: Sierra Nevada
- Topo map: USGS Norden

Climbing
- Easiest route: class 1 hiking

Donner Peak is an 8,019-foot-elevation (2,444-meter) summit in Placer County, California, United States.

== Description ==
Donner Peak is located one mile southeast of Donner Pass, on land managed by Tahoe National Forest. It is situated in the Sierra Nevada mountain range, with precipitation runoff from the peak draining to Donner Lake. Topographic relief is modest as the summit rises 2,100 feet (640 meters) above Donner Lake in 1.5 mile. Neighbors include George R. Stewart Peak, one mile (1.6 km) to the north, and line parent Mount Judah, 0.73 miles (1.17 km) to the south. The Pacific Crest Trail traverses the west slope of the peak, providing an approach from Donner Pass. Round-trip hiking distance to summit is 3.5 miles (5.6 km) with 940 feet (290 m) of elevation gain.

== History ==
This landform's toponym was officially adopted in October 1940 by the U.S. Board on Geographic Names, having appeared on an 1873 topographic map made by California Geological Survey. The mountain was also called "Donner Peak" during 1865 construction of the route for the Central Pacific Railroad. The railroad originally traversed the steep north cliffs of the peak via tunnels and snow sheds before the 10,322-foot-long (3,146 m) Tunnel #41 running under Mount Judah and Donner Peak was opened in 1925. The peak, pass, and lake are named for the ill-fated Donner Party who spent the winter of 1846–1847 snowbound at the east end of Donner Lake.

== Climate ==
According to the Köppen climate classification system, Donner Peak is located in an alpine climate zone. Most weather fronts originate in the Pacific Ocean and travel east toward the Sierra Nevada mountains. As fronts approach, they are forced upward by the peaks (orographic lift), causing them to drop their moisture in the form of rain or snowfall onto the range. Donner Pass averages 51.6 inches (1,310 mm) of precipitation per year, and with an average of 411.5 inches (10.45 m) of snow per year, it is one of the snowiest places in the contiguous United States. There are five ski areas at Donner Pass.

== Gallery ==
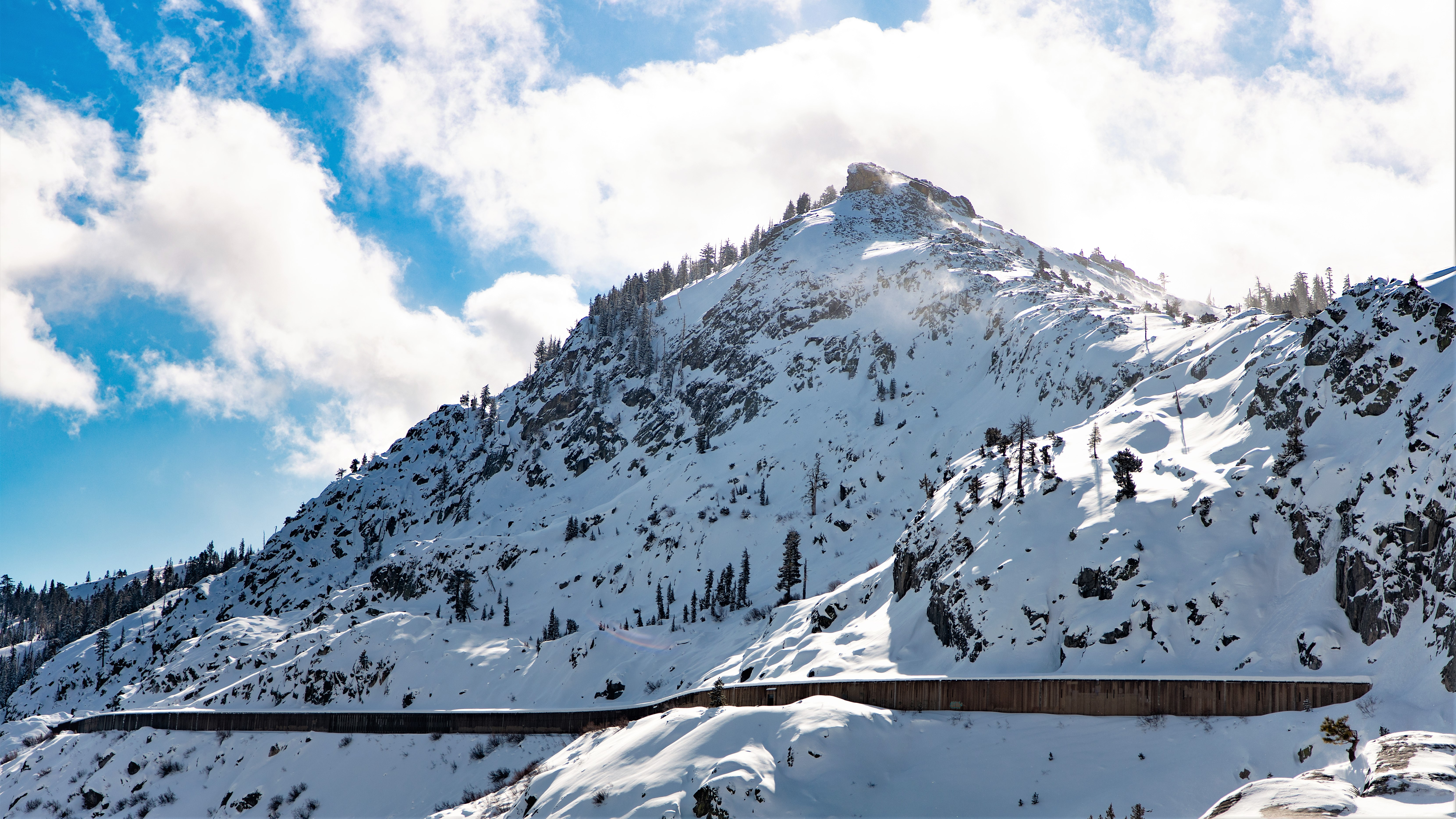
North aspect of Donner Peak with railroad snowshed.

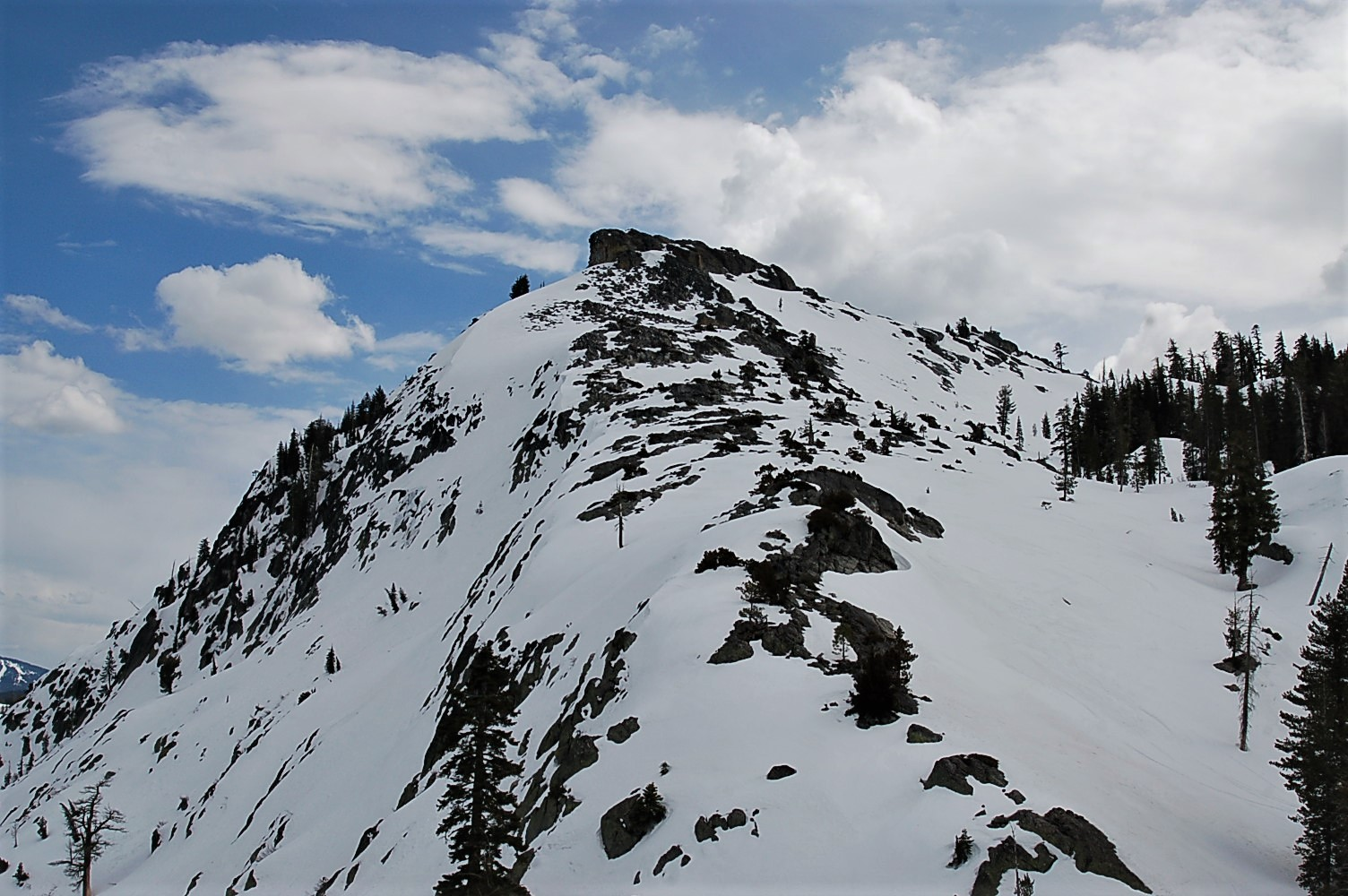
Summit of Donner Peak, from northwest

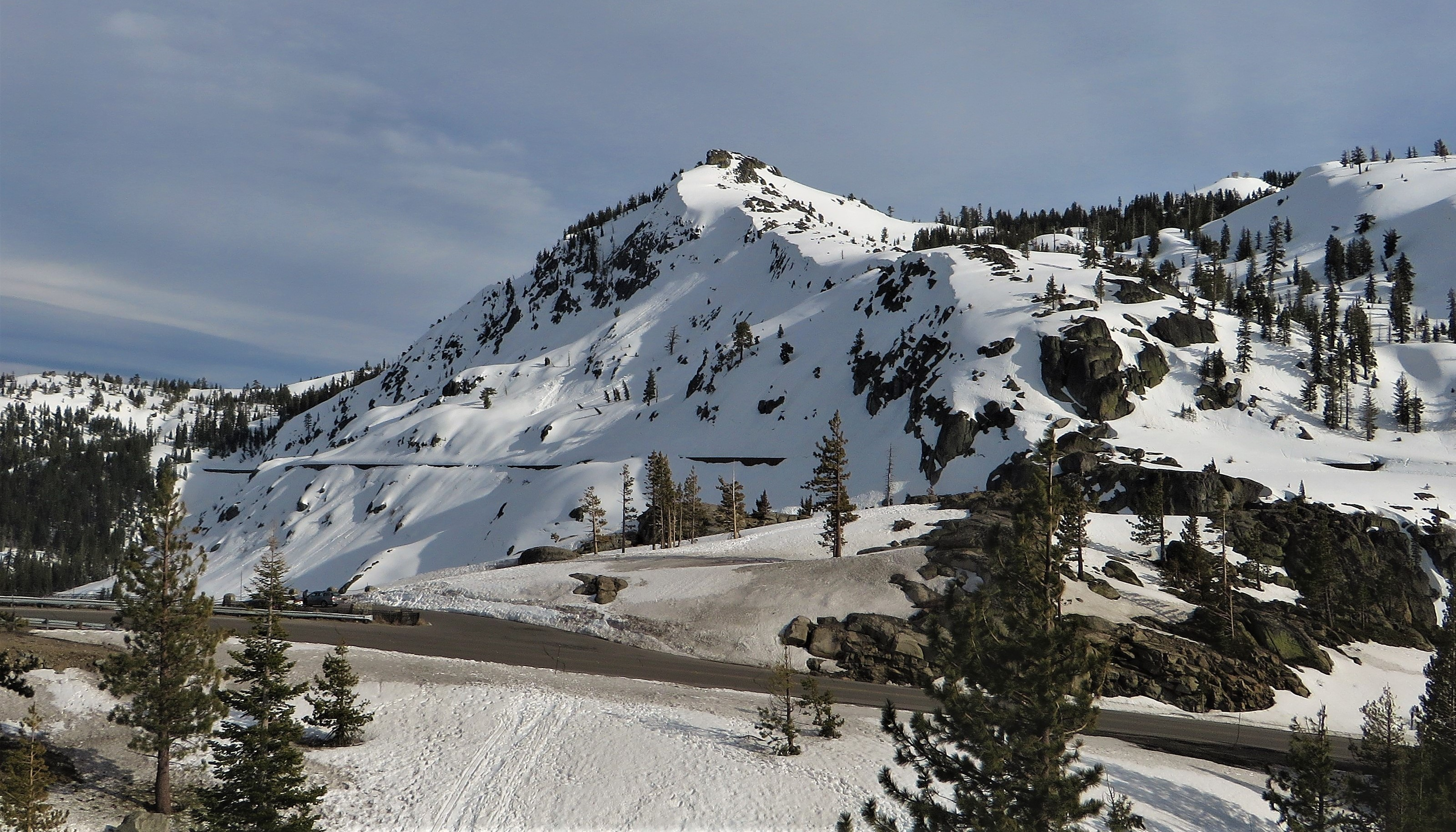
Donner Peak seen from McGlashan Point

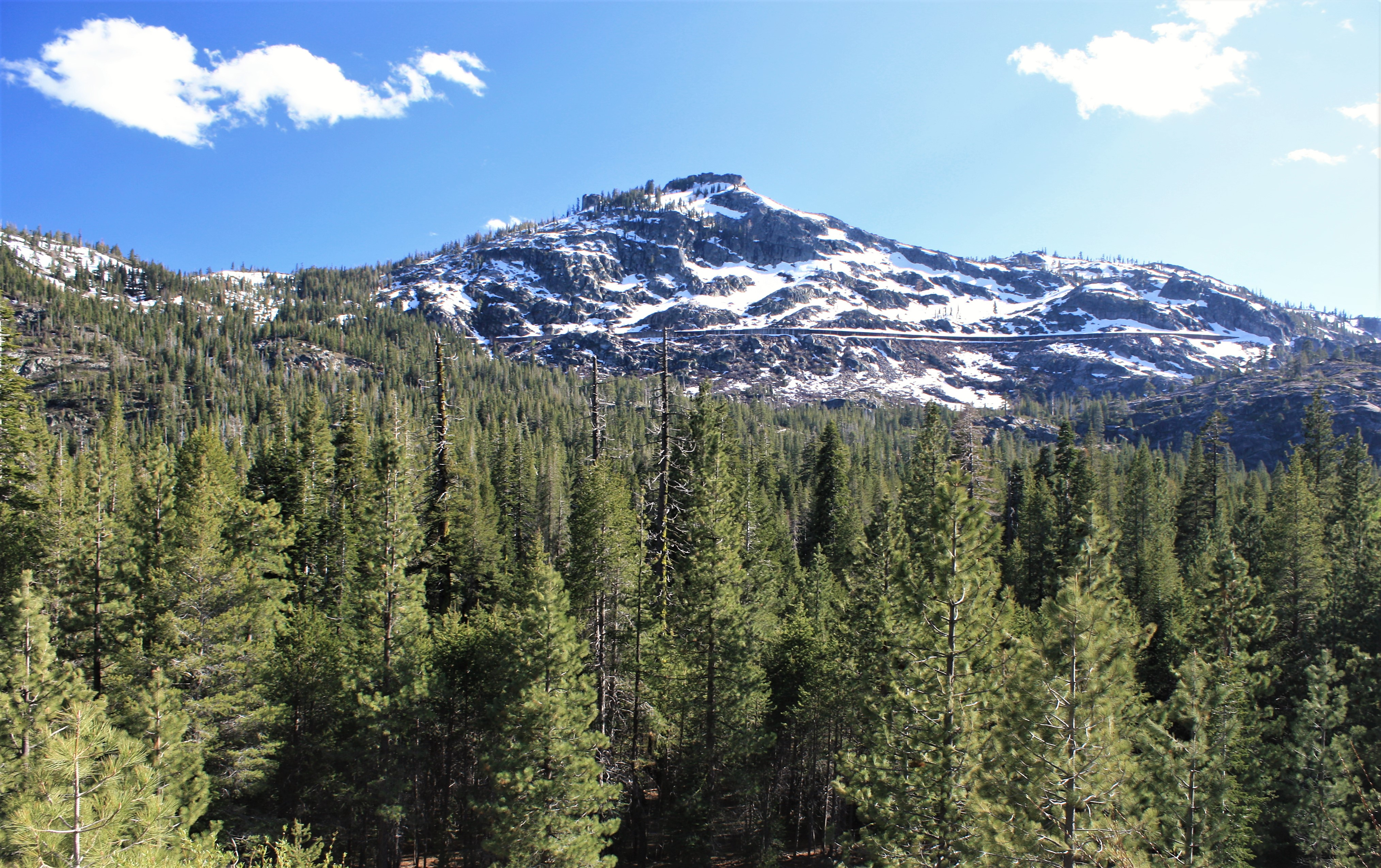
North aspect

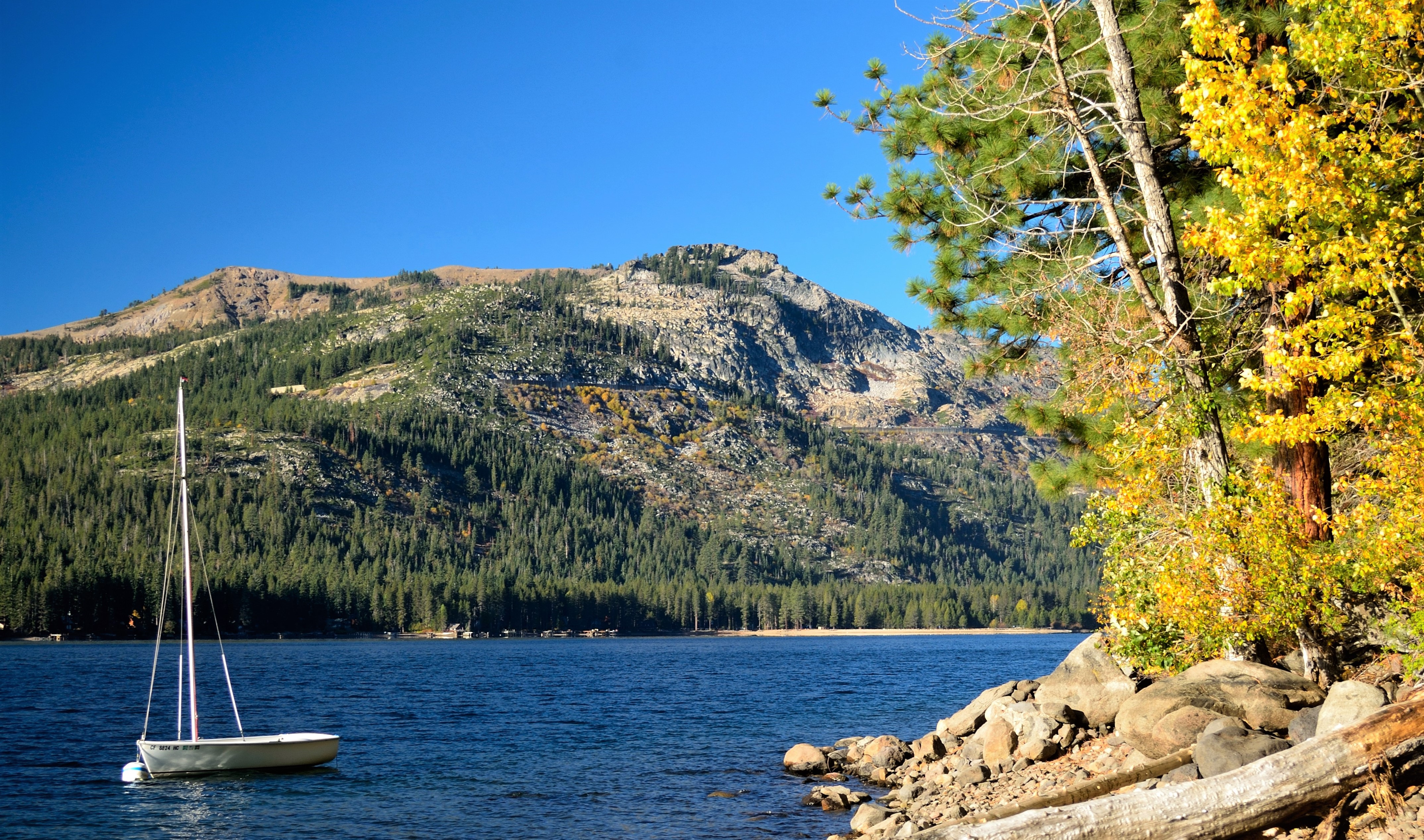
Donner Peak (centered) seen from Donner Lake, with parent Mount Judah partially visible behind, left.

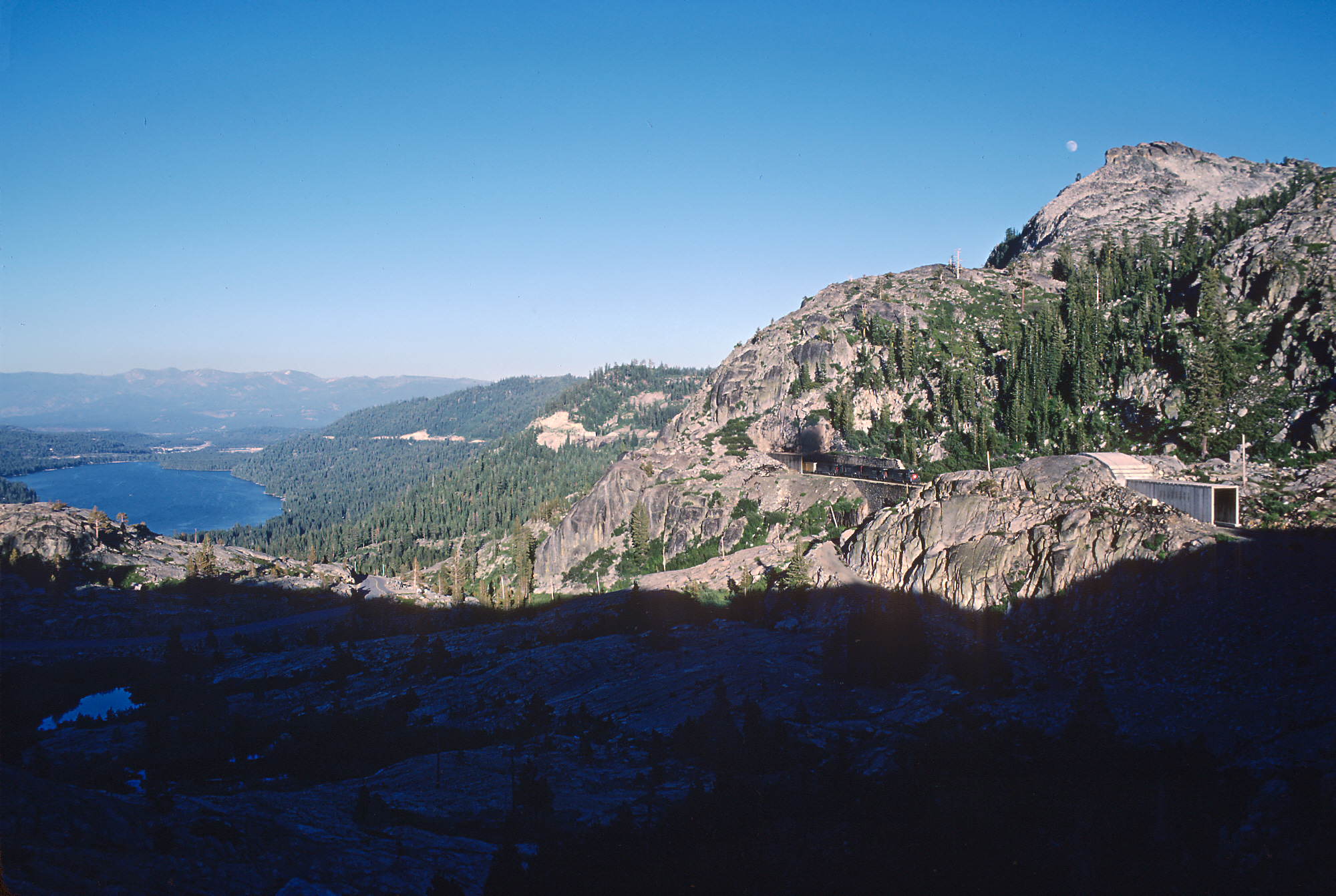
Donner Lake (left) and Donner Peak (right)

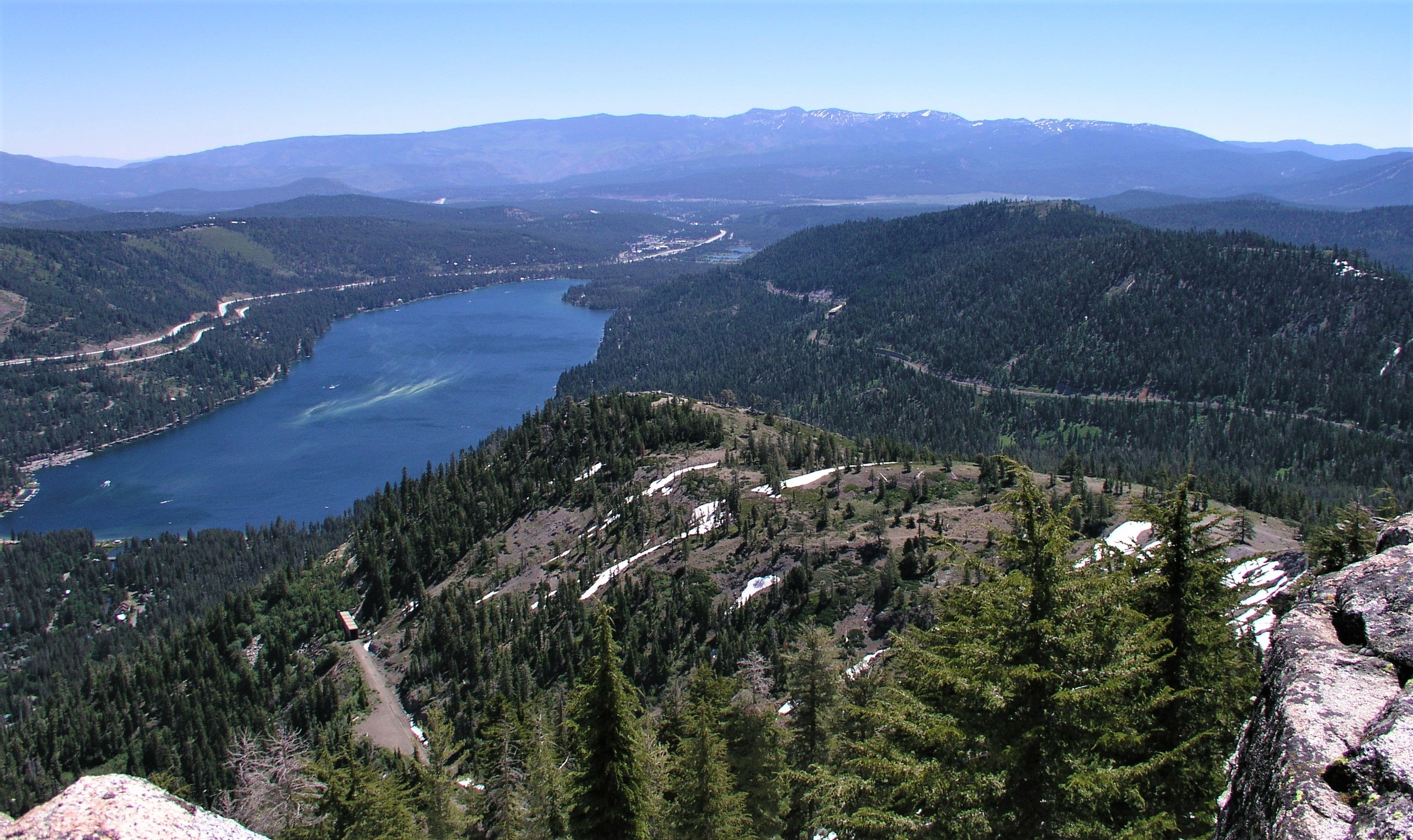
The view of Donner Lake from Donner Peak

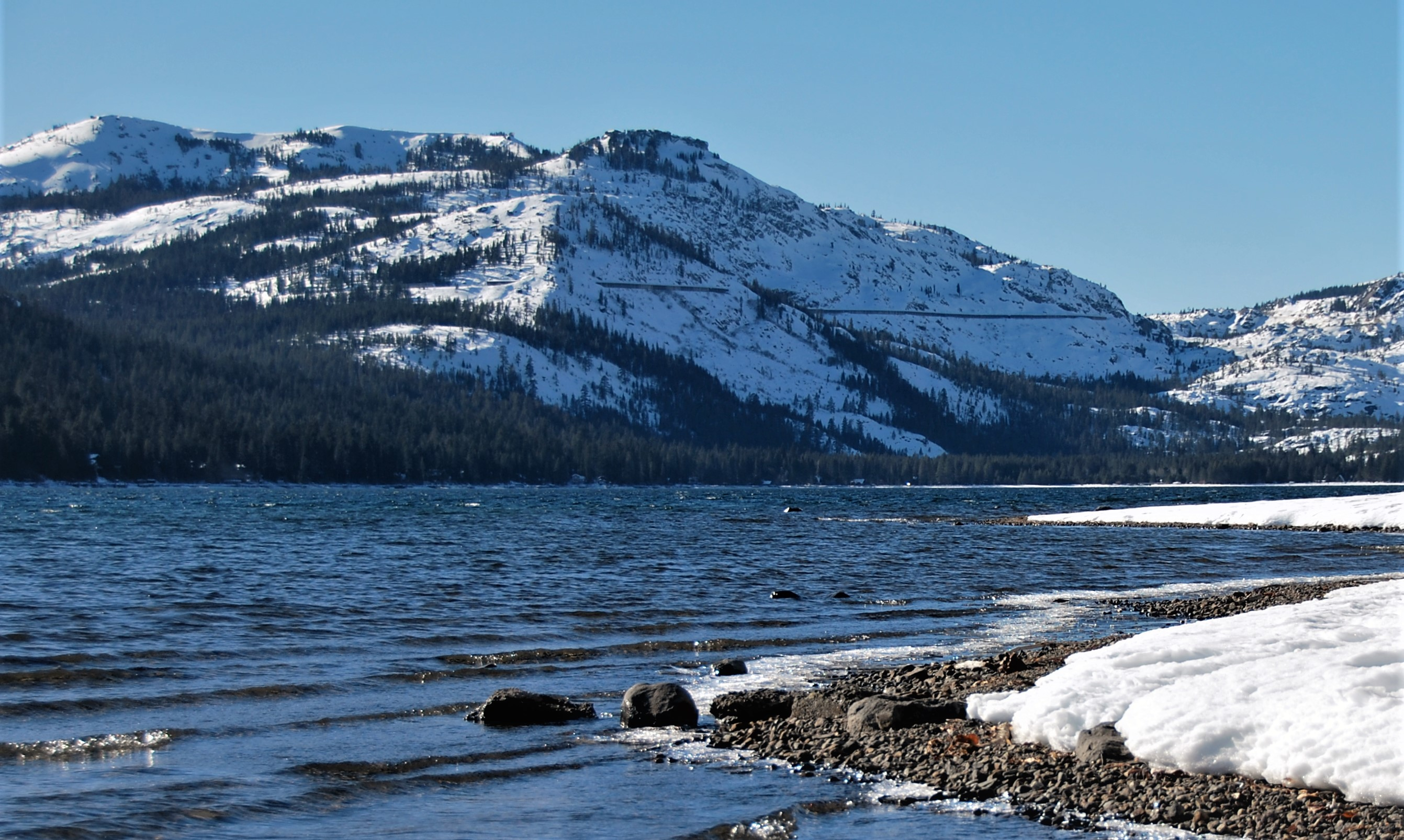
Mt. Judah (upper left), Donner Peak centered, from Donner Lake

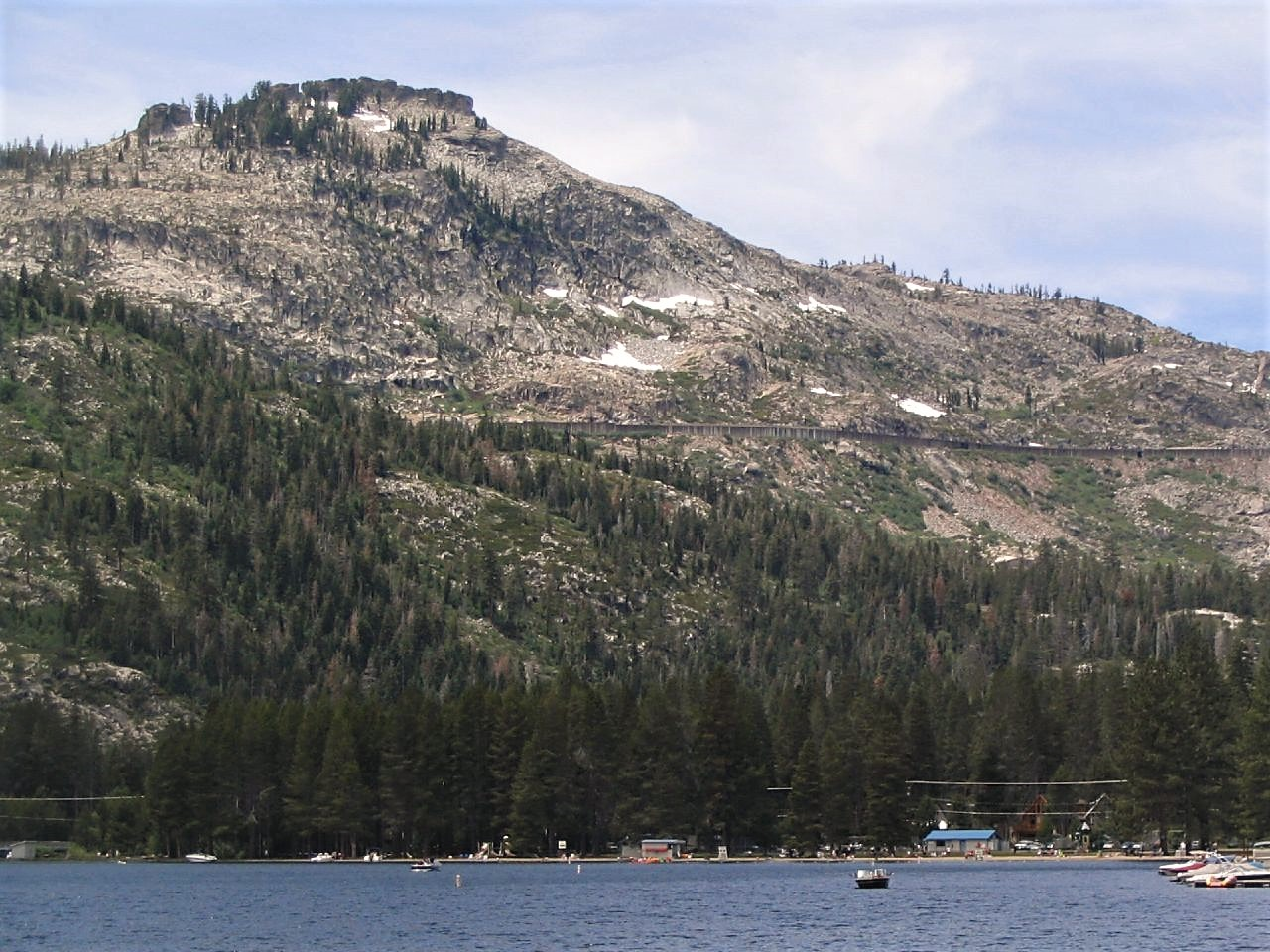
Northeast aspect of Donner Peak rises above the west end of Donner Lake

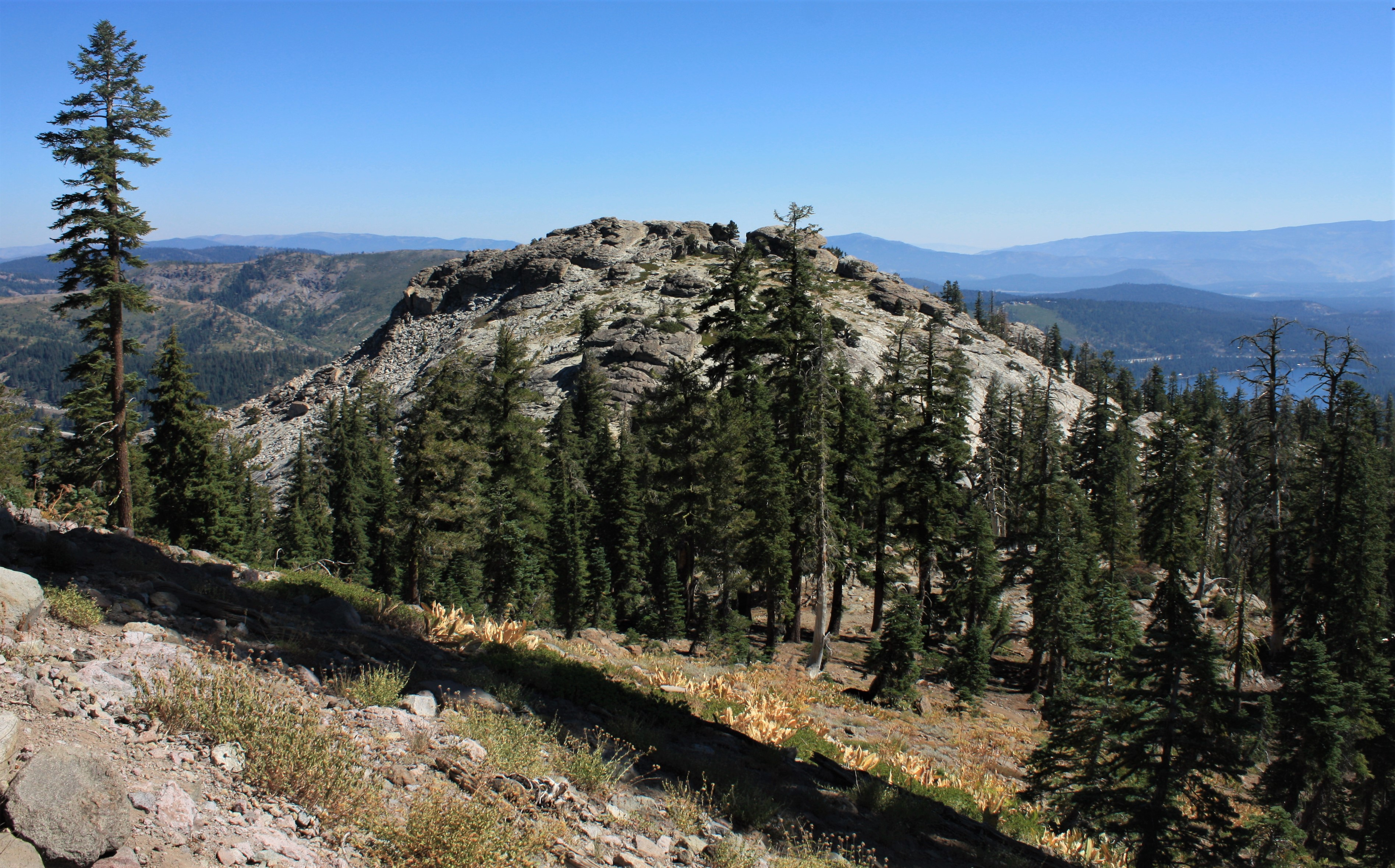
The top of Donner Peak from Mount Judah Loop Trail

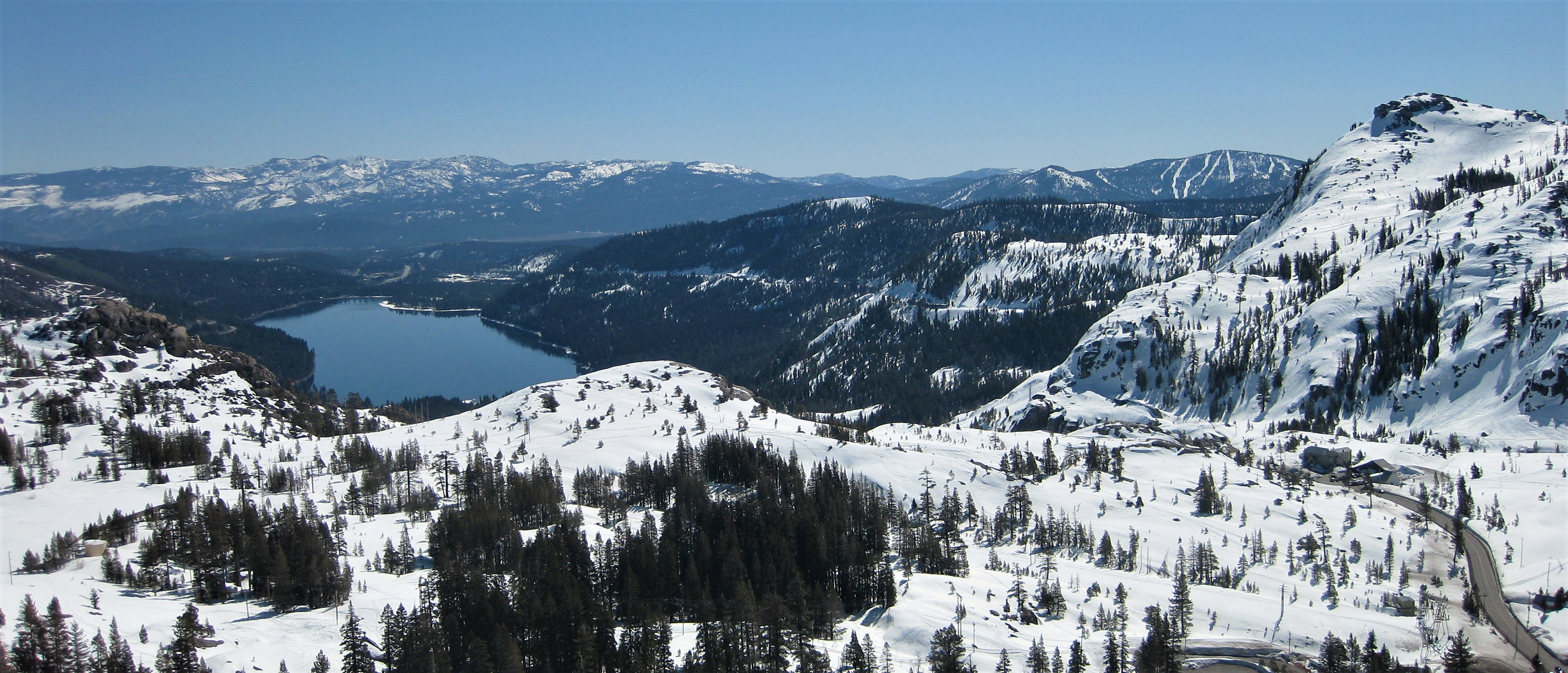
View east to Donner Lake, McGlashan Point, Donner Peak (right).

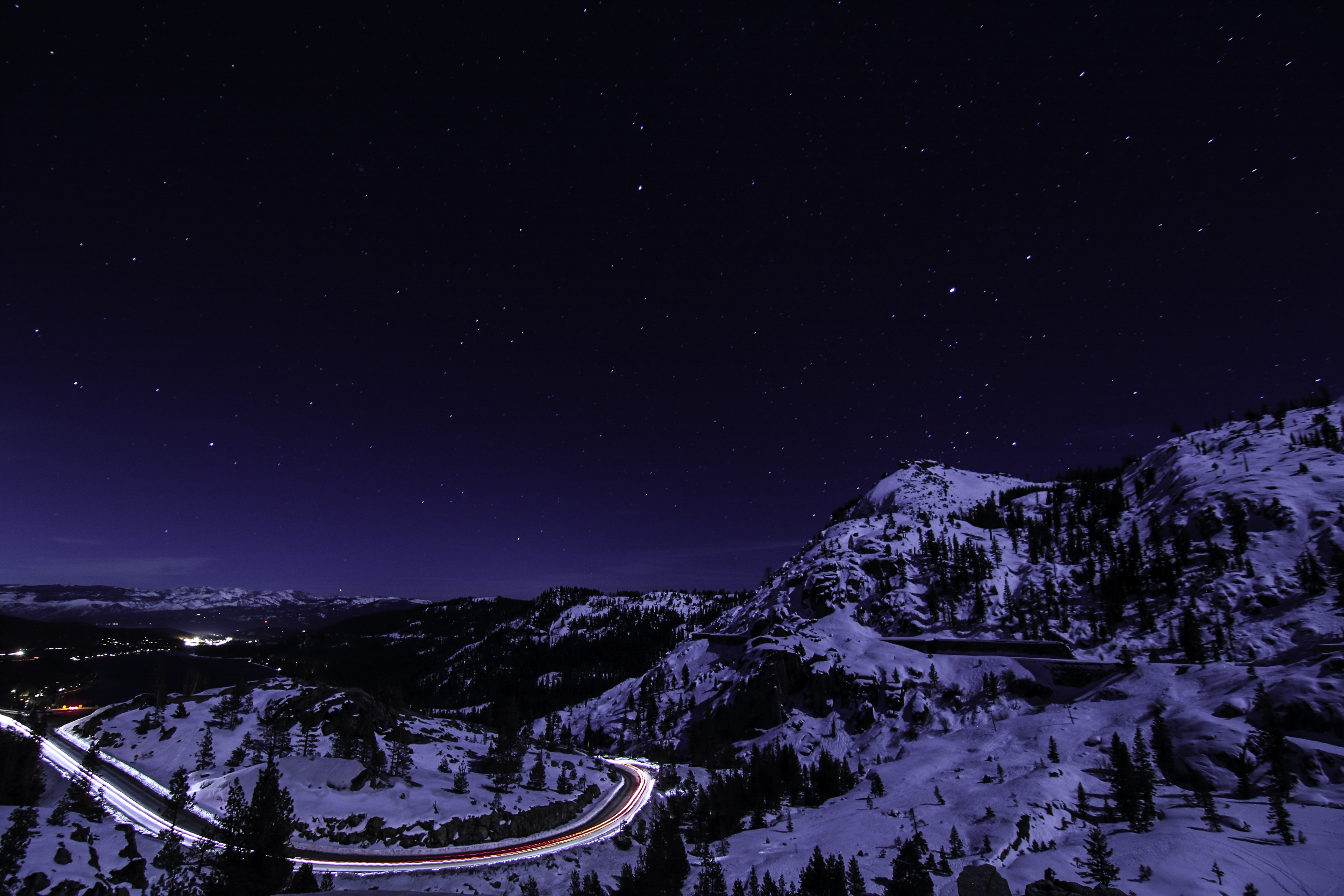
Donner Peak right of center

== See also ==
- Donner Pass
