= Mount Judah =

Mountain in the state of California

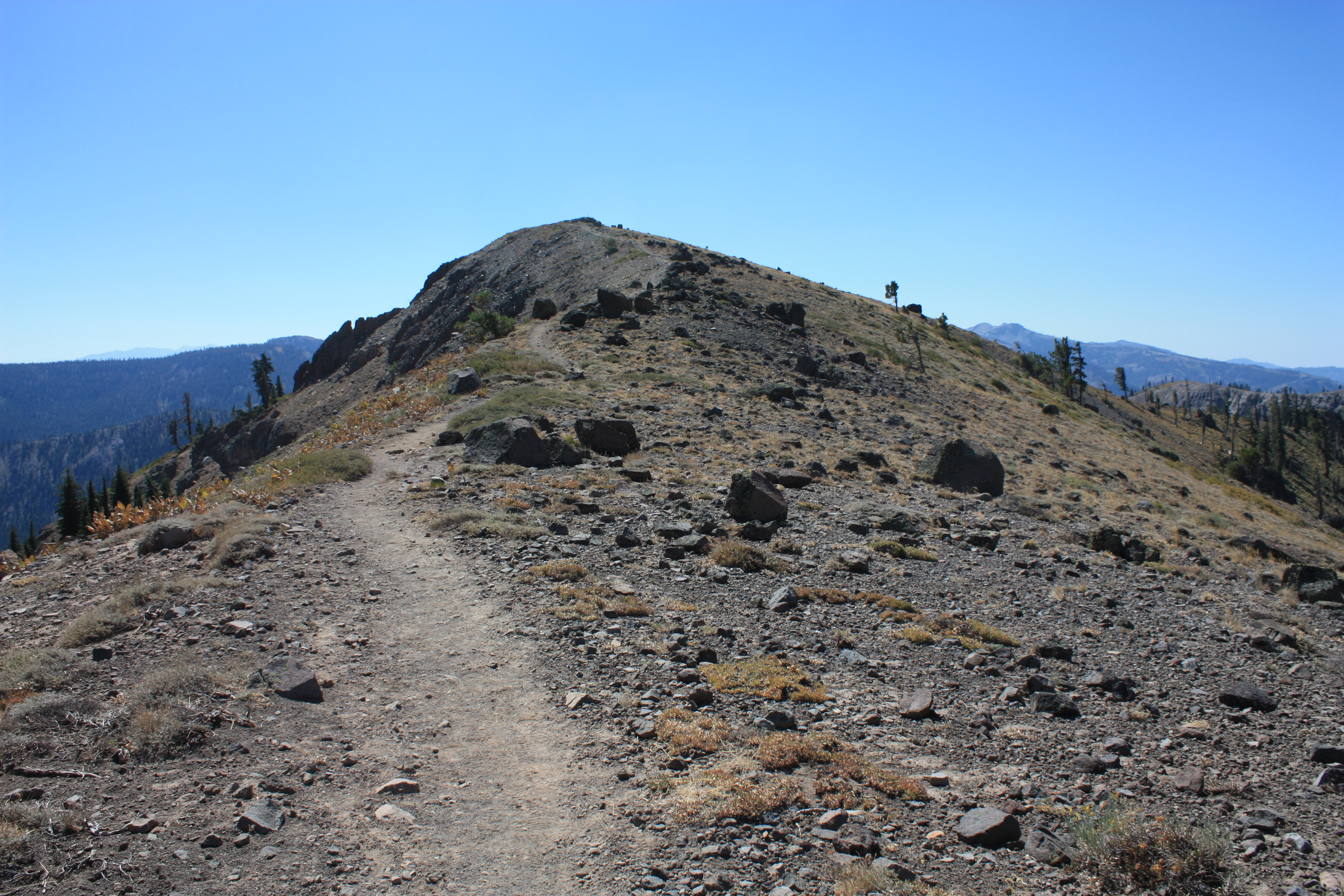
- Approaching the summit

Highest point
- Elevation: 8,243 ft (2,512 m)
- Prominence: 363 ft (111 m)
- Parent peak: Mount Lincoln (8,383 ft)
- Isolation: 1.01 mi (1.63 km)
- Coordinates: 39°17′55″N 120°18′56″W

Naming
- Etymology: Theodore Dehone Judah

Geography
- Location within California Location within the United States
- Location: Donner Pass
- Country: United States of America
- State: California
- County: Placer
- Parent range: Sierra Nevada
- Topo map: USGS Norden

Climbing
- Easiest route: class 1 trail

Mount Judah is an 8,243-foot-elevation (2,512-meter) mountain summit in Placer County, California, United States.

== Description ==
Mount Judah is located one mile southeast of Donner Pass at Sugar Bowl Ski Resort, on land managed by Tahoe National Forest. It is situated on the crest of the Sierra Nevada mountain range, with precipitation runoff from the peak draining west to South Yuba River, and east to the Truckee River. Topographic relief is modest as the summit rises 1,480 feet (450 meters) above Lakeview Canyon in one mile. Neighbors include Donner Peak, 0.7 miles (1.1 km) to the north, Mount Disney 1.4 miles (2.3 km) west, and the nearest higher peak is Mount Lincoln, one mile (1.6 km) to the southwest. The Pacific Crest Trail traverses the west slope of the peak, providing an approach option from Donner Pass. The 4.35-mile Mt. Judah Loop Trail takes hikers across the summit, and is the most popular trail in the Donner Pass area.

== History ==
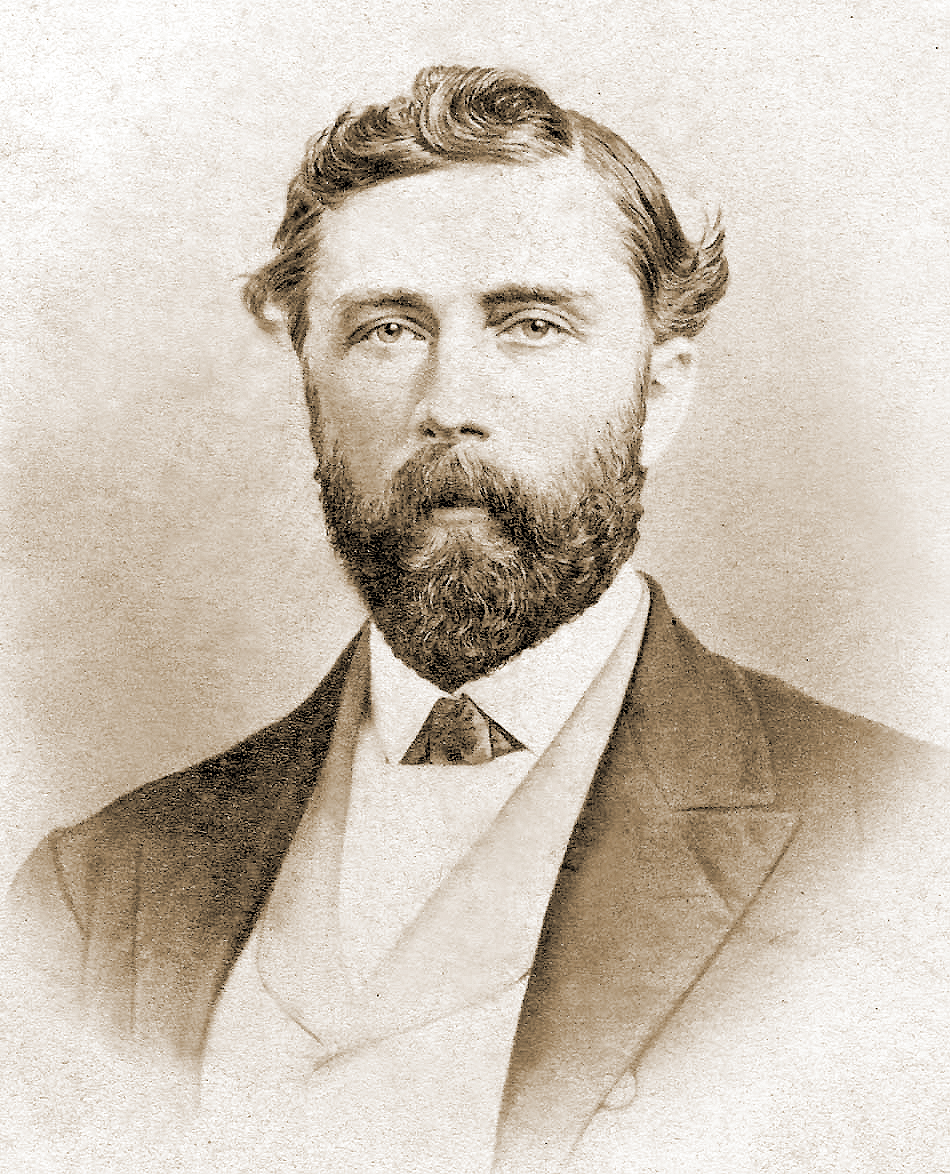
Theodore Judah

This landform's toponym was officially adopted October 18, 1940, by the U.S. Board on Geographic Names to honor Theodore Judah (1826–1863), an American civil engineer who played a leading part in the promotion and design of the First Transcontinental Railroad.

President Abraham Lincoln supported a transcontinental railroad to Northern California, and in 1862 signed the Pacific Railroad Acts to begin construction. The Sierra Nevada posed a major obstacle to the project, and Theodore Judah decided the best route for the railroad was through Donner Pass as it required only one summit crossing rather than two required of other possible options. The 1865 route originally traversed steep cliffs of Donner Peak via tunnels and snow sheds before the 10,322-foot-long (3,146 m) Tunnel #41 running under Mount Judah opened in 1925.

The California Trail, which crossed Roller Pass between Mount Lincoln and Mount Judah, was one of the wagon trails through Donner Pass used by pioneers on the way to Sutter's Fort. In April 1846, 90 people departed Springfield, Illinois, en route to California. The ill-fated journey of the Donner Party tragically ended nearby when they were snowbound at Donner Lake before they could cross this pass.

== Climate ==
According to the Köppen climate classification system, Mount Judah is located in an alpine climate zone. Most weather fronts originate in the Pacific Ocean and travel east toward the Sierra Nevada mountains. As fronts approach, they are forced upward by the peaks (orographic lift), causing them to drop their moisture in the form of rain or snowfall onto the range. Donner Pass averages 51.6 inches (1,310 mm) of precipitation per year, and with an average of 411.5 inches (10.45 m) of snow per year, it is one of the snowiest places in the contiguous United States. This climate supports five ski areas at Donner Pass.

== Gallery ==
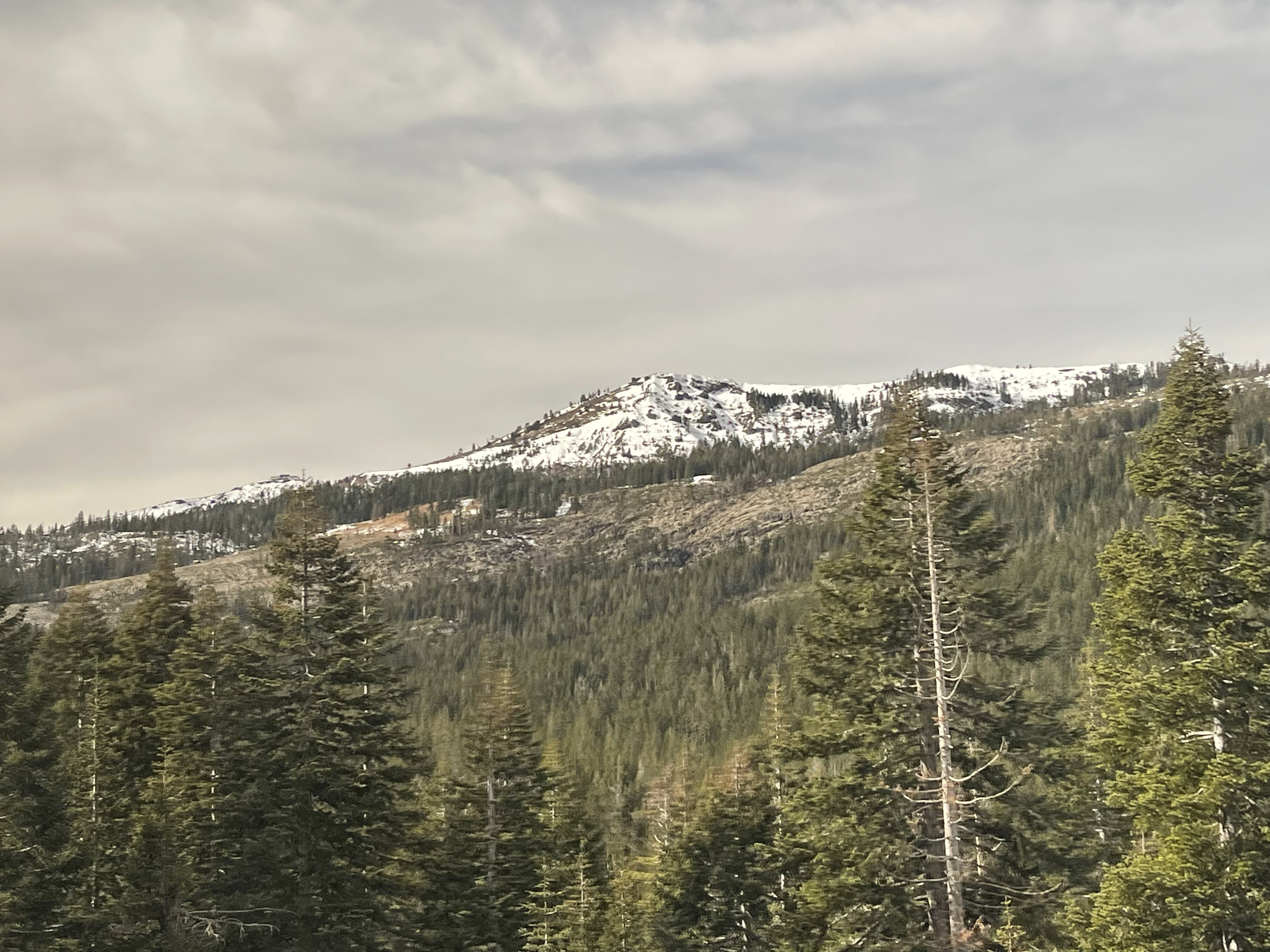
East aspect seen from the California Zephyr

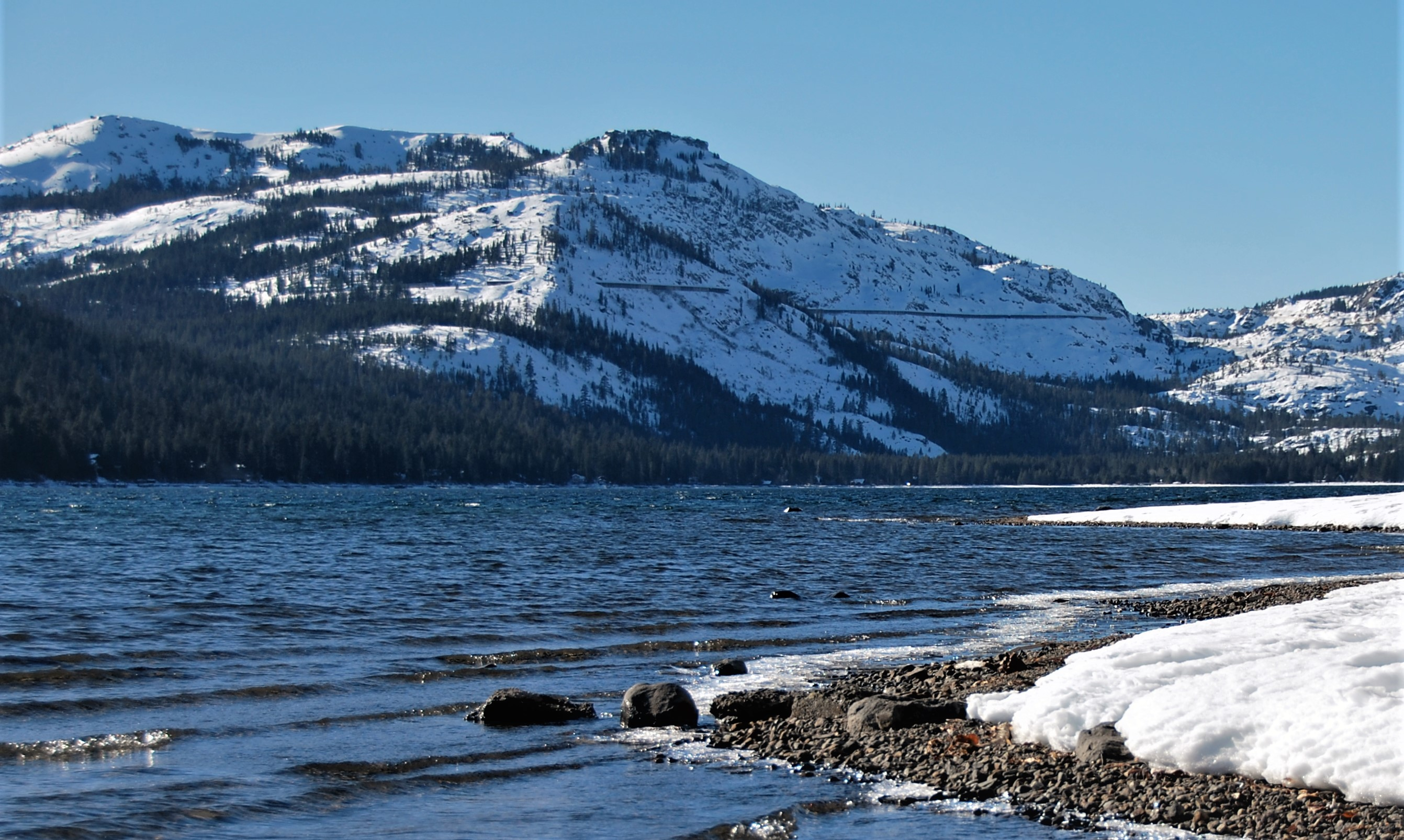
Mt. Judah (upper left), Donner Peak centered, from Donner Lake

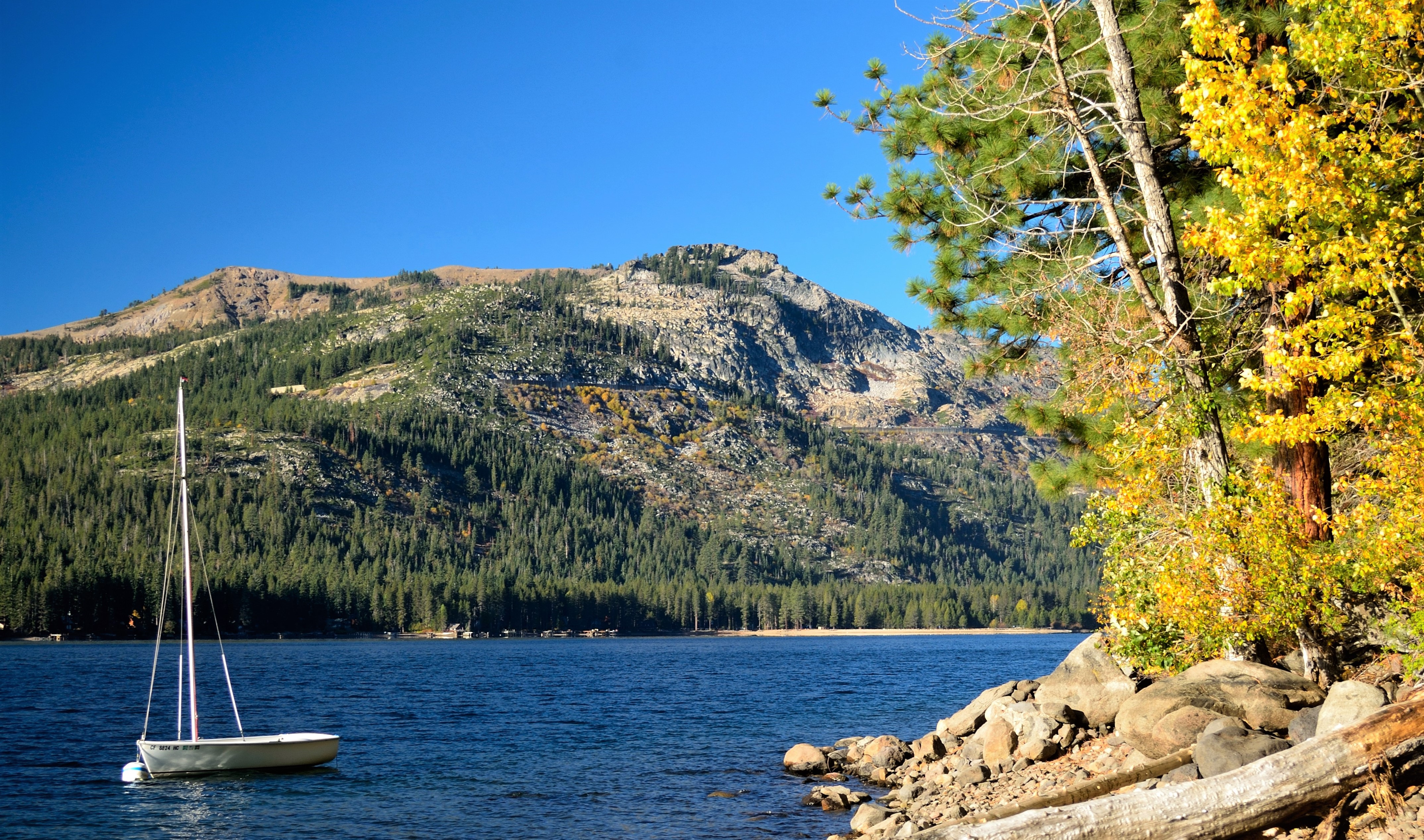
Boat's mast pointed at reddish Mount Judah.
Donner Peak centered, from Donner Lake

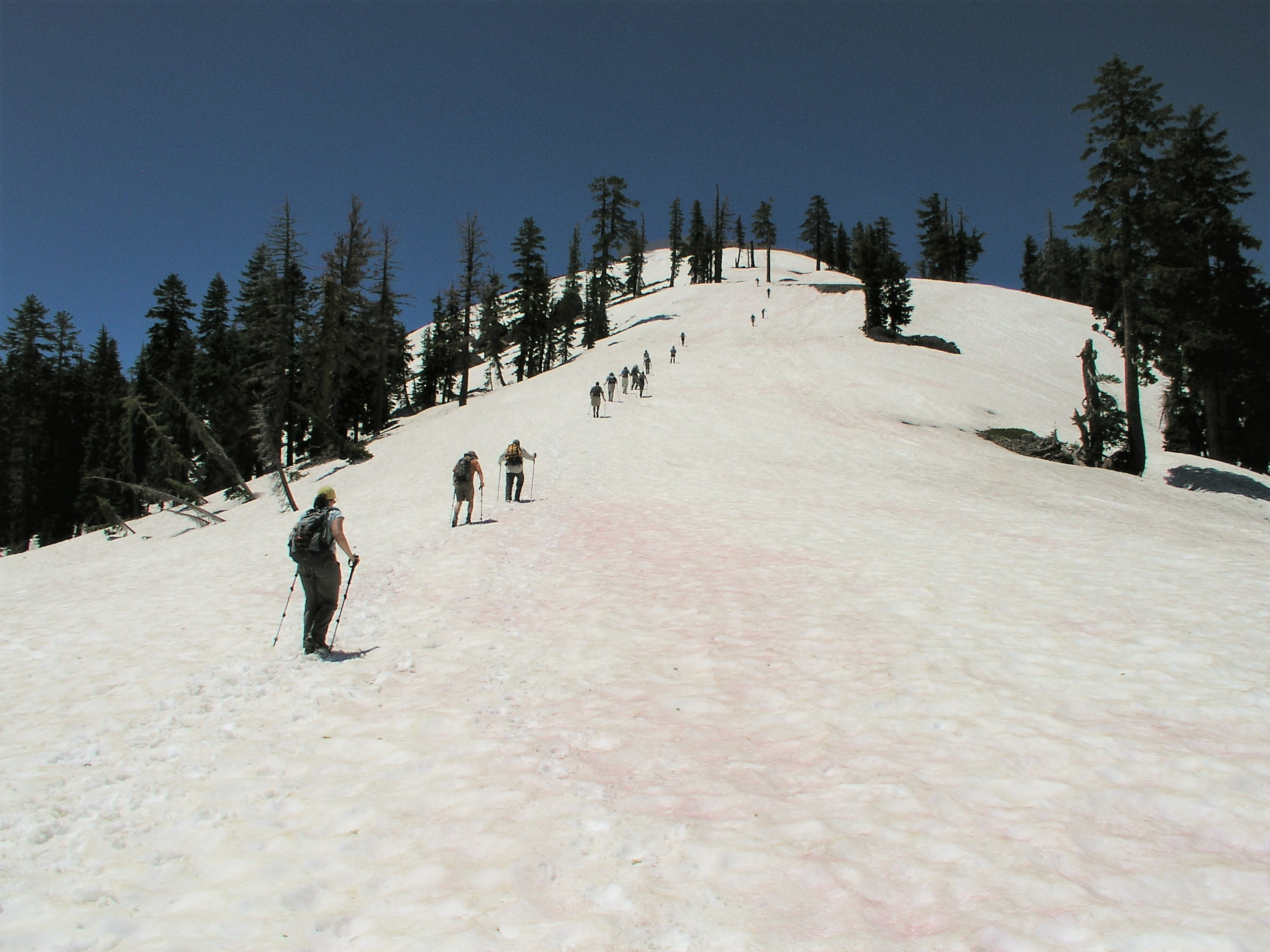
Ascending Mt. Judah from the col with Donner Peak

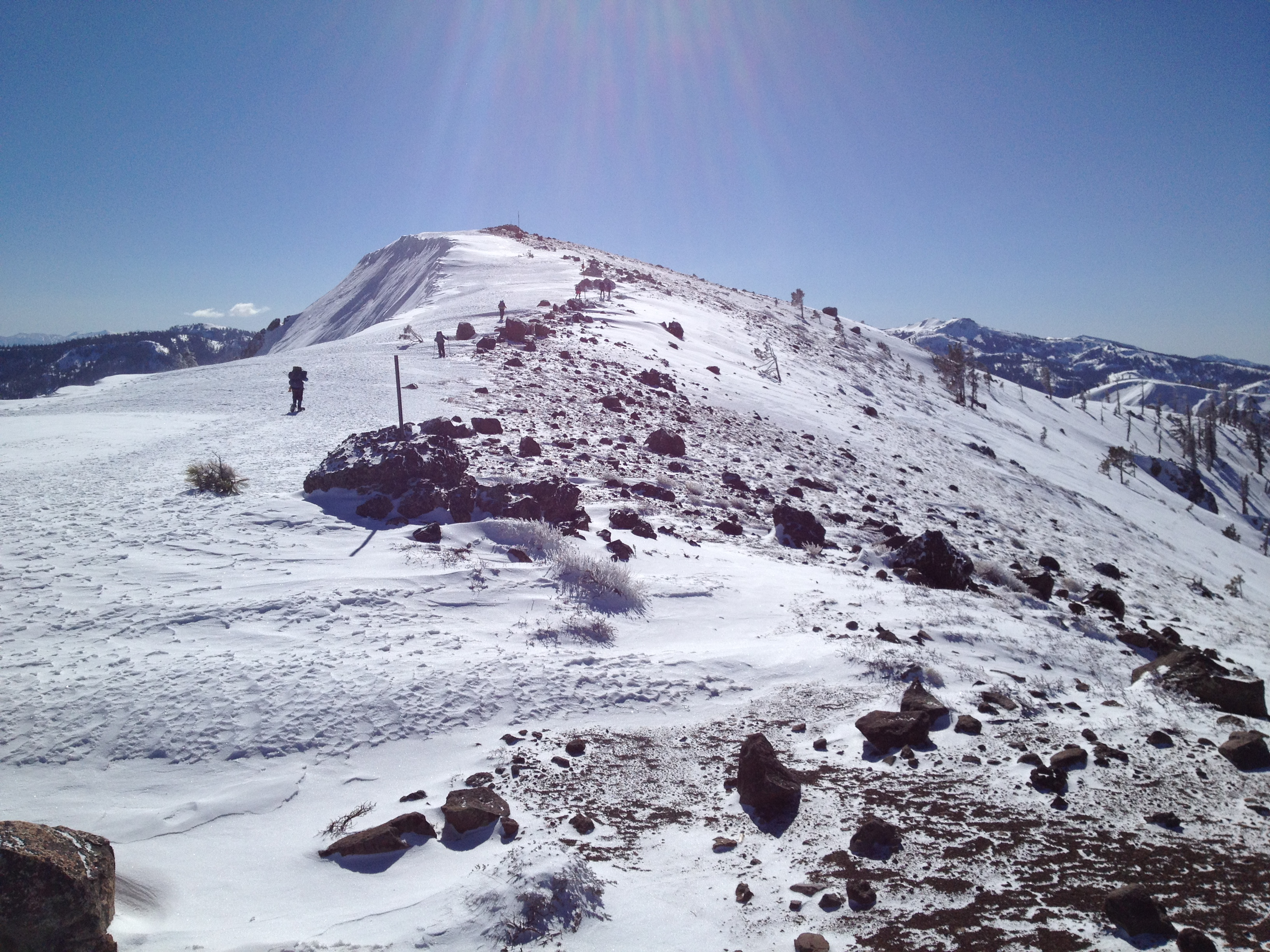
Climbing to the summit in winter

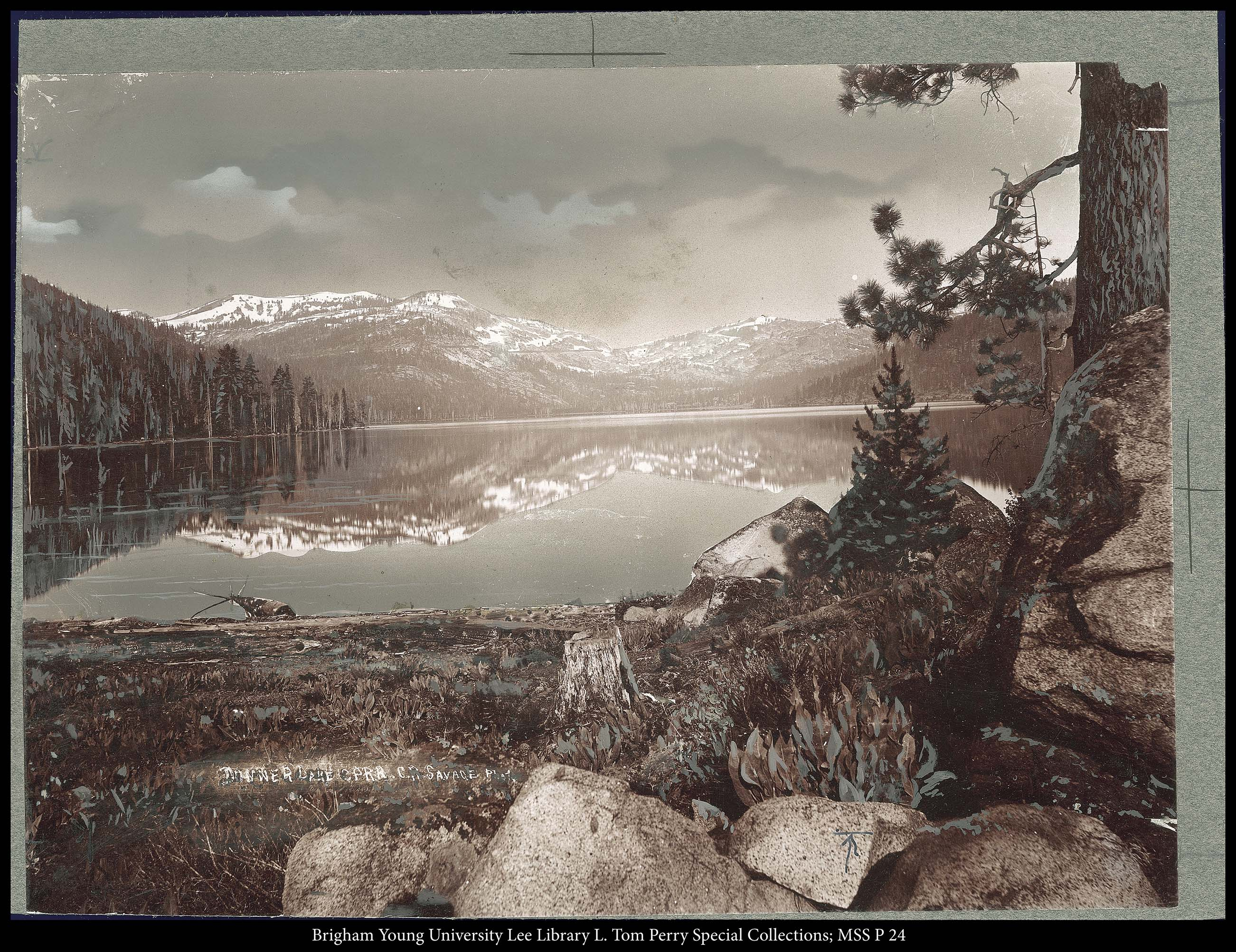
Mt. Judah upper left, from Donner Lake.
Collodion process image, circa 1870.

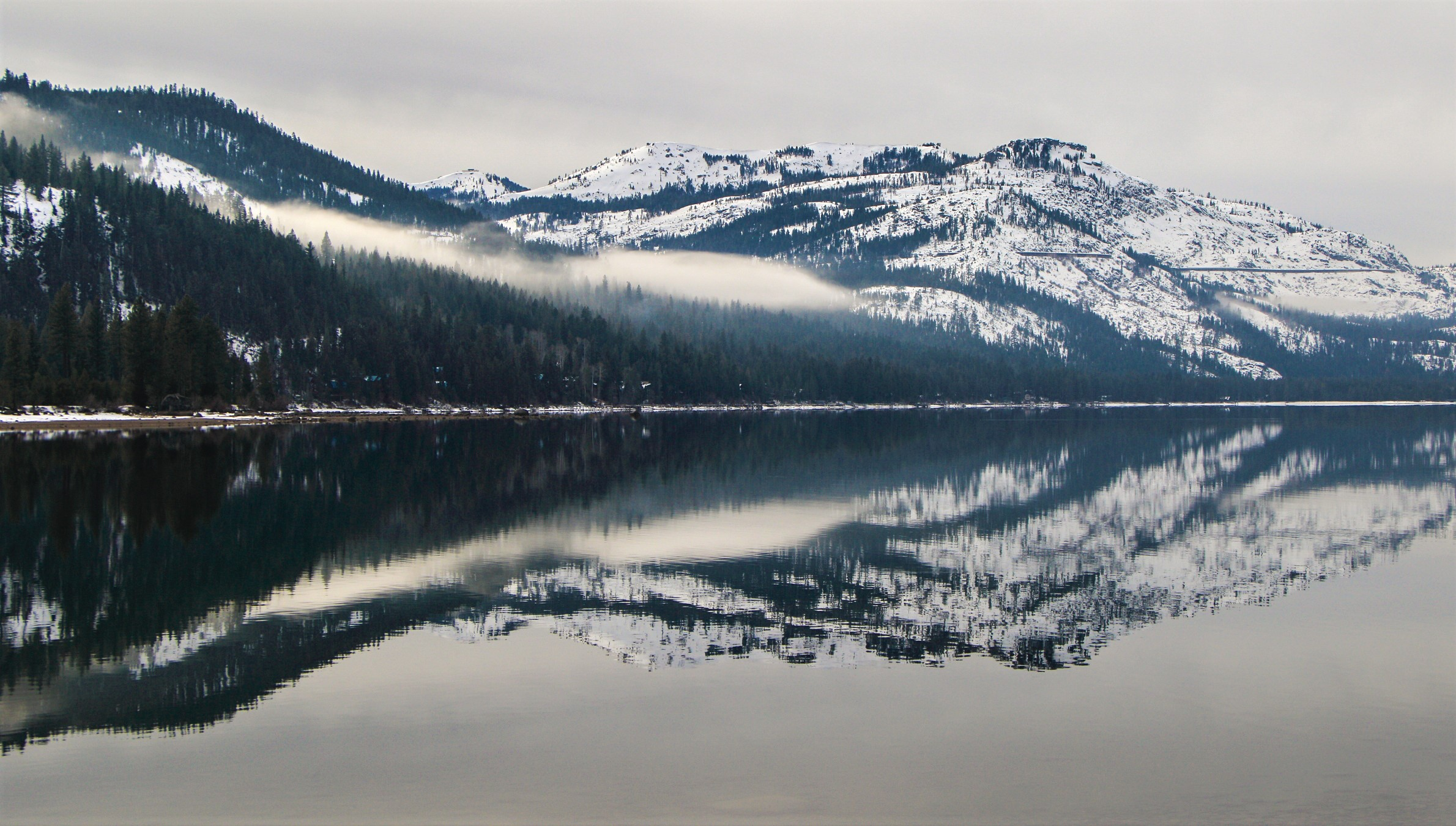
Mt. Judah centered

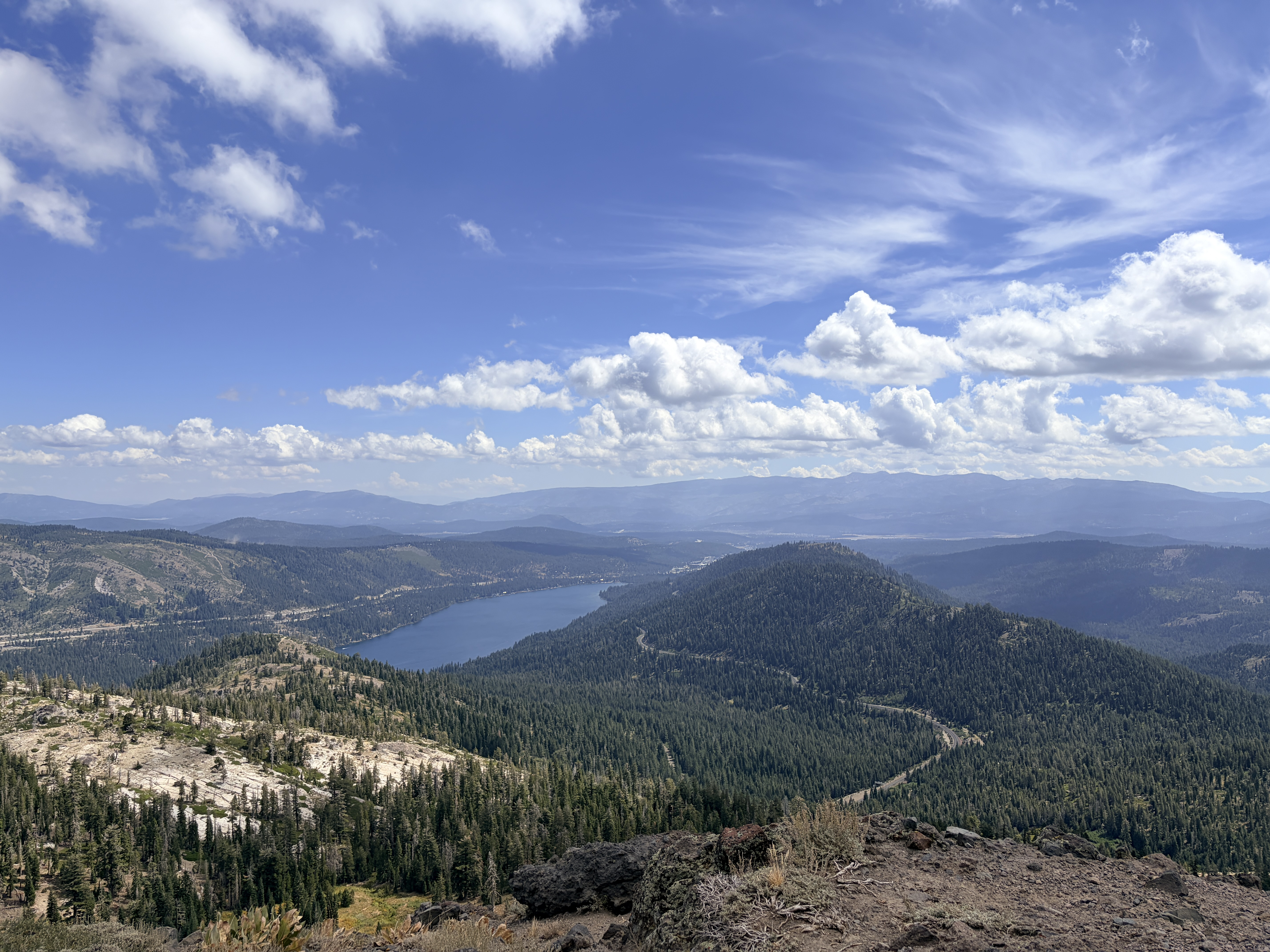
View of Donner Lake from the peak

== See also ==
- Sugar Bowl Ski Resort
