= Tunnel No. 41 =

Railway tunnel in California

- Interactive map of Tunnel No. 41

Overview
- Other names: The Big Hole, Summit Tunnel
- Line: Roseville Subdivision
- Location: Norden, California
- Coordinates: 39°18′18″N 120°19′3″W
- Crosses: Donner Summit

Operation
- Opened: 1925
- Owner: Union Pacific Railroad
- Traffic: freight, Amtrak

Technical
- Length: 10,325 ft (3,147 m)
- No. of tracks: 1
- Track gauge: 4 ft 8 1/2 in (1,435 mm) standard gauge
- Max elevation: 6,887 ft (2,099 m)
- Tunnel clearance: double-stack container capable

Tunnel Number 41, or the Big Hole, is a single-track railway tunnel underneath Mount Judah in the Sierra Nevada, near Norden, California. It is owned by the Union Pacific Railroad, in service as a part of the Roseville Subdivision of the Overland Route. Daily freight trains as well as Amtrak's California Zephyr utilize the line.

== History ==
The first bore through the Sierras, Tunnel Number 6, was built as part of the first transcontinental railroad. In 1901, Southern Pacific Company proposed building a long tunnel via a new alignment to both lower the track elevation and cut several miles off of the Donner Pass route. Bores with lengths up to 18 miles (29 km) in length were reportedly considered, but an option for a 5-mile-long (8.0 km) tunnel route was under consideration as late as 1912. The uncertain corporate fate of the Central Pacific Railroad and the outbreak of World War I stalled further work.

After Southern Pacific Company was cleared to continue ownership of the Central Pacific in 1923, they announced a new tunneled route would be constructed and work began soon after. The tunnel opened to traffic on September 19, 1925 as the third-longest rail tunnel in the United States at 10,325 feet (2 mi; 3,147 m) in length. The new tunnel and cutoff shortened the route by 1.29 miles (2.08 km) and was 132 feet (40 m) lower in elevation than the previous bore through the summit, Tunnel No. 6. The new and old single track routes were used in tandem as a double-tracked route until the old route was mothballed in 1993. The line is capable of transporting double-stacked containers.

== See also ==
- List of tunnels documented by the Historic American Engineering Record in California
- Tunnel motors — locomotives designed to cope with long tunnels, especially those in the Sierra Nevada
  - EMD SD40T-2
  - EMD SD45T-2
