= Tunnel motor =

Tunnel motor may refer to:

- EMD SD40T-2 locomotive
- EMD SD45T-2 locomotive
- EMD GP15-1 locomotive
- EMD GP15T locomotive
- EMD GP15AC locomotive
