= Donner Pass =

Mountain pass in the Sierra Nevada, California

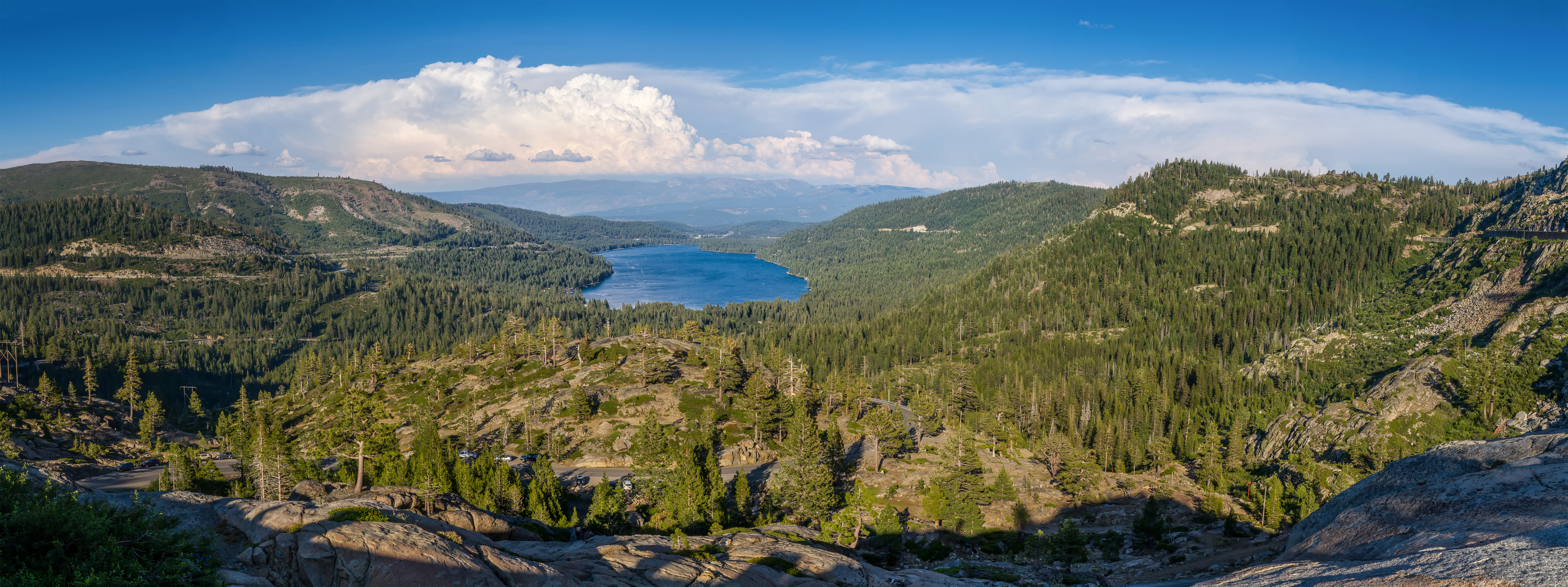
- Panorama of the view to the east in July 2013

- Location within California
- Elevation: 7,056 ft (2,151 m)
- Traversed by: California Trail; Lincoln Highway; US 40 (until 1964); Overland Route; I-80 (Indirectly, See below)

Location
- Location: Nevada County, California, United States
- Range: Sierra Nevada
- Coordinates: 39°18′52″N 120°19′37″W

Donner Pass is a 7,056-foot-high (2,151 m) mountain pass in the northern Sierra Nevada, above Donner Lake and Donner Memorial State Park about 9 miles (14 km) west of Truckee, California. Like the Sierra Nevada itself, the pass has a steep approach from the east and a gradual approach from the west.

The pass has been used by the California Trail, First transcontinental railroad, Overland Route, Lincoln Highway and Victory Highway (both later U.S. Route 40 and still later Donner Pass Road), as well as indirectly by Interstate 80. The pass gets its name from the ill-fated Donner Party who overwintered there in 1846.

Today, the area is home to a recreational community with several alpine lakes and ski resorts (Donner Ski Ranch, Boreal, and Sugar Bowl). The permanent communities in the area include Kingvale and Soda Springs, as well as the larger community below the pass surrounding Donner Lake.

== History ==
To reach California from the east, pioneers had to get their wagons over the Sierra Nevada mountain range. In 1844, the Stephens-Townsend-Murphy Party followed the Truckee River into the mountains. At the head of what is now called Donner Lake, they found a low notch in the mountains and became the first overland settlers to use the pass. The pass was named after a later group of California-bound settlers. In early November 1846, the Donner Party found the route blocked by snow and was forced to spend the winter on the east side of the mountains. Of the 81 settlers, only 45 survived to reach California, some of them resorting to cannibalism to survive.

On February 23, 1936, a blizzard trapped more than 750 motorists in Donner Pass, killing seven.

On January 13, 1952, 222 passengers and crew aboard a train became stranded about 17 miles (27 km) west of Donner Pass at Yuba Gap, on Track #1 adjacent to Tunnel 35 (on Track #2), at about MP 176.5. Southern Pacific Railroad's passenger train City of San Francisco was en route westbound through the gap when a blizzard dumped so much snow that the train was unable to move forward or reverse. The passengers and crew were stranded for three days until the nearby highway could be plowed sufficiently for a caravan of automobiles to carry them the few miles to Nyack Lodge.

== Central Pacific Railroad ==
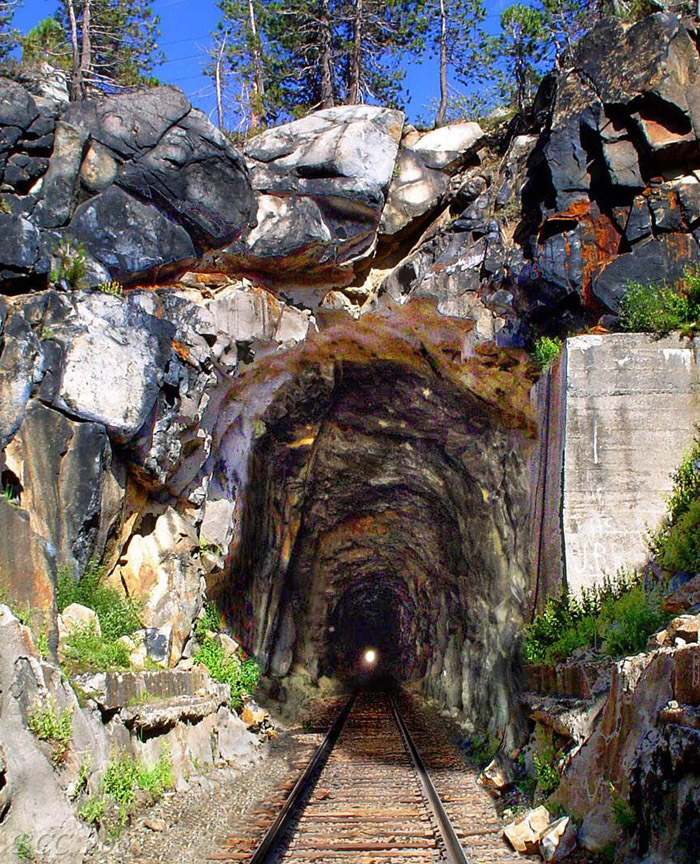
Summit Tunnel. Composite image: tracks removed in 1993 digitally restored

In the spring of 1868, the Sierra Nevada were finally overcome by the Central Pacific Railroad (CPRR), after almost three years of sustained drilling and blasting through granite by hundreds of Chinese workers, with the successful completion at Donner Pass of its 1,659-foot (506 m) Tunnel #6 (a.k.a. the Summit Tunnel) and associated grade, thus permitting the establishment of commercial transportation en masse of passengers and freight over the Sierra for the first time. Following a route first surveyed and proposed by CPRR's original Chief Engineer, Theodore D. Judah (1826–1863), the construction of the four tunnels, several miles of snowsheds, and a hand-crafted stone retaining wall 75-foot (23 m) tall (a.k.a. Chinese or China Wall in recognition of the Chinese builders), necessary to breach Donner Summit, constituted the most difficult engineering and construction challenge of the original Sacramento–Ogden CPRR route.

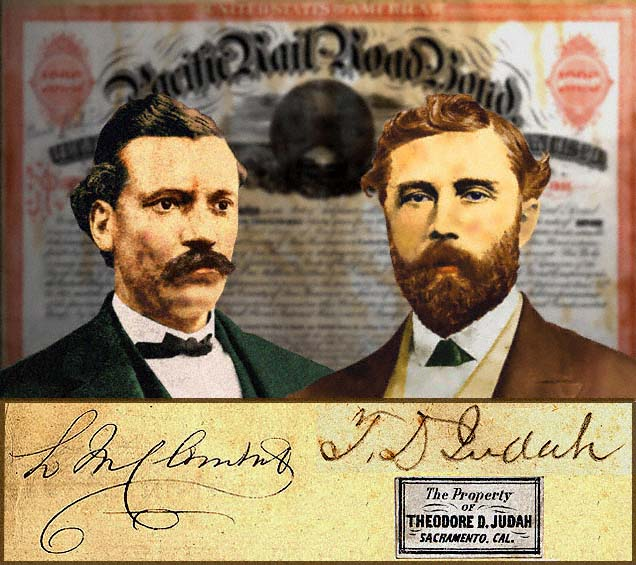
CPRR Engineers L. M. Clement and T. D. Judah

Principally designed and built under the personal, often on-site direction of CPRR's Chief Assistant Engineer, Lewis M. Clement (1837–1914), the original (Track 1) summit grade remained in daily use from June 18, 1868, when the first CPRR passenger train ran through the Summit Tunnel, until 1993 when the Southern Pacific Railroad (SP) (which operated the CPRR-built Oakland-Ogden line until its 1996 merger with the Union Pacific Railroad (UP)) abandoned the 6.7 mile (10.7 km) section of Track #1 over the summit running between the Norden complex (Shed 26, MP 192.1) and the covered crossovers in Shed #47 (MP 198.8), one mile east of the old flyover at Eder. All traffic has since operated over the Track #2 grade crossing the summit 1 mile (1.6 km) south of Donner Pass through the 10,322-foot (3,146 m)-long Tunnel #41 running under Mount Judah between Soda Springs and Eder. SP made this change because the railroad considered Track 2 and Tunnel 41 (which was opened in 1925 when the summit section of the grade was finally double-tracked) to be easier and less expensive to maintain during the harsh Sierra winters than the Track 1 tunnels and snow sheds over the summit.

In conjunction with major ongoing upgrades and expansions being made to the Port of Oakland to better accommodate the rapidly growing North American trade with Asia and the Pacific, the cooperation of UP, the Port's principal rail partner, has been sought to "construct a second track and raise tunnel clearances over Donner Pass for container trains linking California with the rest of the country." This would likely require either a new parallel tunnel next to Tunnel 41 or the replacement of the summit section of Track 1 between the Norden complex and Shed 47; either would increase capacity and effectively eliminate delays currently caused by having to run all east and west bound traffic between Norden and Shed 47 over a single track. (To eliminate bottleneck delays, the now single-track 7.1-mile (11.4 km) section between Switch 9 (MP 171.9) at Emigrant Gap and Shed 10 (MP 179.0) west of Cisco would likely also have to be restored to double track.) Improvements were completed on the Sierra grade in November 2009, including increasing 18,000 feet (5.5 km) of tunnel clearances in 15 restricted tunnels between Rocklin and Truckee and upgrading 30 miles (48 km) of signals to CTC, although the original Donner Pass grade (Track 1) was not restored. Since then, trains of full-height or 20 feet 2 inches (6.15 m), double-stack container cars have run over Donner Pass; some tunnels on Track 2 between Bowman and Colfax were not enlarged, so stack trains in both directions must use the older, tunnel-free Track 1 between those points.

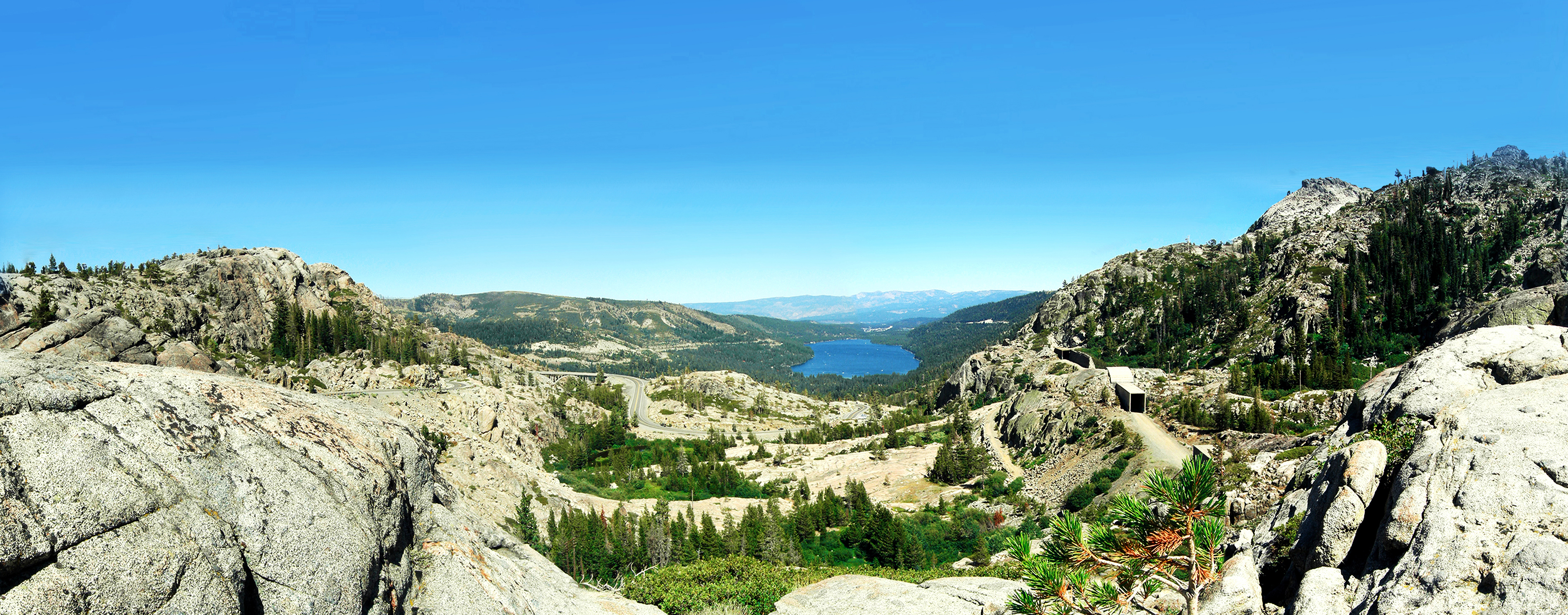
Panoramic view of Donner Summit from above CPRR Tunnel #6 with Donner Lake in the distance and Donner Peak to right

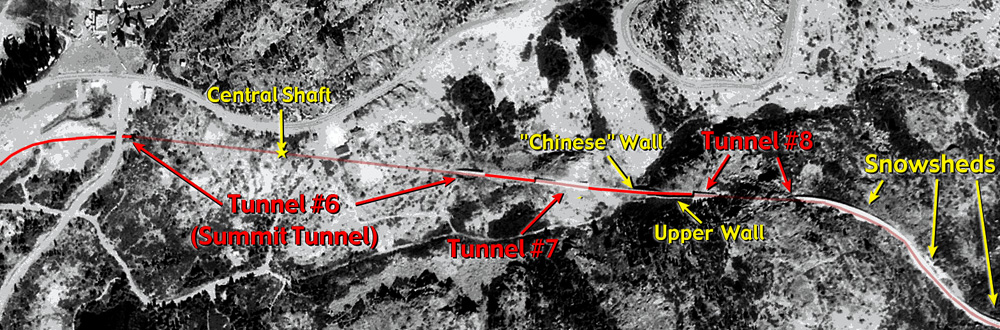
Route of the original CPRR grade at Donner Pass

== Highways ==
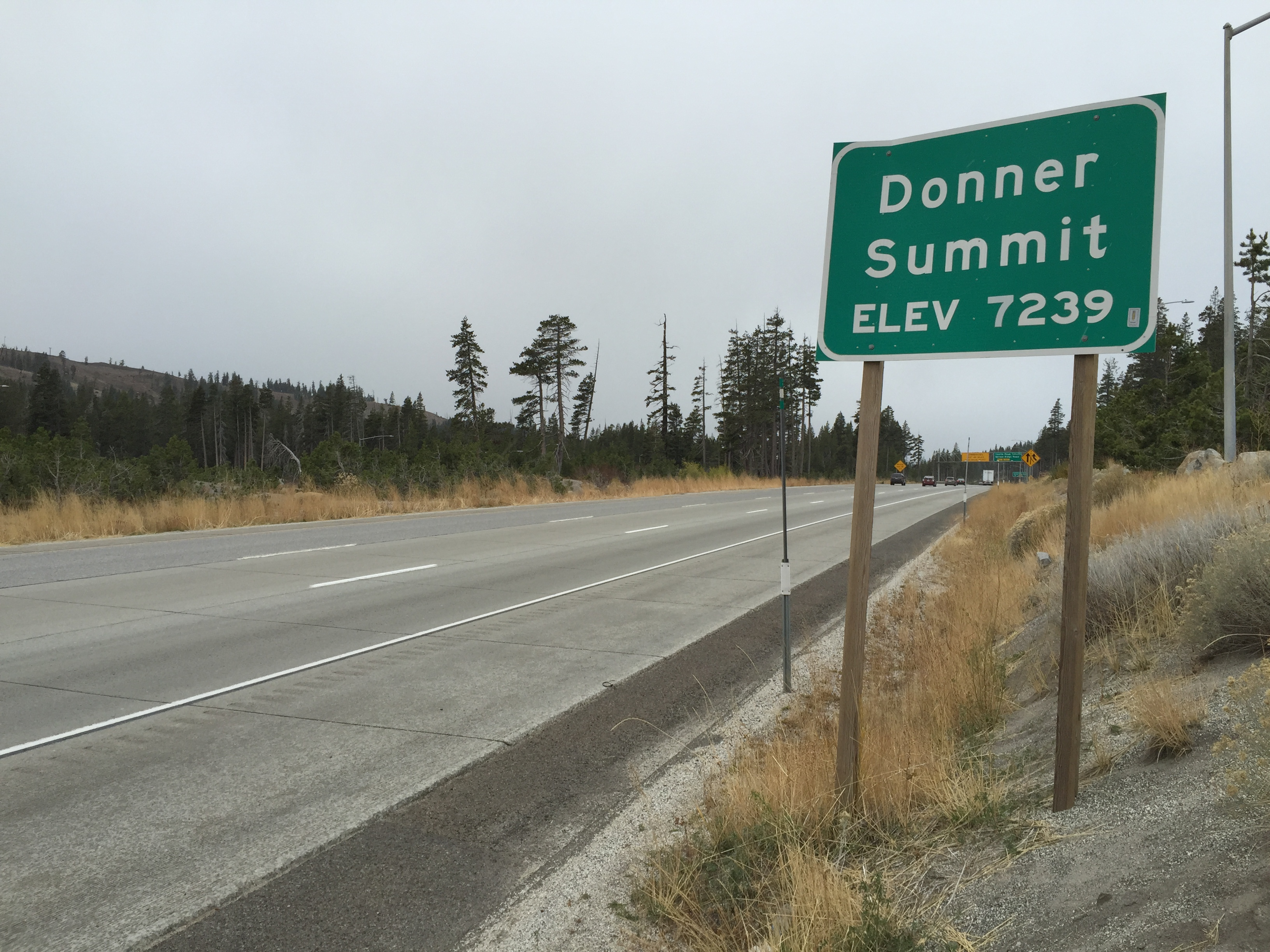
Sign for Donner Summit on Interstate 80

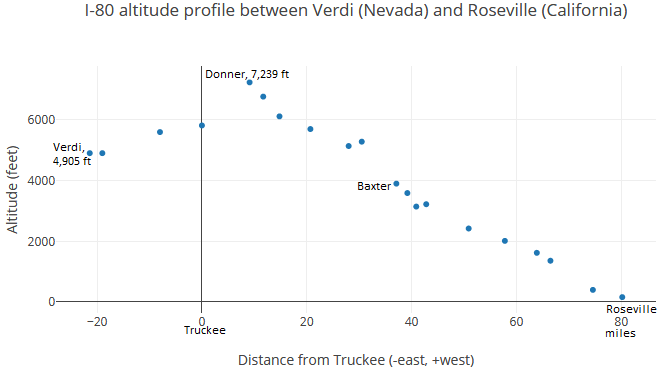
Altitudes along a 100-mile stretch of I-80, peaking at Donner Summit

The Lincoln Highway, the first road across America, crosses Donner Pass; this was also a part of the Victory Highway. Interstate 80 was built through this area in the early 1960s. I-80 generally parallels the route of US 40 through the Sierra Nevada, but it crosses the Sierra crest at the Euer Saddle, about 2 miles (3.2 km) north of Donner Pass. Euer Saddle, along with a nearby park on the south side of the freeway, are commonly called "Donner Summit" by the state of California. At 7,240 feet (2,210 m) (39.339872°N 120.343958°W) Donner Summit is about 150 feet (46 m) higher than Donner Pass, but is wider and has a gentler approach that aided construction to Interstate Highway standards, which do not allow the sharp curves used by the Donner Pass Road. The grade is 3–6% for 30 miles (48 km). The 1920s highway has been preserved as a scenic alternative to I-80.

== Weather ==
Donner Pass's precipitation averages 51.6 inches (1,310 mm) per year, and because California has a Mediterranean climate wherein most precipitation falls in the winter, much of it falls as snow. At an average of 411.5 inches (10.45 m) per year, Donner Pass is one of the snowiest places in the contiguous United States. Four times since 1880, total snowfall at Donner Summit has exceeded 775 inches (19.69 m) and topped 800 inches (20.32 m) in both 1938 and 1952. To take advantage of the heavy snows, the Boreal Ski Resort was built to the north. Ski resorts in the Lake Tahoe area report an average of 300 to 500 inches (7.62 to 12.70 m) of snowfall per season. Winds in the pass can also become extreme, and wind gusts in excess of 100 miles per hour (160 km/h) are common during winter storms. Winter temperatures in the area drop below 0 °F or −17.8 °C several times each year; the all-time record low for California of −45 °F (−42.8 °C) was recorded at Boca (east of Truckee) in January 1937.

The winter of 1846–47 was especially severe, contributing to the disaster of the Donner Party.

Climate data for Soda Springs 39.3019 N, 120.3856 W, Elevation: 6,887 ft (2,099 m) (1991–2020 normals)
Month	Jan	Feb	Mar	Apr	May	Jun	Jul	Aug	Sep	Oct	Nov	Dec	Year
Mean daily maximum °F (°C)	40.0 (4.4)	40.5 (4.7)	43.5 (6.4)	47.8 (8.8)	56.1 (13.4)	65.7 (18.7)	74.8 (23.8)	75.0 (23.9)	69.8 (21.0)	58.6 (14.8)	46.3 (7.9)	39.0 (3.9)	54.8 (12.6)
Daily mean °F (°C)	31.3 (−0.4)	31.2 (−0.4)	33.6 (0.9)	37.3 (2.9)	44.7 (7.1)	53.2 (11.8)	61.4 (16.3)	61.3 (16.3)	56.5 (13.6)	46.8 (8.2)	36.7 (2.6)	30.4 (−0.9)	43.7 (6.5)
Mean daily minimum °F (°C)	22.5 (−5.3)	22.0 (−5.6)	23.7 (−4.6)	26.7 (−2.9)	33.3 (0.7)	40.7 (4.8)	48.0 (8.9)	47.6 (8.7)	43.1 (6.2)	35.0 (1.7)	27.1 (−2.7)	21.8 (−5.7)	32.6 (0.4)
Average precipitation inches (mm)	13.16 (334)	12.26 (311)	12.15 (309)	6.99 (178)	4.74 (120)	1.57 (40)	0.43 (11)	0.45 (11)	0.99 (25)	3.89 (99)	7.57 (192)	14.35 (364)	78.55 (1,994)
Average snowfall inches (cm)	73.00 (185.4)	84.20 (213.9)	105.70 (268.5)	41.20 (104.6)	15.60 (39.6)	1.80 (4.6)	0.00 (0.00)	0.00 (0.00)	1.50 (3.8)	9.90 (25.1)	42.80 (108.7)	69.30 (176.0)	445 (1,130.2)
Source 1: PRISM Climate Group
Source 2: NOAA (precipitation & snowfall)

== Recreation ==
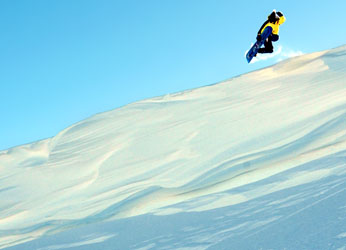
Snowboarder at Sugar Bowl Ski Resort, located near the top of Donner Pass

Sporting activities in the area include backpacking, alpine and cross-country skiing, rock and ice climbing. The original tunnel built by the Central Pacific Railroad is home to a large amount of tagging. The region was featured during the early 1990s in snowboarding films by Fall Line Films (FLF) and Standard Films for its easy access to frontcountry and backcountry terrain. However, its fame and quick access from Old Highway 40 or nearby Sugar Bowl Ski Resort have led to a large number of avalanche fatalities, including that of professional snowboarder Jamil Khan.

== Popular culture ==
The 1994 western-comedy film Wagons East features John Candy as James Harlow, the disgraced former wagon master for the Donner Party.

Albert Bierstadt's painting View of Donner Lake (1871–72) shows the view of the titular lake from the vicinity of the pass.

Jack Torrance tells his family the story of the Donner Party while driving through the mountains of Colorado when Wendy Torrance asks if the Donner Party was nearby in The Shining.

Donner Pass is featured in the History Channel special episode, America: The Story of Us: "Westward". It is also featured in the National Geographic Channel series Hell on the Highway, which focuses on the towing and recovery companies working the region.
