= List of Colorado ski resorts =

Coordinates: 38.9972°N 105.5478°W

The location of the State of Colorado in the United States of America.

This is a list of alpine ski resorts in the U.S. State of Colorado.

== List of ski resorts ==
- Arapahoe Basin
- Aspen Highlands (Aspen)
- Aspen Mountain (Aspen) (formerly Ajax)
- Beaver Creek Resort
- Breckenridge Ski Resort
- Buttermilk Ski Area (Aspen)
- Chapman Hill Ski Area
- Copper Mountain
- Cranor Ski Hill
- Crested Butte Mountain Resort
- Cuchara Mountain Park (formerly Cuchara Vally)
- Echo Mountain (formerly Squaw Pass)
- Eldora Mountain Resort
- Granby Ranch (formerly SolVista Basin and Silver Creek)
- Hesperus Ski Area
- Hoedown Hill
- Howelsen Hill Ski Area
- Kendall Mountain
- Keystone Resort
- Lake City Ski Hill
- Lee's Ski Hill
- Loveland Ski Area
- Monarch Mountain
- Powderhorn Resort
- Purgatory Resort (formerly Durango Mountain Resort)
- Silverton Mountain
- Ski Cooper
- Snowmass (Aspen)
- Steamboat Ski Resort
- Sunlight Ski Area
- Telluride Ski Resort
- Vail Ski Resort
- Winter Park Resort
- Wolf Creek Ski Area

== Former Colorado ski areas ==
- Adam's Rib
- Arapahoe East Ski Area
- Arrowhead (now part of Beaver Creek)
- Baker Mountain
- Berthoud Pass Ski Area
- Bluebird Backcountry
- Climax
- Coal Bank Pass
- Conquistador
- Cuchara Valley (Reopened for 25-26 Season, Now Cuchara Mountain Park)
- Emerald Mountain
- Fern Lake
- Geneva Basin Ski Area
- Hidden Valley
- Hoosier Pass
- Idlewild
- Ironton Park
- Jones Pass
- Libby Creek
- Little Annie
- Lizard Head Pass
- Marble Mountain
- Marshall Pass
- Meadow Mountain
- Mesa Creek
- Montezuma Basin
- Mount Lugo
- Peak One
- Pikes Peak
- Pioneer
- Porcupine Gulch
- Red Mountain
- Rock Creek
- Rozman Hill
- Saint Mary's Glacier
- Seven Utes Mountain
- Sharktooth
- Ski Broadmoor
- Ski Dallas
- Steamboat Lake
- Stoner
- White Pine
- Wolf Creek Pass (north of current Wolf Creek Ski Area)

== See also ==
- Comparison of Colorado ski resorts
- List of ski areas and resorts in the United States
- Bibliography of Colorado
- Geography of Colorado
- History of Colorado
- Index of Colorado-related articles
- List of Colorado-related lists
- Outline of Colorado
