= Comparison of Colorado ski resorts =

Colorado offers many ski resorts. The following table compares their various sizes, runs, lifts, and snowfall:

Name	Nearest city	Skiable area (acres)	Top elevation (feet)	Base elevation (feet)	Vertical (feet)	Runs	Lifts	Snowfall (in/year)	Date Statistics Updated
Arapahoe Basin	Dillon	1,428	13,050	10,520	2,530	147	9	314	March 2020
Aspen Highlands	Aspen	1,040	12,392	8,040	4,352	117	5	300	March 2020
Aspen Mountain	Aspen	675	11,212	7,945	3,267	76	8	300	March 2020
Beaver Creek	Beaver Creek	1,832	11,440	8,100	3,340	150	23	325	March 2020
Breckenridge	Breckenridge	2,908	12,998	9,600	3,398	187	34	282	March 2020
Buttermilk	Aspen	470	9,900	7,870	2,030	44	8	200	March 2020
Copper Mountain	Copper Mountain	2,490	12,441	9,712	2,738	140	24	278	March 2020
Crested Butte	Crested Butte	1,547	12,162	9,375	2,787	121	15	253	March 2020
Echo Mountain	Evergreen	60	10,650	10,050	600	13	3	275	
Eldora	Nederland	680	10,600	9,200	1,400	63	10	225	March 2020
Granby Ranch	Granby	406	9,202	8,202	1,000	35	6	200	
Hesperus	Hesperus	60	8,880	8,100	700	13	2	150	
Howelsen	Steamboat Springs	50	7,136	6,696	440	17	1	170	
Kendall	Silverton	16	9,540	9,300	240	11	1	200	
Keystone	Keystone	3,148	12,408	9,280	3,128	128	20	235	March 2020
Loveland	Dillon	1,800	13,010	10,800	2,210	94	11	422	December 2020
Monarch	Salida	1,146 (Note: Does not include 1,635 acres of guided backcountry terrain)	11,952	10,727	1,225	80	9	350	May 2026
Powderhorn	Grand Junction	1,600	9,850	8,200	1,650	50	4	250	December 2020
Purgatory	Durango	1,650	10,822	8,793	2,029	105	12	260	December 2020
Silverton Mountain	Silverton	1,819	13,487	10,400	3,087	69	1	400	December 2020
Ski Cooper	Leadville	480	11,700	10,500	1,200	64	5	250	May 2026
Snowmass	Snowmass Village	3,339	12,510	8,104	4,406	98	21	295	March 2020
Steamboat	Steamboat Springs	3,741	10,568	6,900	3,668	169	18	368	February 2024
Sunlight	Glenwood Springs	680	9,895	7,885	2,010	67	4	252	December 2020
Telluride	Telluride	2,000	13,150	8,725	3,790	148	17	276	March 2020
Vail	Vail	5,317	11,570	8,120	3,450	195	31	354	March 2020
Winter Park	Winter Park	3,081	12,060	9,000	3,060	166	23	347	March 2020
Wolf Creek	Pagosa Springs	1,600	11,904	10,300	1,604	133	9	430	February 2021

== See also ==
- Comparison of California ski resorts
- Comparison of New Mexico ski resorts
- Comparison of North American ski resorts
- Comparison of Southeastern United States ski resorts
- List of ski areas and resorts in the United States
