= Alice McKennis Duran =

American alpine skier

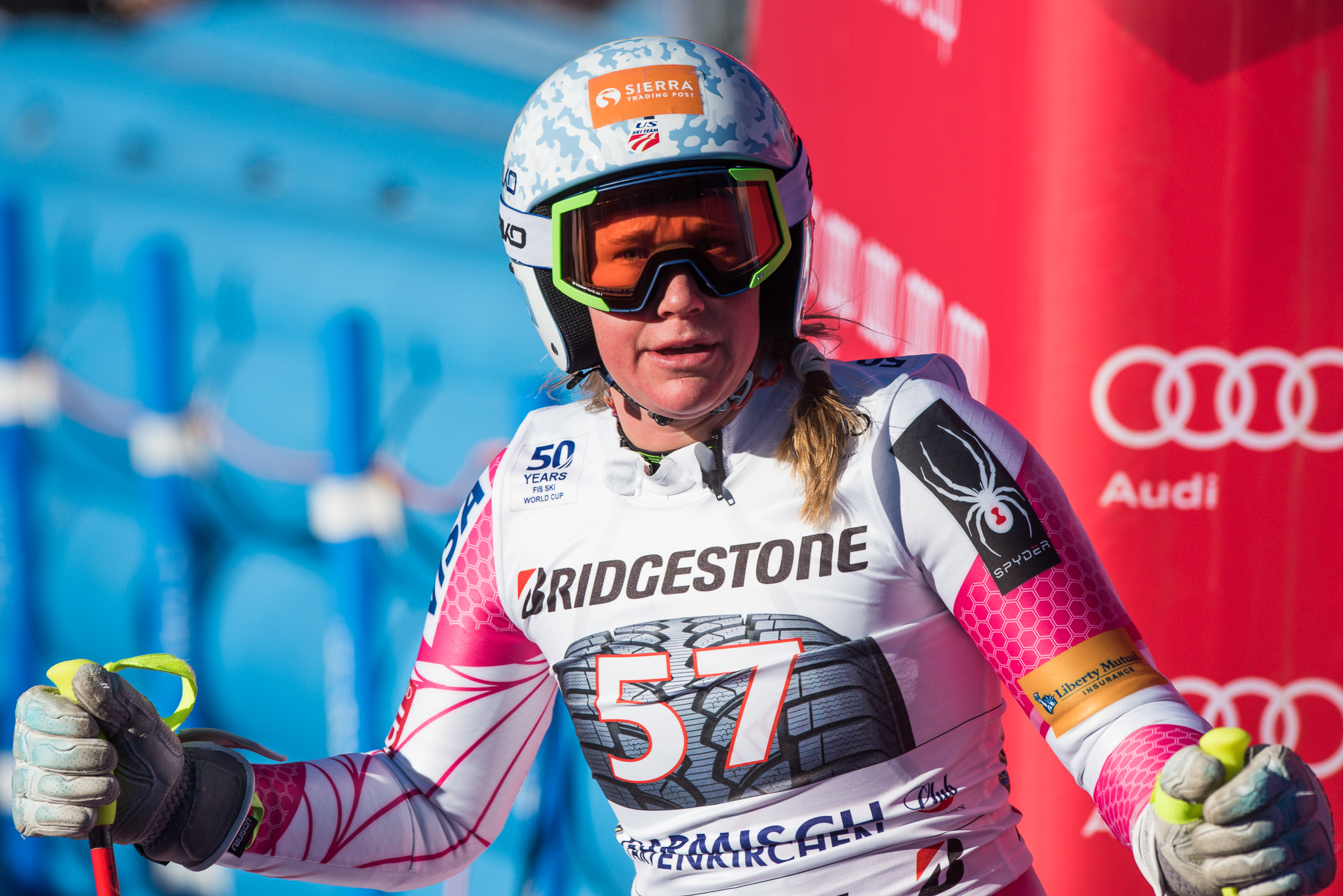
- McKennis in January 2017

Personal information
- Born: August 18, 1989 (age 36) Glenwood Springs, Colorado, U.S.
- Height: 5 ft 6 in (168 cm)
- Website: alicemckennis.com

Skiing career
- Sport: Alpine skiing
- Club: Sunlight Winter SC
- Disciplines: Downhill, Super-G
- World Cup debut: December 5, 2008 (age 19)

Olympics
- Teams: 2 - (2010, 2018)
- Medals: 0

World Championships
- Teams: 1 – (2013)
- Medals: 0

World Cup
- Seasons: 12 – (2009–2018, 2020-2021)
- Wins: 1 – (1 DH)
- Podiums: 2 – (2 DH)
- Overall titles: 0 –(41st in 2013)
- Discipline titles: 0 – (10th in DH, 2013)

Alice McKennis Duran (born August 18, 1989) is a former World Cup alpine ski racer from the United States. She specializes in downhill and Super-G speed events.

Born in Glenwood Springs, Colorado, McKennis grew up on a ranch west of town, near New Castle. She learned to ski and race at nearby Sunlight Ski Area and, after racing for various major clubs in the state, finished at Rowmark Ski Academy in Salt Lake City, Utah. She made her World Cup debut in December 2008, but spent the 2009 season on the Nor-Am circuit.

McKennis was named to the World Cup squad of the U.S. Ski Team for the 2010 season and also made the 2010 Olympic team. She missed most of the 2011 season due to a fracture to her left tibial plateau in early January. McKennis won her first World Cup (and podium) in 2013, a downhill at St. Anton, Austria, on January 12. She suffered a similar tibial plateau injury to her other (right) knee in March at Garmisch-Partenkirchen, Germany.

== World Cup results ==
=== Season standings ===
Season	Age	Overall	Slalom	Giant Slalom	Super-G	Downhill	Combined
2010	20	59	—	—	46	20	—
2011	21	85	—	—	46	32	—
2012	22	61	—	—	—	20	—
2013	23	41	—	—	—	10	—
2014	24	injured					
2015	25	56	—	—	50	23	—
2016	26	66	—	—	52	26	—
2017	27	78	—	—	44	34	—
2018	28	45	—	—	33	18	—
2019	29	injured					
2020	30	65	—	—	33	28	—

=== Race podiums ===
- 1 win – (1 DH)
- 2 podiums – (2 DH)

Season	Date	Location	Discipline	Place
2013	12 Jan 2013	St. Anton, Austria	Downhill	1st
2018	14 Mar 2018	Åre, Sweden	Downhill	3rd

== World Championship results ==
Year	Age	Slalom	Giant Slalom	Super-G	Downhill	Combined
2013	23	—	—	—	17	—

== Olympic results ==
Year	Age	Slalom	Giant Slalom	Super-G	Downhill	Combined
2010	20	—	—	—	DSQ	—
2014	24	Injured				
2018	28	—	—	16	5	—
