= Storm Peak (Colorado) =

Mountain in the state of Colorado

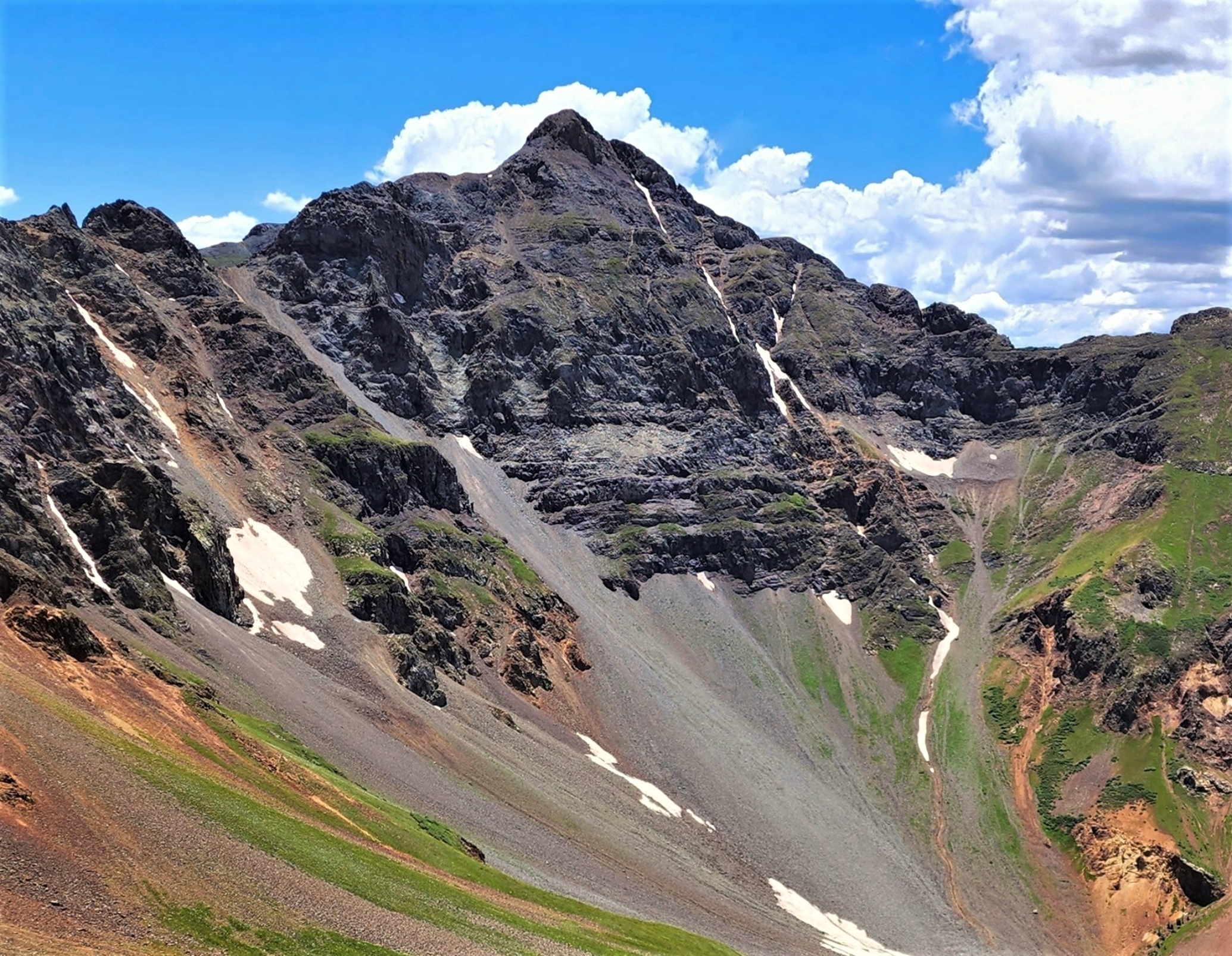
- Northeast aspect

Highest point
- Elevation: 13,495 ft (4,113 m)
- Prominence: 620 ft (189 m)
- Parent peak: Tower Mountain (13,558 ft)
- Isolation: 1.37 mi (2.20 km)
- Coordinates: 37°51′34″N 107°38′51″W

Geography
- Location within Colorado Location within the United States
- Country: United States
- State: Colorado
- County: San Juan
- Parent range: Rocky Mountains; San Juan Mountains
- Topo map: USGS Silverton

Climbing
- Easiest route: class 3 scrambling

Storm Peak is a 13,495-foot-elevation (4,113-meter) summit located in San Juan County, Colorado, United States.

== Description ==
Storm Peak is situated 3.5 miles (5.6 km) north of the town of Silverton on land administered by the Bureau of Land Management. It is set eight miles west of the Continental Divide in the San Juan Mountains which are a subrange of the Rocky Mountains. Precipitation runoff from the mountain drains into tributaries of the Animas River. Topographic relief is significant as the summit rises 3,500 feet (1,100 meters) above Cement Creek in 1.5 mile. The mountain has two unofficially-named subsidiary peaks: East Storm (13,325 feet), and Hancock Peak (13,254 feet). Storm Peak is famous for world-class expert heliskiing and the Silverton Mountain ski area on Storm's north ridge. The International Speed Skiing Championship was held on Storm Mountain in 1982 and 1983. The mountain's toponym has been officially adopted by the United States Board on Geographic Names, and has been recorded in publications since at least 1906.

== Climate ==
According to the Köppen climate classification system, Storm Peak is located in an alpine subarctic climate zone with long, cold, snowy winters, and cool to warm summers. Due to its altitude, it receives precipitation all year, as snow in winter and as thunderstorms in summer, with a dry period in late spring. Climbers can expect afternoon rain, hail, and lightning from the seasonal monsoon in late July and August.

== Gallery ==
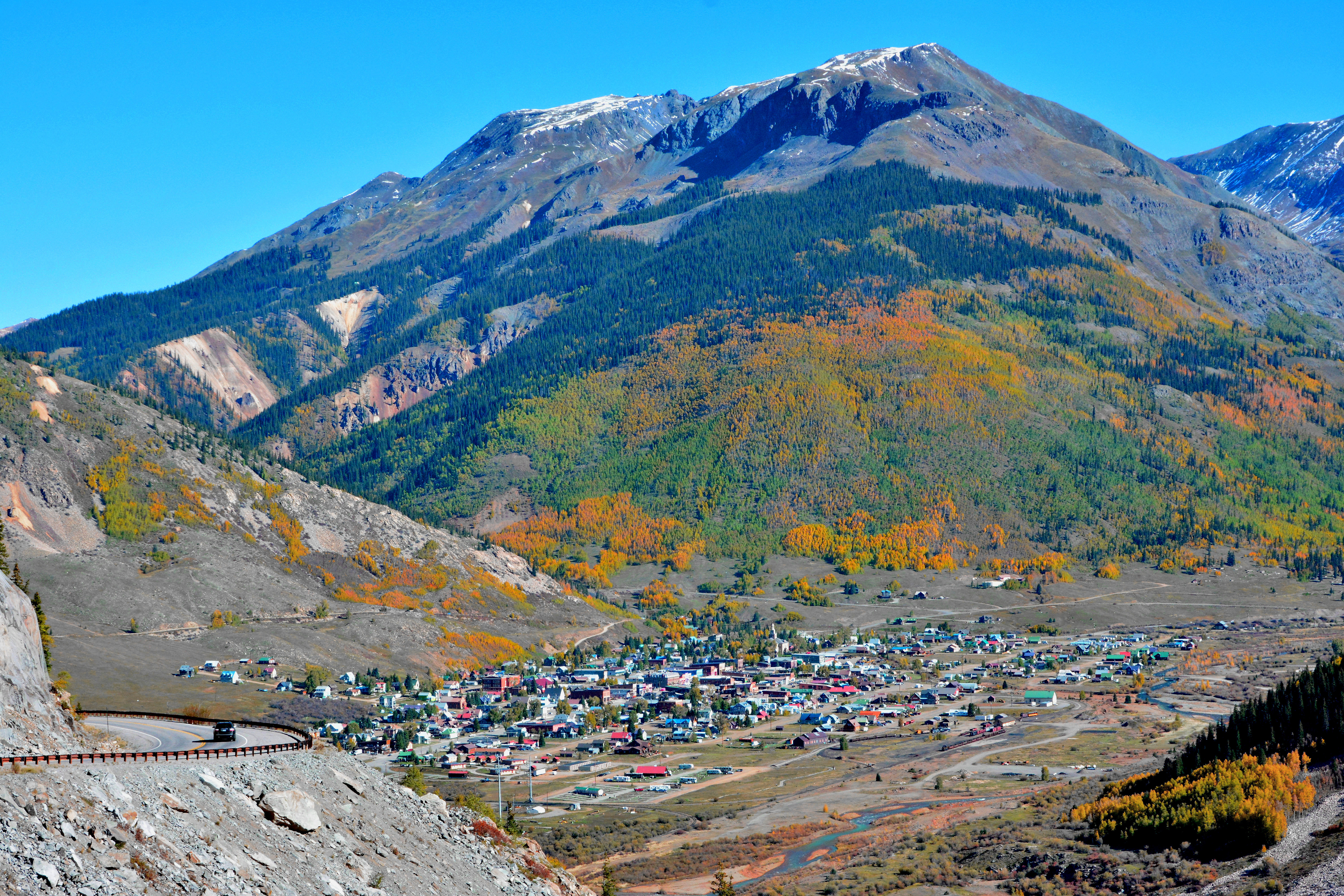
South aspect of Storm Peak/Hancock Peak rises above Silverton.
(summit of Storm not visible)

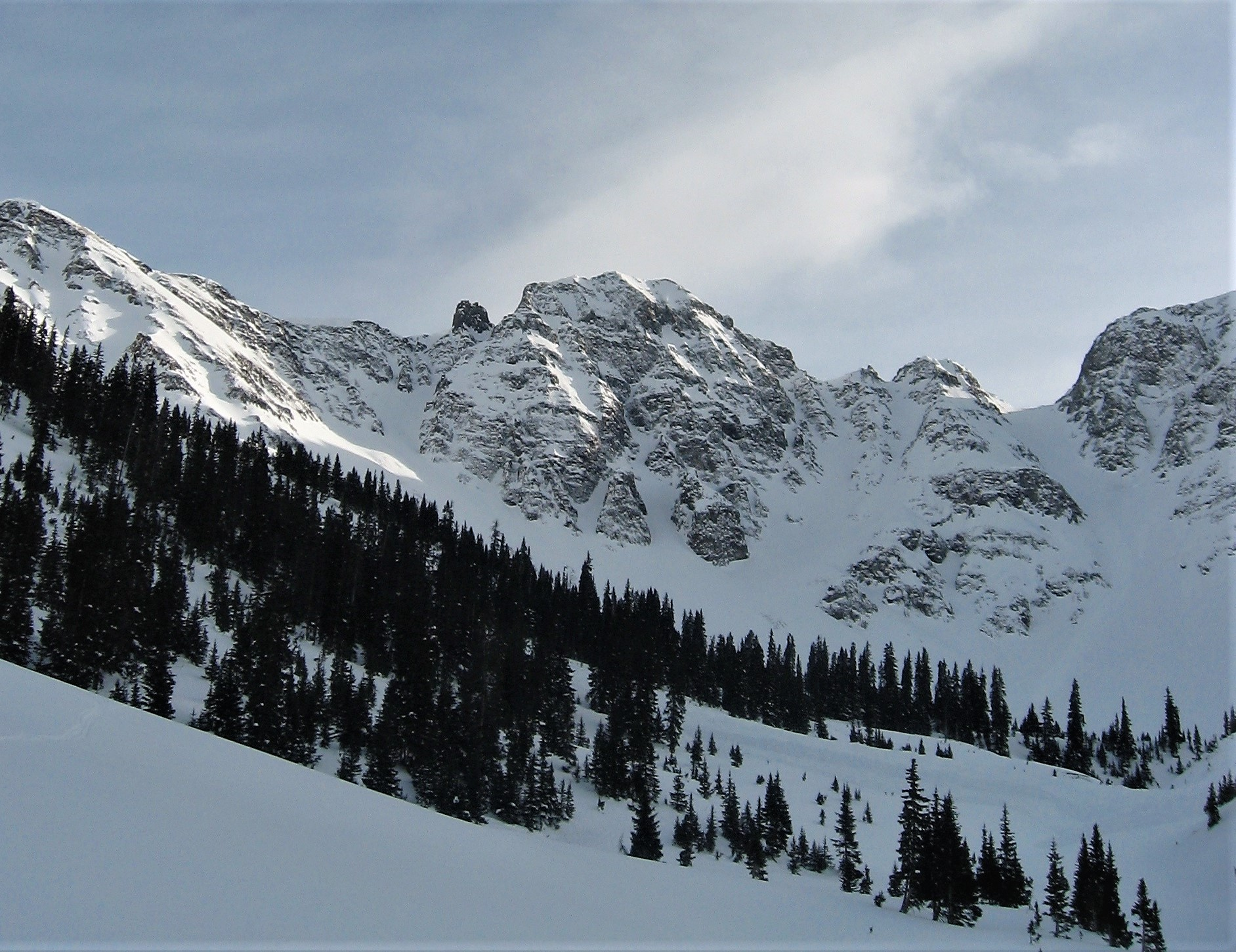
Storm's East Peak viewed from the north in winter

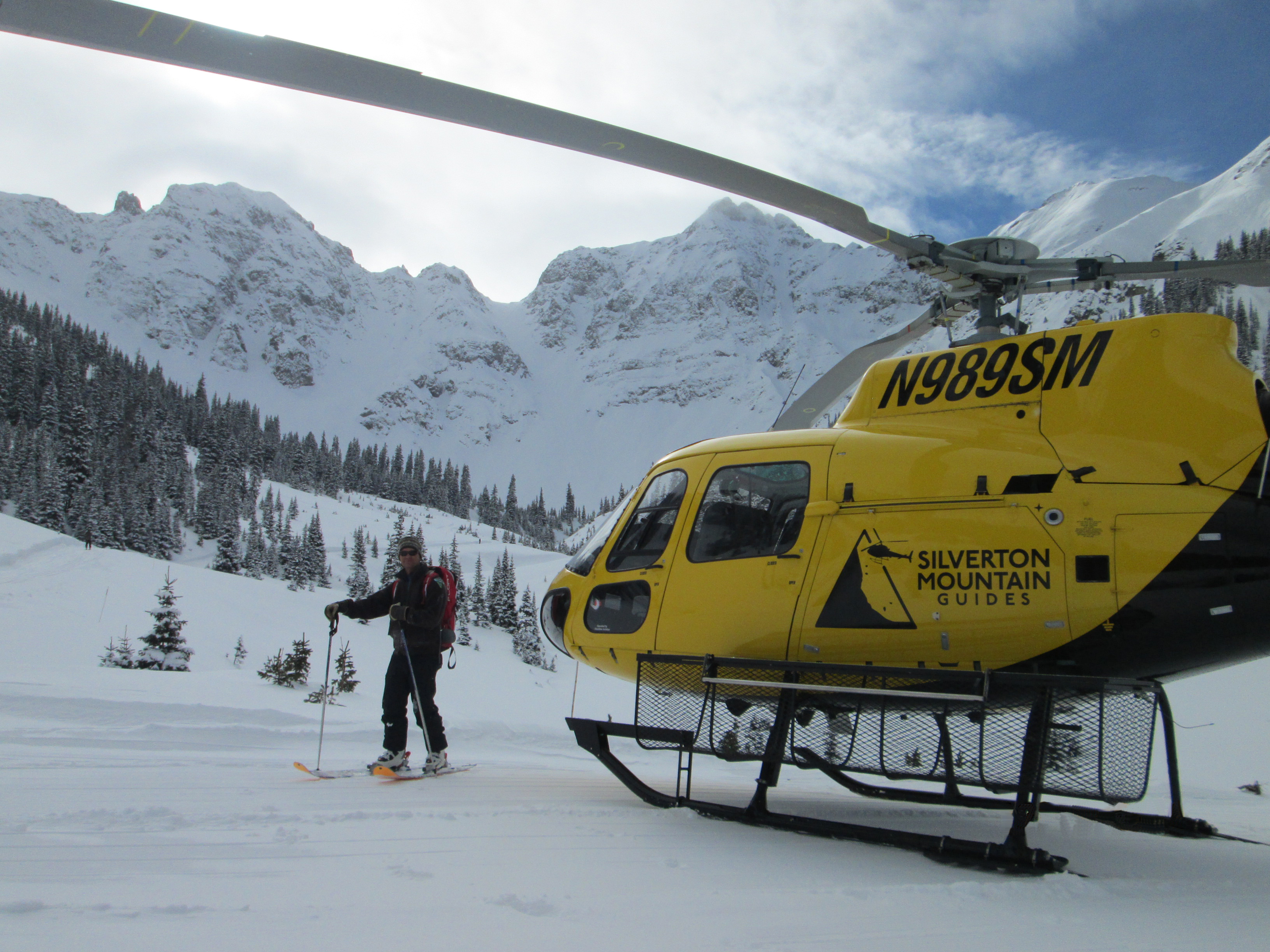
Heliskiing with Storm Peak and East Storm (left) in the background.

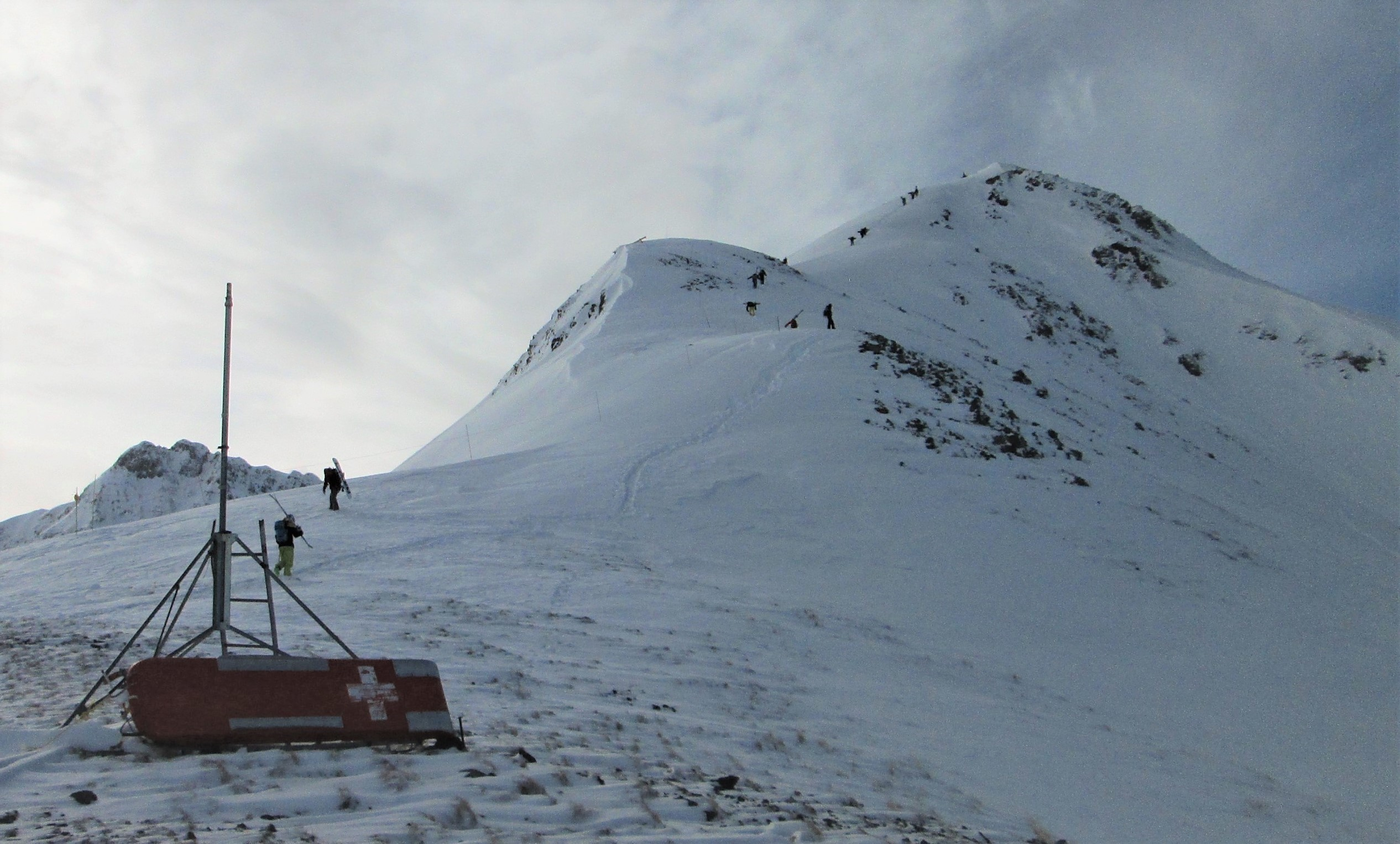
Skiers climbing the north ridge of Storm Peak

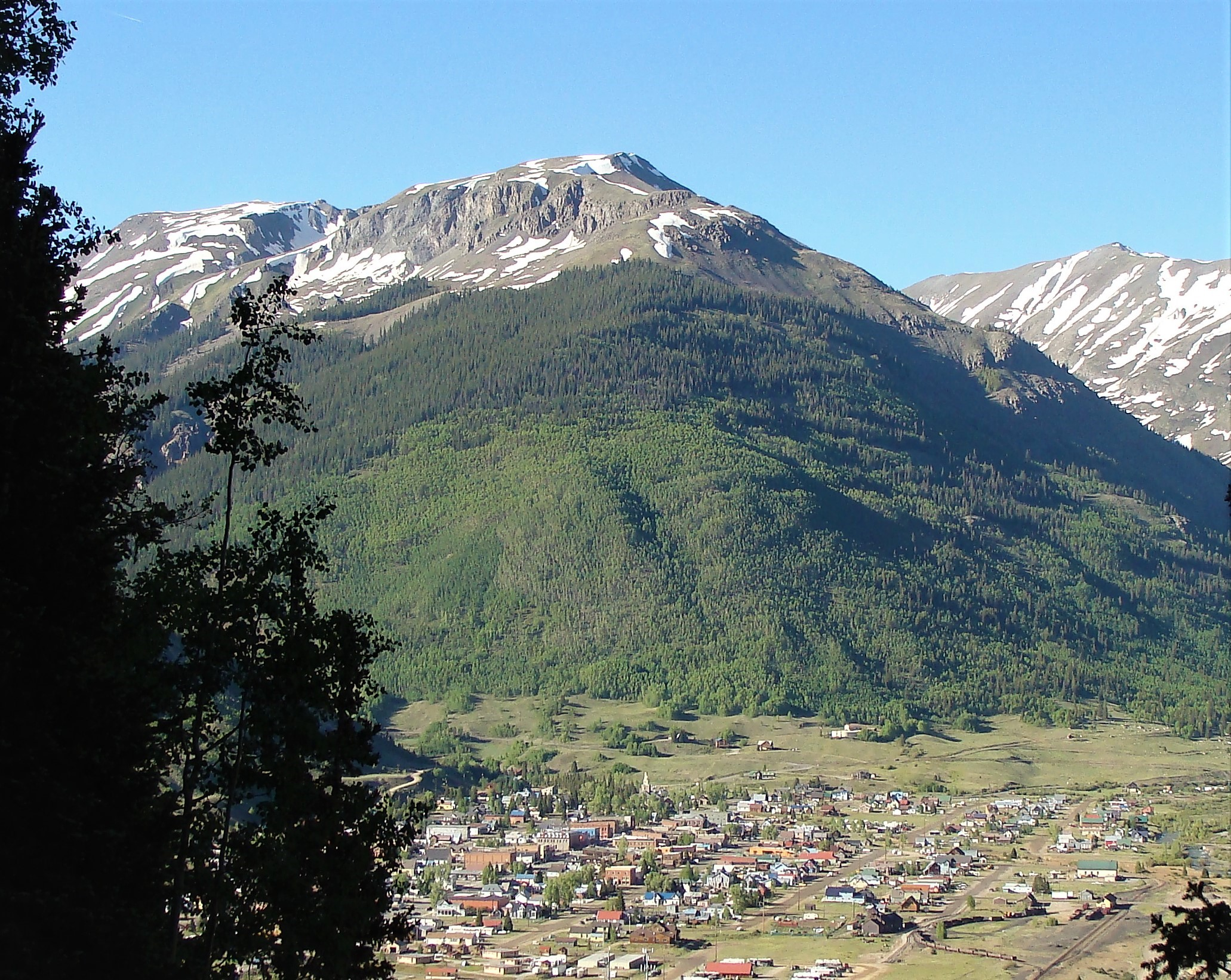
Hancock Peak centered above Silverton, Colorado.
Storm Peak to left, and Tower Mountain to the right.

== See also ==
- Mountains of San Juan County, Colorado
- Thirteener
