= Red McCombs =

American businessman (1927–2023)

- Born: Billy Joe McCombs; October 19, 1927; Spur, Texas, U.S.
- Died: February 19, 2023 (aged 95); San Antonio, Texas, U.S.
- Occupation: Businessman
- Spouse: Charline Hamblin (m. 1950; died 2019)
- Children: 3

Billy Joe "Red" McCombs (October 19, 1927 – February 19, 2023) was an American businessman. He was the founder of the Red McCombs Automotive Group in San Antonio, Texas, a co-founder of Clear Channel Communications, a past chairman of Constellis Group, a onetime owner of the San Antonio Spurs, San Antonio Force, Denver Nuggets, the Minnesota Vikings, and the namesake of the McCombs School of Business at the University of Texas at Austin.

In 2022, Forbes placed the value of McCombs' fortune at $1.7 billion.

== Early life ==
McCombs was born in rural Spur in Dickens County in West Texas, United States. His nickname "Red" came from his hair color. His father was a mechanic who earned $25 per week but tithed through the First Baptist Church of Spur each week. McCombs recalled having seen his parents "share with those who had less, and the joy of giving never ceased to amaze me."

== Career ==
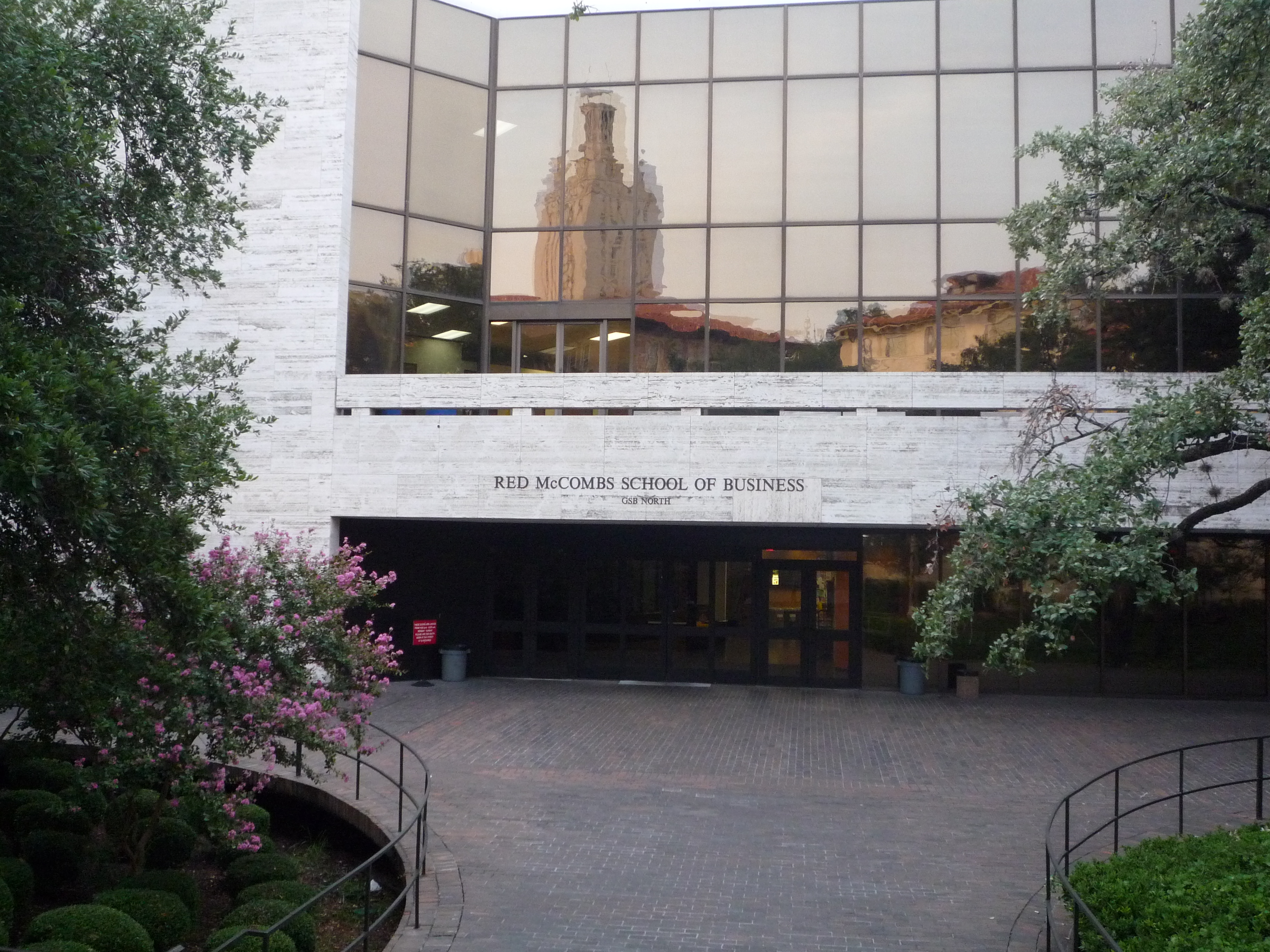
McCombs School of Business

In 1958, McCombs and his fellow salesman, Austin Hemphill, moved to San Antonio to create Hemphill-McCombs Ford, which was the foundation for what ultimately became the Red McCombs Automotive Group. McCombs served as chairman of the trustees at Southwestern University and chairman of the University of Texas's M.D. Anderson Cancer Center in Houston. His particular interest in M.D. Anderson was accentuated in 1986, when he visited a dying friend undergoing treatment there. He expressed how he was overcome by the kindness of every employee he met at the hospital. The workers, he found, had been trained to offer compassion and solace to all who come through the doors. He joined the Anderson board and in 2005 donated $30 million to the hospital. The business school at the University of Texas at Austin was renamed the Red McCombs School of Business in recognition of his $50 million donation to the institution. The $50 million actually yielded $100 million in matching funds for new faculty positions, fellowships, and scholarships.

He was the board chairman of Academi.

In 2017, McCombs filed a $1 million civil suit against seven of his former executives who he alleged took "trade secrets" from McCombs' company to begin a competing firm in Houston, F4 Resources. Defendants in the suit include William "Bill" Forney Jr., who worked with McCombs for forty-four years, former chief financial officer Ricky Halkin, vice president of operations Larry Wyont, vice president of land Charles Forney, and the vice president of geology, Philip Forney. McCombs had established McCombs Energy in Houston in 1998 by merging his 50 percent interest in his partnership with William Forney with other assets purchased from Forney. McCombs claimed that his former associates, however, lowered the proper payout that he was due from his investments. McCombs said that the former executives shattered personal relationships of some four decades.

== Sports ownership ==
McCombs attributed the construction of the HemisFair Arena as the essential development to the success of the San Antonio Spurs. He contacted Lee Iacocca, then president of the Ford Motor Company, to seek funding for the arena to correspond with the 1968 World's Fair. At first, Iacocca offered only $250,000 for the purchase of an art object, and he scolded McCombs and ridiculed San Antonio as "that little old dusty ass town of yours down there [with] no political or economic significance to the Ford Motor Company." McCombs persisted and asked U.S. President Lyndon B. Johnson to contact Henry Ford II, and in a continued heated exchange even told Iacocca that Ford needed to improve the quality of its 1968 vehicles. McCombs located other investors, and the Dallas Chaparrals came to San Antonio five years later in 1973. McCombs realized the importance of television to sports events and saw the opportunity to bring San Antonio to a national stage. Under the McCombs administration, the Spurs had their first superstar in George Gervin, called "The Iceman", who was recruited from the Virginia Squires.

Two years after taking the Spurs into the NBA, McCombs sold off his stake in the Spurs and bought another former ABA team, the Denver Nuggets. He held onto the team from 1978 until 1985, when he sold it to Sidney Shlenker. He then bought the Spurs in 1989 and ran them until he sold them in 1993. In 1998, McCombs bought the Minnesota Vikings for US$250 million. After an unsuccessful attempt to replace the Hubert H. Humphrey Metrodome, McCombs sold the team to new (and current) owner Zygi Wilf before the 2005 NFL season. McCombs was also actively involved in thoroughbred racing and breeding for many years as a major partner in Walmac Farm, a leading American breeding farm, in Lexington, Kentucky].

McCombs was one of the first investors of the Circuit of the Americas. In December 2020 he got his 'own' corner called 'Big Red'.

== Controversy ==
McCombs owned a piece of property surrounded by National Forest near Wolf Creek ski area, a resort in southern Colorado owned by the Pitcher family. McCombs had long wanted to develop a resort community on his property, a plan that has drawn opposition and lawsuits from environmentalists and surrounding communities. McCombs had been unsuccessful in his attempts to convince the court to remove a key roadblock preventing his proposed development. McCombs then attempted to build a 50,000-acre (200 km^{2}) casino resort at Navajo Canyon on Lake Powell. The local Navajo Nation chapters, local government officials, all unanimously rejected the casino proposal and any projects by McCombs.

In 2013, McCombs was found by the United States Supreme Court to have engaged in a sham tax avoidance transaction and was therefore liable for a valuation misstatement penalty.

McCombs severely criticized the 2014 University of Texas hire of Charlie Strong as football coach. He described Strong as "great position coach ... not on a par with other candidates." Three days later he apologized and pledged "total support" for Strong.

== Personal life and death ==
McCombs was a reformed alcoholic, who could "handle his social drinking" until the age of 48, when overcome with convulsions he went into a five-day coma at a medical facility in Houston. McCombs said in a Christmas 2016 interview, "God was good to me and for whatever reason wanted me to live, because I was really dead when I left in 1975 to go to Houston on that medical plane. They told Charline, 'Go ahead and start making arrangements because we are losing him.'" McCombs said that he recovered and never again had a desire for alcohol.

The McCombs Foundation has donated more than $118 million to charity. It is operated by his daughters, who work to keep overhead at a minimum. The foundation makes small donations too, such as $1,000 to Mothers Against Drunk Driving, which are rarely publicized. McCombs had said that he was a large donor to charitable causes because "it makes me feel so good about doing it."

McCombs contributed $40,000 to Donald Trump's 2020 presidential campaign.

McCombs was married to Charline Hamblin from 1950 until her death on December 12, 2019. McCombs died at his home in San Antonio on February 19, 2023, at the age of 95.

On August 29th and 30th, 2026, Vogt Auction Galleries located in San Antonio, Texas hosted a two-day auction for the Estate of Charline and Red McCombs, which featured pieces from the McCombs' iconic home in the Olmos Park neighborhood of central San Antonio, as well as pieces formerly on long-term loan to institutions including the Bexar County Courthouse, San Antonio Academy, and Southwestern University, and includes Western and American artifacts, frontier and early Texas pieces, relics from Spanish missionary sites, historically significant firearms and swords including outstanding Kentucky rifles, saddles and other tack, Native American artifacts, as well as San Antonio Spurs and Minnesota Vikings collectibles, personal items including Red's cowboy boots and hats, jewelry, and fine art, important silver, antiques, rugs, and decorative arts from the home.

== Awards and honors ==
- Texas Treasure Business Award for providing employment to Texas citizens
- Distinguished Alumnus of The University of Texas at Austin, Longhorn of the Year and the Southwestern University Distinguished Alumnus Award
- San Antonio Citizenship Award and induction into San Antonio Business, Texas, Texas Philanthropy, and San Antonio Sports Halls of Fame
- Minnesota Business and Opportunities Magazine Man of the Year
- Texas Business Hall of Fame in 1998
- Golden Plate Award of the American Academy of Achievement in 1999. His award was presented by Awards Council member Lowry Mays.
- National Football Foundation and College Hall of Fame Gold Medal in 2001

== See also ==
- Red McCombs Media
