= Echo Mountain (ski area) =

Ski resort in Colorado, United States

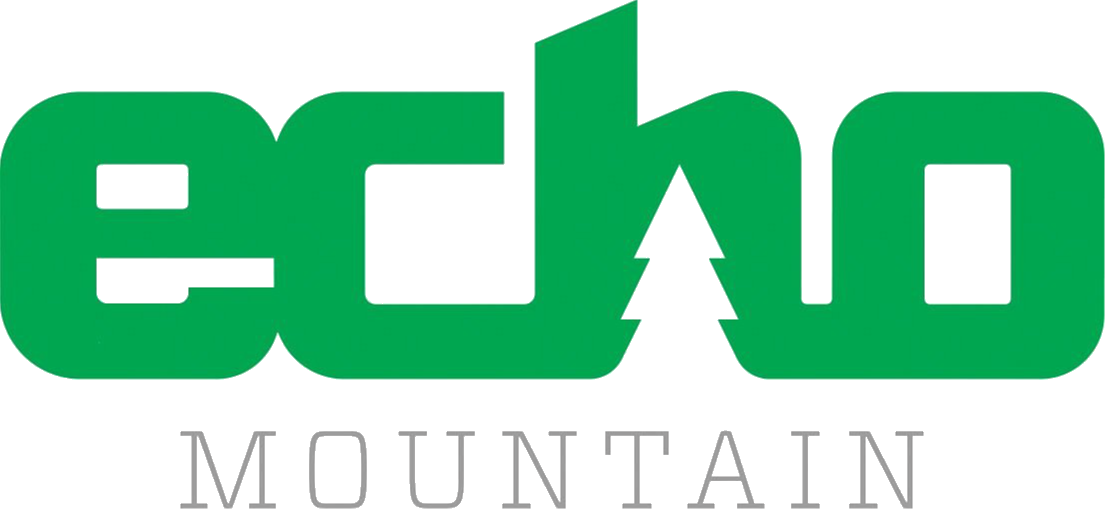

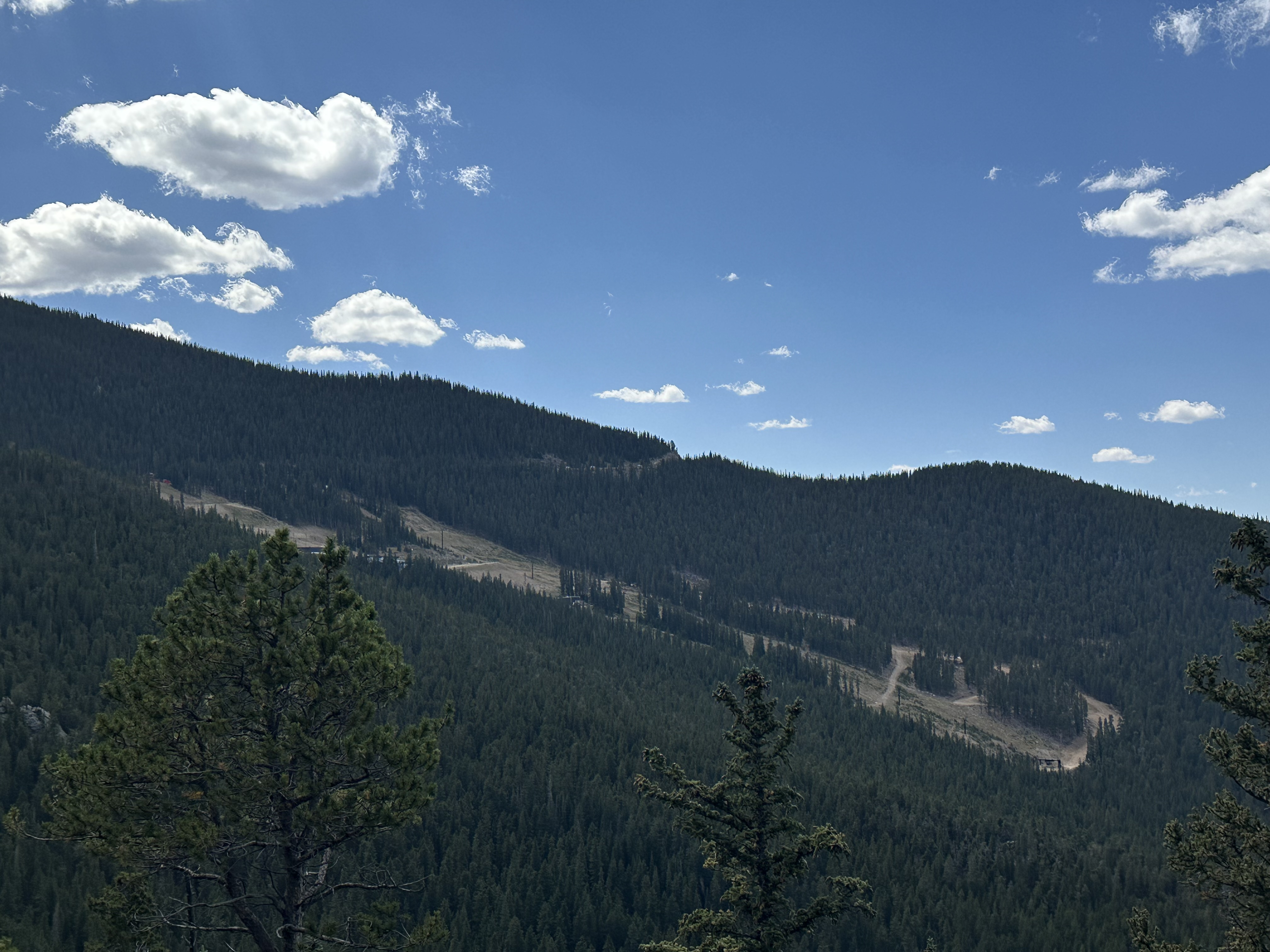
- Echo Mountain ski runs, late Summer 2024

- Location in Colorado Echo Mountain (the United States)
- Location: Clear Creek County, Colorado, United States
- Nearest city: Evergreen, Colorado
- Coordinates: 39°41′6″N 105°31′10″W
- Vertical: 600 ft (180 m)
- Top elevation: 10,650 ft (3,250 m)
- Base elevation: 10,050 ft (3,060 m)
- Skiable area: 226+ acres
- Trails: 13 total: 3 easiest; 6 more difficult; 4 most difficult
- Longest run: Pops (0.4 mi)
- Lift system: 3 (1 triple chair, 2 covered conveyor lifts)
- Snowfall: 275 in/year
- Snowmaking: 50 acres (200,000 m^{2})
- Night skiing: 100% lit
- Website: echomtn.com

Echo Mountain is a ski, snowboard and tubing area located in Clear Creek County, west of Evergreen, Colorado. It is the closest ski area to the Denver metro area.

== Description ==
Echo Mountain is located at the former site of the Squaw Pass Ski Area. Echo opened late in the 2006 season as a terrain park-only concept. The area began to shift its focus away from terrain-park only and sold at auction in 2012. The new owner turned the ski area into a private ski racing training facility. After several seasons under this concept, the owner filed for bankruptcy in January 2016. The area sold in the fall of 2016 to a company looking to open to the public and appeal to a broader base of snow sports enthusiasts. It is fully lit to offer night skiing. There are roughly 60 acres of skiable terrain and is located within the Arapaho National Forest and sits on the North face of Chief Mountain (elv. 11,709 ft.).

The area was created out of lodgepole pines, bristlecone pines, and Douglas firs. The base of the mountain is located at 10,050 feet (3,060 m) and the summit is at about 10,650 feet (3,250 m).

== Change of Ownership ==
Echo Mountain was formerly owned by Jerry Petitt and his family. After buying the property in 2002 Petitt revived the ski area. The hill was originally designed and marketed as a terrain park for younger skiers and snowboarders. In the Summer of 2012, Echo Mountain Park was bought by Nora Pykkonen. Pykkonen operated Front Range Ski Club, an alpine ski racing facility, out of Echo. Both parties seemed excited about how Echo will change, "I think this will be a very interesting opportunity for them and hopefully in a few years we will hear about an Olympic skier that came out of Echo." said Petitt. The auction sale was operated by Sheldon Good & Co. In January 2016, Echo Mountain filed for bankruptcy after falling behind on loan payments. In the fall of 2016, the mountain was sold to a new owner in a deal that included all the land, facilities, equipment, snow cats and the chairlift.

== Lifts ==
Echo's Yan Triple chairlift was purchased from Vail Resorts' Heavenly Resort and installed in 2005. The triple, named Hot Laps Special, is situated to serve the entire mountain. The second lift is a new covered conveyor lift by RMCE and was installed in 2017. The third lift is also a new covered conveyor lift by RMCE and was installed in 2019.
