= Purgatory Resort =

Ski resort in Southwest Colorado

Purgatory

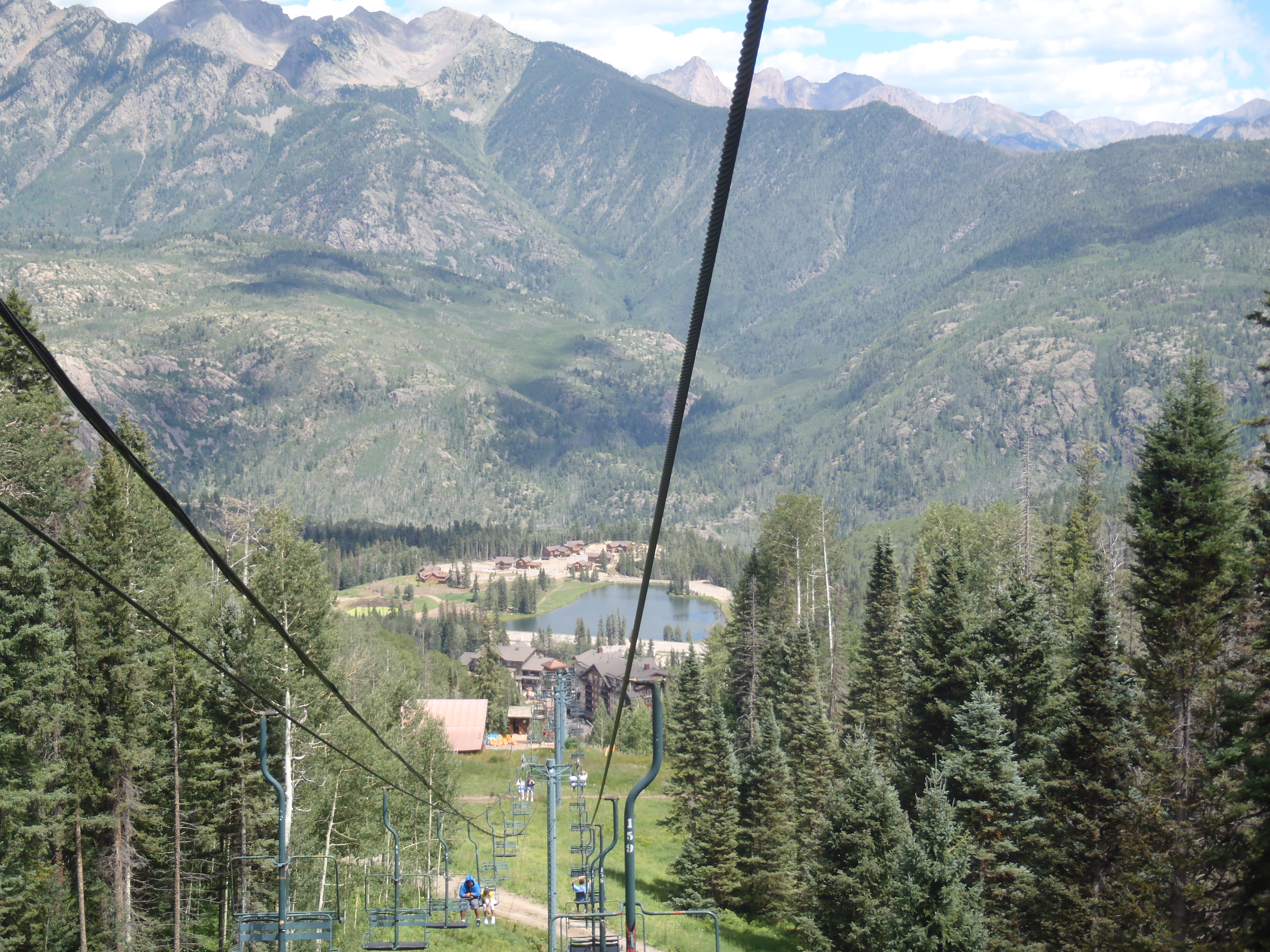
- A view of the resort from the chairlift in the summer in 2011

- Location in Colorado Purgatory (the United States)
- Location: La Plata County, Colorado, United States
- Nearest city: Durango, Colorado
- Coordinates: 37°37′47″N 107°48′52″W
- Vertical: 2,029 ft (618 m)
- Top elevation: 10,822 ft (3,299 m)
- Base elevation: 8,793 ft (2,680 m)
- Skiable area: 1,650 acres (6.7 km^{2})
- Trails: 105 total 22% beginner 35% intermediate 43% advanced
- Longest run: 1.3 mi (2.1 km)
- Lift system: 12 lifts: 1 high-speed six-person chairlift, 2 high-speed quad chairs, 3 triple chairs, 3 double chairs, 3 surface lifts
- Lift capacity: 15,000+ skiers/hr
- Terrain parks: 6
- Snowfall: 260 inches
- Snowmaking: 21%
- Website: purgatory.ski

Purgatory Resort is a ski resort located in the San Juan Mountains of Southwest Colorado, 25 miles (42 km) north of the town of Durango. Established in 1965, Purgatory offers 105 trails, including 5 terrain parks, over 1,500 skiable acres, and 12 lifts, including one six-person and two high speed quad lifts. Average annual snowfall is 260 inches per year, and artificial snow is produced on approximately one-fifth of the mountain. The elevation at the summit is 10,822 feet (3,299 m), with a vertical drop of 2,029 feet (618 m).

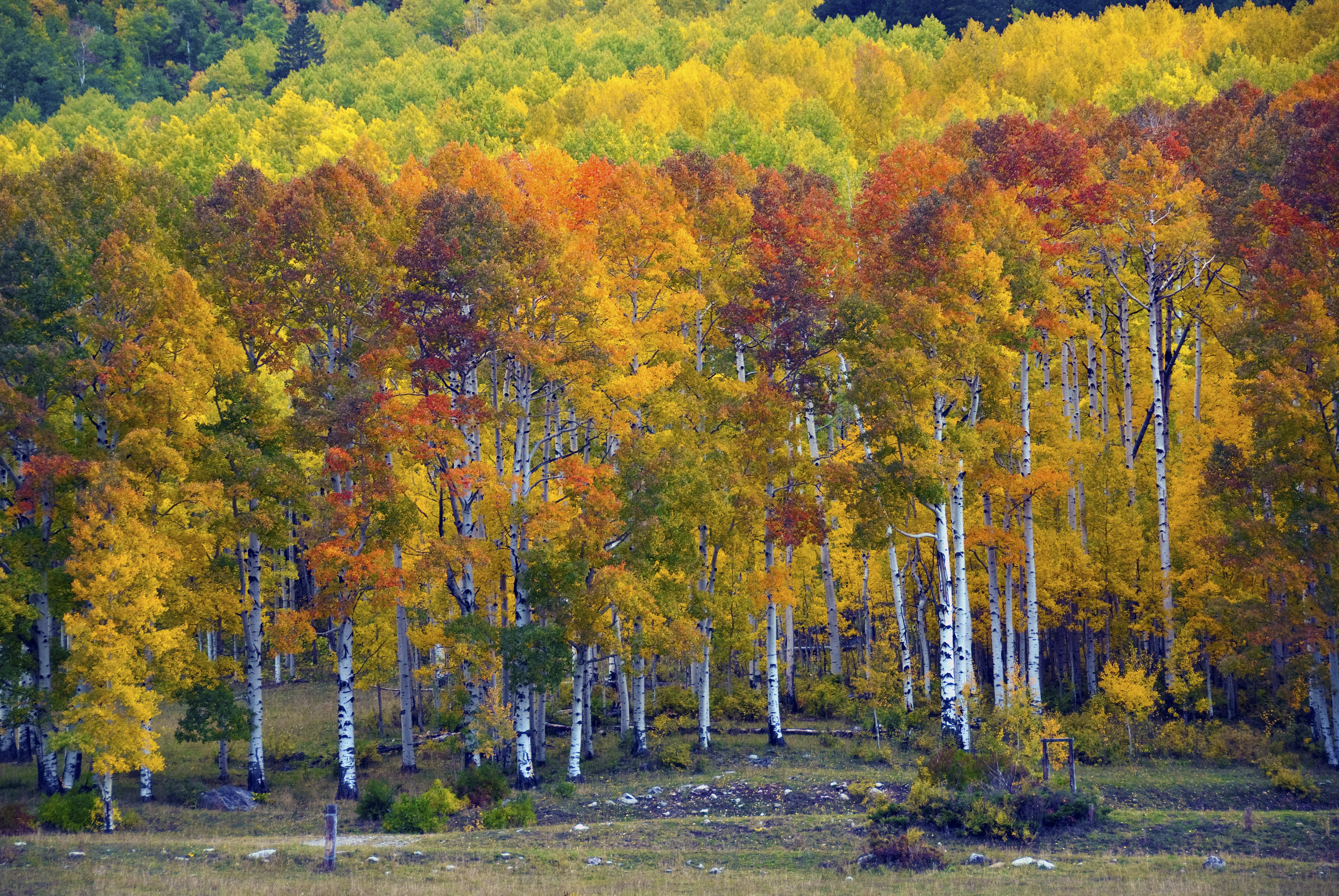
Aspens at Sunset, Purgatory

== Facilities ==
Facilities at the resort include condos that are rented out by their owners to vacationing tourists, a nightclub/bar at the bottom of the ski slopes by the chair lifts, a shuttle that goes back and forth from the resort to the nearby town of Durango, and a ski school with "bunny slopes". One of the more unusual features of the resort is an urgent care clinic, staffed by midlevel health care providers from the nearby town of Durango, Colorado. The on-site urgent care clinic is available anytime the slopes are open, and treats mostly ski related injuries. The Purgatory ski patrol takes injured skiers off the mountain directly to the clinic, expediting treatment and eliminating the need for patients to wait for an ambulance to respond from nearby Durango, Colorado.

== History ==
Purgatory was founded in 1965 by United States Forest Service ranger Chester "Chet" Anderson and oilman Ray Duncan. In 2000, the resort was sold to Chuck Cobb and Gary Engle, who changed the name to Durango Mountain Resort. In 2015 the resort was sold to James Coleman, who restored the original name.

Purgatory is named for Purgatory Creek, which flows through the base area. Because of this, many of the trails at the resort have names inspired by Christianity (such as Angel's Tread and Demon) but other belief systems are also represented (Styx, Nirvana.) Other trails such as Chet's and Ray's Ridge were named after founders Anderson and Duncan.

== Climate ==
Cascade and Rockwood 6.9 NNW are weather stations located near Purgatory Resort. Purgatory Resort has a humid continental climate (Köppen Dfb), closely bordering on a subalpine climate (Köppen Dfc).

Climate data for Cascade, Colorado, 1991–2020 normals, 1986-2020 extremes: 8880ft (2707m)
Month	Jan	Feb	Mar	Apr	May	Jun	Jul	Aug	Sep	Oct	Nov	Dec	Year
Record high °F (°C)	61 (16)	65 (18)	74 (23)	74 (23)	86 (30)	90 (32)	95 (35)	89 (32)	97 (36)	82 (28)	80 (27)	61 (16)	97 (36)
Mean maximum °F (°C)	54.5 (12.5)	55.7 (13.2)	62.3 (16.8)	65.9 (18.8)	74.0 (23.3)	82.1 (27.8)	85.8 (29.9)	82.1 (27.8)	79.3 (26.3)	71.0 (21.7)	62.0 (16.7)	54.6 (12.6)	86.7 (30.4)
Mean daily maximum °F (°C)	40.9 (4.9)	42.5 (5.8)	48.9 (9.4)	52.4 (11.3)	61.2 (16.2)	71.5 (21.9)	76.4 (24.7)	73.4 (23.0)	67.4 (19.7)	58.2 (14.6)	47.2 (8.4)	40.0 (4.4)	56.7 (13.7)
Daily mean °F (°C)	27.0 (−2.8)	28.4 (−2.0)	34.4 (1.3)	38.7 (3.7)	46.1 (7.8)	54.2 (12.3)	60.0 (15.6)	58.6 (14.8)	52.5 (11.4)	44.2 (6.8)	33.8 (1.0)	26.6 (−3.0)	42.0 (5.6)
Mean daily minimum °F (°C)	12.9 (−10.6)	14.5 (−9.7)	20.1 (−6.6)	25.1 (−3.8)	31.0 (−0.6)	37.2 (2.9)	43.9 (6.6)	44.0 (6.7)	37.7 (3.2)	30.3 (−0.9)	20.5 (−6.4)	13.2 (−10.4)	27.5 (−2.5)
Mean minimum °F (°C)	−3.8 (−19.9)	−1.1 (−18.4)	5.1 (−14.9)	12.4 (−10.9)	20.6 (−6.3)	26.8 (−2.9)	36.4 (2.4)	37.5 (3.1)	27.5 (−2.5)	17.3 (−8.2)	2.6 (−16.3)	−5.0 (−20.6)	−7.3 (−21.8)
Record low °F (°C)	−16 (−27)	−14 (−26)	−9 (−23)	−6 (−21)	6 (−14)	6 (−14)	18 (−8)	19 (−7)	6 (−14)	5 (−15)	−6 (−21)	−22 (−30)	−22 (−30)
Average precipitation inches (mm)	3.37 (86)	3.43 (87)	2.83 (72)	2.21 (56)	1.92 (49)	0.95 (24)	2.45 (62)	3.12 (79)	2.93 (74)	2.84 (72)	2.89 (73)	3.29 (84)	32.23 (818)
Average snowfall inches (cm)	41.7 (106)	45.8 (116)	33.8 (86)	9.7 (25)	10.8 (27)	0.1 (0.25)	0.0 (0.0)	0.0 (0.0)	0.5 (1.3)	4.1 (10)	19.7 (50)	54.1 (137)	220.3 (558.55)
Source 1: XMACIS2 (Cascade normals & Rockwood 6.9 2015-2022 snowfall)
Source 2: NOAA (Precipitation)
