= Hesperus Ski Area =

Ski area in Colorado, United States

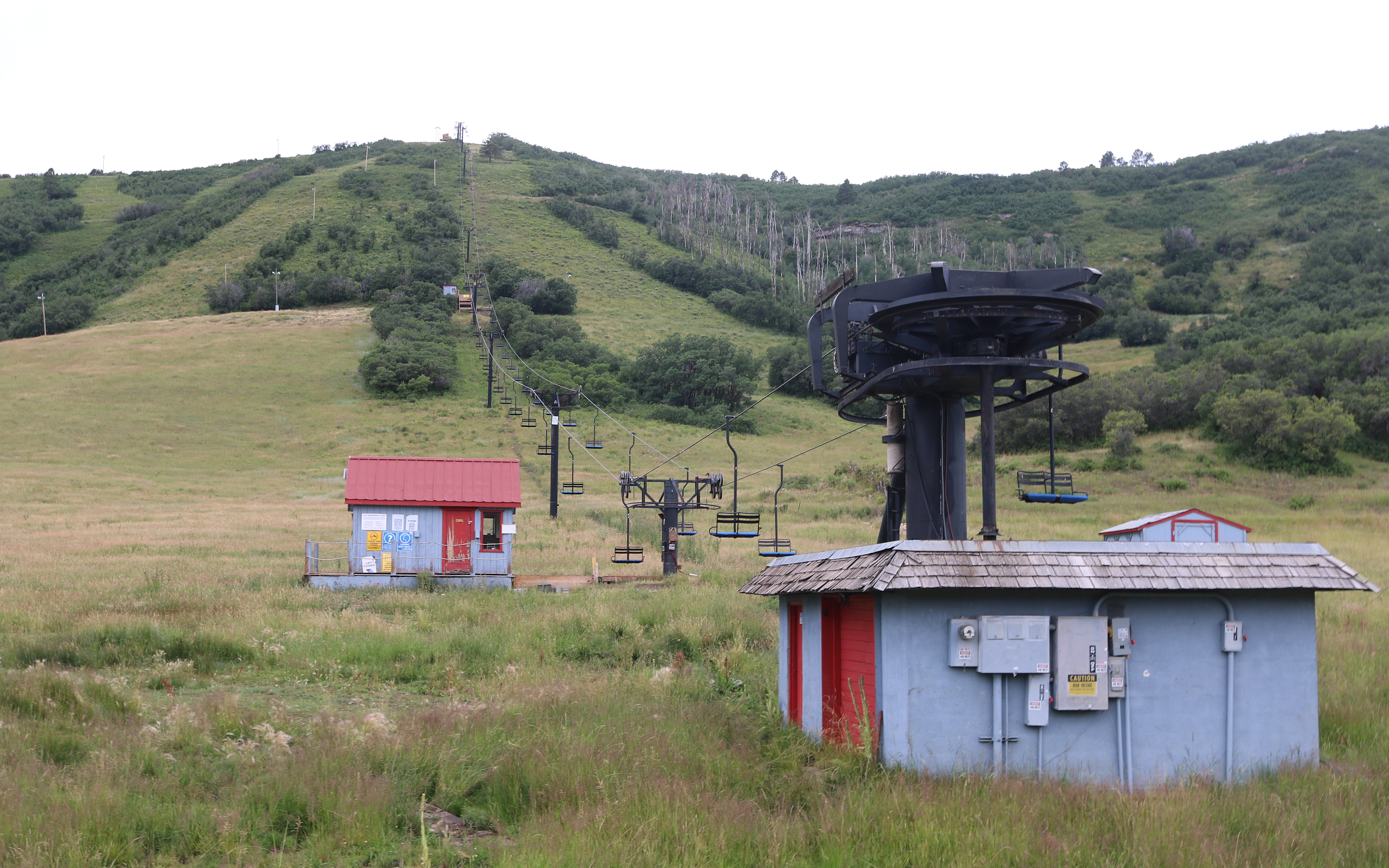
- The ski area in summer in 2019

- Location in Colorado Hesperus Ski Area (the United States)
- Location: Hesperus; La Plata County, Colorado
- Nearest city: Durango: 11 mi (18 km)
- Coordinates: 37°17′52″N 108°03′18″W
- Vertical: >700 ft (210 m)
- Top elevation: 8,888 ft (2,709 m)
- Base elevation: 8,200 ft (2,500 m)
- Skiable area: 60 acres (0.2 km^{2})
- Trails: 26 – 30% easiest – 20% more difficult – 50% experts only
- Lift system: 1 double chair
- Snowfall: 150 inches (380 cm)
- Night skiing: Yes
- Website: ski-hesperus.com

The Hesperus Ski Area is located near the town of Hesperus, Colorado, which is in the south west part of the state. It is off of U.S. Highway 160 just west of the town of the same name.

== Description ==
Ski Hesperus has 13 runs, of which 30% are beginner difficulty, 20% are intermediate and 50% are of expert difficulty. The summit elevation is 8,880 feet, the base elevation is 8,200 feet and the vertical drop is 680 feet. It features one rope tow (which has been closed for many years) and one double chair lift. There is also a full service snack bar, ski and snowboard rentals, ski and snowboard lessons and a tubing hill.

== History ==
Ski Hesperus opened in 1962. It has operated off and on over the years, and was open every season from 2006 to 2023. On December 27, 2023, Ski Hesperus announced its closure for the remainder of the 2023–24 season due to a mechanical issue with their sole double chair lift. On March 12, 2024, it was announced that the mountain would remain closed for the 2024–25 season.
