= Sunlight Ski Area =

Ski area in Colorado, United States

Sunlight Mountain Resort

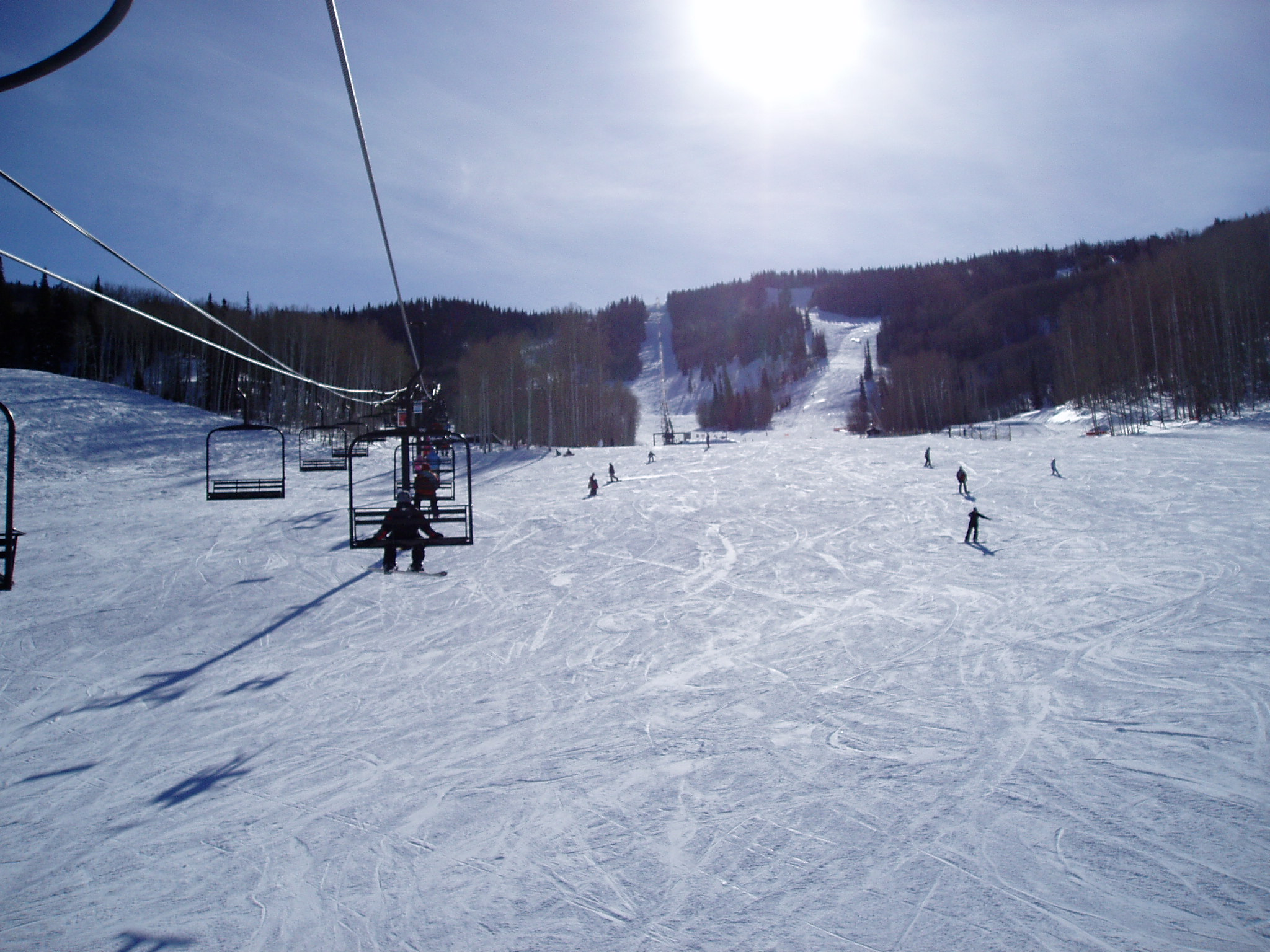
- Sunlight Ski Area in 2008

- Location in Colorado Sunlight Mountain Resort (the United States)
- Location: White River National Forest, Garfield County, Colorado, U.S.
- Nearest city: Glenwood Springs: 12 miles (20 km)
- Coordinates: 39°23′59.3″N 107°20′21.4″W
- Vertical: 2,010 feet (613 m)
- Top elevation: 9,895 feet (3,016 m)
- Base elevation: 7,885 feet (2,403 m)
- Skiable area: 680 acres (2.8 km^{2})
- Trails: 67 total: 20% beginner; 55% intermediate; 20% advanced; 5% expert
- Longest run: 2.5 miles (4.0 km)
- Lift system: 3 chairlifts: (1 triple, 2 double)
- Terrain parks: 1
- Snowfall: 250 in (635 cm)
- Night skiing: None
- Website: sunlightmtn.com

Sunlight Mountain Resort and Ski Area is a ski area in Colorado, located in Garfield County in the White River National Forest, south of nearby Glenwood Springs.

== Description ==
The resort has variety of terrain encompassing easy beginner runs, cruiser runs, as well as a section of steep chutes. The area covers a northeast-facing below-tree line basin that funnels all runs toward a single base area. The area has three chairlifts and a vertical drop exceeding 2,010 feet (610 m). Operations began in December 1966 with one chairlift and a second was added in 1973. The summit of the park area has views of Mount Sopris and the Elk Mountains.

== Notable people ==
- Alice McKennis (b. 1989), World Cup racer in speed events and two-time Olympian from New Castle, Colorado, learned to ski at Sunlight at the age of two. On March 31, 2018, Sunlight dedicated Alligator Alleys, a series of three steep chutes on its East Ridge, in honor of McKennis.
