= Kendall Mountain Ski Area =

Ski area in Colorado, United States

Coordinates: 37°48′41″N 107°39′23″W

Kendall Mountain is a small ski area located at the town of Silverton, Colorado. It was developed by the Grand Imperial Hotel in the 1950s and opened for business in the early 1960s. In 1983, the area was found to be operating without a permit and remained closed until the late 1990s. It advertises itself as "the cheapest ski area in the West." The area has run with a single 950-foot (290 m) tow rope for most of its operation but upgraded to a double chairlift in 2006, purchased from the Quechee Ski Area in Vermont. Kendall Mountain's base elevation is 9,300 feet (2,800 m) and has 35 acres (140,000 m^{2}) of skiable terrain in 11 runs.

Research since 2017 by the town of Silverton determined that the area has viable terrain for expansion of the ski area, as well as potential for amenities like Nordic skiing trails, and night skiing, as well as summer recreation activities.
