= Wolf Creek ski area =

Ski area in Colorado, United States

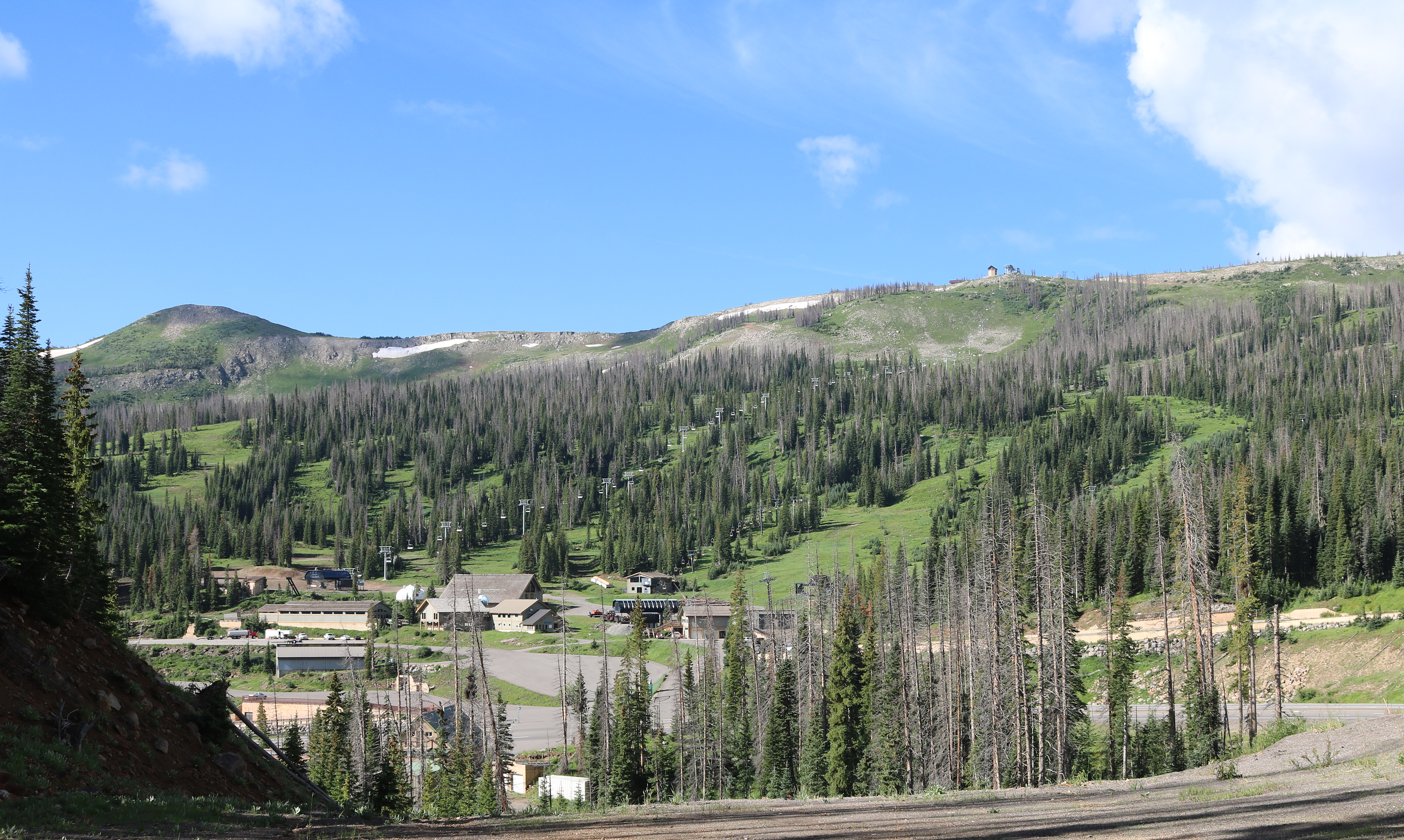
- The ski area in summer, 2019

- Location in Colorado Wolf Creek ski area (the United States)
- Location: Mineral County, Colorado, USA
- Nearest city: Pagosa Springs, Colorado
- Coordinates: 37°28′20″N 106°47′36″W
- Top elevation: 11,904 feet (3,628 m)
- Base elevation: 10,300 feet (3,100 m)
- Skiable area: 1,600 acres (6.5 km^{2})
- Trails: 77; 20% Beginner; 35% Intermediate; 25% Advanced; 20% Expert
- Longest run: Navajo Trail - 2 mi (3.2 km)
- Lift system: 11 total (3 High-Speed Quad, 2 Quad chairs, 2 Triple chairs, 2 Double chair, 2 surface lifts
- Snowfall: 430 in/year (10.9 m/year)
- Website: wolfcreekski.com

Wolf Creek Ski Area (WCSA) is a ski area in southwest Colorado, located on the Wolf Creek Pass between Pagosa Springs and South Fork. It is best known for receiving more average annual snowfall than any other resort in Colorado, at about 430 inches per year.

== History ==
=== First site on top of the pass ===
During the 1930s, people were taming the mountains of Colorado by building highways and mountain passes. US Highway 160 was constructed as a new project connecting the San Luis Valley to Pagosa Springs. Prior to 1936, Cumbres Pass was the only direct route through the mountains in this area, and during heavy snowstorms it often closed. The construction project between San Luis and Pagosa Springs was dubbed Wolf Creek Pass. By 1938, construction on Highway 160 over the pass was complete. That same year, a group of budding skiers from the San Luis Valley, including a farmer named Kelly Boyce, created the Wolf Creek Ski Club and installed a rope tow on the north side near the summit of Wolf Creek Pass. Kelly's lift was driven by an old Chevy truck with tickets at $1 per day. Charles Elliott, who helped Boyce launch skiing at Wolf Creek Pass, grew up in the San Luis Valley and taught himself to ski on homemade boards at age 21, hiking up Wolf Creek Pass in 1934. With the help of four separate ski clubs on both sides of the pass—in the San Luis Valley to the east and Pagosa Springs to the west—Kelley and Elliott built the first rope tow and organized a ski patrol in 1936. The following year the four clubs unified into Wolf Creek Ski Club, and over the next five years Elliott led the construction of shelter cabins and additional rope tows. At the outset of WW II, at least three of the individuals active in the development of Wolf Creek Pass as a ski area served as members of the 10th mountain Division, Charles Elliot, Dick Long and Bob Wright. {}

The inspired bunch of volunteers (and they were all volunteers) who built the first ski runs at Wolf Creek were a hearty bunch who loved skiing and the mountains. But finally, following the end of WW II, the hardy skiers of the Wolf Creek Ski Club grew bored with the 150-yard rope tow on the base of Thunder Mountain and began to look around for options. In 1955, Edward Sharp and Ronald Major, skiers from Monte Vista, were discussing possible ski lifts and locations for a new ski area.

=== Present site south of the continental divide ===
In the Journal, The San Luis Valley Historian the author records an interview with W. Edward Sharp, "Late in the summer..(1954)..I was at the Chuck Wagon Dinner the night before the Stampede Rodeo..(in Monte Vista). I was talking to Ronald Major, a fellow member of the Wolf Creek Ski Club. He said he had just gotten some information on a Poma Lift manufactured in France. It was similar to a T-bar tow. He thought we could buy one for $10,000, about half the cost for a T-bar. If we could finance it, we ought to buy one for Wolf Creek. Ronald Major was a member of the Ski Club, probably since its inception in 1935. He, like many others, spent his Sunday afternoons skiing at the top of Wolf Creek Pass. Several of the good skiers, Kelly and Dick Boyce, Bob Wilkinson, Dick Long and Bob Wright didn't like riding the rope tow they had.... (Many) had learned to ski while in the 10th Mountain Division during World War II.

So, we got together some other members of the Ski Club and talked about it. They were enthusiastic about the possibilities. We decided we could form a nonprofit corporation and sell bonds to raise the $20,000 necessary to put in this lift. We'd pay off the bonds out of income from the ski area. That fall we appeared before the Chambers of Commerce of Monte Vista, Alamosa, Del Norte, South Fork, and Pagosa Springs and told our story of the need for the new lift.

While doing this organizational work during ski season, a committee of the best skiers in the Ski Club decided we ought to relocate the ski area. They found..(an area)..a little way down the road, on the east side of the Continental Divide. This location was larger and, over time, could be developed into a more diverse ski area. We estimated the tow lines would be much longer than the old site, making the cost about $15,000, it seemed ideal for what we wanted, so we applied to the Forest Service for a permit to use it. After many meetings with the Chambers of Commerce and other committees, we formed a corporation of 1000 shares at $25 a share for a total of $25,000...We spent the winter of 1954-55 talking up the new lift, making plans for the new area, forming the corporation, raising the money, getting Forest Service permits, and so forth. All along we met good response from businessmen, skiers, and the Forest Service."

In 1956, the corporation elected Ed Sharp as permanent president and continued to operate the area as a public corporation.

In early December that year, they reached a turning point, only to be "snowed out," acquiescing to using the rope tow one more year. Ed learned new skills such as operating a jack hammer and being a ski area manager. The area initially operated only on weekends, charging members $1.75 for adults, $1 for children and for non-members, $2.25 and $1.50."

=== The first sale of the area ===
The first 5 years showed slow but steady growth and there was an increasing need for more full-time management and some investment capital. "The corporation began considering selling the area to someone else to develop."

The San Luis Valley Historian records this history from Mr. Sharp: "About that time, we felt we were getting too big for volunteer management by a board of directors. With the growing number of skiers, we thought we needed to enlarge the area. We needed full-time management and a million dollars to develop it properly. We didn’t think we could raise that much money. We considered selling it. In the fall of 1960, after considering several offers to buy or take over the area, we entered into a deal with Mr. Joe Dyer of Dallas and a group headed by Clay Scott, a lawyer, to sell the assets of the corporation. They put Mr. Joe Brown in as resident manager and took over at the beginning of the 1960-61 ski season. They operated it for two years, however, the third year they didn’t even open the area! Brown had left the country, and no one looked after the area or was in charge."

"So, in February 1963, we started proceedings to repossess the area and operate it. Our legal claim was their failure to make payments for two years. We got possession in the late fall, just barely in time to check over the equipment and get it into working order."

Therefore, from 1963 to 1964 season until 1971, various other local individuals served as manager, ski school and ski patrol directors and coordinators, almost all without any pay! The area continued to grow for the next decade with the addition of two more Poma tows and increased runs with slope groomers.

=== The second sale of the area ===
Continuously struggling to remain financially solvent, there was continuing effort by the board to complete a sale. In 1971 the annual financial report indicated $48,000 of skier revenue, an additional $16,000 of snack bar, ski rental and other miscellaneous income. There were $19,000 in salaries plus a manager's commission of $3,149. There were $93,692 in total assets and a gross profit of $2.191. That year Sharp and most of the directors had been running the corporation and ski area for over ten years and the board determined once again that a sale was the best "end game". Glen Edmonds, then publisher of the Pagosa Springs Sun, was a stockholder and had become president when Sharp stepped into the treasurer's role. Ben Pinnell, a Dallas realtor, brought in Don Carter as a prime investor. Pinnell also interested three Dallas Cowboys as investors in promoting Wolf Creek: Charlie Waters, Dave Edwards, and Mike Ditka, who used to coach the Chicago Bears and the New Orleans Saints. The Dallas investor group purchased Wolf Creek in 1972 for a total of $275,000. They installed Wolf Creek's first chairlift in 1974. It was installed by Borvig, an east coast lift manufacturer. Sharp remained the treasurer for the new Dallas investors for a few years.

=== Sale of the ski area to Kingsbury Pitcher ===
The ski area was eventually sold by the Dallas Investment Co. to Kingsbury Pitcher in 1976, another pioneer of Colorado skiing lore. Pitcher is best known for becoming a major stockholder in and CEO of the Wolf Creek Ski Development Company in 1976, and then later taking full ownership and control of the company in 1978. "Pitch," as he was affectionately known, was an inductee into the Colorado Ski Hall of Fame on October 17, 2014.

=== The Wolf Creek Ski Hall of Famers ===
Charles Elliott, another of the other pioneers at Wolf Creek Ski area was officially inducted into the Colorado Ski Hall of Fame in 2011. Both Charles and Pitch were preceded into the Hall of Fame since, on October 18, 1996, Ed Sharp was posthumously inducted into the Colorado Ski Hall of Fame (now known as the Colorado Snowsports Hall of Fame) in the Sport Builder category, for his long involvement in the development and growth of the Wolf Creek Ski Area and his role as president of the corporation for 12 years. He died in September 1996 at age 85, 33 days before his induction ceremony.

== Future ==
WCSA's future as a local's resort is less certain, in light of Texas-billionaire Red McCombs' proposed development of the "Village at Wolf Creek," a year-round resort of 8,000 people adjacent to the ski area. For decades McCombs has pursued his vision for the development and has been working with the Forest Service to acquire highway access to the property, which is an inholding.

Over several decades the Forest Service has been the target of multiple lawsuits from community groups for incompletely assessing the environmental impact of approving a highway access point to the property and withholding information requested through the Freedom of Information Act. Following the most recent lawsuit, the developers reached agreement not to break ground at the site until the case is resolved in court.

Opponents of the Village state that the development would likely harm a vital wildlife corridor between the Weminuche and South San Juan Wilderness areas, alter backcountry experiences on Wolf Creek Pass, compete with local businesses in nearby Pagosa Springs and South Fork, adversely affect rare fen wetlands, and stress water supplies in the Rio Grande watershed. Proponents claim the "Village" would improve the economics of the region.

== Statistics ==
=== Elevation ===
- Base: 10,300 ft (3,100 m)
- Summit: 11,904 ft (3,628 m)
- Vertical Rise: 1,604 ft (489 m)

=== Trails ===
- Skiable Area: 1,600 acres (6.5 km^{2})
- Trails: 77 total (20% beginner, 35% intermediate, 45% advanced/expert)
- Longest Run: Navajo Trail - 2 miles (3.2 km)
- Average Annual Snowfall: 430 in (11 m)

=== Lifts ===
Wolf Creek has nine lifts.

== Snowfall Records ==
Wolf Creek Ski Area is known for getting copious amounts of snow in the winter time. While on average the area receives around 430 inches of snow during a given season, Wolf Creek Ski Area's history includes several outlier snow years. For example, during the 1978-1979 snow year, Wolf Creek Ski Area was given a plentiful 807 inches of snow, which happens to be the record for the most snowfall ever fallen in one season in Colorado. The following year of 1979-1980 Wolf Creek received 730.5 inches of snow. And there are rumors Wolf Creek had another monster snow year in the early 1940s as well.
