= Silverton Mountain =

Ski area in Colorado, United States

Silverton

- Location in Colorado Silverton (the United States)
- Location: Storm Peak; Silverton, Colorado, US
- Nearest city: Silverton, Colorado
- Coordinates: 37.88470°N 107.66529°W
- Top elevation: 13,487 feet (4,111 m)
- Base elevation: 10,400 feet (3,200 m)
- Skiable area: 1,819 acres (736 ha)
- Lift system: 1 total
- Terrain parks: 0
- Snowfall: 450-500 in
- Website: silvertonmountain.com

Silverton Mountain is a ski area near Silverton, Colorado, United States that opened on January 19, 2002. Popular with skiers and snowboarders, Silverton Mountain has one chairlift that carries visitors into its terrain, which is for advanced and expert skiers or riders. Avalanche gear is required to ride the lift at all times due to the unpatrolled and ungroomed nature of Silverton. In addition to Silverton Mountain's 1,819 acres of lift accessed skiing, Silverton also serves as a base area for over 22,000 acres of helicopter accessed skiing. Uniquely, Silverton is only open Thursday through Sunday from December through April.

== Description ==
Silverton Mountain is located in San Juan County, just six miles from the historic mining town of Silverton, Colorado. The ski area is known for adventure, powder and steep terrain. At 13,487 feet, it is North America's highest and lays claim to being the most expert ski area.

The mountain has 1,819 acres of lift accessed terrain and over 22,000 acres of hike to and helicopter accessed terrain. There are no groomed runs and no cut trails. Skiers and snowboarders can access some of the best powder skiing in the world. Due to the high elevation of the San Juan Mountains and limited number of daily skiers the snow quality is typically very good.

During certain times of year the ski area only allows guided skiing. Guides are provided by Silverton Mountain. Each guided group of eight skiers or less can expect to typically hike between 5 and 45 minutes to access runs. Some runs drop straight from the chair lift. Hiking 15 minutes to an hour allows access to large open bowls and steep, tight chutes.

Avalanche safety equipment is required to be worn by every skier and rider. Required equipment includes an avalanche beacon, a shovel, and a probe. These items are available for rent from Silverton Mountain. Reservations are highly recommended for guided skiing as the mountain does book up. Guides are also available during the unguided season.

On January 14, 2012, 25-year-old Sydney Elizabeth Owens was skiing the "Riff" run with a guide when she fell and slid 1,500 feet down the mountain. Ski patrol attempted to revive her but she was pronounced dead when the ambulance arrived. This was her first run of the day and the fall was blamed on a binding failure.

== Heli Skiing ==
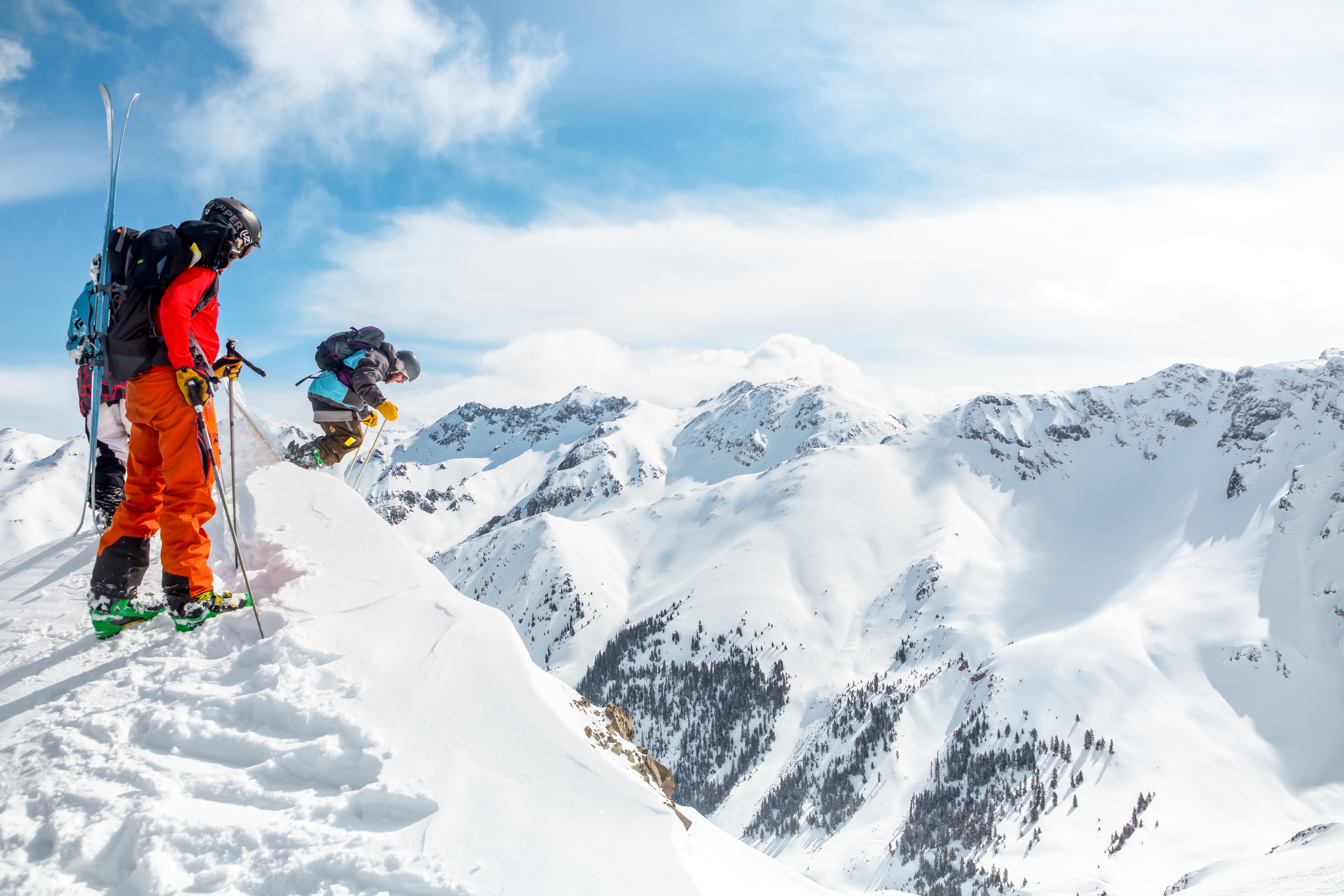
Dropping a little cornice on the way up to Silverton's iconic Billboard.

Silverton Mountain is the only operation in the contiguous United States to offer heli skiing by the drop. Silverton Mountain heli accessed terrain is designated for advanced and expert skiers and snowboarders only.

== History ==
Silverton Mountain was founded by Aaron and Jen Brill and opened for business on January 19, 2002, with one double chair that had been purchased from Mammoth Mountain Ski Area. Known for lift accessed backcountry skiing, Silverton Mountain also maintains educational programs such as Avalanche Level I, Avalanche Level II, and Backcountry 101. The ski area is designed to have minimal impact on the environment. Based purely on skiing and not on development Silverton Mountain has no plans of building condos or high-speed chairlifts. In 2006 it was voted "Best of the West: Skiing in Colorado, Utah, California and Nevada for Extreme Terrain" by USA Today.

== Television and movies ==
Bloomberg TV "Skiers Tempt Fate on Exclusive Expert-Only Mountain"

Warren Miller "Children of Winter"

Matchstick Productions "Attack of La Nina"

Teton Gravity Research "The Dream Factory"

== Maps ==
- Trail Map
