= Index of Montana-related articles =

The location of the state of Montana in the United States of America

The following is an alphabetical list of articles related to the U.S. state of Montana.

== 0–9 ==
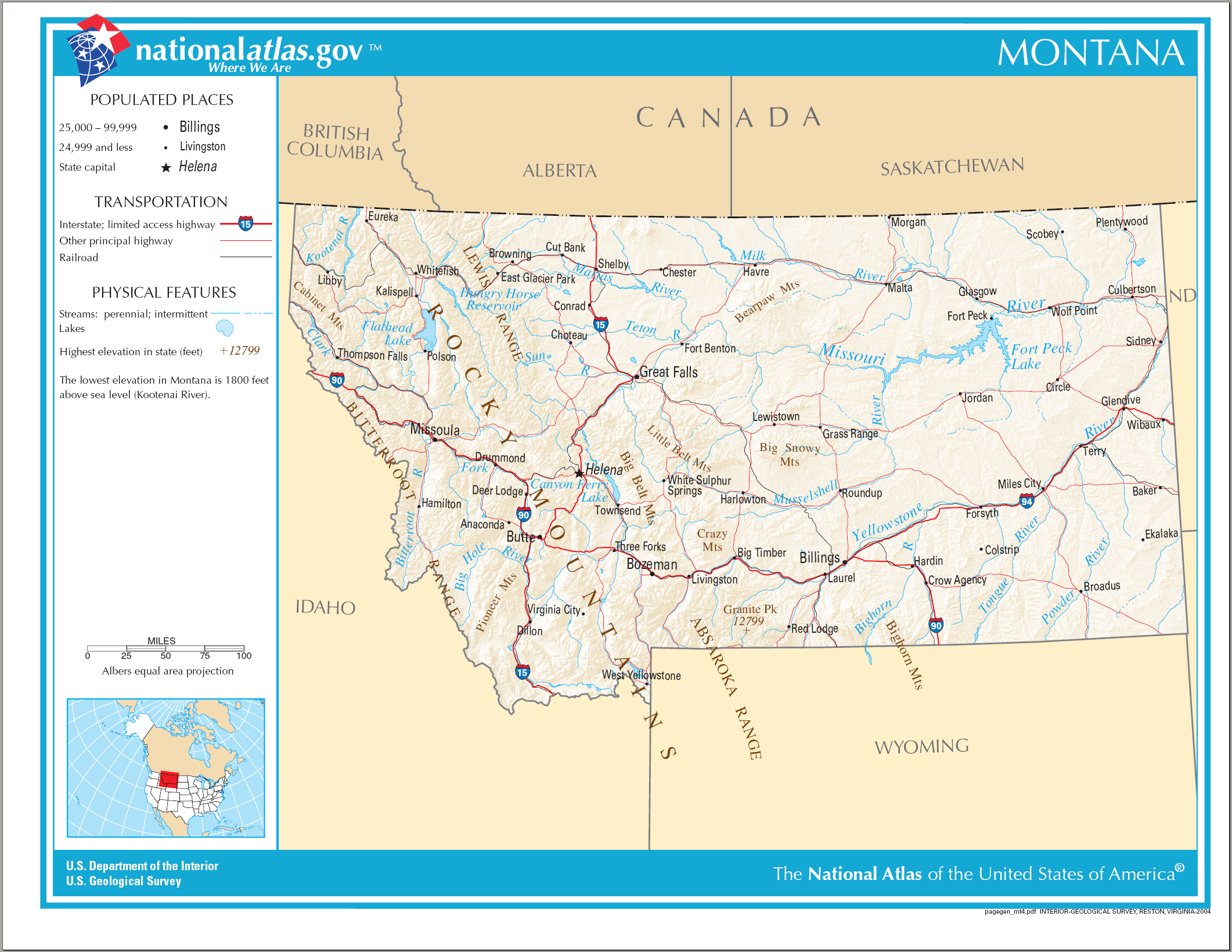
An enlargeable map of the state of Montana

- .mt.us – Internet second-level domain for the state of Montana
- 3-7-77
- 7th Cavalry Regiment
- 27th meridian west from Washington
- 34th meridian west from Washington
- 39th meridian west from Washington
- 45th parallel north
- 46th parallel north
- 47th parallel north
- 48th parallel north
- 49th parallel north
- 105th meridian west
- 106th meridian west
- 107th meridian west
- 108th meridian west
- 109th meridian west
- 110th meridian west
- 111th meridian west
- 112th meridian west
- 113th meridian west
- 114th meridian west
- 115th meridian west
- 116th meridian west

== A ==
- Abortion in Montana
- Absaroka-Beartooth Wilderness
- Adjacent states and provinces:
  - Province of Alberta
  - Province of British Columbia
  - Province of Saskatchewan
  - State of Idaho
  - State of North Dakota
  - State of South Dakota
  - State of Wyoming
- Agriculture in Montana
- Agropyron spicatum
- Airports in Montana
- Amphibians and reptiles of Montana
- Anaconda-Pintler Wilderness
- Arboreta in Montana
  - commons:Category:Arboreta in Montana
- Archaeology of Montana
  - Category:Archaeological sites in Montana
    - commons:Category:Archaeological sites in Montana
- Architecture of Montana
- Area codes in Montana
- Art museums and galleries in Montana
  - commons:Category:Art museums and galleries in Montana
- Artists of Montana

== B ==
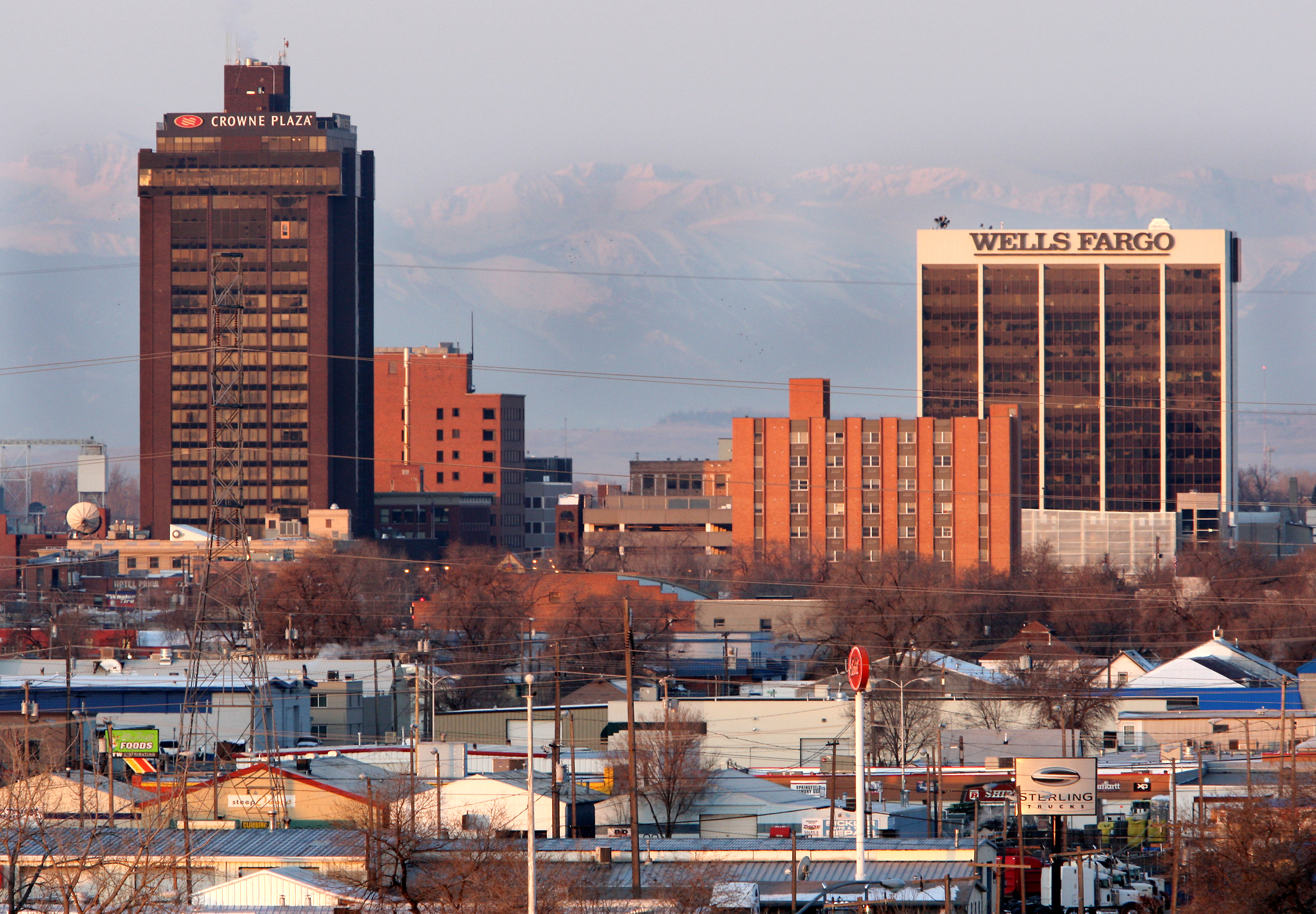
Billings, Montana

- Baldwin v. Fish and Game Commission of Montana
- Bannack, Montana Territory, first territorial capital 1864-1865
- Battle of Bear Paw
- Battle of Canyon Creek
- Battle of Cedar Creek
- Battle of Powder River
- Battle of the Big Hole
- Battle of the Little Bighorn
- Battle of the Rosebud
- Battle of Wolf Mountain
- Beaverhead-Deerlodge National Forest
- Beaverhead Rock
- Benton Lake National Wildlife Refuge
- Benton Lake Wetland Management District
- Big Hole National Battlefield
- Big Sky Country
- Bike paths in Montana
- Billings, Montana
- Billings Symphony Orchestra
- Bison Range
- Bitterroot
- Bitterroot Mountains
- Bitterroot National Forest
- Bitterroot Valley
- Black Coulee National Wildlife Refuge
- Black Hills War
- Blackfeet Indian Reservation
- Blackspotted Cutthroat Trout
- Bluebunch Wheatgrass
- Bob Marshall Wilderness Complex
- Bob Marshall Wilderness
- Botanical gardens in Montana
  - commons:Category:Botanical gardens in Montana
- Bowdoin National Wildlife Refuge
- Bozeman Trail
- Bridges on the National Register of Historic Places in Montana
- Buildings and structures in Montana
  - commons:Category:Buildings and structures in Montana

== C ==
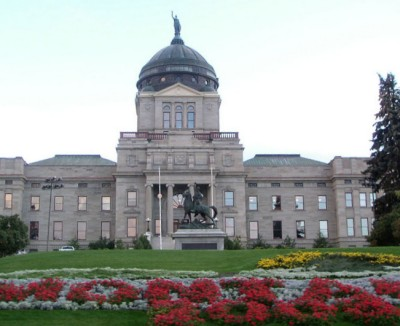
Montana State Capitol in Helena

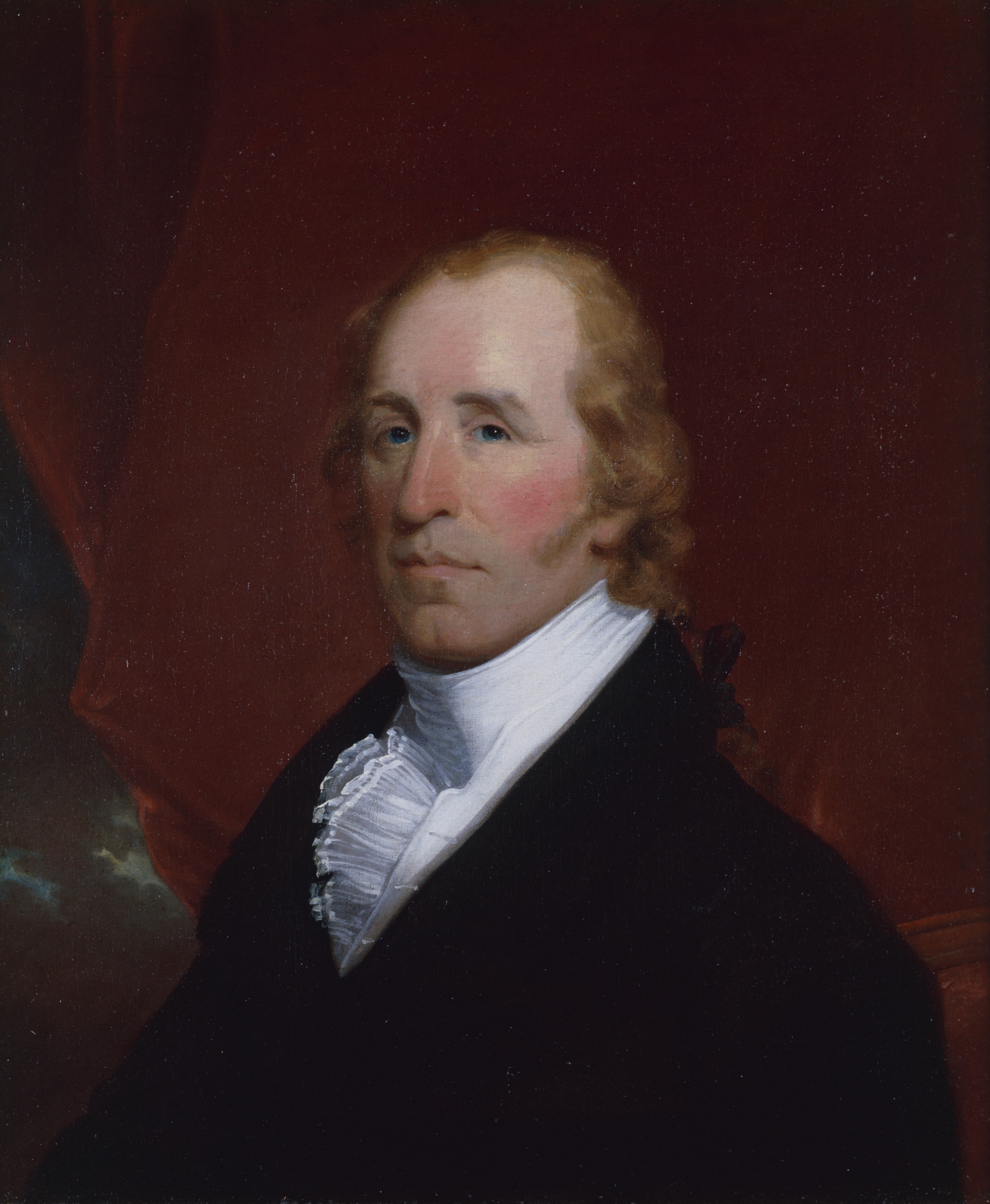
William Clark

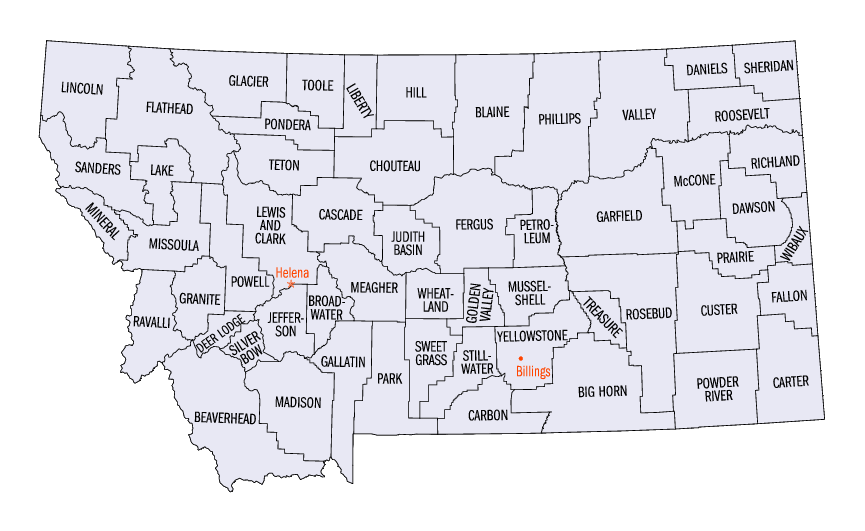
An enlargeable map of the 56 counties of the state of Montana

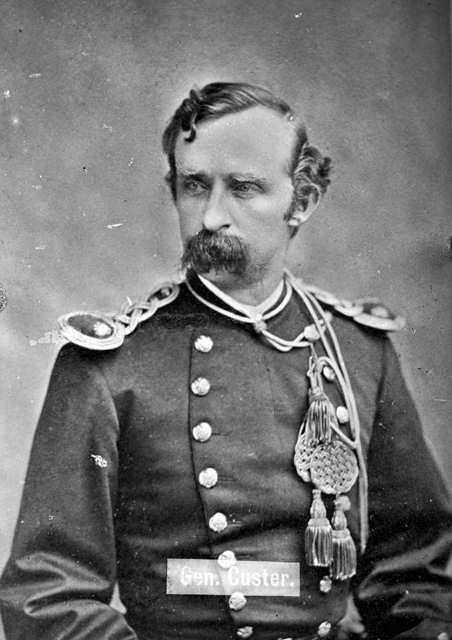
George Armstrong Custer

- Cabinet Mountains Wilderness
- Capital of the state of Montana
- Capitol of the State of Montana
- Caves of Montana
  - commons:Category:Caves of Montana
- Census Designated Places in Montana
- Census statistical areas in Montana
- Charles M. Russell National Wildlife Refuge
- Charles M. Russell National Wildlife Refuge Complex
- Chief Joseph
- Chief Plenty Coups (Alek-Chea-Ahoosh) State Park and Home
- Cities and towns in Montana
  - Cities in Montana
  - Towns in Montana
- Clams and Mussels of Montana
- Clark, William
- Climate of Montana
- Climate change in Montana
- Club-mosses and Mosses of Montana
- Colleges and universities in Montana
- Columbia Basin
- Communications in Montana
  - commons:Category:Communications in Montana
- Companies based in Montana
- Confederate Gulch and Diamond City
- Constitution of the State of Montana
- Counties of the state of Montana
  - commons:Category:Counties in Montana
  - Counties of Montana ranked by per capita income
- Crazy Horse
- Crazy Mountains
- Crazy Peak
- Creedman Coulee National Wildlife Refuge
- Crow Nation
- Crustaceans of Montana
- CSKT Bison Range
- Culture of Montana
  - commons:Category:Montana culture
- Custer, George Armstrong
- Custer National Forest

== D ==
- Dams in Montana
- Demographics of Montana
- Diamond City
- Dicotyledons of Montana
- District of Louisiana
- Duck-billed Dinosaur
- Dull Knife Fight

== E ==
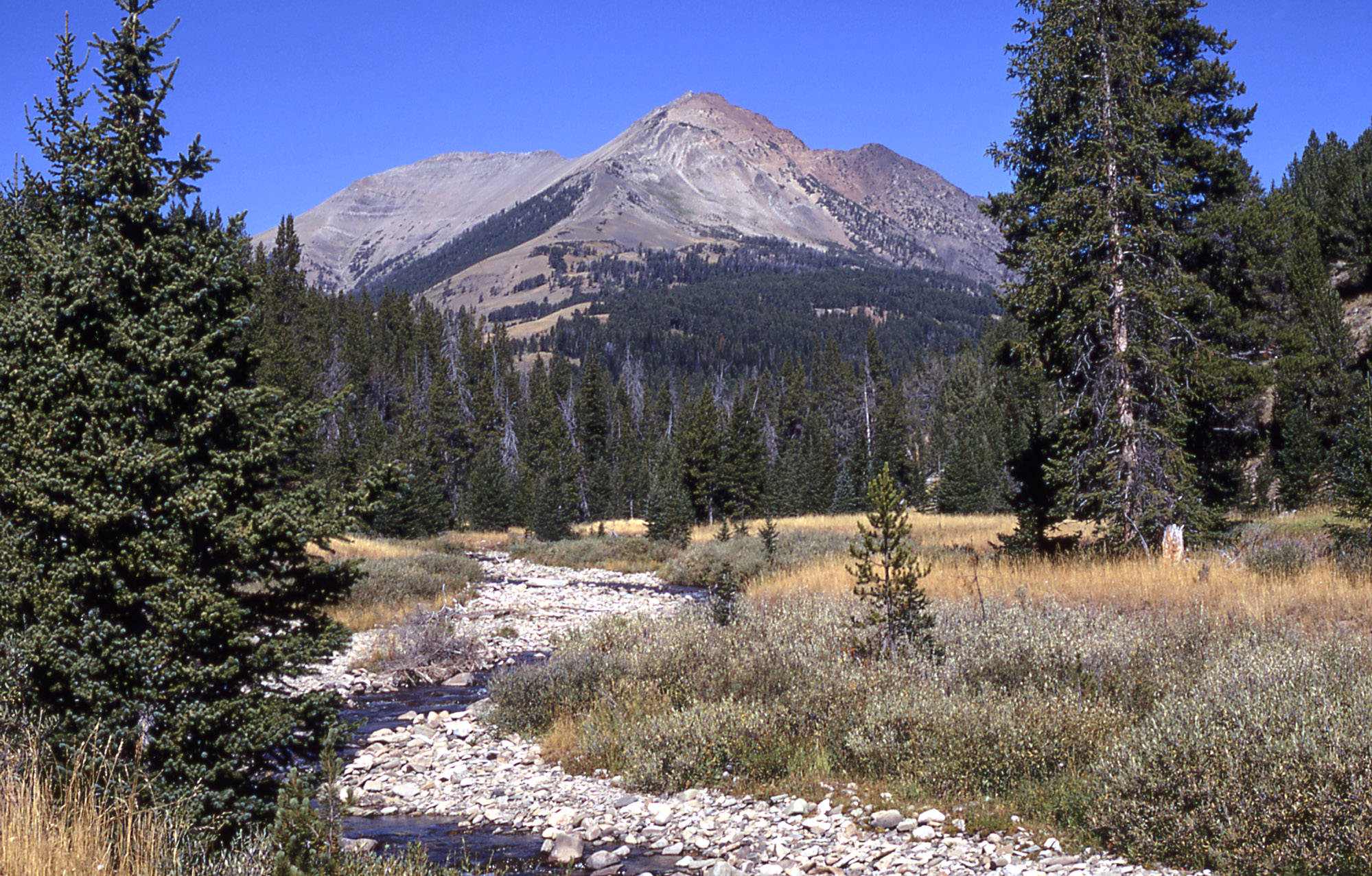
Electric Peak

- Economy of Montana
  - Category:Economy of Montana
    - commons:Category:Economy of Montana
- Education in Montana
  - Category:Education in Montana
    - commons:Category:Education in Montana
- Category:Elections in Montana
  - commons:Category:Elections in Montana
- Electric Peak
- Category:Environment of Montana
  - commons:Category:Environment of Montana

== F ==
The flag of the State of Montana

- Fauna of Montana
- Federal highways in Montana
- Fictional characters from Montana
- Films set in Montana
- Films shot in Montana
- Fish of Montana
- Flag of the State of Montana
- Flathead Indian Reservation
- Flathead Lake
- Flathead National Forest
- Flora of Montana
- Forests in Montana
- Fort Belknap Indian Reservation
- Fort Peck Indian Reservation
- Forts in Montana
  - Category:Forts in Montana
    - commons:Category:Forts in Montana

== G ==
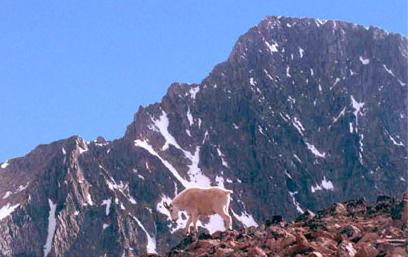
A mountain goat below Granite Peak

The Great Seal of the State of Montana

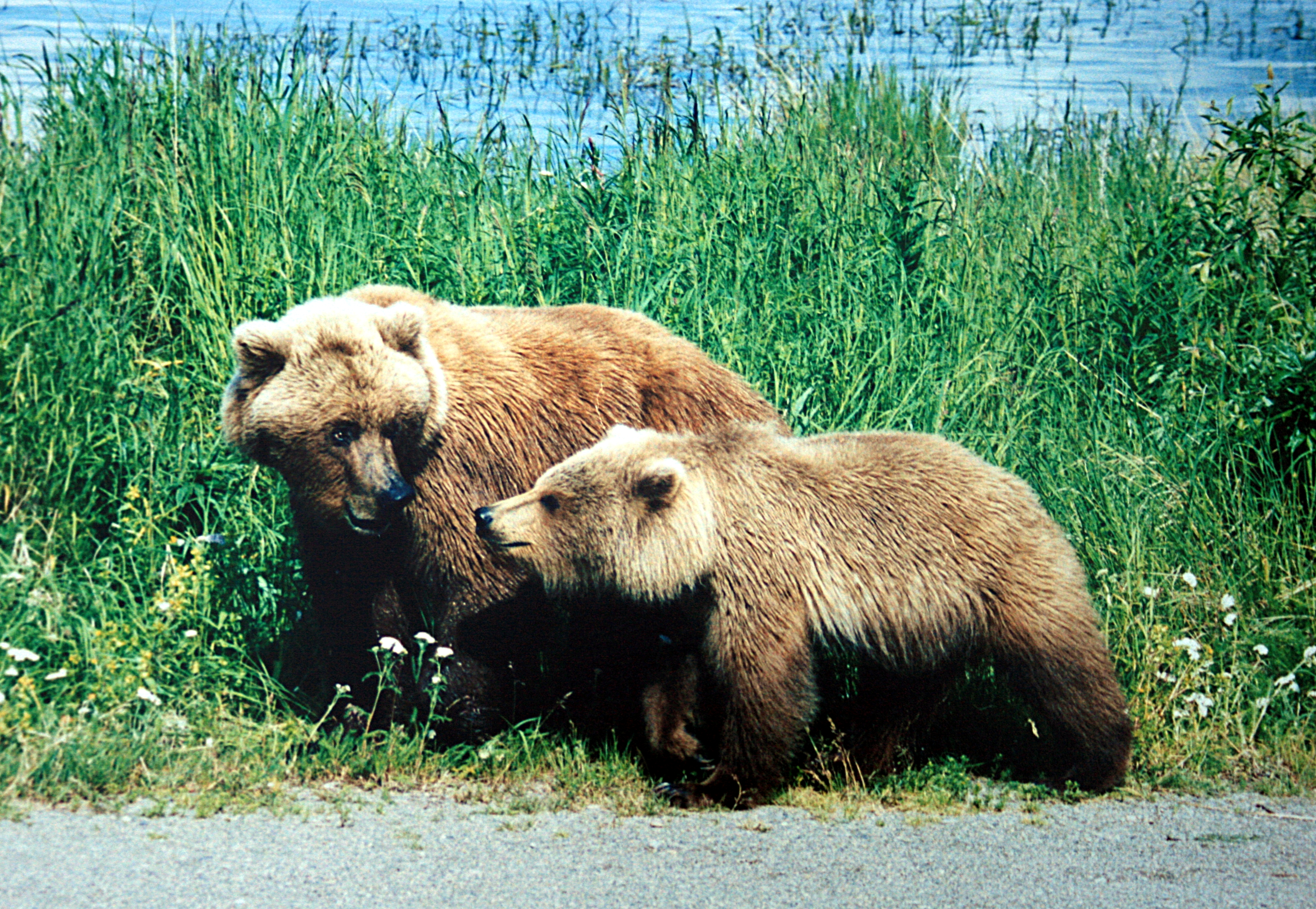
Grizzly bear with cub

- Gallatin National Forest
- Gates of the Mountains Wilderness
- Geography of Montana
  - Category:Geography of Montana
    - commons:Category:Geography of Montana
- Geology of Montana
- Geology of the Rocky Mountains
  - commons:Category:Geology of Montana
- Ghost towns in Montana
  - Category:Ghost towns in Montana
    - commons:Category:Ghost towns in Montana
- Giant Springs
- Glaciers of Montana
  - commons:Category:Glaciers of Montana
- Government of the state of Montana website
  - Constitution of the State of Montana
  - Category:Government of Montana
    - commons:Category:Government of Montana
- Governor of the State of Montana
  - Governor's Residence of Montana
  - List of governors of Montana
- Glacial Lake Missoula
- Glacier National Park
- Glaciers in Montana
- Granite Peak
- Grant-Kohrs Ranch National Historic Site
- Grass Lake National Wildlife Refuge
- Great Bear Wilderness
- Great Falls, Montana
- Great Falls of the Missouri River
- Great Seal of the State of Montana
- Grizzly bear

== H ==
- Hailstone National Wildlife Refuge
- Helena, Montana, territorial and state capital since 1875
- Helena National Forest
- Hewitt Lake National Wildlife Refuge
- High schools in Montana
- Highway Patrol of Montana
- Highways in Montana
- Hiking trails in Montana
  - commons:Category:Hiking trails in Montana
- History of Montana
  - Historical outline of Montana
- Hot springs of Montana
  - commons:Category:Hot springs of Montana
- House of Representatives of the State of Montana
  - Montana State Representatives

== I ==
- Idaho Panhandle National Forest
- Images of Montana
  - commons:Category:Montana
- Individuals executed in Montana
- Insignia of the State of Montana
- Interstate Highways in Montana
- Islands in Montana

== J ==
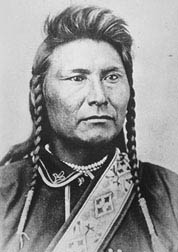
Chief Joseph

- Chief Joseph

== K ==
- Kootenai National Forest

== L ==
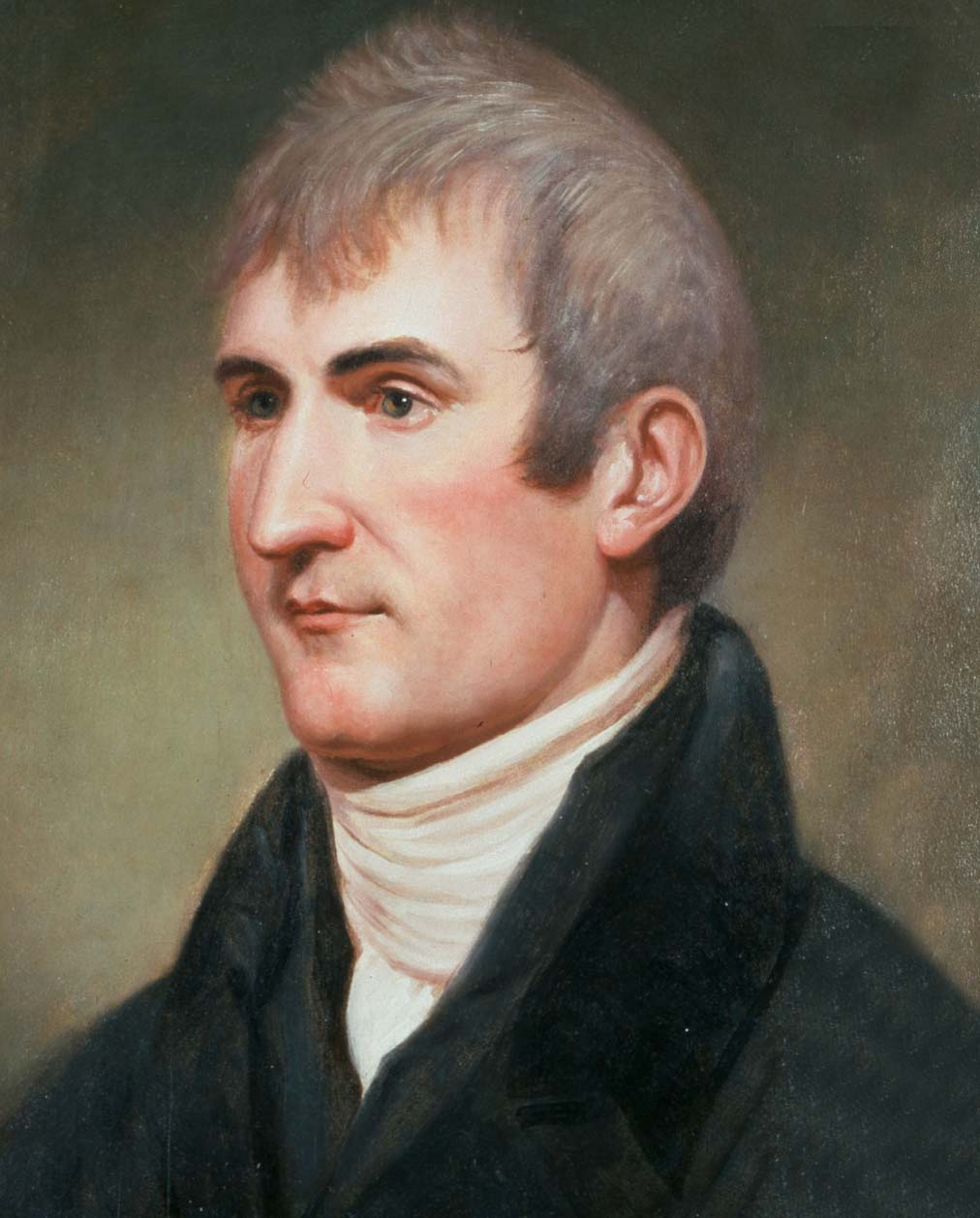
Meriwether Lewis

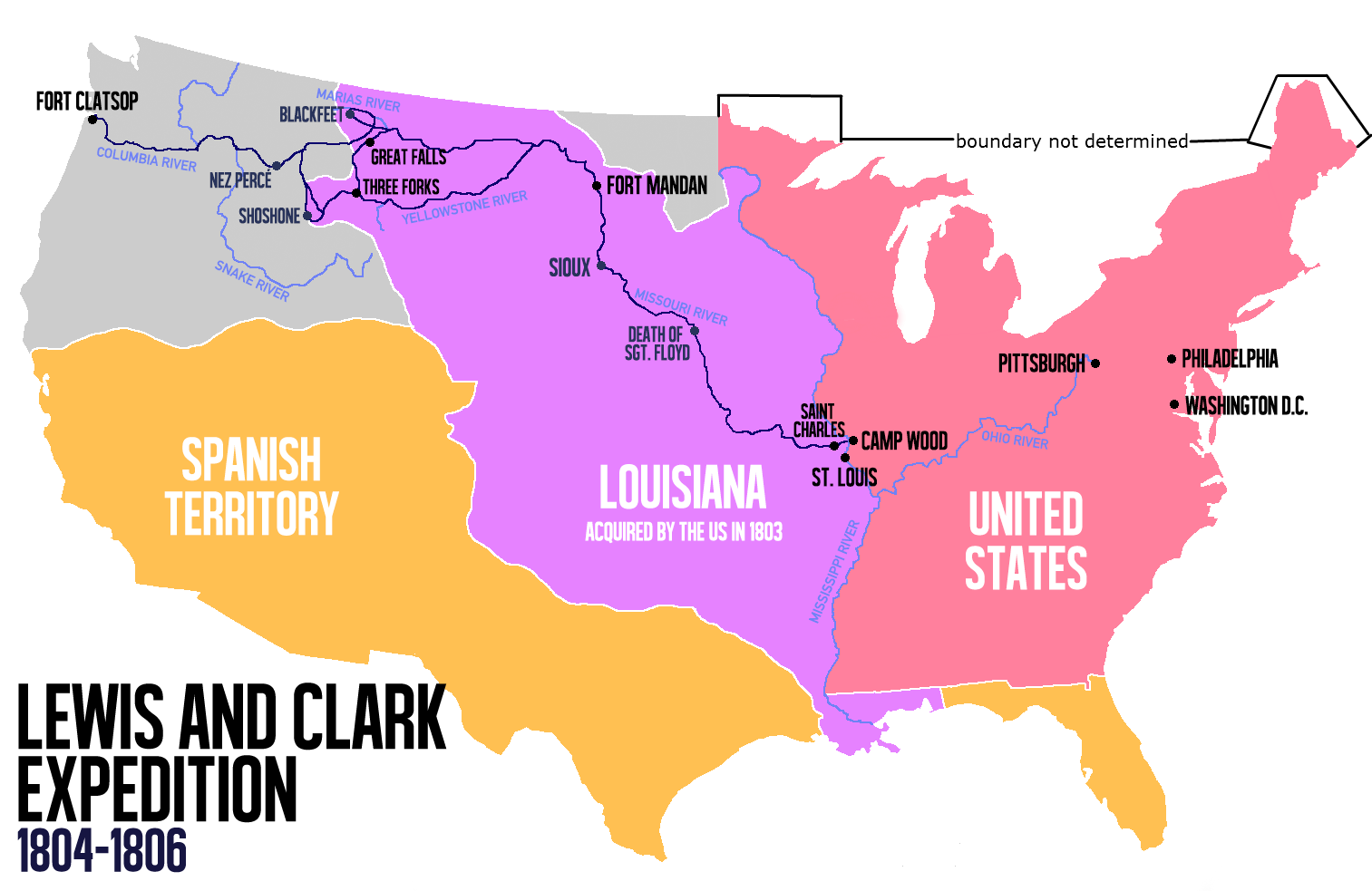
The route of the Lewis and Clark Expedition

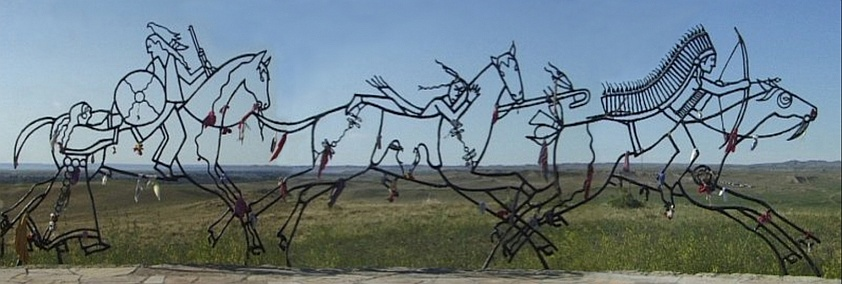
Native American Memorial at Little Bighorn Battlefield National Monument

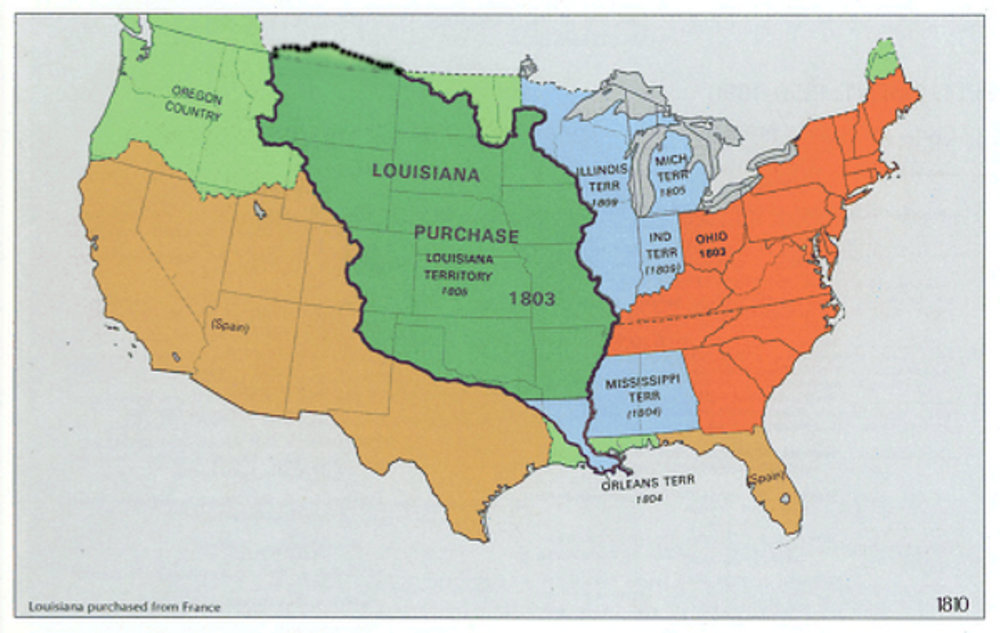
Map of the Louisiana Purchase

- Lake Mason National Wildlife Refuge
- Lake Thibadeau National Wildlife Refuge
- Lakes of Montana
  - commons:Category:Lakes of Montana
- Lamesteer National Wildlife Refuge
- Landforms of Montana
- Landmarks in Montana
  - commons:Category:Landmarks in Montana
- Lee Metcalf National Wildlife Refuge
- Lee Metcalf Wilderness
- Legislature of the State of Montana
  - Montana Senate
  - Montana House of Representatives
- Lewis, Meriwether
- Lewis and Clark Caverns
- Lewis and Clark Expedition
- Lewis and Clark National Forest
- Lewis Overthrust
- Lewisia rediviva
- Lists related to the State of Montana:
  - List of amphibians and reptiles of Montana
  - List of airports in Montana
  - List of bridges on the National Register of Historic Places in Montana
  - List of census statistical areas in Montana
  - List of cities and towns in Montana
    - List of cities and towns along the Missouri River
  - List of colleges and universities in Montana
  - List of counties in Montana
    - List of Montana county seats
    - List of dicotyledons of Montana
    - List of Montana county name etymologies
  - List of dams and reservoirs in Montana
  - List of fish of Montana
  - List of flora and fauna of Montana
  - List of forests in Montana
  - List of forts in Montana
  - List of ghost towns in Montana
  - List of governors of Montana
  - List of high schools in Montana
  - List of hospitals in Montana
  - List of individuals executed in Montana
  - List of islands of Montana
  - List of lakes in Montana
  - List of Lichens of Montana
  - List of mammals of Montana
  - List of museums in Montana
  - List of mountains in Montana
  - List of National Historic Landmarks in Montana
  - List of newspapers in Montana
  - List of non-marine molluscs of Montana
  - List of oil fields of Montana
  - List of people from Montana
  - List of places in Montana
  - List of power stations in Montana
  - List of radio stations in Montana
  - List of railroads in Montana
  - List of rapids in Montana
  - List of Registered Historic Places in Montana
  - List of rivers of Montana
  - List of state forests in Montana
  - List of state highways in Montana
    - List of secondary highways in Montana
  - List of state parks in Montana
  - List of state prisons in Montana
  - List of telephone area codes in Montana
  - List of television stations in Montana
  - List of tunnels in Montana
  - List of waterfalls in Montana
  - List of Montana's congressional delegations
  - List of United States congressional districts in Montana
  - List of United States representatives from Montana
  - List of United States senators from Montana
  - Mountain passes in Montana (A-L)
  - Mountain passes in Montana (M-Z)
- Little Bighorn Battlefield National Monument
- Lolo National Forest
- Lost Trail National Wildlife Refuge
  - Louisiana Purchase of 1803

== M ==
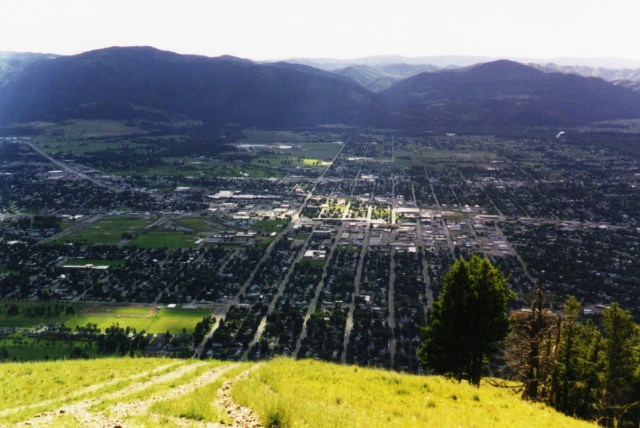
Missoula, Montana

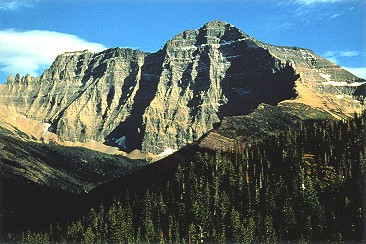
Mount Cleveland in Glacier National Park

- Maiasaura peeblesorum
- Makoshika State Park
- Malmstrom Air Force Base
- Mammals of Montana
- Maps of Montana
  - commons:Category:Maps of Montana
- Medicine Lake National Wildlife Refuge
- Medicine Lake Wilderness
- Meriwether Lewis
- Metropolitan areas in Montana
- Micropolitan statistical areas in Montana
- Military in Montana
- Mission Mountains Wilderness
- Missoula, Montana
- Missouri Headwaters State Park
- Missouri River
- Monocotyledons of Montana

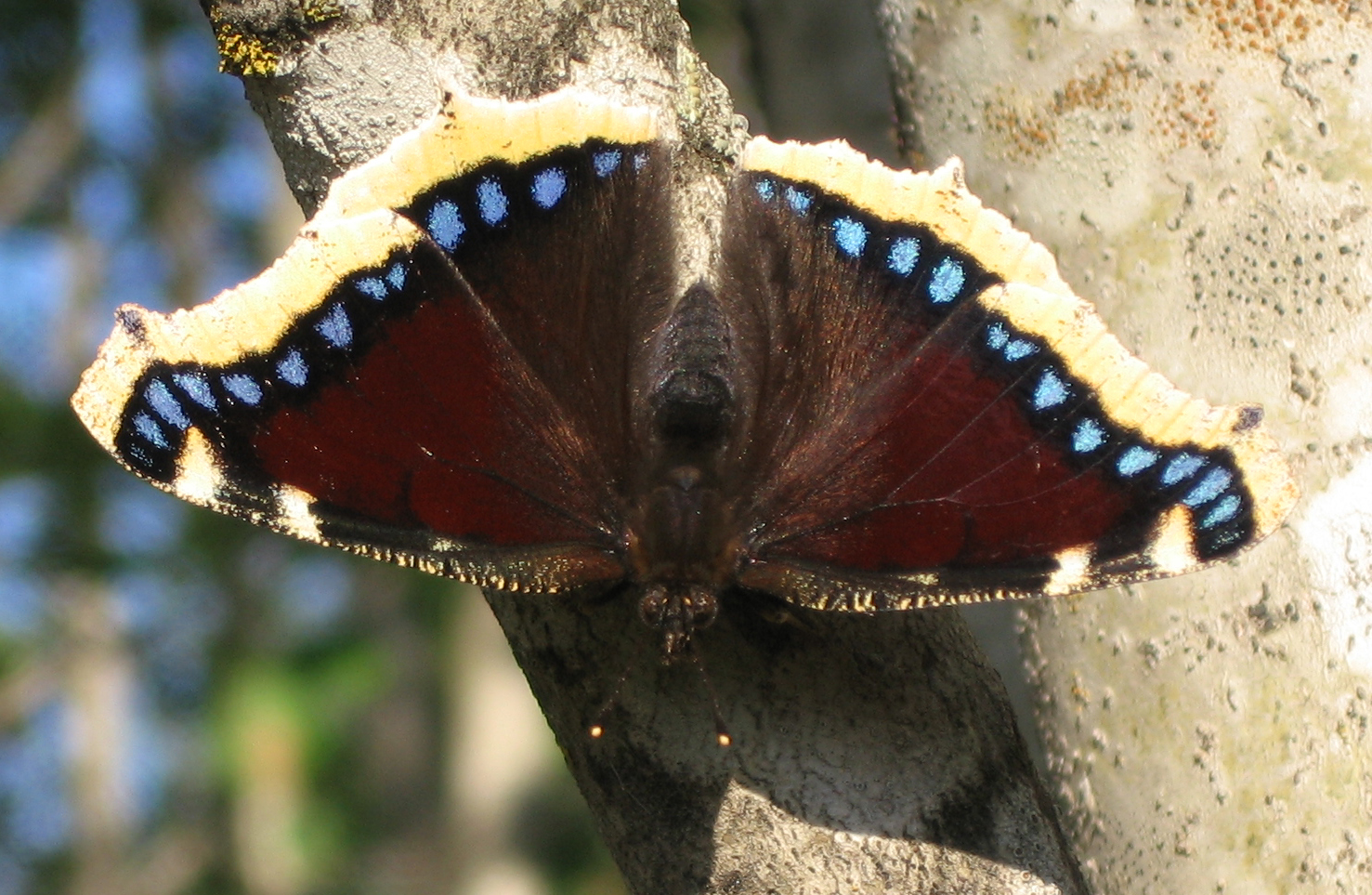
Mourning cloak butterfly

- Montana website
  - Category:Montana
    - commons:Category:Montana
- Montana (song)
- Montana 500
- Montana Air National Guard
- Montana Army National Guard
- Montana Cost of Public Education
- Montana Democratic Party
- Montana Department of Transportation
- Montana Dinosaur Trail
- Montana Highway Patrol
- Montana Legislative Referendum 121
- Montana Melody
- Montana Pride
- Montana Republican Party
- Montana State Capitol
- Montana State University System
- Montana Stream Access Law
- Montana Television Network
- Monuments and memorials in Montana
  - commons:Category:Monuments and memorials in Montana
- Mountain passes in Montana
- Mountain ranges in Montana
- Mountain States
- Mountains of Montana
  - Mount Cleveland
  - Mount Stimson
  - Mountain peaks of the Rocky Mountains
  - commons:Category:Mountains of Montana
- Mount Ellis Academy, Bozeman, Montana
- Mourning cloak
- MT – United States Postal Service postal code for the State of Montana
- Mullan Road
- Museums in Montana
  - Category:Museums in Montana
    - commons:Category:Museums in Montana
- Music of Montana
  - commons:Category:Music of Montana
  - Category:Musical groups from Montana
  - Category:Montana musicians

== N ==
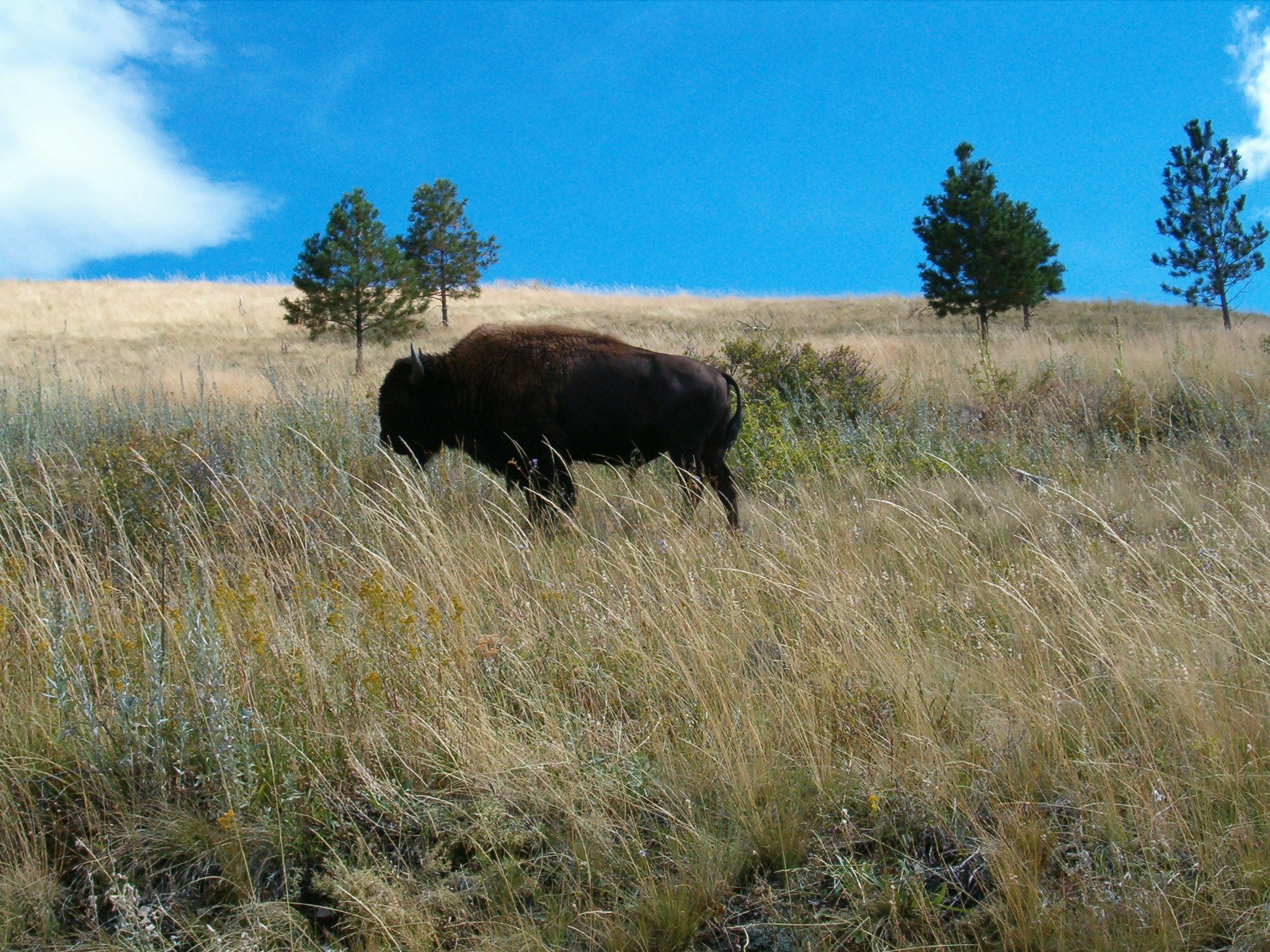
Bison Range

- National Bison Range
- National forests of Montana
  - commons:Category:National Forests of Montana
- National Historic Landmarks in Montana
- National Historic Sites in Montana
- National Natural Landmarks in Montana
- National Wilderness Areas in Montana
- National Wildlife Refuges in Montana
- Native Nations in Montana
- Natural disasters in Montana
- Natural gas pipelines in Montana
- Natural history of Montana
  - commons:Category:Natural history of Montana
- Newspapers in Montana
- Nez Perce National Historic Trail
- Ninepipe National Wildlife Refuge
- Northwest Montana Wetland Management District
- Northwestern United States
- Nymphalis antiopa

== O ==
- Oncorhynchus clarki lewisi
- Oregon Country
- Oregon Treaty of 1846
- Organizations based in Montana
- Oro y Plata

== P ==
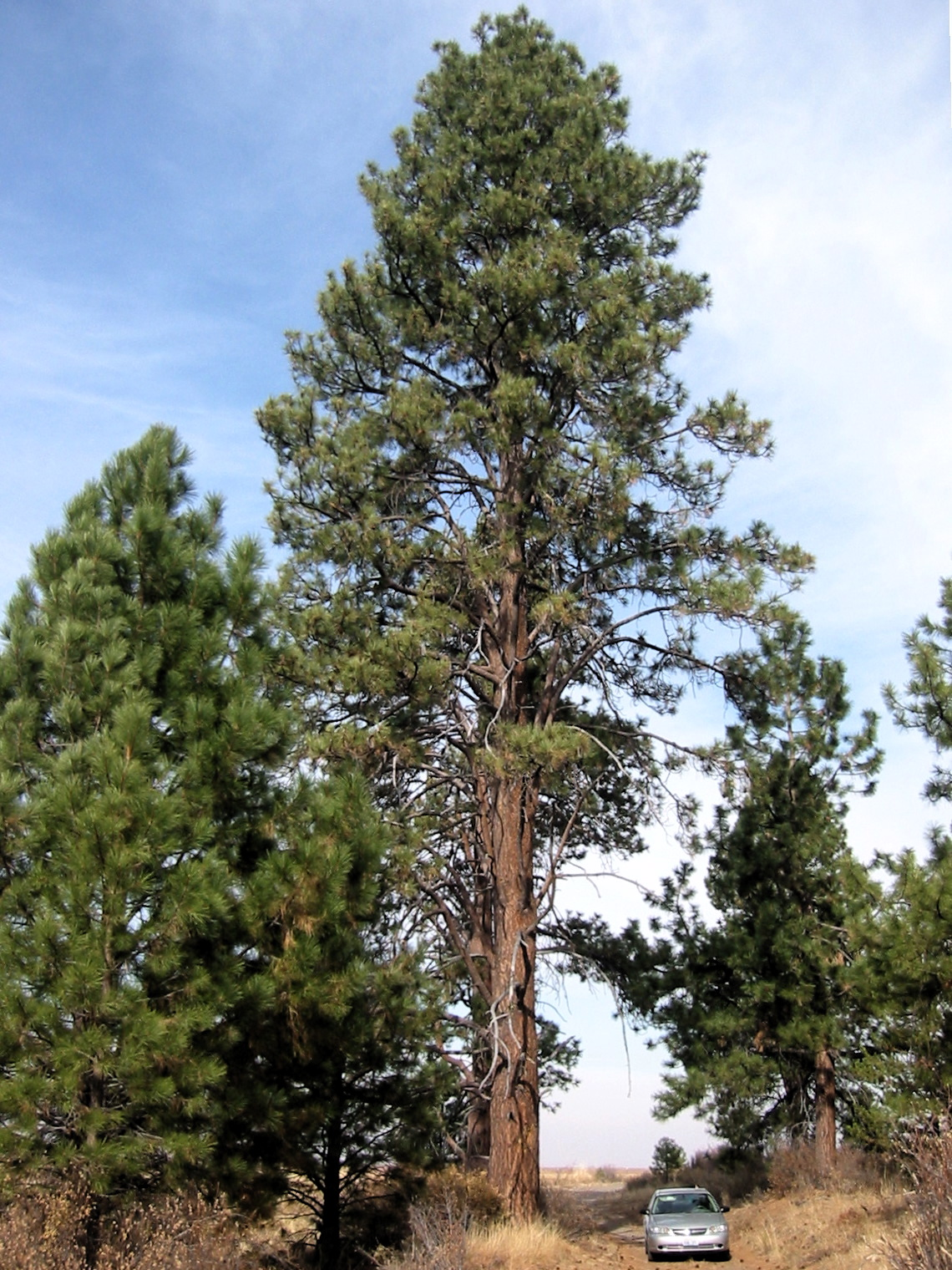
- Ponderosa pine
- Pablo National Wildlife Refuge
- Pacific Northwest Economic Region
- Parker Homestead State Park
- People from Montana
  - Category:People from Montana
    - commons:Category:People from Montana
    - Category:People from Montana by populated place
    - Category:People from Montana by county
    - Category:People from Montana by occupation
- Pinus ponderosa
- Places in Montana ranked by per capita income
- Politics of Montana
  - commons:Category:Politics of Montana
- Pompeys Pillar National Monument
- Ponderosa pine
- Powder River Basin
- Protected areas of Montana
  - commons:Category:Protected areas of Montana

== R ==
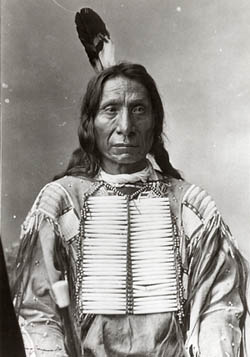
Red Cloud

- Radio stations in Montana
- Rail transport in Montana
  - Railroads in Montana
- Rapids in Montana
- Rattlesnake National Recreation Area
- Rattlesnake Wilderness
- Red Cloud
- Red Cloud's War
- Red Rock Lakes National Wildlife Refuge
- Red Rock Lakes Wilderness
- Regions of Montana
- Regional designations of Montana
- Registered Historic Places in Montana
- Religion in Montana
  - Category:Religion in Montana
    - commons:Category:Religion in Montana
- Reptiles of Montana
- Rivers in Montana
- Rocky Boy Indian Reservation
- Rocky Mountain Front
- Rocky Mountains

== S ==
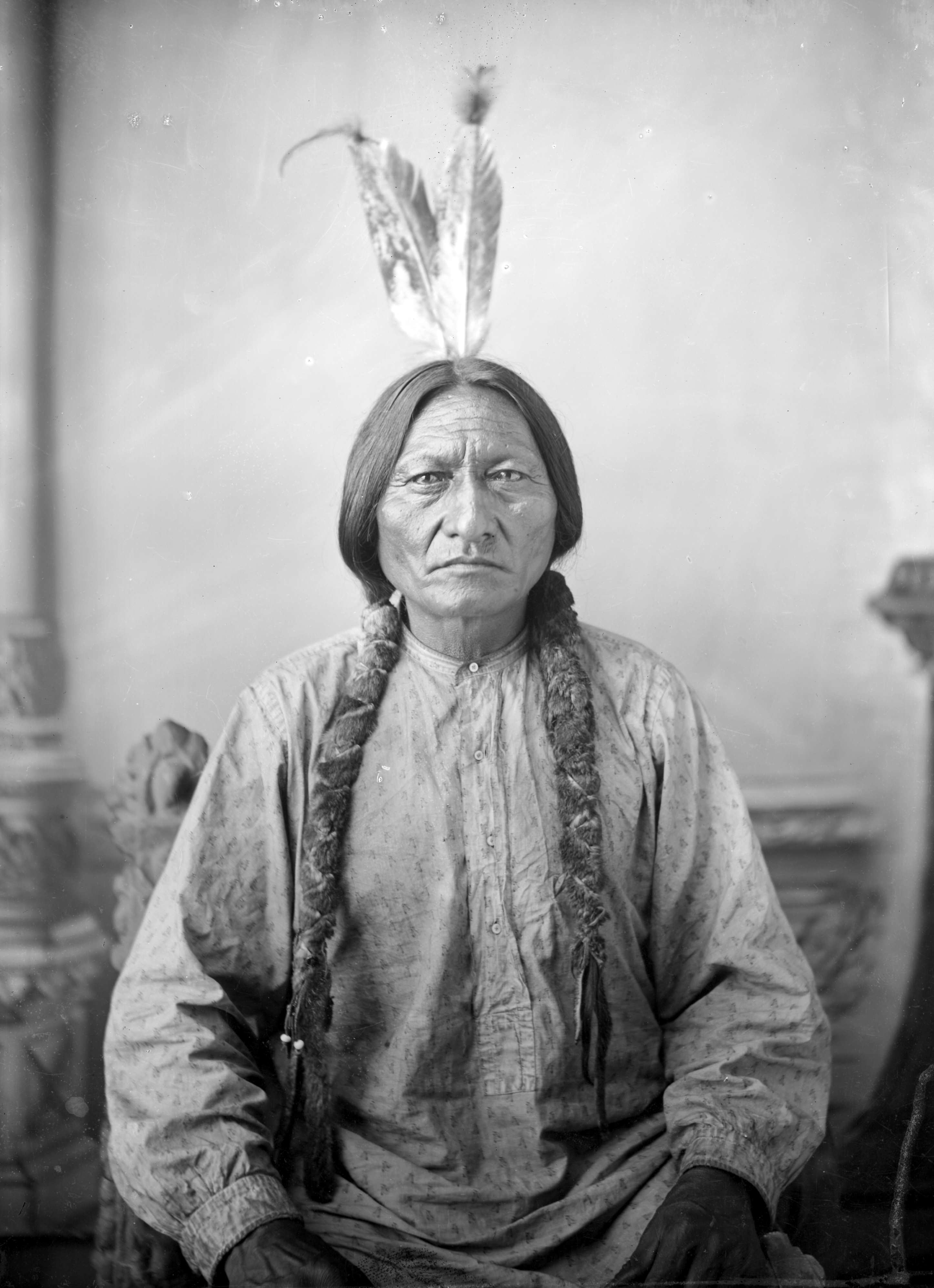
Sitting Bull

- Sacagawea
- Scapegoat Wilderness
- Selway-Bitterroot Wilderness
- Senate of the State of Montana
  - Montana State Senators
- Settlements in Montana
  - Cities in Montana
  - Towns in Montana
  - Census Designated Places in Montana
  - Other unincorporated communities in Montana
  - List of ghost towns in Montana
  - List of places in Montana
- Seventh Cavalry Regiment
- Simms Fishing Products
- Sitting Bull
- Ski areas and resorts in Montana
  - commons:Category:Ski areas and resorts in Montana
- Solar power in Montana
- Sports in Montana
  - Category:Sports in Montana
    - commons:Category:Sports in Montana
  - Category:Sports venues in Montana
    - commons:Category:Sports venues in Montana
- Spring Meadow Lake State Park
- Springs in Montana
- State of Montana website
  - Government of the State of Montana
    - Category:Government of Montana
      - commons:Category:Government of Montana
- State forests in Montana
- State parks in Montana
- State police of Montana
- State prisons in Montana
- Structures in Montana
  - commons:Category:Buildings and structures in Montana
- Sturnella neglecta
- Granville Stuart
- Supreme Court of the State of Montana
- Swan River National Wildlife Refuge
- Symbols of the State of Montana:
  - Montana state ballad: "Montana Melody" website
  - Montana state bird: western meadowlark (Sturnella neglecta)
  - Montana state butterfly: mourning cloak (Nymphalis antiopa)
  - Montana state fish: blackspotted cutthroat trout (Oncorhynchus clarki lewisi)
  - Montana state flag: Flag of the State of Montana
  - Montana state flower: bitterroot (Lewisia rediviva)
  - Montana state fossil: duck-billed dinosaur (Maiasaura peeblesorum)
  - Montana state gems: sapphire and agate
  - Montana state grass: bluebunch wheatgrass (Agropyron spicatum)
  - Montana state mammal: grizzly bear (Ursus arctos horribilis)
  - Montana state motto: Oro y Plata (Spanish for Gold and Silver) website
  - Montana state nickname: Treasure State
  - Montana state seal: Great Seal of the State of Montana
  - Montana state slogan: Big Sky Country
  - Montana state song: "Montana"
  - Montana state tree: ponderosa pine (Pinus ponderosa

== T ==
Trapper Peak

- Telecommunications in Montana
  - commons:Category:Communications in Montana
- Telephone area codes in Montana
- Television stations in Montana
- Territory of Dakota, (1861–1863)-1889
- Territory of Idaho, (1863–1864)-1890
- Territory of Louisiana, 1805–1812
- Territory of Missouri, 1812–1821
- Territory of Montana, 1864–1889
- Territory of Nebraska, (1854–1861)-1867
- Territory of Oregon, (1848–1853)-1859
- Territory of Washington, (1853–1863)-1889
- Theatres in Montana
  - commons:Category:Theatres in Montana
- Timeline of pre-statehood Montana history
- Tourism in Montana (website)
  - commons:Category:Tourism in Montana
- Towns and cities in Montana
  - Towns in Montana
  - Cities in Montana
- Transportation in Montana
  - Category:Transportation in Montana
    - commons:Category:Transport in Montana
- Trapper Peak
- Travelers' Rest State Park
- Treasure State
- Treaty of Fort Laramie
- Tunnels in Montana
- TVMT

== U ==
- UL Bend National Wildlife Refuge
- UL Bend Wilderness
- Unincorporated communities in Montana
- United States of America
  - States of the United States of America
  - United States census statistical areas of Montana
  - Montana's congressional delegations
  - United States congressional districts in Montana
  - United States Court of Appeals for the Ninth Circuit
  - United States District Court for the District of Montana
  - United States representatives from Montana
  - United States senators from Montana
- Universities and colleges in Montana
- University of Montana System
- Upper Missouri River Breaks National Monument
- Ursus arctos horribilis
- US-MT – ISO 3166-2:US region code for the State of Montana

== V ==
- Virginia City, Montana Territory, territorial capital 1865-1875

== W ==
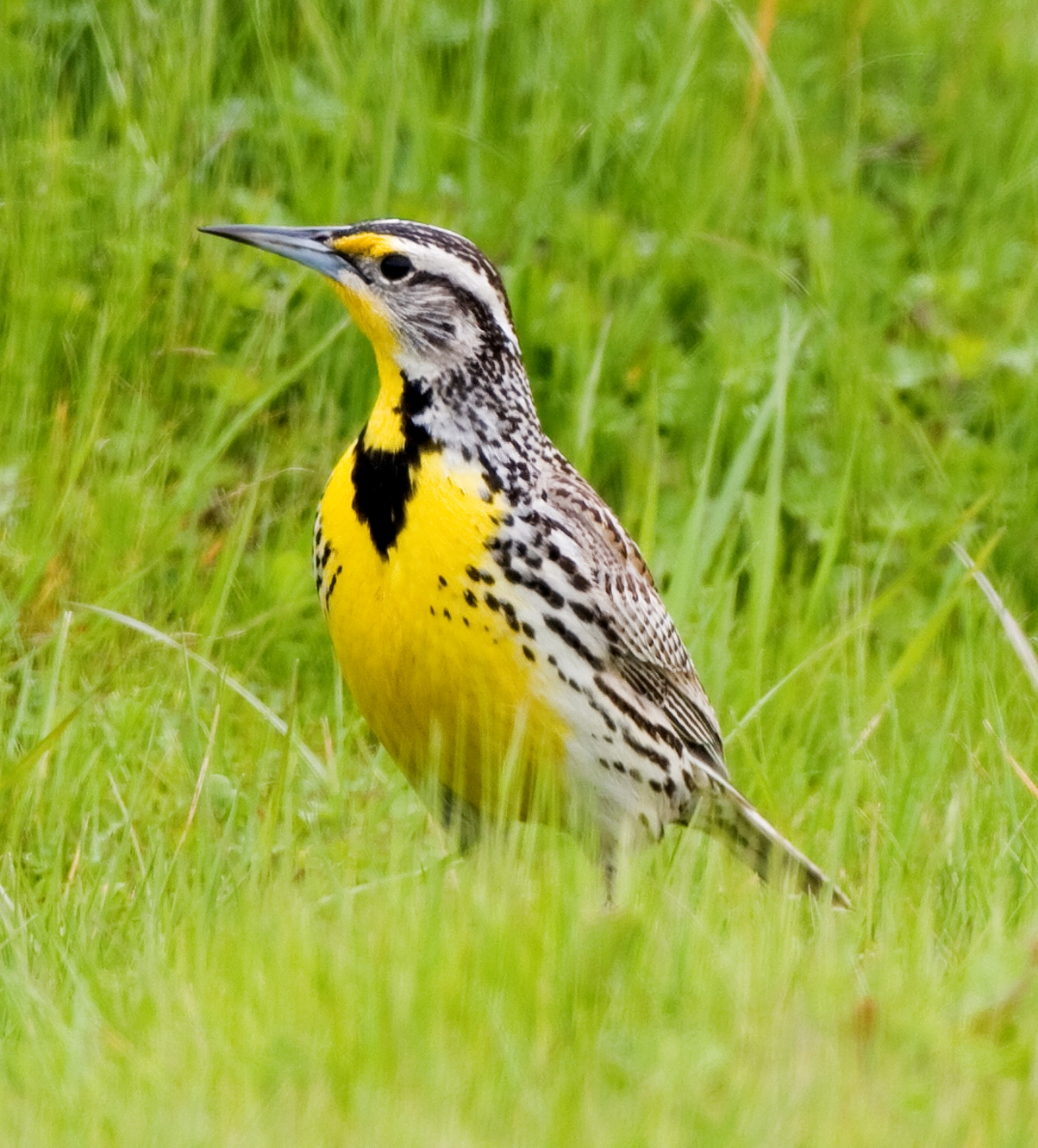
Western meadowlark

- War Horse National Wildlife Refuge
- Waterfalls of Montana
  - commons:Category:Waterfalls of Montana
- Waterton-Glacier International Peace Park
- Welcome Creek Wilderness
- Western meadowlark
  Wikimedia
  - Wikimedia Commons:Category:Montana
    - commons:Category:Maps of Montana
  - Wikinews:Category:Montana
    - Wikinews:Portal:Montana
  - Wikipedia Category:Montana
    - Wikipedia:WikiProject Montana
      - Category:WikiProject Montana articles
      - Wikipedia:WikiProject Montana#Members
- Wilderness areas of Montana
- William Clark
- Wind power in Montana
- Wines of Montana
- Writers of Montana
- Lester S. Willson

== Y ==
- Yellowstone National Park

== Z ==
- Zoos in Montana
  - commons:Category:Zoos in Montana

== See also ==
- Topic overview:
  - Montana
  - Outline of Montana
