= Outline of Montana =

Overview of and topical guide to Montana

The flag of Montana

The seal of Montana

The location of the State of Montana in the United States of America

The following outline is provided as an overview of and topical guide to the U.S. state of Montana:

Montana – fourth most extensive of the 50 states of the United States of America. Montana is the northernmost of the western Mountain States. The Territory of Montana joined the Union as the 41st state on November 8, 1889.

== General reference ==
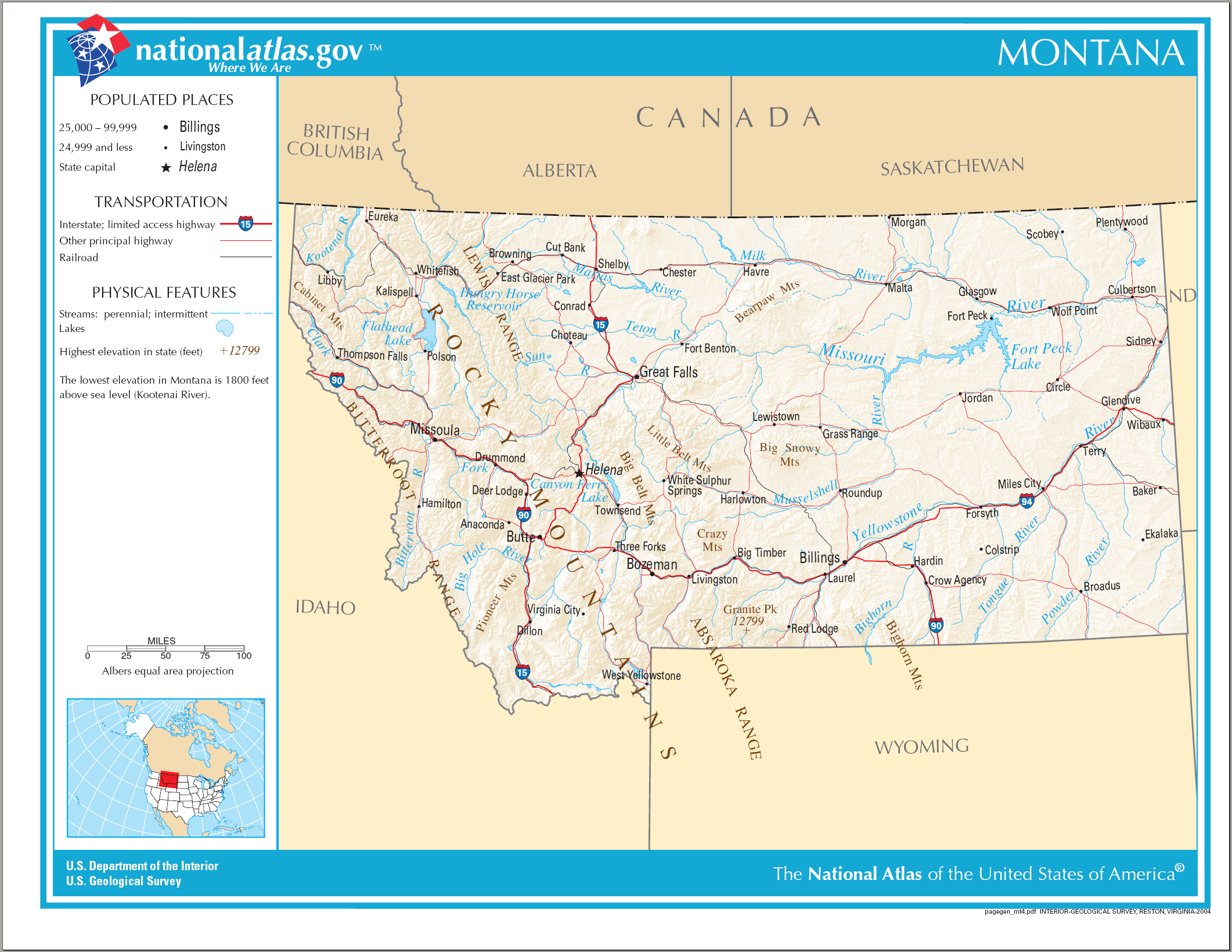
An enlargeable map of the State of Montana

- Names
  - Common name: Montana
    - Pronunciation: /mɒnˈtænə/
  - Official name: State of Montana
  - Abbreviations and name codes
    - Postal symbol: MT
    - ISO 3166-2 code: US-MT
    - Internet second-level domain: .mt.us
  - Nicknames
    - Big Sky Country (currently used on license plates)
    - The Last Best Place
    - Treasure State (previously used on license plates)
- Adjectival: Montana
- Demonym: Montanan

== Geography of Montana ==
Geography of Montana

- Montana is: a U.S. state, a federal state of the United States of America
- Location:
  - Northern Hemisphere
  - Western Hemisphere
    - Americas
      - North America
        - Anglo America
        - Northern America
          - United States of America
            - Contiguous United States
              - Canada–US border
              - Western United States
                - Mountain West United States
                - Northwestern United States
- Population of Montana: 989,415 (2010 U.S. Census)
- Area of Montana: 147,000 sq mi (380,800 km^{2})
- Atlas of Montana

=== Places in Montana ===
Places in Montana

- Historic places in Montana
  - Ghost towns in Montana
  - National Historic Landmarks in Montana
  - National Register of Historic Places listings in Montana
    - Bridges on the National Register of Historic Places in Montana
- National Natural Landmarks in Montana
- National parks in Montana
- State parks in Montana
- Montana Dinosaur Trail
- List of trails of Montana
- List of oil fields of Montana

=== Environment of Montana ===
- Climate of Montana
- Protected areas in Montana
  - Forests in Montana
- Superfund sites in Montana
- Wildlife of Montana
  - Flora of Montana
    - Club-mosses and Mosses of Montana
    - Coniferous plants of Montana
    - Lichens of Montana
    - Monocotyledons of Montana
    - Dicotyledons of Montana
  - Fauna of Montana
    - Birds of Montana
    - Clams and Mussels of Montana
    - Crustaceans of Montana
    - Mammals of Montana
    - Amphibians and Reptiles of Montana
    - Fish of Montana
    - Snails and Slugs of Montana

==== Natural geographic features of Montana ====
- Forests in Montana
- Islands of Montana
- Lakes of Montana
- Mountains of Montana
- Rapids in Montana
- Rivers of Montana
- Mountain passes in Montana (A-L)
- Mountain passes in Montana (M-Z)
- Waterfalls of Montana

=== Regions of Montana ===
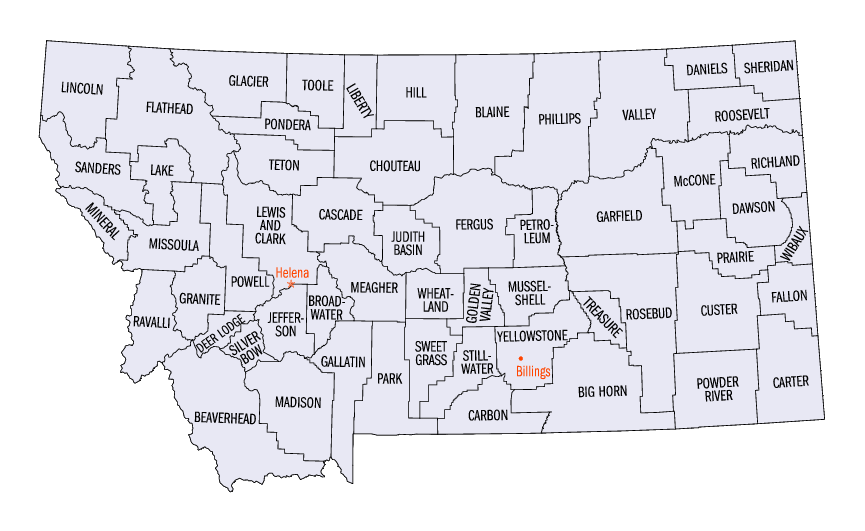
An enlargeable map of the 56 counties of the state of Montana

Regional designations of Montana

- Western Montana

==== Administrative divisions of Montana ====
- The 56 counties of the state of Montana
  - Municipalities in Montana
    - Cities in Montana
      - State capital of Montana: Helena
      - Largest city in Montana: Billings
      - City nicknames in Montana

=== Demography of Montana ===
Demographics of Montana

== Government and politics of Montana ==
Politics of Montana

- Form of government: U.S. state government
- Montana's congressional delegations
- Montana State Capitol
- Political party strength in Montana

=== Branches of the government of Montana ===
Government of Montana

==== Executive branch of the government of Montana ====
- Governor of Montana
  - Lieutenant Governor of Montana
  - Secretary of State of Montana
- State departments
  - Montana Department of Transportation
  - Montana Department of Fish, Wildlife and Parks

==== Legislative branch of the government of Montana ====
- Montana State Legislature (bicameral)
  - Upper house: Montana Senate
  - Lower house: Montana House of Representatives

==== Judicial branch of the government of Montana ====
Courts of Montana

- Supreme Court of Montana

=== Law and order in Montana ===
Law of Montana

- Cannabis in Montana
- Capital punishment in Montana
  - Individuals executed in Montana
- Constitution of Montana
- Crime in Montana
- Gun laws in Montana
- Law enforcement in Montana
  - Law enforcement agencies in Montana
- Baldwin v. Fish and Game Commission of Montana

=== Military in Montana ===
- Montana Air National Guard
- Montana Army National Guard
- Military installations

== History of Montana ==
- History of Montana
  - Timeline of Montana history
    - Timeline of pre-statehood Montana history
    - Timeline of Billings, Montana

=== History of Montana, by period ===
The location of the state of Montana in the United States of America

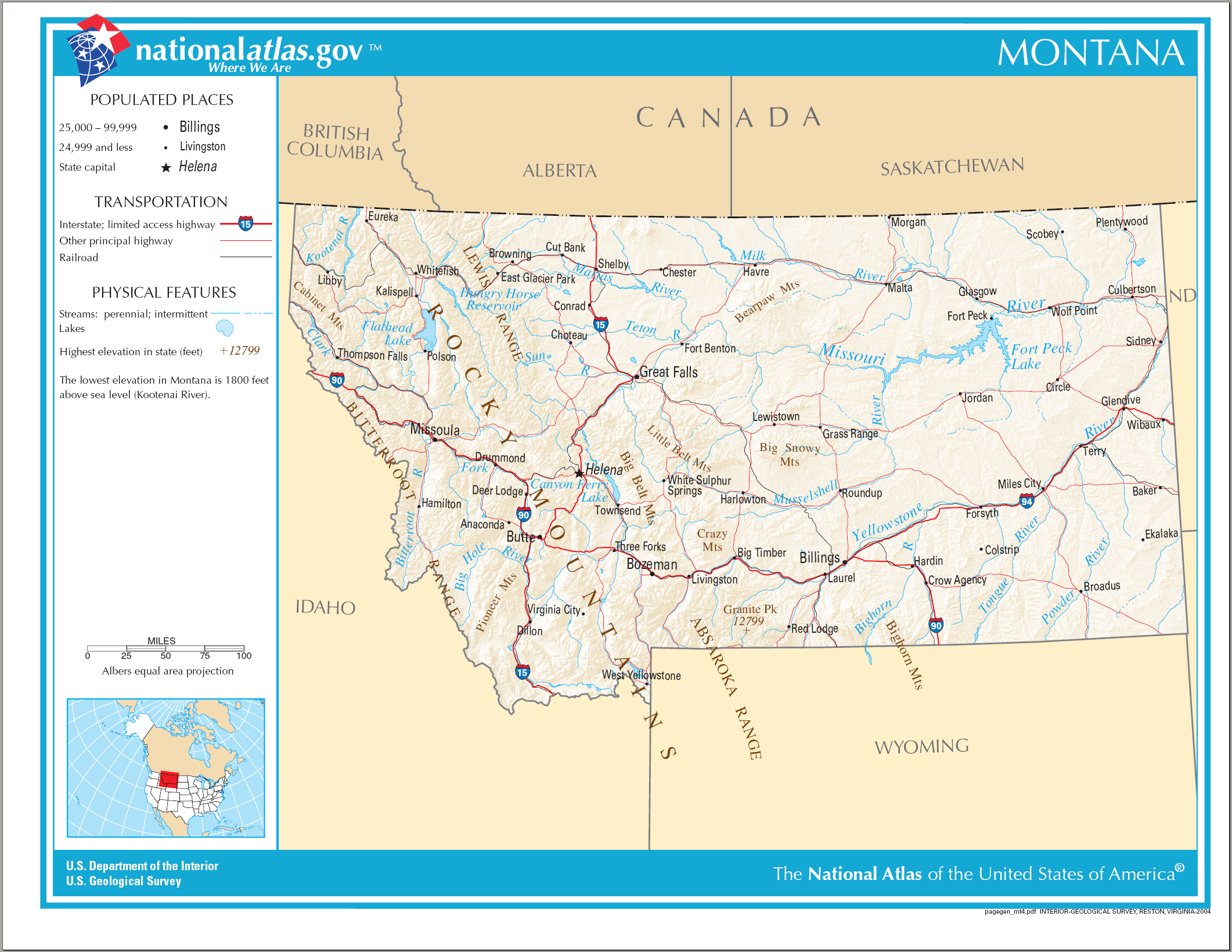
An enlargeable map of the state of Montana

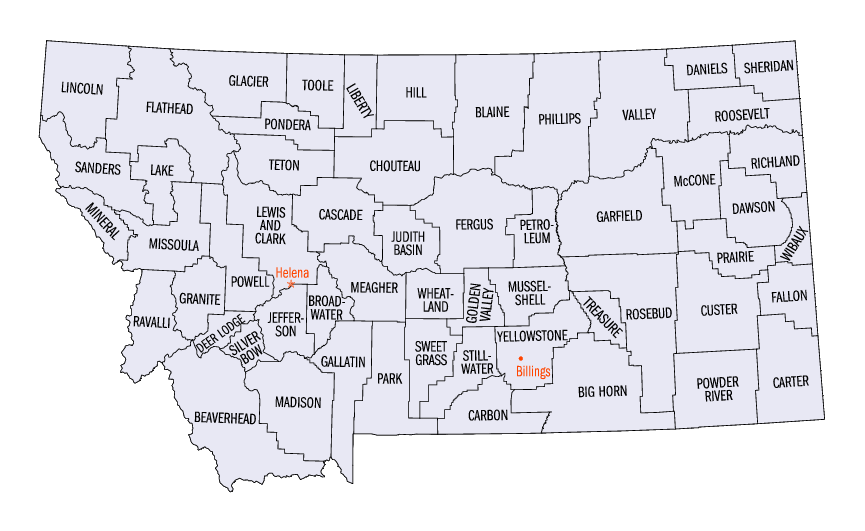
An enlargeable map of the 56 counties of the state of Montana

- Indigenous peoples
- English territory of Rupert's Land, 1670–1707
- French colony of Louisiane east of Continental Divide, 1699–1764
  - Treaty of Fontainebleau of 1762
- British territory of Rupert's Land, (1707–1818)-1870
- Spanish (though predominantly Francophone) district of Alta Luisiana east of Continental Divide, 1764–1803
  - Third Treaty of San Ildefonso of 1800
- French district of Haute-Louisiane east of Continental Divide, 1803
  - Louisiana Purchase of 1803
- Unorganized U.S. territory created by the Louisiana Purchase east of Continental Divide, 1803–1804
  - Lewis and Clark Expedition, 1804–1806
- District of Louisiana east of Continental Divide, 1804–1805
- Fur trade in Montana, 1806–1850s
- Territory of Louisiana east of Continental Divide, 1805–1812
- Territory of Missouri east of Continental Divide, 1812–1821
  - War of 1812, June 18, 1812 – March 23, 1815
    - Treaty of Ghent, December 24, 1814
  - Anglo-American Convention of 1818
- Oregon Country west of Continental Divide, 1818–1846
  - Provisional Government of Oregon, 1843–1848
  - Oregon Treaty of 1846
- Unorganized Territory east of Continental Divide, 1821–1854
  - Treaty of Fort Laramie of 1851
  - Mexican–American War, April 25, 1846 – February 2, 1848
- Territory of Oregon west of Continental Divide, 1848–1859
- Territory of Washington west of Continental Divide, (1853–1863)–1889
- Territory of Nebraska east of Continental Divide, (1854–1861)–1867
- Territory of Dakota east of Continental Divide, (1861–1863)–1889
- Territory of Idaho, (1863–1864)–1890
- Territory of Montana, 1864–1889
  - Montana pioneers
  - American Civil War, April 12, 1861 – May 13, 1865
    - Montana in the American Civil War
  - Red Cloud's War, 1866–1868
    - Treaty of Fort Laramie of 1868
  - Yellowstone National Park designated first United States National Park on March 1, 1872
    - Expeditions and the protection of Yellowstone (1869–1890)
  - Black Hills War, 1876–1877
    - Battle of the Rosebud, 1876
    - Battle of the Little Bighorn, 1876
  - Nez Perce War, 1877
- State of Montana becomes 41st state admitted to the United States of America on November 8, 1889

=== History of Montana, by region ===
- By city
  - History of Anaconda
  - History of Billings
  - History of Butte
  - History of Choteau
  - History of Colstrip
  - History of Columbia Falls
  - History of Conrad
  - History of Cut Bank
  - History of Deer Lodge
  - History of Dillon
  - History of East Helena
  - History of Forsyth
  - History of Fort Benton
  - History of Glasgow
  - History of Glendive
  - History of Great Falls
  - History of Hamilton
  - History of Hardin
  - History of Harlem
  - History of Harlowton
  - History of Havre
  - History of Helena
  - History of Kalispell
  - History of Laurel
  - History of Lewistown
  - History of Libby
  - History of Livingston
  - History of Malta
  - History of Miles City
  - History of Missoula
  - History of Plentywood
  - History of Polson
  - History of Poplar
  - History of Red Lodge
  - History of Ronan
  - History of Roundup
  - History of Scobey
  - History of Shelby
  - History of Sidney
  - History of Thompson Falls
  - History of Three Forks
  - History of Townsend
  - History of Troy
  - History of Whitefish
  - History of White Sulphur Springs
  - History of Wolf Point

=== History of Montana, by subject ===
- Fur trade in Montana
- Notable figures in Montana history
- Territorial evolution of Montana

=== History publications about Montana ===
- Bibliography of Montana history

== Culture of Montana ==
Culture of Montana

- Museums in Montana
- Religion in Montana
  - Episcopal Diocese of Montana
- Scouting in Montana
- State symbols of Montana
  - Flag of the state of Montana
  - Great Seal of the State of Montana

=== The Arts in Montana ===
- Music of Montana

=== Sports in Montana ===
Sports in Montana

== Economy and infrastructure of Montana ==
Economy of Montana

- Communications in Montana
  - Newspapers in Montana
  - Radio stations in Montana
  - Television stations in Montana
- Energy in Montana
  - Oil fields in Montana
  - Power stations in Montana
  - Solar power in Montana
  - Wind power in Montana
- Health care in Montana
  - Hospitals in Montana
- Manufacturing in Montana
  - Simms Fishing Products
- Transportation in Montana
  - Airports in Montana
- Water in Montana
  - List of dams and reservoirs in Montana
  - List of lakes in Montana
- Tunnels in Montana

== Education in Montana ==
Education in Montana

- Schools in Montana
  - School districts in Montana
    - High schools in Montana
  - Colleges and universities in Montana
    - University of Montana
    - Montana State University

== See also ==
- Topic overview:
  - Montana
  - Index of Montana-related articles
