= List of Montana state symbols =

Location of Montana in the United States

The following is a list of symbols of the U.S. state of Montana.

== Montana state symbols ==
Type	Symbol	Image
Motto	"Oro y Plata"	
Nickname	Treasure State, Big Sky Country	
Slogan	Land of the Shining Mountains, The Last Best Place	
Song	"Montana"	
Song	Ballad: "Montana Melody"	
Song	Lullaby: "Montana Lullaby"	
Flag	Flag of the State of Montana	
Seal	Great Seal of the State of Montana	
Coat of arms	Coat of arms of Montana	
National guard crest	Crest of the Montana National Guard	
Bird	Western meadowlark (Sturnella neglecta)	
Fish	Westslope cutthroat trout (Oncorhynchus clarki lewisi)	
Flower	Bitterroot (Lewisia rediviva)	
Grass	Bluebunch wheatgrass (Pseudoroegneria spicata)	
Insect	Mourning cloak butterfly (Nymphalis antiopa)	
Mammal	Grizzly bear (Ursus arctos horribilis)	
Tree	Ponderosa pine (Pinus ponderosa)	
Fossil	Duck-billed dinosaur (Maiasaura peeblesorum)	
Gemstone	Sapphire	
Gemstone	Montana moss agate	
Soil	Scobey	
Fruit	Huckleberry	

== See also ==
- List of Montana-related topics
- Lists of United States state insignia
- State of Montana
