= Apollos University =

American university

- Apollos University
- Motto: The Gateway to Your Future
- Type: Private for-profit online university
- Active: 2004–2024
- Accreditation: DEAC
- President: Scott Eidson
- Provost: Robin Westerik
- Location: Great Falls, Montana, United States; 47.504874°N 111.297008°W
- Colors: Red, Blue and Gold
- Mascot: Goldy the Bison
- Website: apollos.edu

Apollos University was a private for-profit online university headquartered in Great Falls, Montana. It was accredited by the Distance Education Accreditation Commission (DEAC).

== History ==
The university was founded in August 2004 as a non-profit university. However, it closed the non-profit corporation and reopened as a for-profit corporation in May, 2005. The new corporation was named Apollos University of California with a "doing business as" name of Apollos University. Formerly headquartered in Huntington Beach, California, Apollos University moved to Great Falls, Montana, on September 30, 2016. and is incorporated and approved as a private institution by the State of Montana.

Apollos University received its approval from the California Bureau for Private Postsecondary and Vocational Education (BPPVE) in July 2005 and enrolled its first student in September 2005. The university held its first graduation ceremony in July 2007. Apollos applied for accreditation in 2010 and received accreditation status in January 2012 from Distance Education and Training Council (DETC) which is now known as the Distance Education Accreditation Commission (DEAC). In 2020, DEAC renewed Apollos University's accreditation. In December 2024, the university closed.

Madison Education Group serves as the records retention and administration of academic records for Apollos University Alumni.

== Accreditation ==
Apollos University was an approved private institution by the State of Montana and was accredited by the Distance Education Accrediting Commission(DEAC).

== See also ==
- List of colleges and universities in Montana
