= 2012 Montana Legislative Referendum 121 =

Legislative Referendum 121
- Concerns the Denial of State Funded Services to Illegal Immigrants

Results
Choice	Votes	%
Yes	378,563	79.51%
No	97,528	20.49%
Valid votes	476,091	100.00%
Invalid or blank votes	0	0.00%
Total votes	476,091	100.00%
County results
Yes
>90%
80–90%
70–80%
60–70%

Montana Legislative Referendum 121 was a referendum held in Montana in 2012 that denied state funded services to illegal immigrants.

The electorate of Montana approved the measure in the 2012 general election by a vote of 378,563 votes for to 97,528 votes against. The Montana Immigrant Justice Alliance challenged the validity of the law shortly after it was approved by the electorate of Montana. In June 2014, a Montana State District Court invalidated significant portions of LR 121 on the grounds that LR 121 was an attempt to supersede a federal statute and an attempt to regulate immigration, a power specifically delegated to the federal government under the United States Constitution. The State of Montana has appealed the ruling to the Montana Supreme Court.
