= Music of Montana =

Montana is the 41st state to enter the United States, and has a culturally-diverse population representing a broad spectrum of music genre, style, and instrumentation.

Due to its migration patterns and place in the American West, Montana has a heritage of pioneer folk music and cowboy songs and poetry. The state also has a tradition of baroque, classical, and romantic era music: two prominent musical institutions, both classical, are the Great Falls Symphony Orchestra, which was established in 1958, and the Bozeman Symphony Orchestra, which was established in 1963. The Helena Symphony was founded in 1955 and is known to be one of the premier symphonies of Montana and the Northwest. The Billings Symphony and Chorus is the premier symphony in Montana, performing for the community throughout the year.

Montana has two official state songs: "Montana" and "Montana Melody."

== Native American music ==
Montana is home to several Indian reservations and traditionally to more than two dozen distinct tribes, each with their own forms of music. These include the Blackfeet, Crow, Flathead, Cheyenne, Chippewa-Cree, Gros Ventre, Assiniboine, and Sioux. An example of the modern synthesis of popular and traditional Native music in Montana is Jack Gladstone, a folk musician and lecturer/presenter who embraces Native themes, and who has collaborated with fellow Montana musician Rob Quist.

== Popular music and musicians ==
Montana country musicians include Rob Quist, formerly of the Mission Mountain Wood Band. The Bridger Creek Boys , of Bozeman, are a Bluegrass band that were finalists at the Telluride Bluegrass Festival's 2007 Best New Band Contest.

Other popular musicians from Montana include Seattle's Pearl Jam bassist Jeff Ament (who attended the University of Montana), and guitarist/producer Steve Albini. Grunge pioneer Bruce Fairweather is also from Montana.

Rock and roll musician Chan Romero of Billings is the writer of "Hippy Hippy Shake", a song that was often performed by The Beatles and was a hit for The Swinging Blue Jeans.

Another well known band includes Helena and Missoula's The Skoidats, who recorded on New York City's Moon Ska label in the late 1990s.

Lead singer Colin Meloy and members of the Portland band The Decemberists are from Montana, and were in a band named after the small town of Tarkio, in Mineral County. Meloy graduated from the University of Montana in 1998. Seattle's Modest Mouse lead singer Isaac Brock was born in Helena.

Country singer Doug Adkins was born in Havre. Country singer Randy Rhoads was born in Wolf Point, Montana and lived in Malta throughout most of his career as a recording artist for Blue Ridge Records. He appeared on TNN's Nashville Now with Ralph Emery twice.

John Mayer visited and fell in love with Livingston, where he bought a house and re-settled in the spring of 2012. His album Paradise Valley is named for where he lives in Montana and features country music influences.

One of Montana's favorite modern era rock bands is Dawghouse from Helena. Jared Blake, Nashville singer/songwriter, finalist from season 1 of The Voice, sings about the beautiful Montana Skies in his song "Oak Tree" and the video was filmed in Montana. It features the Montana-based Bikers Against Bullies USA non-profit organization and their national anti-bullying campaign.

The largest, indoor concert venue in Montana is the MetraPark Arena, which opened in 1975 in Billings.

== Notable songs about Montana ==
- Wild Montana Skies by John Denver
- Montana Lullaby by Ken Overcast
- Me and My Gang by Rascal Flatts
- Montana by Frank Zappa
- Livingston Saturday Night by Jimmy Buffett
- Montana on My Mind by Shane Close
- Twodot Montana by Hank Williams Jr.
- Cut Bank, Montana by Hank Williams Jr.
- A Horse Called Music by Willie Nelson & Merle Haggard
- Meet Me in Montana by Marie Osmond & Dan Seals
- Big City by Merle Haggard
- Home is Where Montana Is by Bruce Anfison
- Montana by Charles C. Cohan
- I'll Wait for You by Joe Nichols
- Goodnight, Montana by Dave Walburn
- Montana Rodeo by Chris LeDoux
- Midnight in Missoula by Nanci Griffith
- Montana by Sons of the Pioneers
- Showdown At Big Sky by Robbie Robertson
- Montana by John Linnell
- Big Sky Country by Acoustic Alchemy
- Blue Mountain Skies by Riders In The Sky
- Montana Sky by White Heart
- Hey Montana by Eve 6
- Girl From Montana by The Henderson Sisters

== Electronic ==
Electronic music composer Ruth Anderson was born in Kalispell.

== Independent music scene ==
In the Flathead Valley, some of the more popular acts are Marshall Catch (country tinged-rock), Luke Dowler (rock/singer-songwriter), God Fearing Women, and The Rockaholics.

== Music education ==
Post-secondary educational institutions which offer a program or major in music include the University of Montana, Montana State University, Montana State University Billings, and Rocky Mountain College.
