= Montana Cost of Public Education =

The cost of public education in Montana ranks 24th in the United States in the 2011-2012 school year on cost per pupil (K-12). The national average expenditure per pupil in the 2011-12 school year was $10,834. The expenditure per pupil in 2012 was $10,400 a -0.84% decrease from 2011's expenditure per pupil of $10,488. The breakdown of costs is: Instruction 53%, Student Services 8.8%, General Administration 5.3%, Building Administration 5.2%, Building Operation Maintenance 9.9%, Pupil Transportation 5.5%, Other Expenses 6.8%, Bonds and Facilities 5.6%.

The revenue per student in 2010 for Montana was $10,905 ranking 29th in the country. The national average in 2010 was $11,871 per student. The revenue per student in 2011 for Montana was $11,268 ranking 28th in the country. The national average in 2011 was $11,946 per student.

The numbers of hours of instruction required by law in Montana are 1,080 for 4-12 and 720 for K-3. This breaks down to an average of $9.63 per hour of instruction for a 1,080 hour school year. There are currently 824 public schools in Montana: 439 Elementary, 214 Middle Schools (7-8), and 171 High Schools (9-12).

Montana's fall enrollment for the 2012-2013 school year was 95,812 in elementary and 43,015 for secondary with a total of 138,827 students. With an estimated cost of educating each student at $10,645 for 2013 the total estimated expenditure would be $1,477,848,000. No data is currently available for the 2014 school year.

In 2011 Montana ranked 41st in average instructional staff salaries in public schools at $48,546 per year. The national average for the 2011-2012 year is $57,218. Montana did see a 3.0% (3rd highest) increase in average salaries of public school teachers from the 2010-11 to 2011-12 school years. Montana also saw a 10.6% increase in average salaries of public school teachers from the 2001-02 to 2011-12 school years. This increase tied New York for the 5th highest increase over the time period.
