= Montana statistical areas =

Coordinates: 47.0527°N 109.6333°W

The U.S. State of Montana currently has seven statistical areas that have been delineated by the Office of Management and Budget (OMB). On July 21, 2023, the OMB delineated five metropolitan statistical areas and two micropolitan statistical areas in Montana. As of 2025, the largest of these is the Billings, MT MSA, comprising the area surrounding Montana's largest city of Billings.

== Statistical areas ==
The Office of Management and Budget (OMB) has designated more than 1,000 statistical areas for the United States and Puerto Rico. These statistical areas are important geographic delineations of population clusters used by the OMB, the United States Census Bureau, planning organizations, and federal, state, and local government entities.

The OMB defines a core-based statistical area (commonly referred to as a CBSA) as the county or counties (or county-equivalents) surrounding at least one densely-settled core of at least 10,000 population, "plus adjacent counties having a high degree of social and economic integration with the core as measured through commuting ties with the counties containing the core". The OMB further divides core-based statistical areas based on population into metropolitan statistical areas (MSAs) for those with at least 50,000 and micropolitan statistical areas (μSAs) for those with 10,000 to 49,999 people.

The OMB defines a combined statistical area (CSA) as two or more adjacent core-based statistical areas where the employment interchange rate (% commuting from A to B plus % commuting from B to A) is at least 15%. The primary statistical areas (PSAs) include all combined statistical areas and any core-based statistical area that is not a constituent of a combined statistical area.

The seven United States statistical areas and 56 counties of the State of Montana
Core-based statistical area	2025 population (est.)	County	2025 population (est.)
Billings, MT MSA	193,603	Yellowstone County, Montana	172,692
Billings, MT MSA	193,603	Carbon County, Montana	11,466
Billings, MT MSA	193,603	Stillwater County, Montana	9,445
Bozeman, MT MSA	128,740	Gallatin County, Montana	128,740
Missoula, MT MSA	128,698	Missoula County, Montana	123,513
Missoula, MT MSA	128,698	Mineral County, Montana	5,185
Kalispell, MT μSA	115,429	Flathead County, Montana	115,429
Helena, MT MSA	97,153	Lewis and Clark County, Montana	75,331
Helena, MT MSA	97,153	Jefferson County, Montana	13,329
Helena, MT MSA	97,153	Broadwater County, Montana	8,493
Great Falls, MT MSA	85,029	Cascade County, Montana	85,029
Butte-Silver Bow, MT μSA	36,118	Silver Bow County, Montana	36,118
none		Ravalli County, Montana	48,582
none		Lake County, Montana	33,392
none		Lincoln County, Montana	22,328
none		Park County, Montana	18,214
none		Hill County, Montana	16,167
none		Sanders County, Montana	14,062
none		Glacier County, Montana	13,463
none		Big Horn County, Montana	12,752
none		Custer County, Montana	12,034
none		Fergus County, Montana	11,825
none		Richland County, Montana	11,377
none		Roosevelt County, Montana	10,242
none		Beaverhead County, Montana	10,043
none		Madison County, Montana	10,026
none		Deer Lodge County, Montana	9,709
none		Dawson County, Montana	8,692
none		Rosebud County, Montana	8,253
none		Valley County, Montana	7,385
none		Powell County, Montana	7,157
none		Blaine County, Montana	6,860
none		Teton County, Montana	6,496
none		Pondera County, Montana	6,072
none		Chouteau County, Montana	5,865
none		Musselshell County, Montana	5,582
none		Toole County, Montana	5,211
none		Phillips County, Montana	4,203
none		Sweet Grass County, Montana	3,762
none		Granite County, Montana	3,658
none		Sheridan County, Montana	3,436
none		Fallon County, Montana	2,959
none		Judith Basin County, Montana	2,162
none		Meagher County, Montana	2,137
none		Wheatland County, Montana	2,100
none		Liberty County, Montana	1,957
none		Powder River County, Montana	1,781
none		McCone County, Montana	1,720
none		Daniels County, Montana	1,612
none		Carter County, Montana	1,383
none		Garfield County, Montana	1,148
none		Prairie County, Montana	1,112
none		Wibaux County, Montana	885
none		Golden Valley County, Montana	844
none		Treasure County, Montana	728
none		Petroleum County, Montana	548
State of Montana			1,144,694

The seven core-based statistical areas of the State of Montana
2025 rank	Core-based statistical area	Population				
2025 rank	Core-based statistical area	2025 estimate	Change	2020 Census	Change	2010 Census
1	Billings, MT MSA	193,603	+5.12%	184,167	+10.17%	167,167
2	Bozeman, MT MSA	128,740	+8.22%	118,960	+32.90%	89,513
3	Missoula, MT MSA	128,698	+5.10%	122,457	+7.87%	113,522
4	Kalispell, MT μSA	115,429	+10.61%	104,357	+14.77%	90,928
5	Helena, MT MSA	97,153	+8.15%	89,832	+11.71%	80,413
6	Great Falls, MT MSA	85,029	+0.73%	84,414	+3.80%	81,327
7	Butte-Silver Bow, MT μSA	36,118	+2.80%	35,133	+2.73%	34,200

== See also ==
- Geography of Montana
  - Demographics of Montana
