= Flag of Montana =

U.S. state flag

Montana
- Use: Civil and state flag
- Proportion: 2:3
- Adopted: July 1, 1981; 45 years ago
- Design: The Great Seal of the State of Montana on a blue field. Above the seal the text “MONTANA” in yellow.

The flag of the U.S. state of Montana consists of the state's name above the state seal centered on a blue field. The flag was adopted in 1905, largely resembling a flag made by Harry Kessler in 1895 (later given to the First Montana Volunteers during the Spanish-American war). In 1981, the original design was modified to include the state’s name above the seal, and in 1985, the font was standardized as Helvetica Bold.

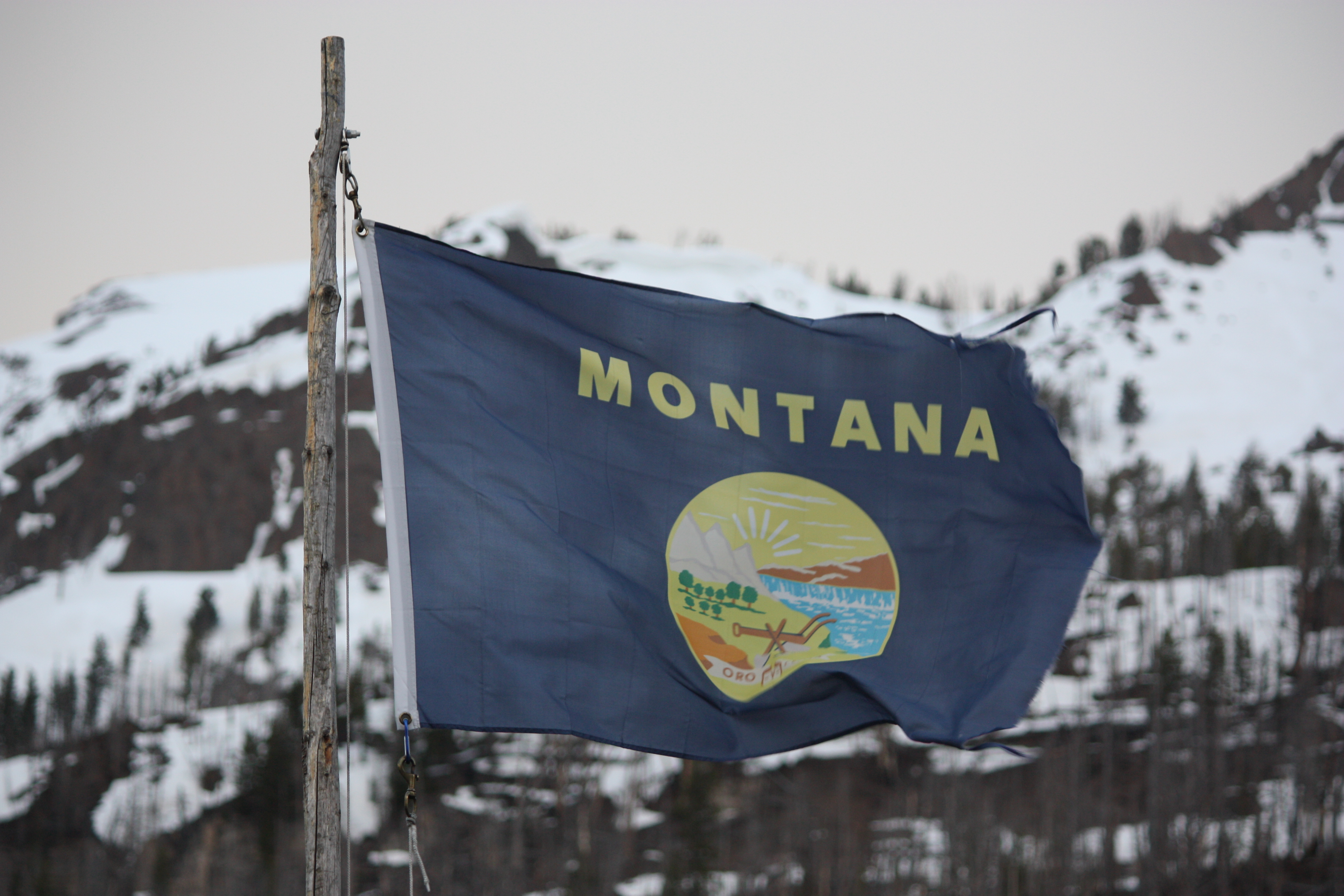
The flag flying

== Design ==
Under Montana Code 1-1-502, the state flag of Montana is established as follows:

The state flag of Montana shall be a flag having a blue field with a representation of the great seal of the state in the center and with golden fringe along the upper and lower borders of the flag; the same being the flag borne by the 1st Montana Infantry, U.S.V., in the Spanish-American War, with the exception of the device, “1st Montana Infantry, U.S.V.”; and above the great seal of the state shall be the word “MONTANA” in helvetica bold letters of gold color equal in height to one-tenth of the total vertical measurement of the blue field.

=== Design of the seal ===
The seal’s outer ring bears the words “The Great Seal of the State of Montana,” while the inner scene shows mountains, plains, and forests near the Great Falls of the Missouri River, with a plow, pick, and shovel representing agriculture and mining. The banner below reads the motto Oro y Plata, meaning “Gold and Silver” in Spanish.

== Gallery ==
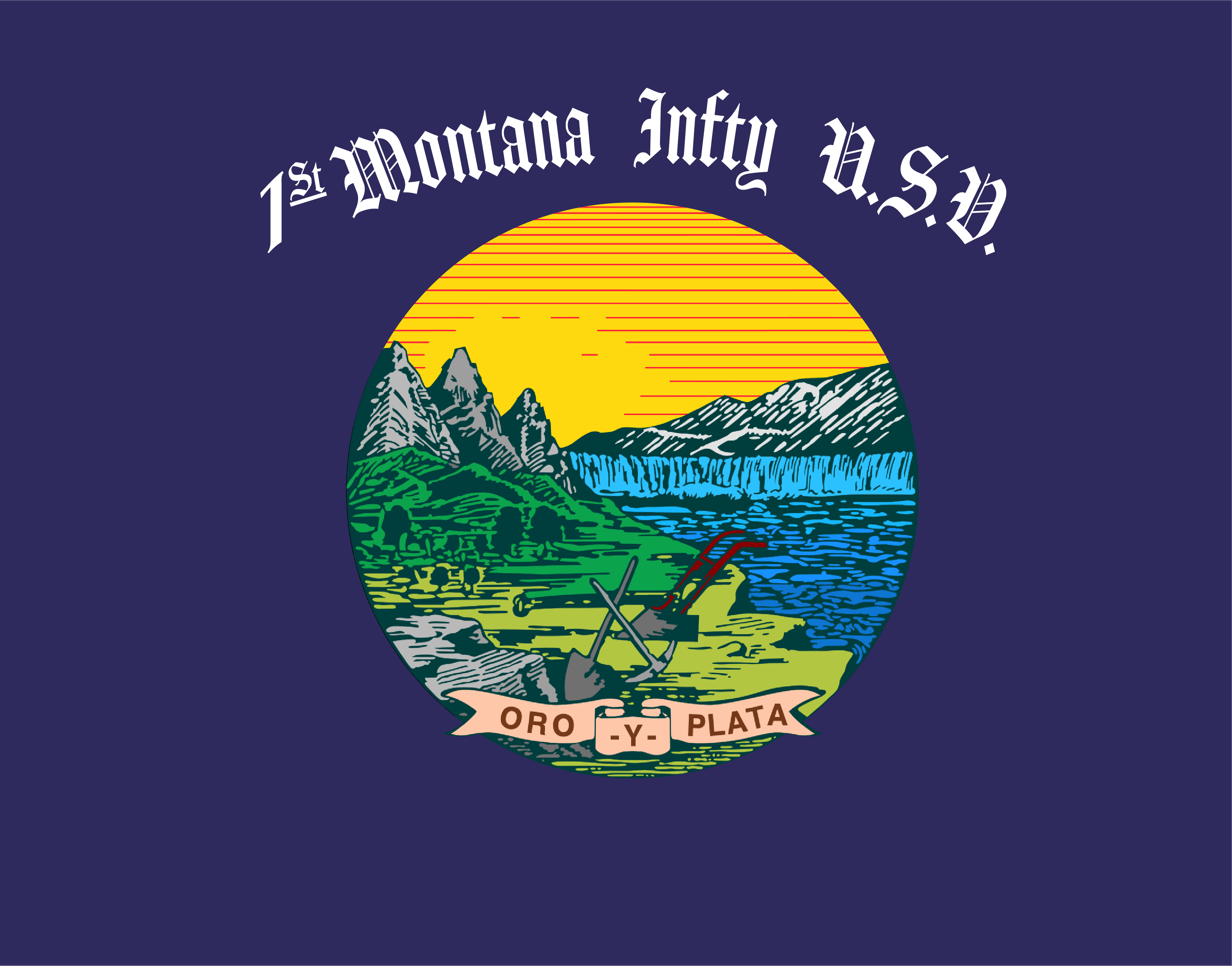
Flag carried by the First Montana Volunteers, 1898

Former state flag of Montana (1905–1981)

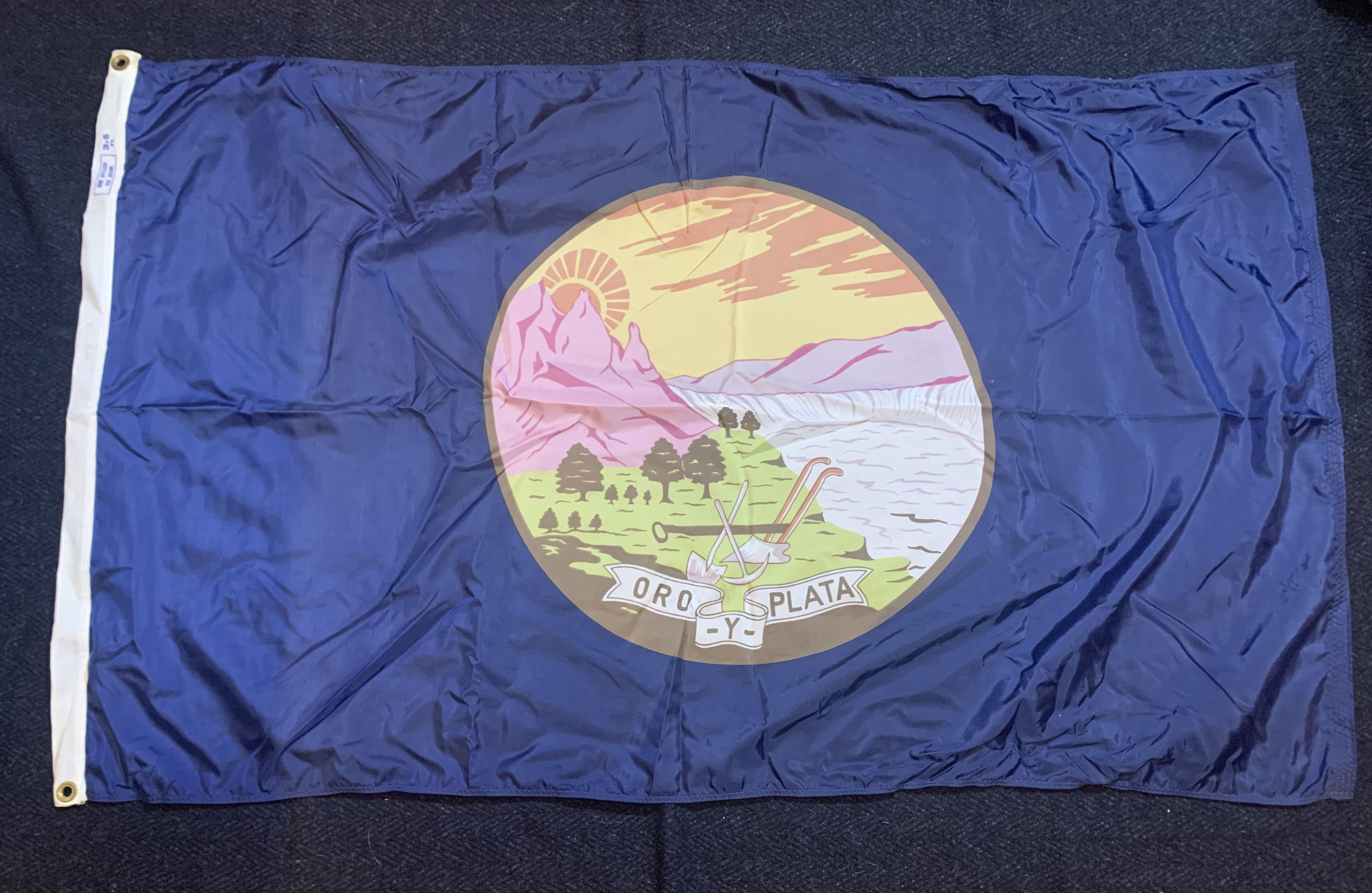
Former state flag in a 3:5 ratio

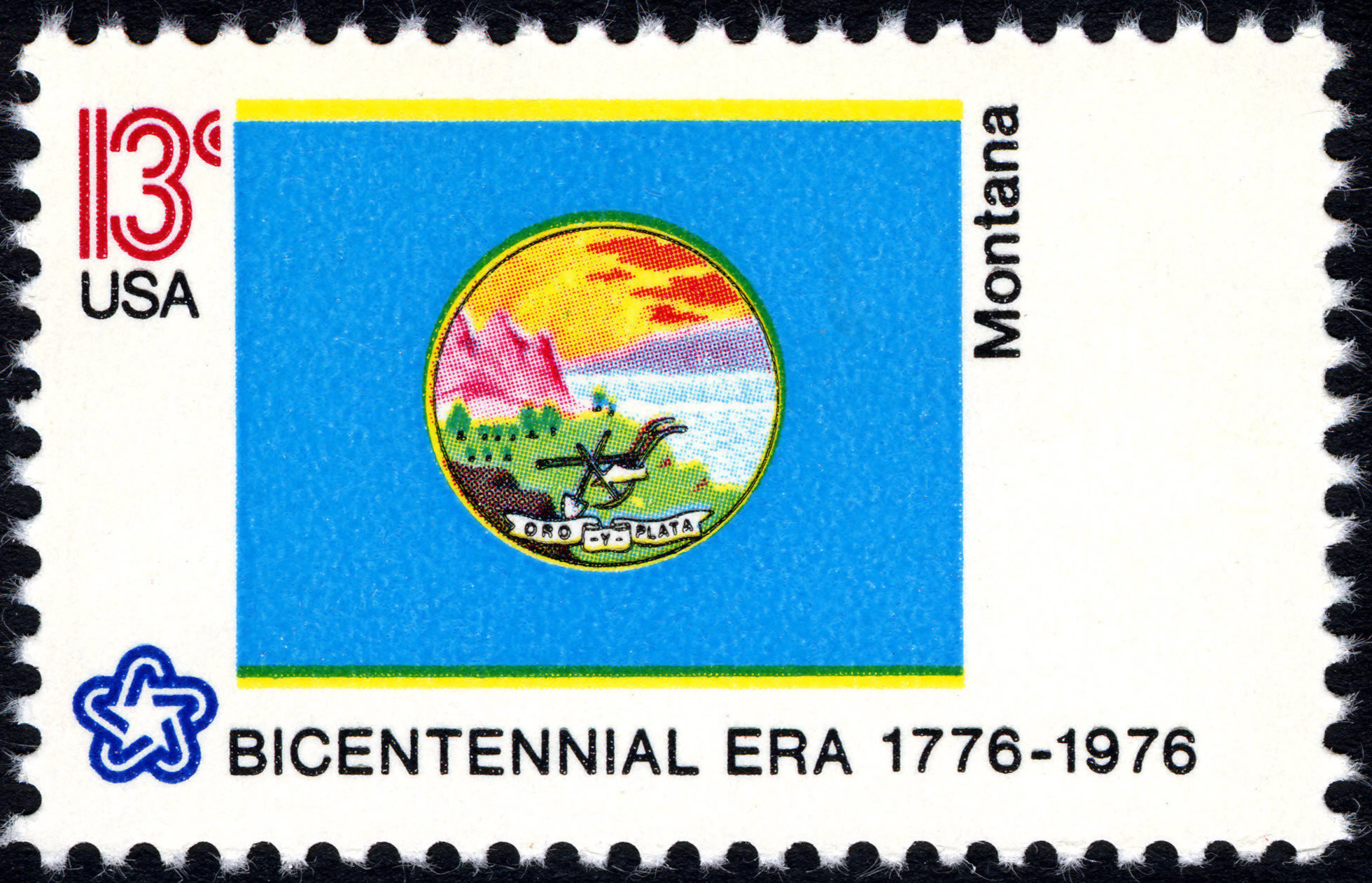
The 1905 Montana state flag as depicted in the 1976 bicentennial postage stamp series

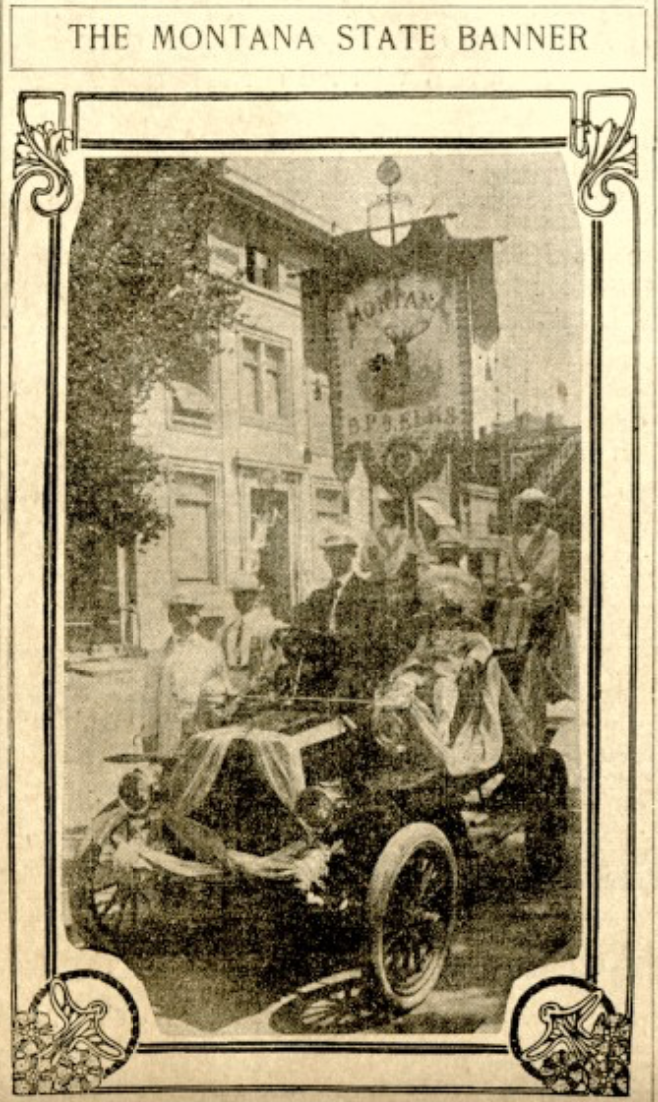
Montana state banner from 1906

== Proposed changes ==
In 2001, the North American Vexillological Association (NAVA) surveyed its members on the designs of 72 Canadian provincial flags and U.S. state and territorial flags; Montana’s flag was ranked 70th, the third lowest.

Proposed by James Croft in 1974.

In 1974, the Montana Legislature considered adopting a new flag to replace the 1905 design. The first design submitted for proposal had a white field with three stylized mountain peaks of black in the upper hoist, and a green horizontal stripe along the bottom. The second proposal was designed by James Croft and featured a blue stripe representing Montana’s "Big Sky State" nickname, a white stripe for the state’s pure rivers, and a green stripe symbolizing forests and fields. A stylized mountain silhouette symbolized the "Land of Shining Mountains" and the Spanish word montaña (mountainous), while a copper arrowhead at the staff finial honored Montana’s Indigenous heritage. However, on February 8, 1975, the Senate rejected Croft's proposal by a vote of 30-19, postponing further flag redesign considerations for at least a year.

Proposed by Edward Mooney and friends in 1979.

In 1979, Edward Mooney, an undergraduate at Montana State University, along with friends, designed another alternative flag. The design featured a green bottom third to represent Montana’s productive land and a blue top two-thirds for the “Big Sky” slogan, separated by a white line that formed an "M" on the left side, symbolizing both Montana and the state’s geographic divide between the Rocky Mountains in the west and Great Plains in the east. A white five-pointed star above the “M” symbolized Montana’s statehood, while the white color also represented the snows of winter. Mooney and his group presented the design to Governor Thomas Lee Judge and members of the Montana Legislature, with all parties refusing to consider the change.

In 2021, Democratic Rep. Moffie Funk proposed a bill to study the possibility of designing a new state flag, with an emphasis on evaluating whether the flag truly represents Montana's diversity and magnificence. Republican Rep. Caleb Hinkle then proposed an amendment to Funk's bill that would add firearms to the state flag as a tribute to Montana’s history with pioneers, soldiers, Native tribes, and hunters. His design concept suggested including semi-automatic rifles, such as the AR-15, but it faced strong criticism, including from Democratic Rep. Jonathan Windy Boy of the Chippewa Cree tribe. Windy Boy pointed out the negative historical associations of firearms for Native Americans, and lawmakers ultimately voted against Hinkle’s amendment, with only 12 in favor and 88 opposed. Funk’s original proposal to create a committee to consider a new design also failed with a vote of 37-63.

== Territorial Flag ==
During the World Cotton Centennial in 1885 the territory had their own exhibit. It was a building measuring 54 x 85 feet and displayed as state's minerals. On each of the four corners of the building were the territorial flags, they bore the word "Montana" with the territorial seal in the center measuring 4 feet in diameter.

Territorial flag, 1887-1889, pre description

In September of 1887, the territorial legislature officially adopted a flag. It had a field of blue with a white ring around the coat of arms of the territory.

== See also ==
- Symbols of the state of Montana
