= Big Sky Pride =

Annual gay pride celebration in Montana, U.S.

- Status: Active
- Genre: Pride parade
- Location: Montana
- Country: USA
- Inaugurated: 1993

Big Sky Pride is the current gay pride celebration held annually in Montana. Known as the Montana Pride Celebration from 2004–2013, Big Sky Pride took over from the Montana Pride Network in 2014.

The event often includes participation from local businesses, drag queens, non-profits, churches, and politicians. Though the event is often a venue for political organization, the event's organizers have noted that the celebratory aspect is equally important. The earliest Pride events in Montana were small local events drawing a few dozen people. The most recent event in 2021 drew over 8,000 participants.

== History ==
=== Origins ===
Beginning in 1993, various groups organized Pride celebrations and protests across the state. According to a speech by state senator Diane Sands, the original 1993 pride movement faced harassment such as having eggs thrown at them, and then-city councilwoman and former Helena mayor Colleen McCarthy recounted the backlash from constituents that year, including a physical attack from two men who were stopped by police. Only early pride event in Kalispell had only 30 attendees, compared to several hundred in 2009. Before 2004, yearly Pride events with political protests calling for equal rights for LGBTQ Montanans were organized primarily by the Montana Human Rights Network and happened yearly in the state capital and often in other cities. The last large counter-protest occurred in 2010.

From 2004 to 2013, the Montana Pride Celebration held by the Montana Pride Network was a three-day event, usually over a weekend in June. Events typically included a parade, festival, dances and musical events. Because of Montana's relatively small and dispersed population, Montana Pride served as a single event for the state as a whole, rotating among the state's larger towns from year to year. The celebration was held in Missoula in 2004, Helena in 2005 and 2006, Billings in 2007 and 2008, Kalispell in 2009 and 2010, Bozeman in 2011 and 2012, and Butte in 2013. In March 2014, the Montana Pride Network collapsed and canceled the pride celebration in Butte for 2014.

=== Big Sky Pride ===
In 2014, Big Sky Pride took over and held a festival in Butte that June, with 2015's festival in Missoula and 2016's in Great Falls.

Though the event had always been political, the 2017 event in Billings noted its partnerships with local businesses, with over 30 sponsors (including national corporations), and support from the local Democratic Socialists of America and Libertarian Party of the United States on top of the usual appearances from local Democrats. The 2018 event in Helena had notable historical themes. Many state politicians made speeches about the history of the Montanan pride movement, while counter-protestors from the Fellowship Baptist Church in Sidney attempted to disrupt the speeches. After 2017, a spin-off parade in Billings has been held by the non-profit organization 406 Pride.

Big Sky Pride had its largest parade thus far in 2019, with over 4,000 parade participates and 2,500 spectators in downtown Helena.

After the 2020 event was canceled due to COVID-19 concerns, the 2021 event was held in Helena, and it featured other nonprofit and human rights organizations and supportive speeches from Helena's mayor Wilmot Collins and state representative Moffie Funk. Local media noted that the event came on the heels of several anti-LGBT bills passing in the most recent state legislative session; however, the event was estimated to have attracted over 8,000 participants, a large increase over the last event in 2019.

The event has nods to the area's rural roots through events like rodeo-themed parties.

== See also ==
- Pride parade
