= Montanan =

A Montanan is a resident of the U.S. state of Montana.

Montanan may also refer to:

- Montanan (magazine), the University of Montana's alumni magazine
- SS Montanan, a cargo ship

== See also ==
- Montana (disambiguation)
