= List of colleges and universities in Montana =

The following is a list of colleges and universities in the U.S. state of Montana.

== Institutions ==
=== Four-year Institutions ===
| School | Location | Control | Carnegie Classification | Enrollment (fall 2024) | Founded |
|---|---|---|---|---|---|
| Montana State University | Bozeman | Public | Doctoral university | 17,135 | 1893 |
| Montana State University Billings | Billings | Public | Masters University | 4,129 | 1927 |
| Montana State University–Northern | Havre | Public | Baccalaureate college | 966 | 1929 |
| University of Montana | Missoula | Public | Doctoral University | 10,811 | 1893 |
| Montana Technological University | Butte | Public | Doctoral University | 1,702 | 1900 |
| University of Montana Western | Dillon | Public | Baccalaureate college | 1,358 | 1893 |
| Carroll College | Helena | Private (Not For Profit) | Baccalaureate college | 1,156 | 1909 |
| University of Providence | Great Falls | Private (Not For Profit) | Masters University | 763 | 1932 |
| Rocky Mountain College | Billings | Private (Not For Profit) | Masters University | 1,032 | 1878 |
| Charisma University | Billings | Private (Not For Profit) | Doctoral University | 500 | 2011 |

==== Two-year Institutions ====
- Dawson Community College, two-year college in Glendive
- Flathead Valley Community College, two-year college in Kalispell
- Great Falls College Montana State University, two-year technical college in Great Falls
- Helena College University of Montana, two-year technical college in Helena
- Highlands College of Montana Tech, two-year college in Butte
- Miles Community College, two-year college in Miles City

==== Tribal colleges ====
- Aaniiih Nakoda College, Harlem
- Blackfeet Community College, Browning
- Chief Dull Knife College, Lame Deer
- Fort Peck Community College, Poplar
- Little Big Horn College, Crow Agency
- Salish Kootenai College, Pablo
- Stone Child College, Box Elder

==== Defunct colleges ====
- Apollos University, Great Falls (2004-2024)
- Big Sky Bible College, Fergus County (1970s-1980s)
- Butte Business College, Butte (1890-1975)
- College of Montana, Deer Lodge (1878-1916)
- Montana Wesleyan University, Helena (1889-1923)

== See also ==
- List of college athletic programs in Montana
- Higher education in the United States
- List of American institutions of higher education
- List of recognized higher education accreditation organizations
- List of colleges and universities
- List of colleges and universities by country
