= List of rapids of Montana =

There are 34 named rapids in Montana. A rapid is a section of a river where the river bed has a relatively steep gradient causing an increase in water velocity and turbulence. A rapid is a hydrological feature between a run (a smoothly flowing part of a stream) and a cascade. A rapid is characterised by the river becoming shallower and having some rocks exposed above the flow surface. As flowing water splashes over and around the rocks, air bubbles become mixed in with it and portions of the surface acquire a white colour, forming what is called "whitewater". Rapids occur where the bed material is highly resistant to the erosive power of the stream in comparison with the bed downstream of the rapids.

- Big Horn River
  - Sitting Bull Rapids, Big Horn County, Montana, 45°37′47″N 107°40′23″W, el. 2,943 feet (897 m)
- Clark Fork River
  - Thibideau Rapids, Missoula County, Montana, 46°57′12″N 113°37′17″W, el. 3,478 feet (1,060 m)
- Missouri River
  - Baker Rapids, Prairie County, Montana, 46°42′30″N 105°28′32″W, el. 2,215 feet (675 m)
  - Bear Rapids, Blaine County, Montana, 47°43′29″N 109°27′11″W, el. 2,375 feet (724 m)
  - Bird Rapids, Blaine County, Montana, 47°46′48″N 109°09′43″W, el. 2,326 feet (709 m)
  - Black Bluff Rapids, Chouteau County, Montana, 47°54′43″N 110°28′18″W, el. 2,559 feet (780 m)
  - Brunots Rapids, Cascade County, Montana, 47°10′00″N 111°50′03″W, el. 3,389 feet (1,033 m)
  - Budels Rapids, Blaine County, Montana, 47°47′43″N 109°05′23″W, el. 2,313 feet (705 m)
  - Castle Bluff Rapids, Blaine County, Montana, 47°47′38″N 109°15′04″W, el. 2,342 feet (714 m)
  - Castle Bluffs Rapids, Blaine County, Montana, 47°47′38″N 109°14′26″W, el. 2,336 feet (712 m)
  - Dauphin Rapids, Fergus County, Montana, 47°44′36″N 109°22′47″W, el. 2,359 feet (719 m)
  - Deadman Rapids, Chouteau County, Montana, 47°43′14″N 109°41′43″W, el. 2,411 feet (735 m)
  - Flennikens Rapids, Cascade County, Montana, 47°10′15″N 111°49′11″W, el. 3,396 feet (1,035 m)
  - Gallatin Rapids, Fergus County, Montana, 47°43′43″N 109°27′58″W, el. 2,375 feet (724 m)
  - Heron Rapids, Sanders County, Montana, location unknown, 6,450 feet (1,970 m)
  - Holmes Rapids, Chouteau County, Montana, 47°44′54″N 109°34′32″W, el. 2,415 feet (736 m)
  - Kipps Rapids, Chouteau County, Montana, 47°51′31″N 110°04′21″W, el. 2,474 feet (754 m)
  - Little Dog Rapids, Blaine County, Montana, 47°43′15″N 109°25′21″W, el. 2,369 feet (722 m)
  - Lone Pine Rapids, Blaine County, Montana, 47°47′34″N 109°16′21″W, el. 2,349 feet (716 m)
  - Lone Pine Rapids, Cascade County, Montana, 47°10′40″N 111°48′43″W, el. 3,379 feet (1,030 m)
  - Magpie Rapids, Blaine County, Montana, 47°47′35″N 109°12′58″W, el. 2,333 feet (711 m)
  - McKeevers Rapids, Blaine County, Montana, 47°44′23″N 109°30′23″W, el. 2,388 feet (728 m)
  - Pablo Rapids, Chouteau County, Montana, 47°45′11″N 109°53′09″W, el. 2,447 feet (746 m)
  - Picotts Rapids, Fergus County, Montana, 47°43′33″N 108°51′58″W, el. 2,270 feet (690 m)
  - Pine Island Rapids, Cascade County, Montana, 47°10′55″N 111°48′24″W, el. 3,379 feet (1,030 m)
  - The Big Eddy, Cascade County, Montana, 47°36′35″N 111°02′53″W, el. 2,776 feet (846 m)
- Big Timber Creek
  - Thunder Rapids, Sweet Grass County, Montana, 46°02′06″N 110°16′59″W, el. 8,061 feet (2,457 m)
- Yellowstone River
  - Buffalo Rapids, Custer County, Montana, 46°30′20″N 105°44′09″W, el. 2,303 feet (702 m)
  - De Russys Rapids, Prairie County, Montana, 46°51′10″N 105°02′12″W, el. 2,113 feet (644 m)
  - Dixons Rapids, Custer County, Montana, 46°33′40″N 105°37′47″W, el. 2,270 feet (690 m)
  - McKeons Rapids, Prairie County, Montana, 46°48′03″N 105°15′07″W, el. 2,159 feet (658 m)
  - Trout Rapids, Stillwater County, Montana, 45°35′04″N 109°06′38″W, el. 3,474 feet (1,059 m)
  - White Island Rapids, Prairie County, Montana, 46°51′15″N 105°08′42″W, el. 2,129 feet (649 m)
  - Wolf Rapids, Prairie County, Montana, 46°45′47″N 105°25′52″W, el. 2,195 feet (669 m)

== See also ==
- Rivers in Montana
- Waterfalls of Montana
