= List of tunnels in Montana =

There are 27 named tunnels in Montana. A tunnel is an underground passageway, completely enclosed except for openings for egress, commonly at each end. Tunnel may be for foot or vehicular road traffic, for rail traffic, or for a canal.

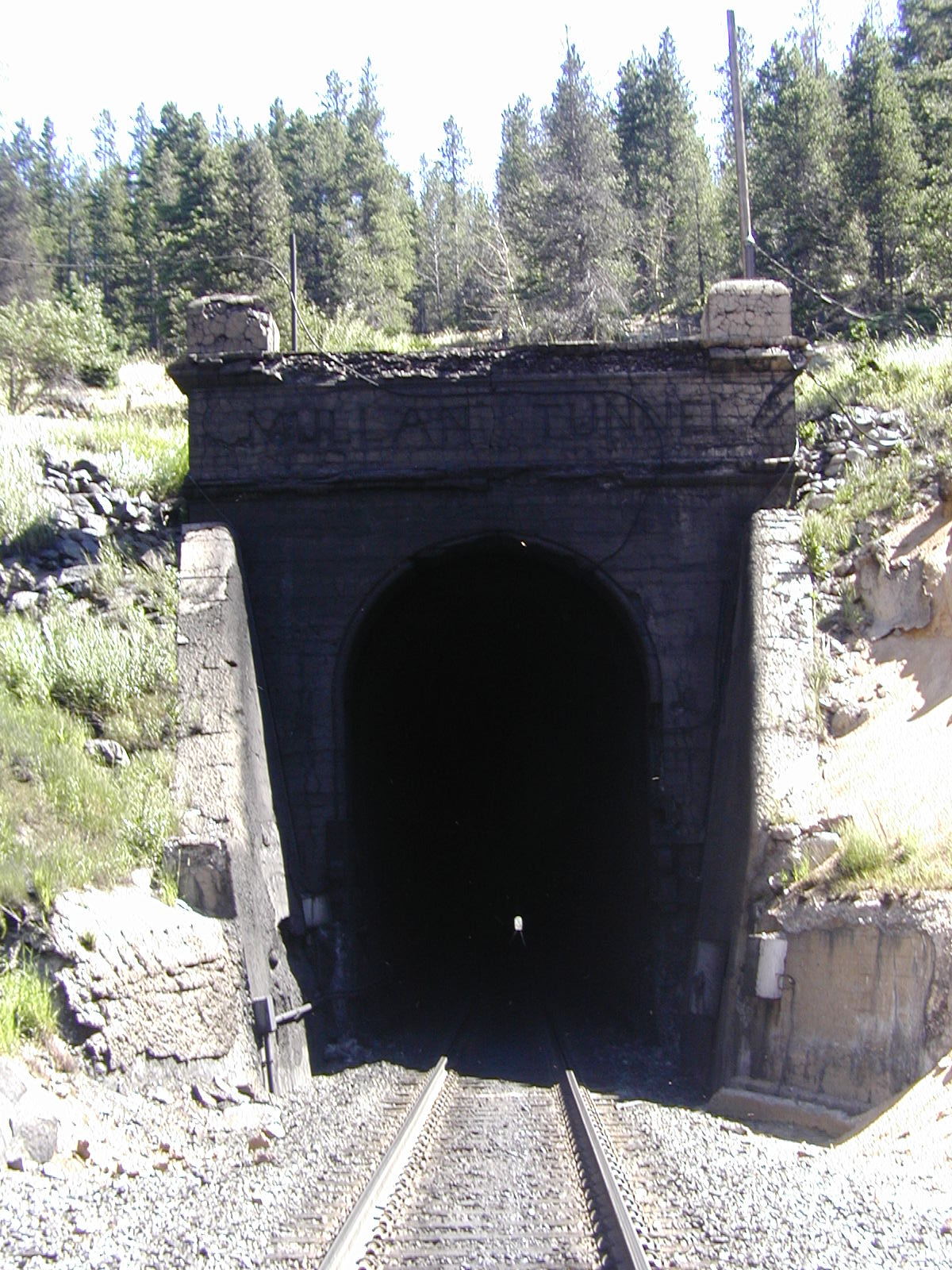
West portal of the Mullan tunnel

- (four) Chicago, Milwaukee, St. Paul and Pacific Railroad (Milwaukee Road) tunnels, abandoned rail tunnels, Great Falls Line, from east to west:
  - Lacey Tunnel Number 3, abandoned rail tunnel, c. 1913, Milwaukee Road, Chouteau County, Montana, 47°32′58″N 110°55′01″W, el. 3,386 feet (1,032 m)
  - Amphitheater Tunnel Number 4, abandoned rail tunnel, 1913, Milwaukee Road, Chouteau County, Montana, 47°33′06″N 110°55′44″W, el. 3,376 feet (1,029 m)
  - Belt Creek Tunnel Number 5, abandoned rail tunnel, 1913, Milwaukee Road, Chouteau County, Montana, 47°33′19″N 110°56′49″W, el. 3,307 feet (1,008 m)
  - Red Coulee Tunnel Number 6, abandoned rail tunnel, 1914, Milwaukee Road, Cascade County, Montana, 47°33′14″N 110°57′15″W, el. 3,287 feet (1,002 m)
- Beavertail Tunnel, rail tunnel, near I-90 interchange 130 in Missoula County, Montana, 46°43′26″N 113°34′59″W, el. 3,691 feet (1,125 m)
- Bighorn Tunnel, abandoned rail tunnel, 1882-1952, near I-94 interchange 49 in Yellowstone County, Montana, 46°08′39″N 107°31′11″W, el. 2,835 feet (864 m)
- (two) Bozeman Tunnels, rail tunnels, under I-90 at Bozeman Pass in Gallatin County, Montana, 45°39′57″N 110°48′29″W, el. 5,738 feet (1,749 m)
  - abandoned rail tunnel, 1884-c. 1945, Northern Pacific Railway
  - active rail tunnel, 1945, Montana Rail Link (formerly Northern Pacific Railway)
- Flathead Tunnel, rail tunnel, 1970, BNSF Railway (formerly Burlington Northern Railroad and Great Northern Railway) in Lincoln County northwest of Kalispell
- (two) Going-to-the-Sun Road, automobile tunnels, Glacier National Park
- Helena Valley Canal Tunnel, water tunnel, east of Helena in Lewis and Clark County, Montana, 46°38′35″N 111°45′20″W, el. 4,035 feet (1,230 m)
- John Tunnel, rail tunnel, in Sanders County, Montana northwest of Missoula, 47°20′06″N 114°47′12″W, el. 2,680 feet (820 m)
- Monitor Tunnel, abandoned rail tunnel, in Butte, Silver Bow County, Montana, 46°01′24″N 112°28′32″W, el. 6,361 feet (1,939 m)
- Mullan Tunnel, rail tunnel, c. 1883, Montana Rail Link (formerly Northern Pacific Railway), under the Continental Divide at Mullan Pass, northwest of Helena between Lewis and Clark County, Montana and Powell County, Montana, 46°38′11″N 112°18′30″W, el. 5,830 feet (1,780 m)
- (two) Nimrod Tunnels, rail tunnels, adjacent to I-90 in Granite County, Montana southeast of Missoula, 46°42′35″N 113°30′56″W, el. 3,681 feet (1,122 m)
  - abandoned rail tunnel, in use 1908-1980, Chicago, Milwaukee, St. Paul & Pacific Railroad Tunnel Number 15
  - active rail tunnel, 1882, BNSF Railway (formerly Montana Rail Link and Northern Pacific Railway)
- Painted Robe Tunnel, rail tunnel, in Golden Valley County, Montana northwest of Billings, 46°11′41″N 108°56′32″W, el. 3,763 feet (1,147 m)
- Ptarmigan Tunnel, pedestrian tunnel, 1930, in Glacier National Park, Glacier County, Montana, 48°50′57″N 113°42′28″W, el. 7,100 feet (2,200 m)
- St. Paul Pass Tunnel/Taft Tunnel, abandoned rail tunnel, in use 1908-1980, Chicago, Milwaukee, St. Paul & Pacific Railroad Tunnel Number 20, between Mineral County, Montana and Shoshone County, Idaho, now part of Milwaukee Road Rail Trail, 47°23′25″N 115°38′55″W, el. 5,141 feet (1,567 m)
- Schurchs Tunnel, Powell County, Montana, 46°17′21″N 112°33′48″W, el. 7,424 feet (2,263 m)
- Toston Canal Tunnel, water tunnel, Broadwater County, Montana, between Helena and Bozeman, 46°07′36″N 111°26′32″W, el. 4,209 feet (1,283 m)
- (two) rail tunnels, on the other side of the Missouri River from I-15, from east to west:
  - Tunnel Number 1, rail tunnel, on the other side of the Missouri River from interchange 244 on I-15 in Cascade County, Montana, 47°09′33″N 111°49′52″W, el. 3,504 feet (1,068 m)
  - Tunnel Number 3, rail tunnel, on the other side of the Missouri River from Mile Marker 237 on I-15 in Lewis and Clark County, Montana, 47°06′32″N 111°57′03″W, el. 3,592 feet (1,095 m)
- Tunnel Number 1, former rail tunnel, possibly either bypassed or daylighted, just north of interchange 324 on I-90 in Park County, Montana, 45°39′52″N 110°44′03″W, el. 5,371 feet (1,637 m)
- (two) adjacent rail tunnels along US 2 adjacent to Glacier National Park in Flathead County, Montana, from south to north:
  - Tunnel Number 2, rail tunnel, 48°22′06″N 113°40′31″W, el. 3,734 feet (1,138 m)
  - Tunnel Number 3, rail tunnel, 48°22′23″N 113°40′55″W, el. 3,783 feet (1,153 m)
- Two Leggins Canal Tunnel, water tunnel, in Big Horn County, Montana north of Hardin, 45°58′22″N 107°32′13″W, el. 2,789 feet (850 m)
- Vista Tunnel, former rail tunnel, either bypassed or daylighted, northwest of Whitefish in Flathead County, Montana, 48°28′17″N 114°26′33″W, el. 3,179 feet (969 m)
- Wayne Tunnel, rail tunnel, 1911, BNSF Railway (formerly Great Northern Railway), southeast of Great Falls in Cascade County, Montana, 47°26′21″N 110°56′35″W, el. 3,779 feet (1,152 m)
- Wickes Tunnel/Boulder Tunnel, abandoned rail tunnel, Great Northern Railway, north of Boulder in Jefferson County, Montana, 46°19′48″N 112°06′48″W, el. 6,224 feet (1,897 m)

== See also ==
- Railroads in Montana
- List of tunnels in the United States
