= Montana (state song) =

State song of Montana, United States

- Regional anthem of Montana
- Lyrics: Charles Cohan
- Music: Joseph E. Howard
- Adopted: February 20, 1945

Audio sample
- Montana: file; help

"Montana" is the regional anthem of the U.S. state of Montana. It was written by Charles Cohan and composed by Joseph E. Howard and was adopted as the state song on February 20, 1945.

== Lyrics ==
Tell me of that Treasure State,
Story always new,
Tell of its beauties grand
And its hearts so true.
Mountains of sunset fire
The land I love the best
Let me grasp the hand of one
From out the golden West

Montana, Montana, Glory of the West
Of all the states from coast to coast, You're easily the best
Montana, Montana, Where skies are always blue
M-O-N-T-A-N-A
Montana I love you!

Each country has its flower;
Each one plays a part,
Each bloom brings a longing hope
To some lonely heart.
Bitterroot to me is dear
Growing in my land
Sing then that glorious air
The one I understand.

Montana, Montana, Glory of the West
Of all the states from coast to coast, You're easily the best
Montana, Montana, Where skies are always blue
M-O-N-T-A-N-A
Montana I love you!
