= Seal of Montana =

Official government emblem of the U.S. state of Montana

Great Seal of the State of Montana

Versions
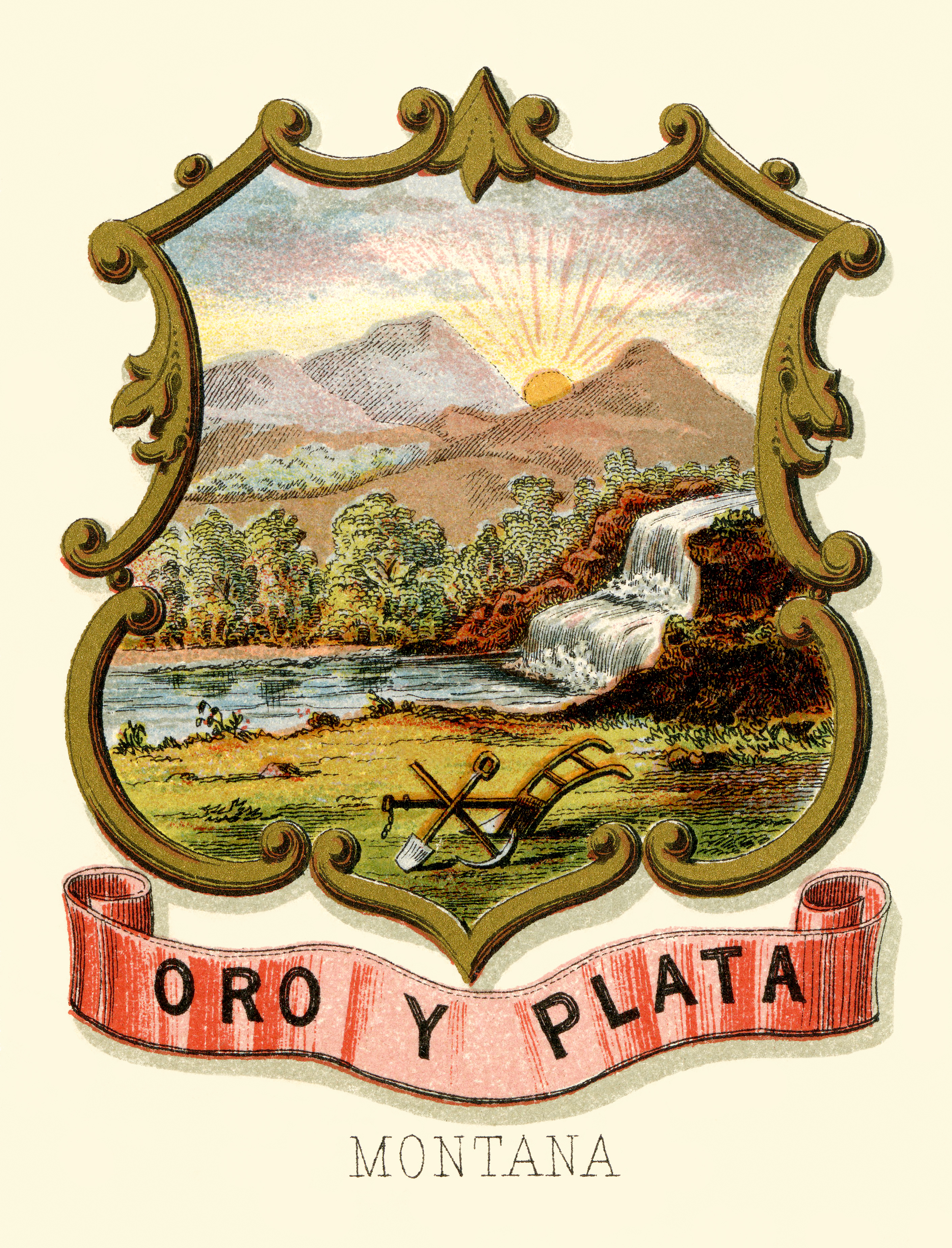
- Territorial and state historical coat of arms (1876)
- Armiger: State of Montana
- Adopted: 1865
- Motto: Oro y plata

The Great Seal of the State of Montana was adopted in 1865, when Montana was a United States Territory.

== History ==
When Montana became a state in 1889, it kept the same seal. In 1891, proposals were made to change or switch to a new seal, but these proposals did not pass the Legislature.

== Description ==
The outer ring contains the text "The Great Seal of the State of Montana". The inner circle depicts a landscape of mountains, plains and forests by Great Falls on the Missouri River. A plow, a pick and a shovel are depicted on the front, representing the state's agricultural and mining industries. The banner at the bottom presents the territorial motto of Oro y Plata, (Gold and Silver).
