= 2025 in Montana =

- Decades: 2000s; 2010s; 2020s
- See also: History of Montana; Historical outline of Montana; List of years in Montana; 2025 in the United States

The following is a list of events of the year 2025 in Montana.

== Incumbents ==
=== State government ===
- Governor: Greg Gianforte (R)

== Events ==
- January 1 – Local AM radio stations KLCB and KTNY cease operations.
- January 5 – 6: Montana is affected by the January 5–6, 2025 United States blizzard.
- April 17 – 2025 Southwest United States measles outbreak: The Montana Department of Public Health and Human Services confirms the first case of measles in the state since the 1990s.
- June 9 – The Montana Supreme Court upholds a lower court ruling that decided abortion restrictions from a 2021 state law were unconstitutional.
- August 1 – Four people are fatally shot at a bar in Anaconda. The suspect flees and is arrested on August 8.
- August 13 – A federal district court settlement dictates that the Montana Office of Public Instruction must provide education up to age 22 for students with individualized education programs.
- October 22 – Four people are killed in a helicopter crash near Ekalaka. The four victims are identified as relatives of former Illinois State Senator and gubernatorial candidate Darren Bailey.
- November 4 - Local elections are held across the state. The seven largest cities vote on city leadership, including mayors in Billings, Bozeman, Great Falls, Helena, Kalispell, and Missoula, and Chief Executive of Butte-Silver Bow County.
- December 31 – The Montana Supreme Court dismisses a misconduct case against State Attorney General Austin Knudsen.

== See also ==
- 2025 in the United States
