= 2026 in Montana =

- Decades: 2000s; 2010s; 2020s
- See also: History of Montana; Historical outline of Montana; List of years in Montana; 2026 in the United States

The following is a list of events of the year 2026 in Montana.

== Incumbents ==
=== State government ===
- Governor: Greg Gianforte (R)

== Events ==
=== January ===
- January 5 – The Montana State Bobcats beat the Illinois State Redbirds 35–34 in overtime to win the NCAA Division I FCS football championship.
- January 26 – Friend of musician D4vd and Twitch streamer Neo Langston is arrested in Helena for failing to appear as witness for D4vd's court case.
- January 29 – Great Falls and surrounding communities experience a 4.2 magnitude earthquake that later causes smaller aftershocks, including one of 3.7 magnitude.

=== February ===
- February 11 – The Montana Attorney General says the city of Helena will be investigated for violations of the state's ban on sanctuary cities. Helena had passed a resolution stating that city officials would not disclose immigration status or national origin to outside agencies. In March, the city council votes to repeal the resolution.

=== March ===
- March 4 – At the United States Capitol, Senator Tim Sheehey gets involved in an altercation with former Marine Brian McGinnis who was protesting the war with Iran.
- March 11
  - Montana Grizzlies men's basketball team loses to the Idaho Vandals men's basketball team in the Big Sky Championship.
  - The Montana State Bobcats lose to the Idaho Vandals in the Big Sky Championship, and the Bobcats receive an automatic bid to the WNIT.
- March 29 – The Montana State Bobcats women's basketball team loses to the South Dakota Coyotes in the Great 8 round of the WNIT.

=== April ===
- April 11 – Tim Sheehey makes an emergency landing near the town of Ennis during a routine training exercise.
- April 15 – The Montana Supreme Court rules that the Montana Department of Public Health and Human Services and Montana Department of Justice cannot block transgender residents from updating their legal documents to match their gender identity.
- April 22 – A Fairfield school and several businesses implement emergency water use restrictions, including portable restrooms and paper tableware at the school. The town temporarily lost multiple wells due to an ongoing drought and leaking water in the sewer and water systems.

=== May ===
- May 7 – A hiker's body is found in Glacier National Park after a suspected bear attack, being the first killing in 28 years.
- May 8 – Bureau of Land Management revokes American Prairie's bison grazing permit for land near Phillips County.
- May 13 – A small landspout tornado near Big Sandy forms as a result of a combination of a wind and severe thunderstorm.
- May 14 – A lawsuit is filed over the illegality of corner crossing in Montana.

=== June ===
- June 25 – Native American groups celebrate the 150th anniversary of the Battle of Little Bighorn at the site of the battle near Crow Agency.
- June 27 – A large low pressure system brings rain and snow to Montana, causing flooding in several parts of the state, including Glacier National Park.

=== July ===
- July 21 – A Helena jury finds former state senator Jason Ellsworth guilty of misconduct. However, the verdict is thrown out the next day due to jurors accidentally being exposed to sealed exhibits.
- July 23 – A major heat wave impacts the state along with unhealthy air conditions from smoke caused by wildfires.

=== August ===
- August 20 – A federal judge orders a release for a Billings man and his daughter to be released from the Havre U.S. Customs and Border Protections station after deeming the arrest to be unconstitutional.
- August 23 – Eight people are killed in a domestic shooting and house fire in Billings. The gunman kills himself. The victims are identified as the gunman's parents, grandmother, sister, and four nieces and nephews.

=== September ===
- September 14 – A man is attacked by a grizzly bear archery hunting outside of Augusta on land near Elk Creek and Haystack Butte. He drives himself to Benefis Health System where he is treated for non-life threatening injuries.
- September 18 – A 3.6 magnitude earthquake occurs in Great Falls and surrounding communities, being the second in less than a year.

=== October ===
- October 3- The unranked 0–4 (at the time) Idaho Vandals upset number one ranked (at the time) Montana State Bobcats 35-34 in Moscow, Idaho.
- October 8
  - California state government ends the "Montana Loophole", which allowed limited liability companies to avoid car registration and sales fees if they bought their vehicle in Montana and more than half of their company is based in the state.
  - A bull moose gets stuck in Red Lodge's skatepark and is tranquilized in order to be rescued by Montana Department of Fish, Wildlife, and Parks.
- October 10–11 – A snowstorm moves through the majority of the state, affecting mainly the western portion with snow in both the mountains and lower elevations.
- October 14 – President Trump visits Kalispell's Majestic Valley Arena to support Montana's Republican candidates and speak on other key points like a "super range" for testing ballistic missiles in the state.
- October 26 – Vice president JD Vance visits Yellowstone International Airport in Belgrade for a rally supporting Montana's republican candidates.
- October 27 – The University of Providence in Great Falls announces it will close at the end of the 2026–27 school year.

=== November ===
- November 3 – 2026 Montana elections:
  - 2026 Montana House of Representatives election
  - 2026 Montana Senate election
  - 2026 United States House of Representatives elections in Montana
  - 2026 United States Senate election in Montana: Former U.S. Attorney Kurt Alme wins the election, beating former University of Montana president Seth Bodnar and Air Force officer Alani Bankhead.

=== Scheduled ===
- November 21 – Brawl of the Wild

=== Sports ===
- 2025–26 Montana Grizzlies basketball team
- 2025–26 Montana State Bobcats men's basketball team
- 2026 Montana State Bobcats football team
- 2026 Montana Grizzlies football team
- 2026-27 Montana Grizzlies men's basketball team
- 2026-27 Montana Grizzlies women's basketball team
- 2026-27 Montana State Bobcats men's basketball team
- 2026-27 Montana State Bobcats women's basketball team

== See also ==
- 2026 in the United States
