= 2023 in Montana =

- Decades: 2000s; 2010s; 2020s
- See also: History of Montana; Historical outline of Montana; List of years in Montana; 2023 in the United States

The following is a list of events of the year 2023 in Montana.

== Incumbents ==
=== State government ===
- Governor: Greg Gianforte (R)

== Events ==
- February 2 – 2023 Chinese balloon incident: The United States Department of Defense monitors a high-altitude balloon from China flying over Montana. The Chinese Foreign Affairs Ministry says the balloon is used for civilian meteorological research and had drifted off-course due to unexpected weather.
- April 26 – Zooey Zephyr, the first openly transgender member of the Montana House of Representatives, is censured by the Republican-led chamber on a party-line vote following her protest of anti-transgender legislation. Zephyr will be barred from debate until the May legislative session.
- May 17 – Montana Governor Greg Gianforte signs a bill banning TikTok, making Montana the first U.S. state to ban the Chinese-owned social media app.
- June 24 – 2023 Yellowstone River train derailment: A bridge crossing the Yellowstone River in Stillwater County collapses, causing a freight train carrying hot asphalt and molten sulfur to derail.
- July 22 – A deck collapse at a country club in Billings injures more than 30 people.

== See also ==
- 2023 in the United States
