= Joseph Morrison =

Joseph Morrison may refer to:

- Joseph Curran Morrison (1816–1885), lawyer, judge and political figure in Canada West
- Joseph G. Morrison (1871–1947), minister and general superintendent in the Church of the Nazarene
- Joseph Wanton Morrison (1783–1826), British soldier in the War of 1812
- Joe Morrison (1937–1989), NFL football player
- Joe Morrison (TV presenter), football presenter
- Joe Morrison (field hockey) (born 2001), field hockey player from New Zealand
- Joey Morrison, American politician, mayor of Bozeman, Montana (2026-present)

== See also ==
- Joseph Morrison Skelly, history professor
