= 2024 in Montana =

- Decades: 2000s; 2010s; 2020s
- See also: History of Montana; Historical outline of Montana; List of years in Montana; 2024 in the United States

The following is a list of events of the year 2024 in Montana.

== Incumbents ==
=== State government ===
- Governor: Greg Gianforte (R)

== Events ==
Ongoing: 2024 Montana wildfires

- January 1 – The Montana Rail Link becomes a subdivision of BNSF, and all employees of MRL were offered employment with BNSF.
- June 4 –
  - 2024 Montana Republican presidential primary
  - 2024 Montana Democratic presidential primary
- July 10 – A plane fighting the Horse Gulch fire crashes into Hauser Lake, killing the pilot onboard.

== Deaths ==
=== May ===
- 24 May Minerva Allen (age 90), Assiniboine poet and educator

== See also ==
- 2024 in the United States
