= 2026 Billings shooting =

Mass shooting in Montana, US

- Location: 45.763652°N 108.651376°W; 315 White Star Circle near Billings, Montana, US
- Date: August 23, 2026; 6:01 p.m. – 6:12 p.m. (MDT; UTC−06:00)
- Target: Family members
- Attack type: Mass shooting; familicide; arson; murder-suicide; shootout; child murder
- Deaths: 9 (including the perpetrator)
- Perpetrator: Alan Michael Smith
- Motive: Domestic dispute

On August 23, 2026, a mass shooting occurred at a residence near Billings, Montana, United States. The gunman, identified as 44-year-old Alan Michael Smith, opened fire on his family as they gathered for Sunday dinner at their home. The shooting and subsequent arson which destroyed the entire house killed nine people including the perpetrator. It is the deadliest mass shooting in Montana’s history.

According to a database maintained by Associated Press and USA Today, the shooting was the 22nd mass killing in 2026 in the United States.

== Shooting ==
Alan arrived at the family's home at 5:49 p.m., during a family dinner. Around 11 minutes later, at 6:01 p.m, the Billings Police Department responded to a 911 call made by 12-year-old Charlotte Ghekiere about a family disturbance. At 6:12 p.m., when police arrived at the home, the house was on fire, and they spotted Alan was in the front yard. Alan retreated back inside, and officers heard more gunfire before he ran to the backyard, where he was found with a self-inflicted gunshot wound. He was taken into custody, and was taken to a local hospital where he was pronounced dead.

Firefighters fought against the arson attacks until 1 a.m. the next day.

== Victims ==
Eight members of the family were killed, representing four generations, with ages ranging from seven years old to 92 years old. The deceased were identified amid the ruins. The victims were Dana Smith, aged 73, and Barbara Smith, 72, who owned the home and were the parents of Alan. Their daughter, Megan Ireland-Ghekiere, 39, was killed along with her four children: Owen Ireland, 13; Chloe Ireland, 7; Landon Ghekiere, 15; and Charlotte Ghekiere, 12. Evelyn Smith, 92, the grandmother of Megan and Alan, did not live at the home but was visiting for a Sunday dinner, and was also killed.

Charlotte Ghekiere, who called 911 from inside the residence during the shooting, was posthumously honored by the Youth Peace & Justice Foundation for her heroism.

== Perpetrator ==
The perpetrator was identified as 44-year-old Alan Michael Smith. Smith attended Eastern Washington University but was unable to find a job or hold one. Smith moved into his parents' home and lived with them for years before being asked to move out a couple of weeks prior to the shootings.

Brad Ireland, the ex-husband of Megan, described Smith as a hermit.

== See also ==
- 2025 Anaconda shooting, a mass shooting in Montana which happened just over a year prior
- Karolkiewicz family murders, another familicide that happened earlier in the year
- Shreveport shooting, another familicide that happened earlier in the year
- Covina massacre, a similar attack during a dinner party
