= Paris Gibson =

American politician and businessman (1830–1920)

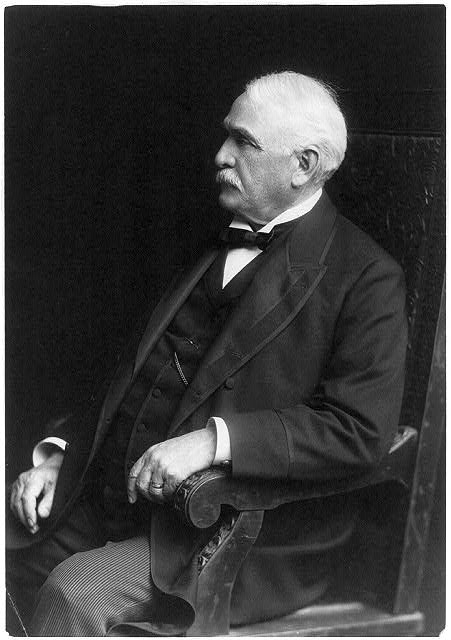

United States Senator from Montana
- In office March 7, 1901 – March 3, 1905
- Preceded by: William A. Clark
- Succeeded by: Thomas Henry Carter

Personal details
- Born: July 1, 1830 Brownfield, Maine, US
- Died: December 16, 1920 (aged 90) Great Falls, Montana, US
- Resting place: Highland Cemetery, Great Falls, Montana
- Party: Democratic
- Education: Bowdoin College
- Occupation: Entrepreneur, politician

Paris Gibson (July 1, 1830 – December 16, 1920) was an American entrepreneur and politician.

Gibson was born in Brownfield, Maine. An 1851 graduate of Bowdoin College, he served as a member of the Montana State Senate and as a Democratic member of the United States Senate between 1901 and 1905.

== Career ==
In 1853 he was elected to the Maine legislature. After moving to Minnesota, where he built the North Star Woolen Mill at Saint Anthony Falls, he served on the University of Minnesota Board of Regents from 1871 through 1879, and was a founding trustee of Lakewood Cemetery. He abandoned his failed business interests in Minnesota to try his luck out West and, in 1880, paid a visit to the Great Falls of the Missouri River and quickly recognized their potential for producing hydroelectric power.

Gibson convinced his friend, railroad magnate James J. Hill, to invest in a townsite at the falls and urged that Hill extend his railroad through the new city. In 1883, the city of Great Falls, Montana, was founded with Gibson as mayor.

By 1887, Hill rail lines linked Great Falls to Butte, Montana, and Helena, Montana. However, the main line of Hill's Great Northern Railway bypassed Great Falls to the north. Despite this setback, Great Falls became a major center of trade for area farmers and ranchers, and its dams on the Missouri River contributed power for ore processing and grain milling industries.

When William A. Clark resigned from the United States Senate, Gibson, a Democrat, was elected to fill the seat, and he served from March 7, 1901, until March 3, 1905. He did not seek re-election. He died in Great Falls and is buried there in Highland Cemetery.

== Personal life ==
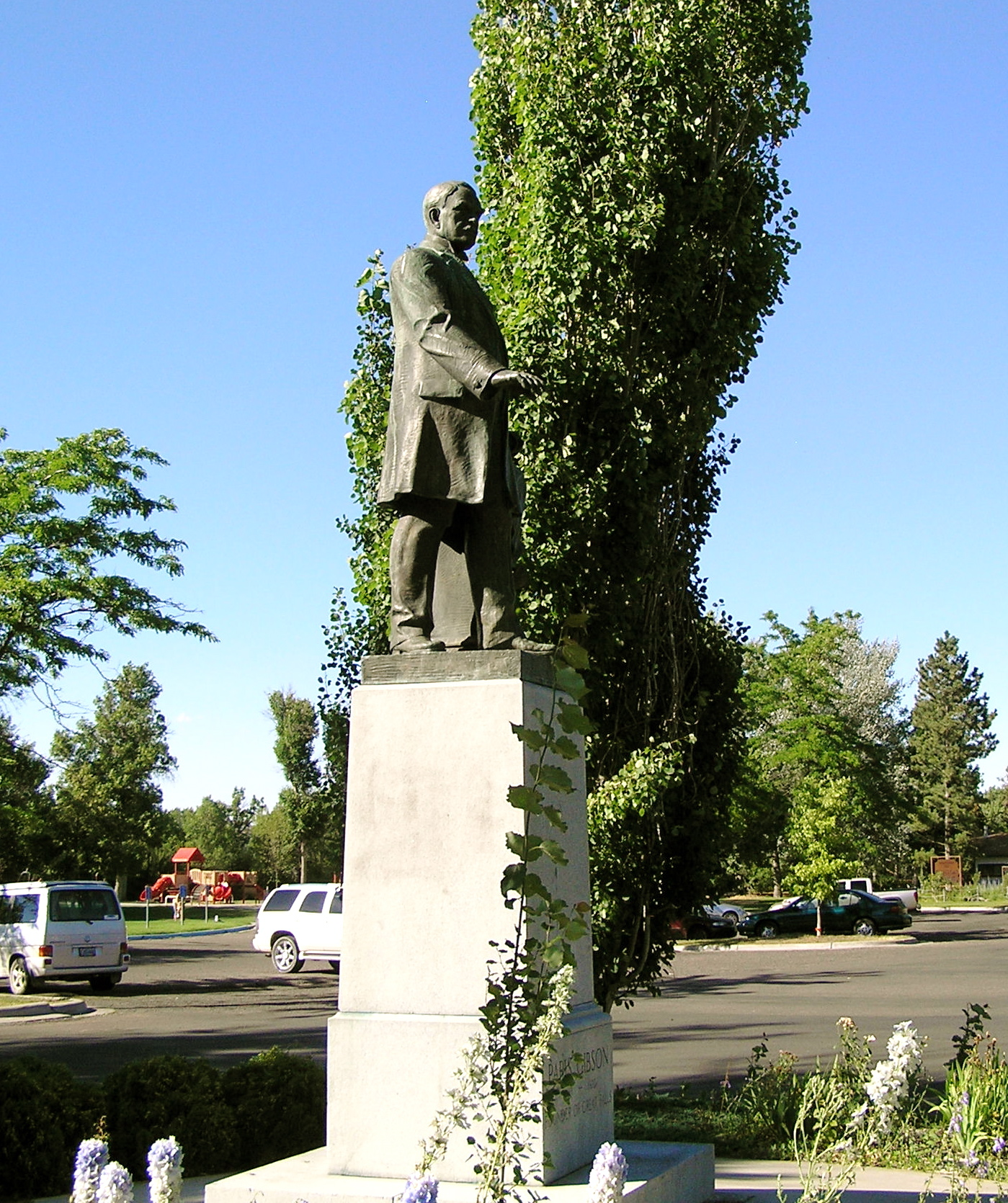
Statue honoring Paris Gibson at Gibson Park, Great Falls, Montana

Paris was married to Valeria Goodenow Sweat. They had four children; two died at an early age, at 1 and 2 years old. They had two sons who lived to adulthood.

In 1912, Philip was sent to Warm Springs, a state mental hospital in Warm Springs, Montana, for "exhaustion of paresis", sometimes known as "general paralysis of the insane," where he died. Some time later, Theodore suffered a similar health problem and was also sent to Warm Springs, where he died.

== Gibson House haunting ==
Kelly Parks purchased the Theo Gibson home in Great Falls in 2010. She asserts the house, which was built in 1890, is haunted by Valeria Gibson's ghost.

== See also ==
- List of mayors of Great Falls, Montana

U.S. Senate
Preceded by William A. Clark	U.S. senator (Class 1) from Montana; 1901–1905; Served alongside: William A. Clark	Succeeded by Thomas H. Carter
