= 2025 Anaconda shooting =

Mass shooting in Montana, U.S.

- Location: 46.1263°N 112.9422°W; The Owl Bar; 819 E 3rd St; Anaconda, Montana, U.S.
- Date: August 1, 2025; 10:30 a.m. (MDT; UTC−06:00)
- Attack type: Arson; mass shooting; mass murder
- Weapon: 7.62×39mm SKS semi-automatic rifle
- Deaths: 4
- Motive: Subject experiencing psychosis
- Accused: Michael Paul Brown
- Charges: Deliberate homicide (x4); Attempted arson Theft; Evading law enforcement

On August 1, 2025, a mass shooting occurred at The Owl Bar in Anaconda, Montana, United States. According to investigators, the suspect is a 45-year-old man who lived next door to the bar. Charging documents allege that after lighting a pizza box on fire in the back of the bar and putting it on top of a bucket filled with flammable liquids he shot and killed the bartender and three patrons before fleeing the scene. He was captured seven days later by a multi-agency fugitive task force, and later charged with four counts of murder, one count of arson, one count of theft, and one count of eluding police.

== Shooting and manhunt ==
The shooting occurred around 10:30 a.m. at The Owl Bar in Anaconda. Prior to the shooting, the suspect allegedly filled a bucket with a liquid believed to be lighter fluid before lighting a pizza box on fire and placing it on top of the bucket in the back of the bar before exiting through the back entrance and retrieving a rifle from his home. The bartender, Nancy Kelley, attempted to put out the fire that the suspect started when the suspect entered the bar from the front entrance and shot Kelley, causing her to fall onto the fire and catch on fire. After shooting Kelley, the suspect shot the three patrons who were inside the bar at the time. The suspect allegedly first shot Tony Palm, then Daniel Baillie and David Leach. A responding officer used a fire extinguisher to extinguish Kelley. After allegedly shooting the victims, the suspect then fled the scene in his underwear and stole a white Ford F-150; investigators believe he later put on clothes. Police found the truck on Stumptown Road west of Anaconda.

Two days after the shooting, a man was arrested in Morton County, North Dakota, after a caller misidentified him as the shooter after he was seen hitchhiking south of Mandan near the North Dakota Veterans Cemetery. The man was identified as a North Dakota resident with no connection to the shooting, but he was charged with possession and intent to deliver and unlawful possession of drug paraphernalia after he was allegedly found to have four bags of methamphetamine in his possession, which he reportedly told authorities he planned to deliver to Sioux County.

The suspect was captured on August 8 on a property adjacent to Montana Highway 1 west of Anaconda by members of the United States Marshals Service Fugitive Task Force, which consisted of law enforcement officers from the United States Forest Service, the Montana Highway Patrol, Laurel Police Department, Great Falls Police Department, and Montana Probation and Parole. Authorities had announced a $10,000 reward for information on his whereabouts. Multiple local, state, and federal agencies assisted in the search. The owner of the property that the suspect was captured on said that the suspect said that he expressed regret by saying he "made a mistake back there".

== Victims ==
The four victims were identified as 64-year-old Nancy Lauretta Kelley, 59-year-old Daniel Edwin Baillie, 70-year-old David Allen Leach, and 74-year-old Tony Wayne Palm. Kelley was a bartender and the other three were patrons. The Owl Bar's owner said he believed the suspect knew all four of the victims. He also said the four victims were likely the only people in the bar at the time of the shooting.

== Suspect ==
The charged defendant was identified as 45-year-old longtime Anaconda resident Michael Paul Brown (born October 31, 1979) who lived next door to the bar. Brown had previously served in the United States Army as an armor crewman from 2001 to 2005, was deployed in Iraq from early 2004 to March 2005, and was part of the Montana National Guard from 2006 to 2009 before he left military service with the rank of sergeant.

The owner of The Owl Bar said that he believed Brown didn't have running water or power in his house prior to the attack, and that Brown would frequent the bar, but that he never became intoxicated. The owner said that in addition to coming to his bar, Brown would also frequent another bar in Anaconda, Carmel's Sports Bar & Grill. Friends and family of Brown said that Brown suffered from delusions, at times believing he was the movie character John Wick, a wizard, or that he once was in a relationship with Sandra Bullock. Brown's niece alleged that an intoxicated patron of The Owl Bar once attempted to urinate on Brown's front porch before she intervened, but the owner of the bar denied it and said that Brown had never had any apparent issues with the other patrons at the bar.

Brown allegedly confessed to the shooting, and told investigators that he believed he was the owner of The Owl Bar and was being brainwashed by the bar's jukebox. Brown also allegedly said that he liked the victims and hoped to destroy the jukebox in the attack.

== Investigation ==
Investigators used surveillance footage to identify the suspect in the shooting. Surveillance footage showed that before the suspect opened fire, there were four people inside the bar; the bartender and three male patrons. The bartender was standing behind the bar, two patrons were sat at the south end of the bar, and one patron was standing at the north end of the bar. Four spent shell casings, two fired bullets, a rifle cleaning rod, a five-gallon bucket, apparent lighter fluid, matches, spray paint cans, and propane tank canisters which are typically used in camping were located by officers inside the bar. A SKS 7.62x39mm was located in the suspect's home and an analysis of a bullet recovered from a victim's abdomen matched the rifle.

== Legal proceedings ==
On August 11, 2025, Brown made his first court appearance in a county court in Anaconda where the judge set a $2 million bond on the condition that the defendant would waive his right to confidentiality, not change his address, not engage in any criminal activities, avoid any contact with the alleged victim's families, and not enter any bars or taverns. On September 3, a district judge granted the prosecution's request to hold Brown without bail in the interest of public safety after defense attorneys raised concerns about his mental health. On that date, Brown was also charged with four counts of deliberate homicide, one count of arson, one count of theft, and one count of evading law enforcement. Brown entered a plea of not guilty and a trial was scheduled for January 12, 2026. A prosecuting attorney told the court a decision on whether to pursue the death penalty remained pending.

On October 1, in an omnibus hearing memorandum filled out by both state and defense attorneys, questions were raised about Brown having a "mental disease or defect" which would inhibit his ability to defend himself during his sentencing. Brown's defense attorneys also requested a change of venue. On December 16, Brown was found unfit to stand trial and the planned January 2026 trial was suspended. Brown was scheduled to be placed in a mental health facility and put into the custody of the director of the Montana Department of Health and Human Services for 90 days to undergo examination by a psychiatrist or clinical psychologist. A status hearing was scheduled for March 2026. Brown was admitted to the Montana State Hospital on January 12, 2026, where Anaconda-Deer Lodge county attorney Morgan Smith said the hospital had "developed an individualized treatment plan, as is required by statute, to assist in regaining fitness" for trial. Smith also that the state was considering filing a motion to pursue involuntary medication for Brown so that he may be fit to stand trial. On March 16, during the scheduled status hearing, Smith said that she and Brown's defense attorney had reached an agreement to have another status hearing on May 13.

== Aftermath ==
In the months after the shooting, local officials grappled with covering the costs of the manhunt and were exploring the possibility of laying off four police officers for nine months or increasing taxes by over 20 millage. However, Montana governor Greg Gianforte reached out to Anaconda-Deer Lodge County Chief Executive Bill Everett by phone and offered state funds to cover $450,000 in costs sustained by local law enforcement during the manhunt. In a city-county meeting in November 2025, it was decided to levy two millage onto taxpayers to help cover the costs of the manhunt.

In January 2026, a coalition of media organizations submitted a motion to access court records related to the killings, arguing that an order by the district judge, Jeffrey Dahood, to seal all legal documents in the court case following a request by Anaconda-Deer Lodge county attorney Morgan Smith was in violation of state law and "fails to balance the public and Press's constitutional right to examine public documents". Dahood denied the motion, writing that the press had not "established why the court should allow them into this pending criminal case". An editor of the Daily Montanan wrote in response to Dahood's decision that sealing entire criminal cases would set a "dangerous precedent" and that it was the "public's right to observe that helps ensure that justice is carried out without the appearance of something clandestine or prejudicial". On March 24, the Montana Supreme Court ordered the district court to hear the news organization's request to unseal the document. In its decision, the Montana Supreme Court wrote that Dahood misunderstood the state's laws regarding public access to court records. In April, the Montana Supreme Court ruled unanimously in favor of the media coalition, and nearly all charging documents, excluding those related to the suspect's mental health evaluation, were scheduled to be unsealed on May 8.

== Reactions ==
Montana governor Greg Gianforte said that "devastation struck this small Montana community of Anaconda" in response to the shooting. During the manhunt, Gianforte signed an executive order which would allow the state to share the costs of the manhunt and opened up additional funds to be funneled into the search operations. Montana senator Steve Daines thanked law enforcement for their effort in apprehending the suspect and said that "Anaconda and the surrounding community showed the country the resilience and grit that makes MT special". Anaconda-Deer Lodge County Chief Executive Bill Everett expressed gratitude for the statewide multi-agency response to the shooting. Everett described the response as "phenomenal" and said that law enforcement officers were "going full bore".

The Owl Bar was reopened on August 23, 2025, and the owner thanked the community and state for their response to the shooting. A memorial benefit for the bar, the shooting victims, and funds for a memorial for the victims, was held on September 27 at the bar. In December 2025, the owner of The Owl Bar reacted negatively to the delays in the suspect's judicial hearings. The owner said that he wanted law enforcement to "to carry him out" rather than arrest him because he feared that questions about the mental health of the suspect would delay proceedings.

== See also ==
- Crime in Montana
- 2003 Ennis shooting, another mass shooting in Montana
- List of mass shootings in the United States in 2025
