= Early Indian treaty territories in Montana =

A number of different Native Americans living in present-day Montana entered into treaties with the United States during the 19th Century. Most of the treaties included an article that established the territory of the tribe (or tribes) entering into it. More and more of this Indian land turned into public or U.S. territory with the signing of new treaties. (See the maps).

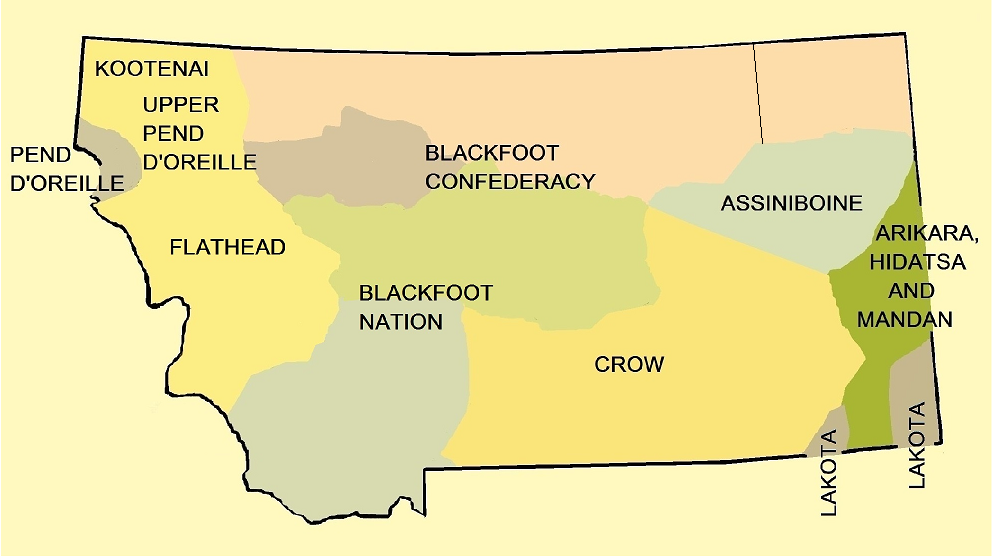
General view of early Indian treaty territories in Montana

== Area 300 ==
Assiniboine Indian territory as described in the Treaty of Fort Laramie (1851). The area changed into U.S. domain on April 13, 1875. In 1866, the Assiniboine had actually ceded the area by a treaty, which was never ratified.

== Areas 373 and 374 ==
"Flathead, Kootenay and Upper Pond d'Oreille" used this range. The Kootenai and Upper Pend d'Oreille (Kalispel) lived north of Flathead Lake. The Flathead (Salish) made camps in the valley south of it. Area 374 is the "Jocko Reserve" established by the Hellgate treaty in 1855.

== Areas 398, 399, 565 and 574 ==
The Blackfeet Indians and their Indian allies in the Gros Ventre tribe hunted and pitched tipis here. Areas 398 (extending into Wyoming) and 399 is the Fort Laramie treaty (1851) territory of the Blackfoot Nation. It is something of an oddity, since the Blackfeet did not attend the treaty councils. On October 17, 1855, area 398 became shared hunting grounds for "ninety-nine" years and the Blackfeet accepted camps of the Flathead, Upper Pend d'Oreille, Kootenay and Nez Perce, as well as whites, on the ranges. Further, they allowed the Assiniboine to hunt on a part of their easternmost treaty range (area 565) bordering present-day North Dakota (indicated with a black line). The green area 399 is not included in the 1855 treaty territory of the Blackfeet, but it was first formally relinquished on July 5, 1873, by executive order. Area 574 was ceded by executive orders of April 15 and August 18, 1874. The reserve thus left to the Blackfeet in 1874 (area 565 without the common hunting ground bordering North Dakota) would diminish later. Today, both the Blackfeet Reservation, the Rocky Boy Indian Reservation, the Fort Belknap Indian Reservation and the Fort Peck Indian Reservation is located within this former Blackfeet treaty land between the Missouri and Canada.

== Areas 517, 619 and 635 ==
The three areas together indicate the Crow Indian territory in Montana as defined in the Treaty of Fort Laramie (1851). Areas 619 and 635 show the smaller Crow Indian Reservation established on May 7, 1868.

== Area 532 ==
This is a vacuum in the cessions of Indian land. With adjoining tribal areas outside Montana, the territory was claimed by "Methow, Okanagan, Kooteny, Pend d'Oreille, Colville, North Spokane, San Poeil, and other tribes". When tribal reservations were established in other states in 1872, the United States "simply took possession" of area 532 on "December 0, 1871".

== Areas 529 and 620 ==
The combined areas show the westernmost land recognized as Arikara, Hidatsa and Mandan territory in the Treaty of Fort Laramie (1851). The United States came into possession of area 529 by executive order of April 12, 1870, and area 620 by executive order of July 13, 1880.

== Area 597 ==
The two gray areas at the right bottom of the map indicate the northwestern edges of a larger Lakota territory in the present-day Dakotas and Wyoming as described in the Treaty of Fort Laramie (1851).

== The Northern Cheyennes ==
The Northern Cheyennes are not mentioned here, since the treaties defining Indian territories in Montana antedate the arrival of them. They (along with the Northern Arapahos and the Lakotas) advanced into Montana during the Sioux Wars in the mid-1860s and the 1870s. The western part of the present Northern Cheyenne Indian Reservation is end-to-end with the eastern and longer border of the Crow reservation in the central part of the 1851 Crow treaty territory (yellow area 517).

== The Chippewas and the Crees ==
The Chippewas and the Crees are other groups of Native Americans without a long history in Montana. The Rocky Boy Indian Reservation is located in the center of area 565.

== The map ==
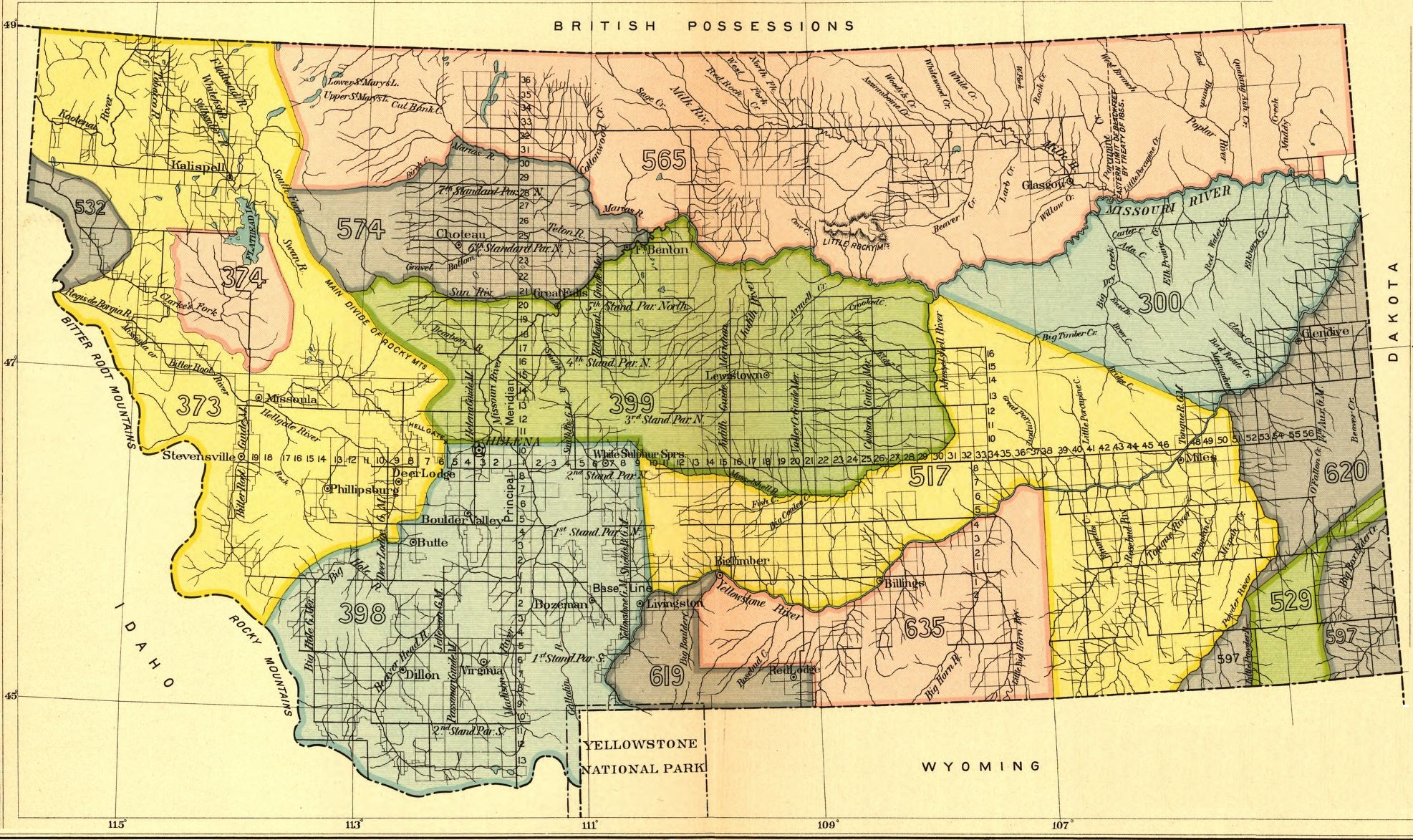
Map with Indian territories in Montana
