= Murder in Montana law =

Murder in Montana law constitutes the intentional killing, under circumstances defined by law, of people within or under the jurisdiction of the U.S. state of Montana.

The United States Centers for Disease Control and Prevention reported that in the year 2020, the state had a murder rate slightly below the median for the entire country.

== Penalties ==
Offense	Mandatory sentencing
Aiding or soliciting suicide	Up to 10 years in prison
Negligent homicide	Up to 20 years in prison
Vehicular homicide while under influence	Up to 30 years
Mitigated deliberate homicide	2 to 40 years in prison
Deliberate homicide	Death (de jure) (Note: Capital punishment has been indefinitely suspended by court order in Montana since 2015.) or; Life imprisonment without the possibility of parole or; Life-with-parole after at least 30 years or; 10 to 100 years in prison

Under Montana law, prosecutors can charge minors as young as 12 years old as adults for certain crimes, including deliberate homicide (whether mitigated or not), or attempted deliberate or mitigated homicide.

Under Montana law, deliberate homicide is punishable by death when committed:

1. By an offender while in official detention;
2. By an offender who had been previously convicted of another deliberate homicide;
3. By means of torture;
4. By lying in wait or ambush;
5. As a part of a scheme or operation that, if completed, would result in the death of more than one person;
6. During the course of committing sexual assault, sexual intercourse without consent, deviate sexual conduct, or incest, and the victim was less than 18 years of age.
7. Against a peace officer killed while performing the officer's duty.

== See also ==
- Capital punishment in Montana
