= List of mayors of Great Falls, Montana =

The following is a list of mayors of the city of Great Falls, Montana, United States.

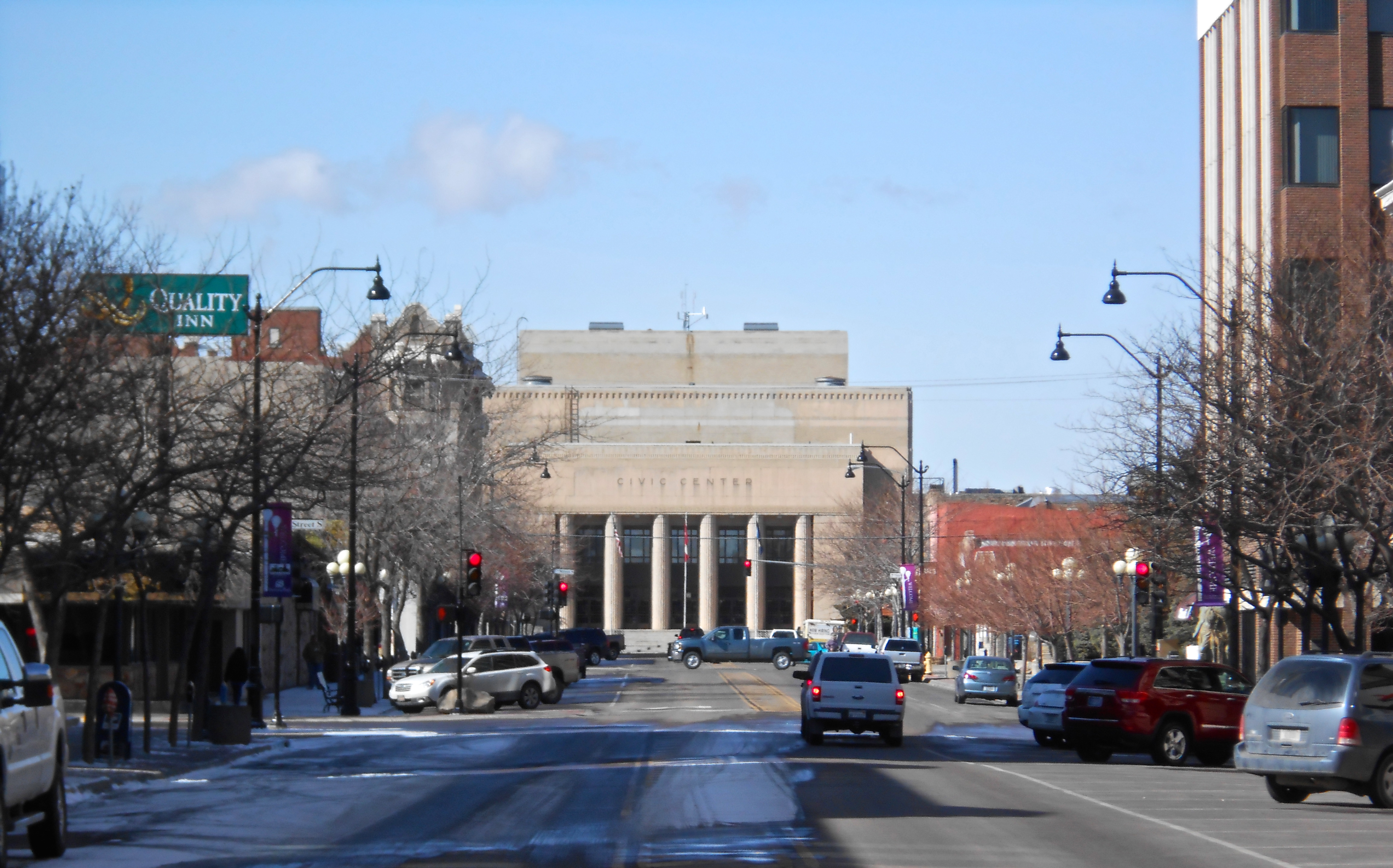
Civic Center building in Great Falls, 2013

- Paris Gibson, 1888
- J. H. Fairfield, 1889
- A.E. Dickerman, 1890
- R.R. Hotchkiss, 1891
- Chas M. Webster, 1892, 1895
- W. H. Gelsthorpe, 1893
- R. J. Fitzgerald, 1897
- John A. Collins, 1899-1902
- Jas W. Freeman, 1903-1904
- H. H. Ewing, 1905-1909
- F. P. Auerbach, 1909
- Chas. F. Murphy, 1909-1910
- James W. Speer, 1911-1913
- Newton T. Lease, 1913-1914
- Albert J. Fousek, 1915-1918, 1929-1932, 1935
- Louis Newman, 1919-1920
- R. M. Armour, 1921-1922
- Harry B. Mitchell, 1923-1928
- M.C. Grinde, 1933-1934
- J. J. Wuerthner, 1937-1940
- Ed Shields, 1941-1944
- Fritz Norby, 1945-1946
- J. C. Johnson, 1947-1948
- T. G. Bradford, 1949-1950
- J. B. Austin, 1951-1954
- Russell Conklin, 1955-1956
- John W. Steffani, 1957-1958
- William H. Swanberg, 1959-1962
- Marian S. Erdmann, 1963-1966
- John J. McLaughlin, 1967-1972
- Curtis A. Ammondson, 1973-1974
- Donald L. Ostrem, 1975-1976
- John C. Bulen, 1977-1978
- Eugene B. Thayer, 1979-1980
- Shirley A. Kuntz, c.1982, 1984-1985
- Robert A. Worthington, 1983-1984
- Roger L. Anderson, 1986-1987
- Ardi Aiken, 1988-1991
- Gayle Morris, 1992-1995
- Bob Deming, 1996-1997
- Joan Bennett, 1998-1999
- Randall H. Gray, 2000-2005
- Dona Stebbins, 2006-2010
- Michael Winters, 2010-2015
- Bob Kelly, 2016-2023
- Cory Reeves, 2024-present

== See also ==
- Great Falls history
