= 2023 Yellowstone River train derailment =

2023 derailment near Columbus, Montana

Coordinates: 45.68680°N 109.43866°W

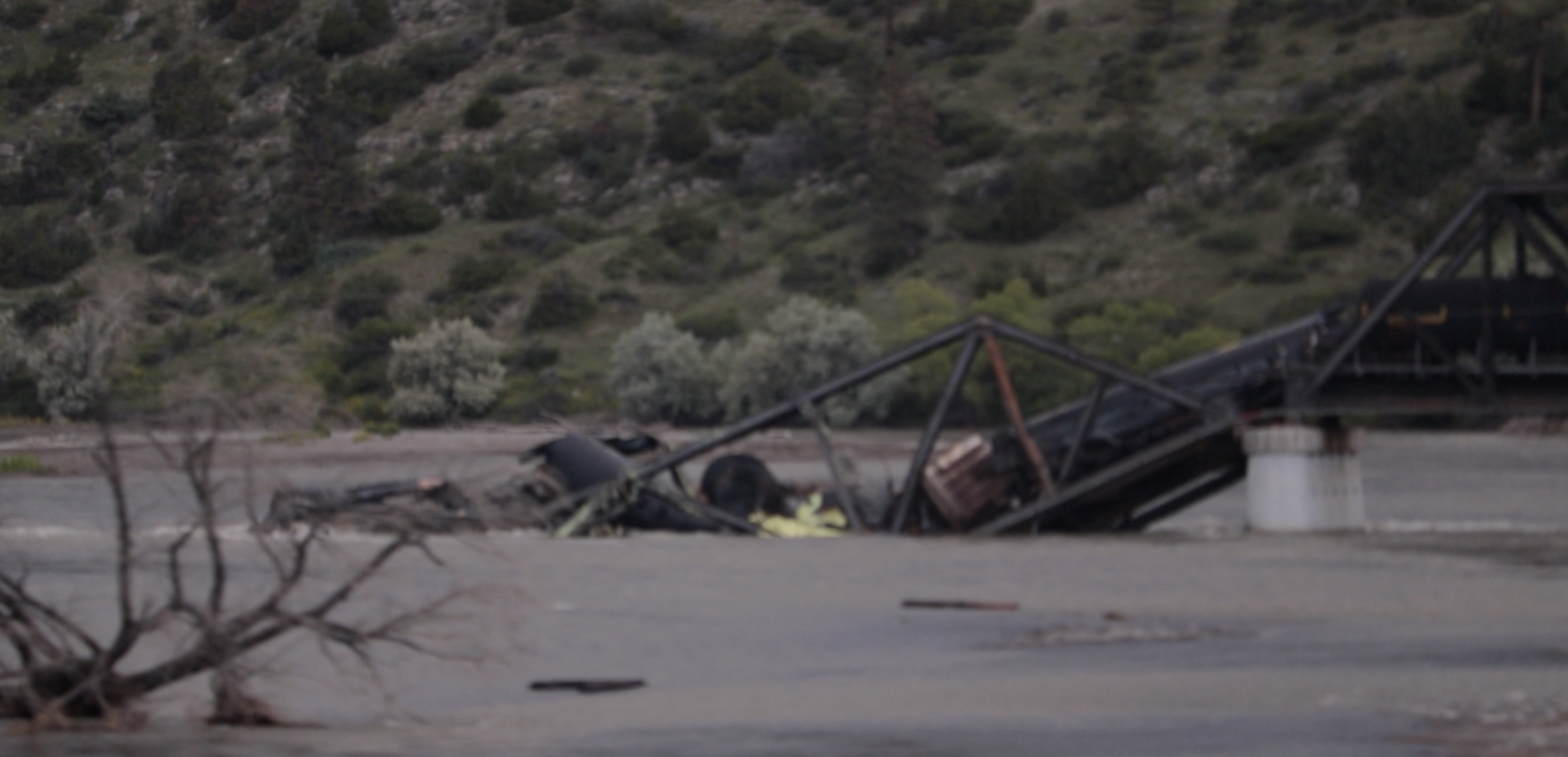
The partially collapsed truss bridge over the Yellowstone river, the derailed train is in the river and one of the tank cars has ruptured

The Yellowstone River bridge collapse was a train derailment that occurred on June 24, 2023, near Columbus, Montana, United States. A bridge that crosses the Yellowstone River collapsed, causing several cars of a freight train carrying hazardous materials to fall into the water below. The incident resulted in environmental concerns and internet service disruptions in the state.

The bridge was part of the Montana Rail Link (MRL) network, a privately owned regional railroad that operates over 900 miles of track in Montana and Idaho. The train involved in the derailment was carrying hot asphalt and molten sulfur, which are both flammable. Sulfur is used in phosphate fertilizer production and for direct soil supplement. Hot sulfur burns easily, producing toxic sulfur dioxide. The train crew was safe and no injuries were reported.

== Collapse ==
The collapse occurred around 6 a.m. local time on June 24, 2023. The cause of the collapse is under investigation, but some experts have suggested that repeated years of heavy river flows may have eroded the river bottom and weakened the bridge structure. The adjacent Twin Bridges Road Bridge constructed in 1931 was demolished in 2021 after decades of riverbed bridge scour had undermined its concrete piers and the Montana Department of Transportation had determined it was in danger of collapse. The river was swollen with recent heavy rains at the time of the derailment.

== Aftermath ==
The collapse triggered an emergency response from local, state and federal agencies. Officials shut down drinking water intakes downstream while they evaluated the danger after the derailment. The Yellowstone County Disaster and Emergency Services asked residents to conserve water and implemented precautions at water treatment plants, irrigation districts and industrial companies. The Montana Department of Environmental Quality said it was monitoring the water quality and potential impacts to fish and wildlife. An Associated Press reporter witnessed a yellow substance coming out of some of the tank cars.

The collapse also took out a fiber-optic cable providing internet service to many customers in the state, including the high-speed provider Global Net. The company said it was working to restore service as soon as possible. Montana Gov. Greg Gianforte tweeted that he was monitoring the situation and that the state was standing by to support MRL and county officials. MRL said it was committed to addressing any potential impacts and working to understand the reasons behind the crash.
