= List of mayors of Bozeman, Montana =

The following is a list of mayors of the city of Bozeman, Montana, United States.

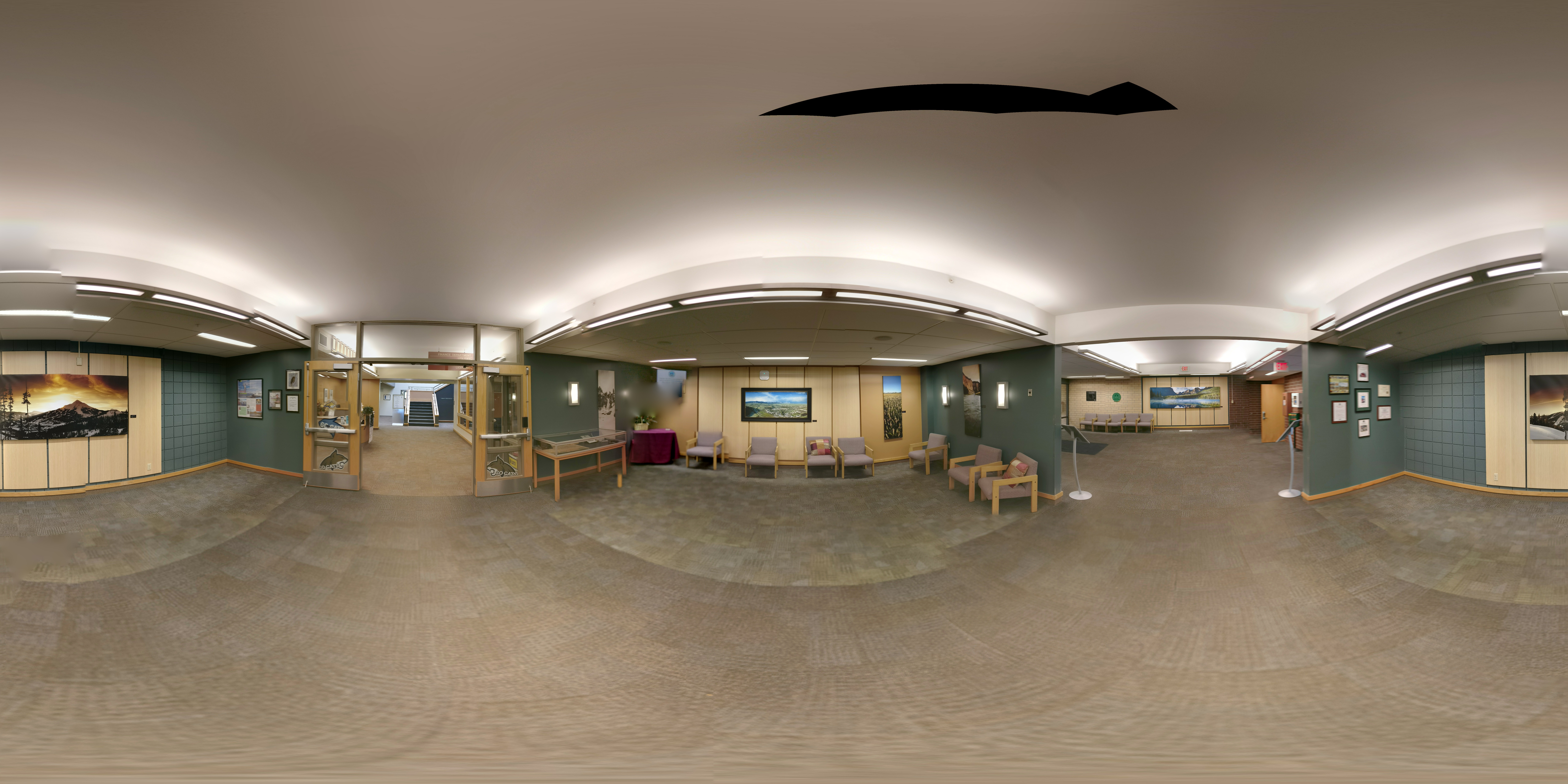
Interior of city hall building in Bozeman, Montana (photo 2017)

- John V. Bogert, c.1883-1885, 1887-1890, 1891-1892, 1897-1899
- Samuel W. Langhorn, c.1885-1886
- George W. Monroe, c.1886-1887
- H. A. Pease, c.1890-1891
- George L. Ramsey, c.1892-1895
- F. L. Benepe, c.1895-1897
- William M. Alward, c.1899-1901
- H. W. Foster, c.1901-1902
- P. T. Morris, c.1902-1905
- Nelson Story Jr., c.1905-1907
- Charles P. Manry, c.1907-1909, 1911-1912
- A. G. Berthot, c.1909-1911
- H. S. Buell, c.1912-1915
- John A. Luce, c.1915-1917
- L. W. Truitt, c.1917-1919
- C. W. Sweet, c.1919-1921
- E. J. Parkin, c.1921
- Amos C. Hall, c.1921-1923
- Edmund Burke, c.1924-1927
- E. G. B. Hill, c.1928-1929
- W. N. Purdy, c.1930-1931
- Claud P. Steffens, c.1932-1933
- Whitfield W. Spain, c.1934-1935
- J. L. Ketterer, c.1936-1937
- August H. Lake, c.1938-1939
- Frank E. Hoey, c.1940-1941
- A. G. 'Paul' Busch, c.1942-1943
- Hjalmar B. Landoe, c.1944-1945
- J. Harry Healy, c.1945-1947
- Charles W. Sorenson, c.1948-1949
- W. Gilbert Lowe, c.1950-1951, 1954-1955
- Walter A. Secor, c.1952-1953
- Arnold M. Swanson, c.1956-1957, 1960-1961
- W. Howard Erwin, c.1958-1959
- Fred M. Staudaher, c.1962-1963
- R. Harry Morrow, c.1964-1965, 1968-1969
- Edmund P. Sedivy Sr., c.1966-1967, 1974-1975, 1977-1979
- Don M. Langohr Jr., c.1970-1971
- William E. Grabow, c.1972-1973
- James W. Vollmer, c.1976-1977
- Duncan S. MacNab, c.1980-1981
- Alfred M. Stiff, c.1982-1983, 1988-1989, 1998-1999
- Kenneth L. Weaver, c.1984-1985
- Judith A. Mathrie, c.1986-1987
- Robert L. Hawks, c.1990-1991
- Timothy Swanson, c.1992-1993
- John C. Vincent, c.1994-1995
- Don E. Stueck, c.1996-1997
- Marcia B. Youngman, c.1999-2001
- Steven R. Kirchhoff, c.2002-2003
- Andrew L. Cetraro, c.2004-2005
- Jeffrey K. Krauss, c.2006-2007, 2010-2015
- Kaaren Jacobson, c.2008-2009
- Cyndy Andrus, c.2016-2023
- Terry Cunningham, 2024-2026
- Joey Morrison, 2026-present

== See also ==
- Bozeman history
