= History of Montana =

This is a broad outline of the history of Montana in the United States.

For thousands of years indigenous peoples inhabited what would be Montana. The Louisiana Purchase in 1803 included this land and it was explored during the Lewis and Clark Expedition. The first permanent settlement by Euro-Americans was St. Mary's, established in 1841 near present-day Stevensville. The Montana Territory was established in 1864 and Montana officially became a state on November 8, 1889.

== Prehistory ==
Lake Missoula was a prehistoric proglacial lake in western Montana that existed periodically at the end of the last ice age between 15,000 and 13,000 years ago.

== Indigenous peoples ==
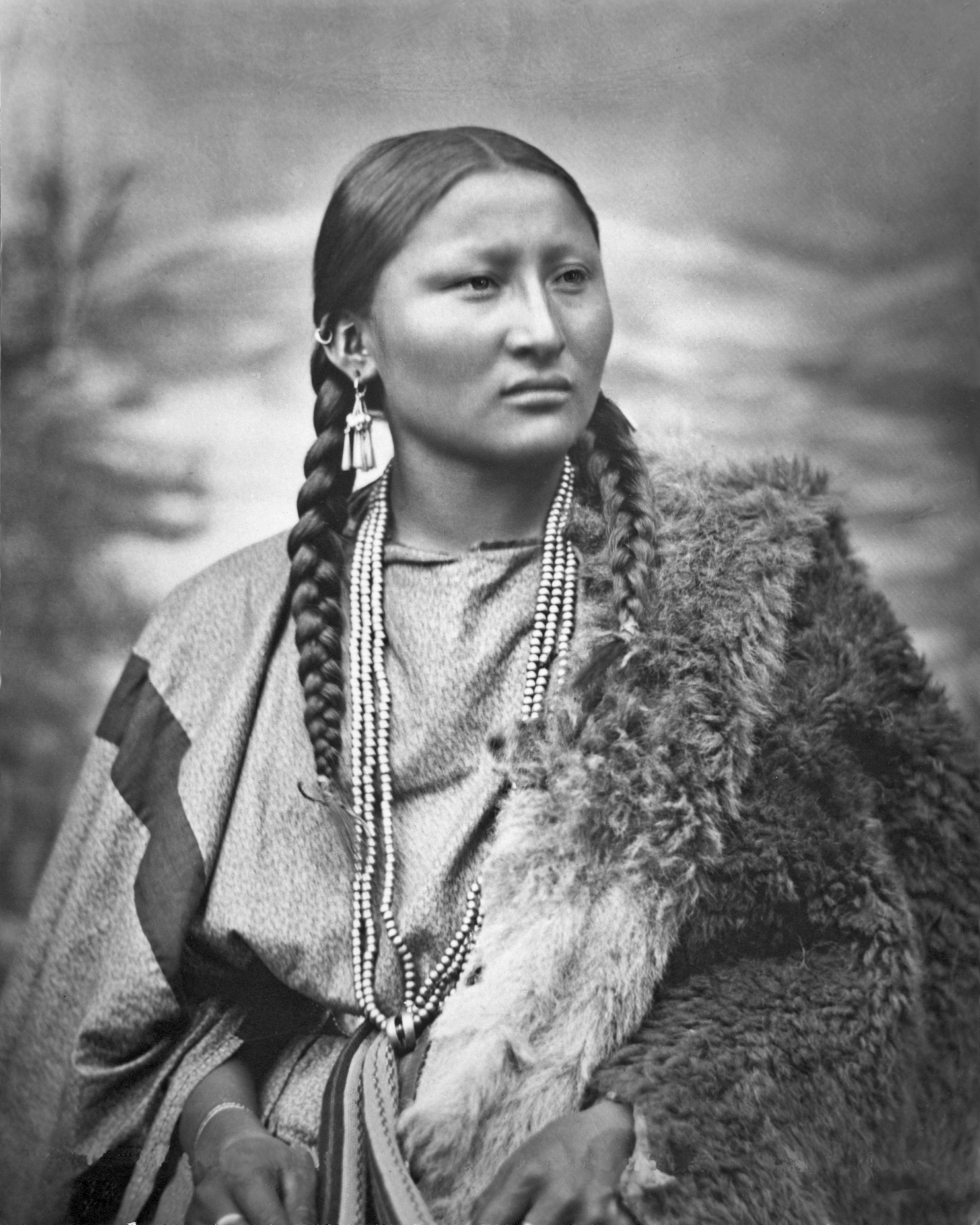
Pretty Nose at Fort Keogh, 1879

Archeological evidence has shown that Paleo-Indians lived in the area beginning more than 12,000 years ago. The oldest dated human burial site in North America was located in 1968 near Wilsall, Montana at what is now known as the Anzick site (named for the discoverers). The human remains of a male infant, found at the Anzick site along with Clovis culture artifacts, establish the earliest known human habitation in what is now Montana. In 2014 a group of scientists released the results of a major project in which they successfully reconstructed the genome of the Anzick boy, providing the first genetic evidence that the Clovis people were descended from Asians, and are related to modern Native Americans. Most indigenous people of the region were nomadic, following the buffalo herds and other game and living by seasonal cycles. Several major tribal groups made their home in and around the land that later became Montana.

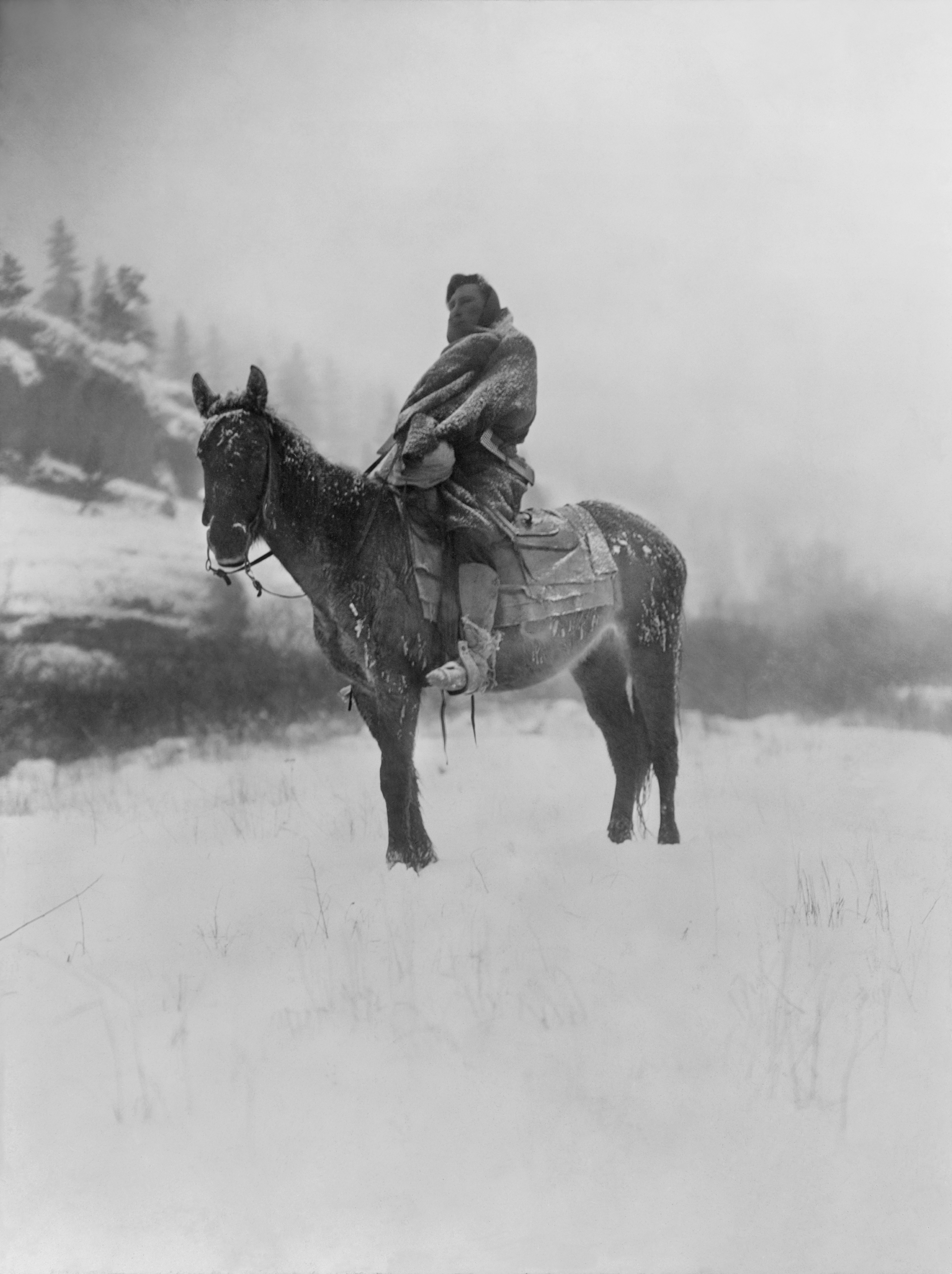
The Scout in Winter, Crow, 1908 by Edward S. Curtis

The Crow, also known as the Apsáalooke, were the first of the native nations currently living in Montana to arrive in the region. Around 1700 AD they moved from Alberta to south-central Montana and northern Wyoming. In the 19th century, Crow warriors were allies and scouts for the United States Army The modern Crow Indian Reservation is Montana's largest reservation, located in southeastern Montana along the Big Horn River, in the vicinity of Hardin, Montana.

The Cheyenne have a reservation in the southeastern portion of the state, east and adjacent to the Crow. The Cheyenne language is part of the larger Algonquian language group, but it is one of the few Plains Algonquian languages to have developed tonal characteristics. The closest linguistic relatives of the Cheyenne language are Arapaho and Ojibwa. Little is known about the Cheyenne people before the 16th century when they were first recorded in European explorers' and traders' accounts.

The Blackfeet reservation today is located in northern Montana adjacent to Glacier National Park. Prior to the reservation era, the Blackfoot were fiercely independent and highly successful warriors whose territory stretched from the North Saskatchewan River along what is now Edmonton, Alberta in Canada, to the Yellowstone River of Montana, and from the Rocky Mountains east to the Saskatchewan River. Their nation consisted of three main branches, the Piegan, the Blood, and the Siksika. In the summer, they lived a nomadic, hunting lifestyle, and in the winter, the Blackfeet people lived in various winter camps dispersed perhaps a day's march apart along a wooded river valley. They did not move camp in winter unless food for the people and horses or firewood became depleted.

The Assiniboine also known by the Ojibwe exonym Asiniibwaan ("Stone Sioux"), today live on the Fort Peck Indian Reservation in Northeastern Montana shared with a branch of the Sioux nation. Intermarriage has led to some of the people now identifying as "Assiniboine Sioux". Prior to the reservation era, they inhabited the Northern Great Plains area of North America, specifically present-day Montana and parts of Saskatchewan, Alberta and southwestern Manitoba around the US/Canada border. They were well known throughout much of the late 18th and early 19th centuries. Images of Assiniboine people were painted by such 19th-century artists as Karl Bodmer and George Catlin. The Assiniboine have many similarities to the Lakota Sioux in lifestyle, language, and cultural habits. They are considered a band of the Nakoda, or middle division of the Sioux nation. Pooling their research, historians, linguists and anthropologists have concluded the Assiniboine broke away from the Lakota and Dakota Sioux bands in the 17th century.

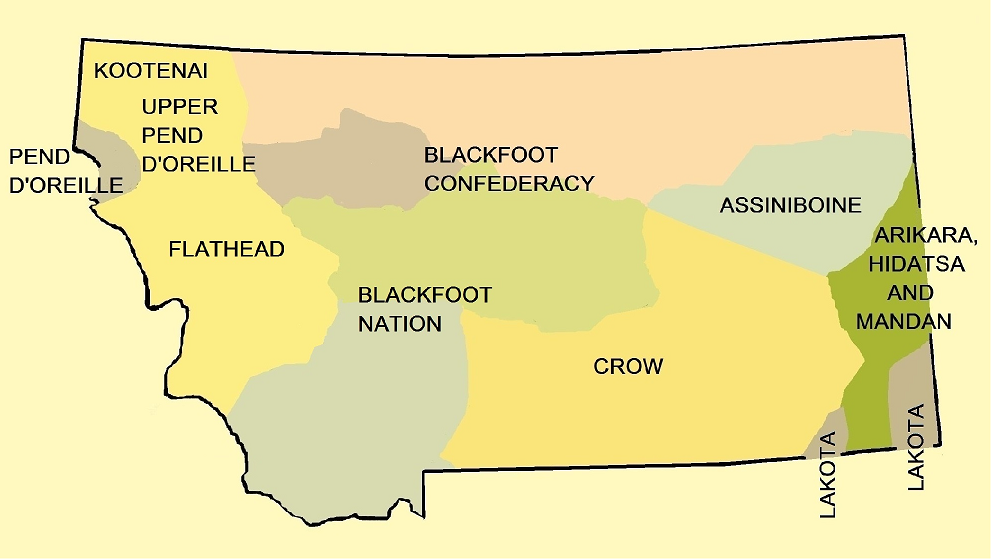
Early tribal treaty territories in Montana

The Gros Ventre are located today in north-central Montana and govern the Fort Belknap Indian Reservation. Gros Ventre, meaning "Big Bellies" in French, is a name of unknown origin. The people call themselves (autonym) A'ani or A'aninin (white clay people), perhaps related to natural physical formations. They were called the Atsina by the Assiniboine. The Ajani has 3,682 members and they share Fort Belknap Indian Reservation with the Assiniboine, though the two were traditional enemies. The Ajani is classified as a band of Arapaho; they speak a variant of Arapaho called Gros Ventre or Atsina.

The Kootenai people live west of the Continental Divide. The Kootenai name is also spelled Kutenai or Ktunaxa /ˈkuːtəneɪ/. They are one of three tribes of the Confederated Salish and Kootenai Tribes of the Flathead Nation in Montana, and they form the Ktunaxa Nation in British Columbia, Canada. There are also Kootenai populations in Idaho and Washington. The Salish and Pend Oreilles people also live on the Flathead Indian Reservation. The smaller Pend d'Oreille and Kalispell tribes originally lived around Flathead Lake and the western mountains, respectively.

The territories of the different tribes were defined by multiple and varied treaties with the United States, generally shrinking their land boundaries with each revision.

The Ojibwe and Cree people today jointly share the Rocky Boy's Reservation in north-central Montana. Rocky Boy's reservation was created after most of the others as a home for some of the "landless" tribes who did not obtain reservation lands elsewhere. The creation of the reservation was largely due to the efforts of the Chippewa leader Stone Child (aka "Rocky Boy"). The Little Shell Chippewa also have a presence in Montana, however they do not have a reservation.

Other native people had a significant presence in Montana, though today do not have a reservation within the state. These nations included the Lakota, the Arapaho, and the Shoshone. The Kiowa and the Kiowa-Apache claim an early history in the late 17th century) as nomadic hunters between the Yellowstone and Missouri.

== Louisiana Purchase ==
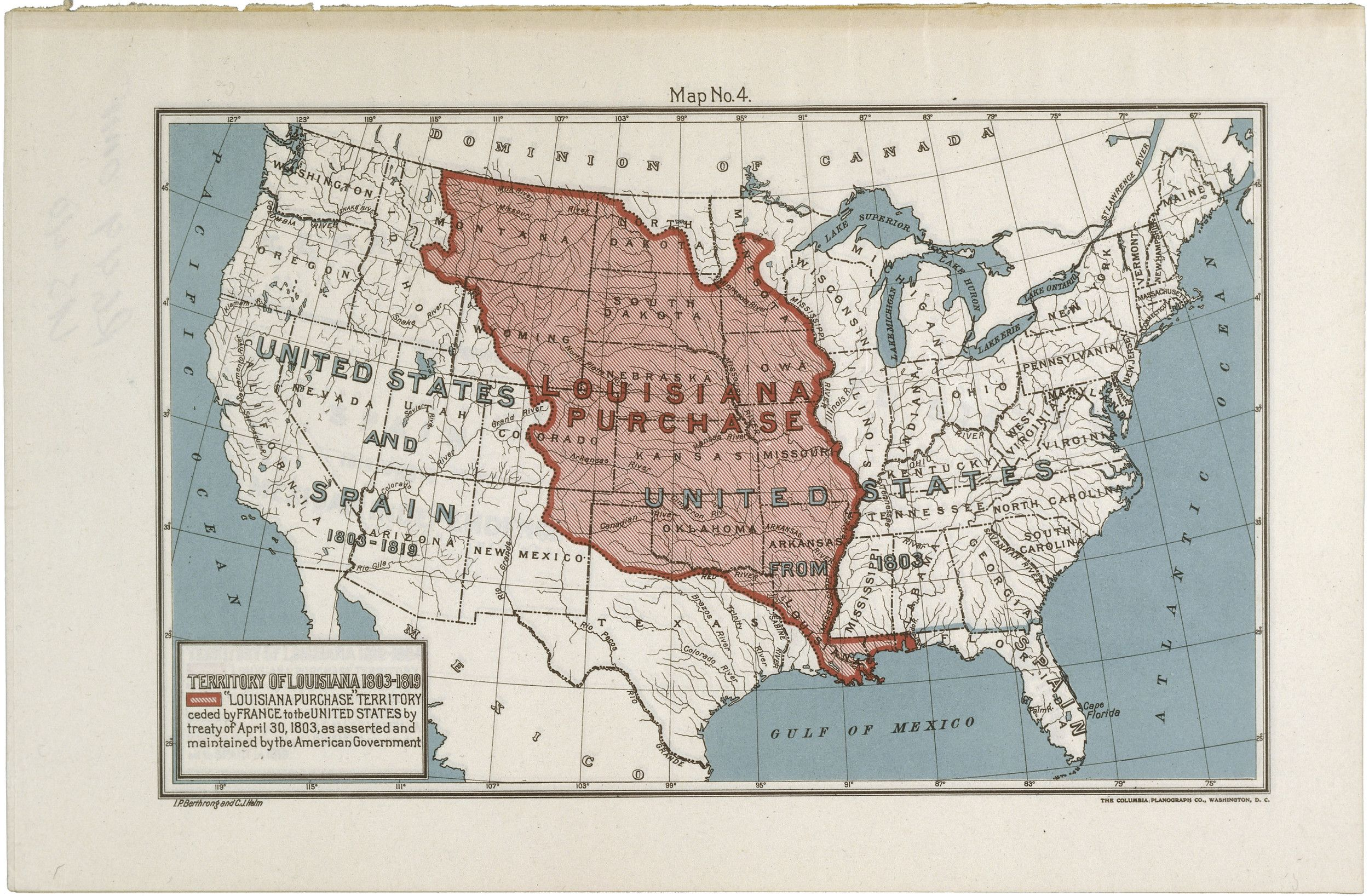
From Frank Bond, "Louisiana" and the Louisiana Purchase. Government Printing Office, 1912 Map No. 4.

On April 30, 1803, the Louisiana Purchase Treaty was signed by representatives of the U.S. at Paris, France. The United States Senate ratified the treaty on October 20 and President Thomas Jefferson announced the treaty to the American people on July 4, 1803. The area covered by the purchase included much of the present-day United States between the Continental Divide and the Mississippi River, encompassing the Great Plains including part of what is now Montana, particularly the Missouri River drainage. The rights to the Louisiana Purchase territory cost the U.S. $15 million, which came out to an average of 3 cents an acre. On March 10, 1804, a formal ceremony was conducted in St. Louis, Missouri, to transfer ownership of the territory from France to the United States of America. The lands of present-day Montana were practically unknown and too distant from the seats of power for this political boundary change to have much impact upon them, but the Louisiana Purchase would prove a sea-change for the area.

== Lewis and Clark Expedition ==
The Louisiana Purchase sparked interest in knowing the character of the lands the nation had purchased, including their flora and fauna and the peoples who inhabited them. President Thomas Jefferson, an advocate of exploration and scientific inquiry, had the Congress appropriate $2,500 for an expedition up the Missouri River and down the Columbia River to the Pacific Ocean. He had envisioned an expedition of this nature since at least the early 1790s, due to his driving interest to secure a route for the U.S. to trade interests on the Pacific coast. Jefferson tapped his personal secretary, Meriwether Lewis, to lead the expedition, and Lewis recruited William Clark, an experienced soldier and frontiersman who became an equal co-leader of the Lewis and Clark Expedition. They were to study, map and record information on the native people, natural history, geology, terrain, and river systems. The expedition floated up the Missouri River, making winter camp near the Mandan villages, east of the present border of Montana and North Dakota. The following spring, the Corps of Discovery ascended to the headwaters of the Missouri River, obtained horses from the Shoshone people to cross the Continental Divide, eventually floating down the Columbia River to the Pacific Ocean.

On the return trip heading east through present-day Montana, in July 1806, after again crossing the Continental Divide, the Corps split into two groups so Lewis could explore and map the Marias River and Clark could do the same on the Yellowstone River. While proceeding down the Yellowstone, Clark signed his name 25 miles (40 km) northeast of modern-day Billings. The inscription consists of his signature and the date July 25, 1806. Clark named the pillar after Jean Baptiste Charbonneau, nicknamed "Pompy", the son of Sacagawea, a Shoshone woman who had helped to guide the expedition and, along with her husband Toussaint Charbonneau, had acted as an interpreter. Clark's inscription is the only remaining physical evidence found along the route that was followed by the expedition. In the meantime, Lewis' group descending the Marias met a small party of Piegan Blackfeet. Their initial meeting was cordial, but during the night, the Blackfeet tried to steal their weapons. In the ensuing struggle, two men were killed, the only native deaths attributable to the expedition. To prevent further bloodshed, the group of four—Lewis, Drouillard, and the two Field brothers—fled over 100 miles (160 km) in a day before they camped again. Lewis's and Clark's separate parties rejoined one another at the confluence of the Yellowstone and Missouri rivers on August 12, 1806. Thus reunited, and heading downstream, they were able to quickly return to St. Louis. During the trip, the expedition spent more of its time in what today is Montana than any other place.

== First settlements ==
St. Mary's Mission was the first permanent European settlement in Montana. Through interactions with Iroquois between 1812 and 1820, the Salish people learned about Christianity and the Jesuit missionaries (known as "blackrobes"), who worked with Native tribes teaching about agriculture, medicine, and religion. Interest in these "blackrobes" grew among the Salish. In 1831, four young Salish men were dispatched to St. Louis, Missouri to request a "blackrobe" to return with them to their homeland in the Bitterroot Valley. The four Salish men were directed to the home and office of William Clark (of Lewis and Clark fame) to make their request. At that time Clark was in charge of administering the territory they called home. Through the perils of their trip, two died at the home of General Clark. The remaining two secured a visit with St. Louis Bishop Joseph Rosati, who assured them that missionaries would be sent to the Bitterroot Valley when funds and missionaries were available in the future.

Again in 1835 and 1837 the Salish people dispatched men to St. Louis to request missionaries but to no avail. Finally in 1839 a group of Iroquois and Salish met Father Pierre-Jean DeSmet in Council Bluffs, Iowa. The meeting resulted in Father DeSmet promising to fulfill their request for a missionary the following year. DeSmet arrived in present-day Stevensville on September 24, 1841, and called the settlement St. Mary's Mission. Construction of a chapel immediately began, followed by other permanent structures including log cabins and Montana's first pharmacy.

In 1850 Major John Owen arrived in the valley and set up camp north of St. Mary's. In time, Major Owen established a trading post and military strong point named Fort Owen, which served the Native people, settlers, and missionaries in the valley.

== Military history ==
=== Fort Benton ===
One of the first permanent settlements in Montana was Fort Benton, established as a fur trading post in 1847. It was named in honor of Senator Thomas Hart Benton, who encouraged settlement of the West. The U.S. Army took over the commercial fort in 1869 and a detachment of the 7th Infantry remained in the town until 1881. Its location on the Missouri River marked the farthest practical point upriver that steamboats could navigate. With the arrival of the first steamboats in 1860, the town of Fort Benton began to develop outside the fort's walls and developed into a major trading center over the next 27 years, until it was supplanted with the arrival of railroads in the Montana Territory. An original blockhouse still remaining in the largely reconstructed fort is the oldest building in Montana still on its original foundations, giving rise to the town's reputation as "the birthplace of Montana".

=== Fort Ellis ===
Built near the head of the Gallatin Valley, Fort Ellis played an important role in many of the early Indian conflicts in the territory. Elements of the 2nd Cavalry stationed here took part in both the Marias Massacre and the Great Sioux War of 1876-77. It also provided a staging location for many missions of exploration and survey into the region that became Yellowstone National Park.

=== Fort Shaw ===
Fort Shaw was established in the spring of 1867 located west of Great Falls in the Sun River Valley. Two posts built at the time were Camp Cooke on the Judith River and Fort C.F. Smith on the Bozeman Trail in south central Montana Territory. Fort Shaw was built of adobe and lumber by the 13th Infantry. The fort had a parade ground that was 400 feet (120 m) square, and consisted of barracks for officers, a hospital, and a trading post, and could house up to 450 soldiers. The soldiers mainly guarded the Benton-Helena Road, the major supply-line from Fort Benton, which was the head of navigation on the (trigger) Missouri River, to the gold mining districts in southwestern Montana Territory. The fort was decommissioned in 1891. The following year, 1892, the 20 buildings on the site were adapted for the Fort Shaw Indian Industrial School. The school boarded young Native people to assimilate them, teach them English, and educate them in modern technology; it had as many as 17 faculty members, 11 Native assistants, and 300 students.

== Montana Territory ==
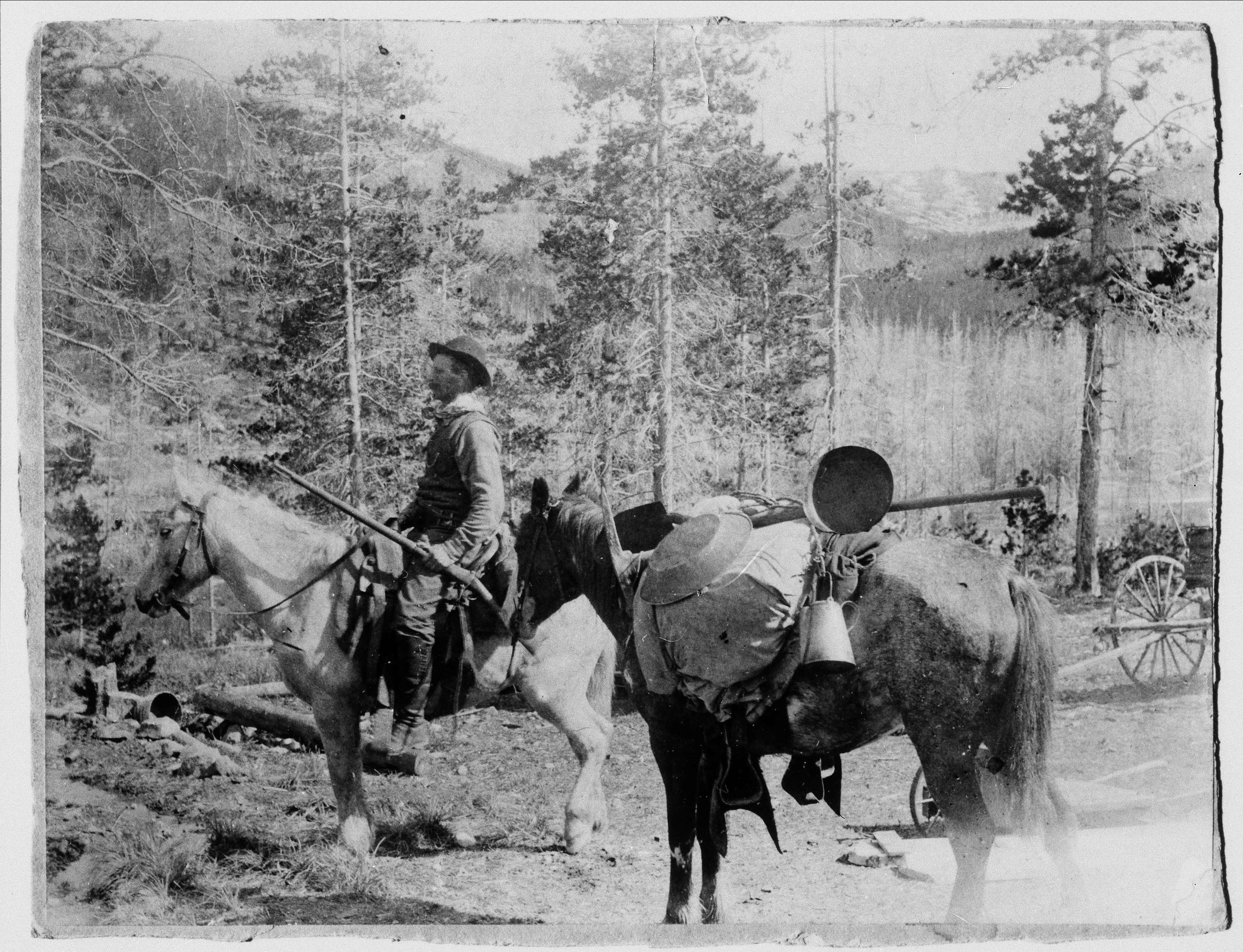
Swedish gold panners in 1860s Montana. The Montana gold rush began in 1862.

After the discovery of gold in the region, Montana was designated as a United States territory (Montana Territory) on May 26, 1864, and, with rapid population growth, as the 41st state on November 8, 1889.

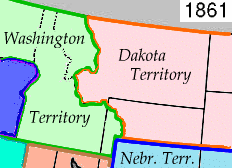
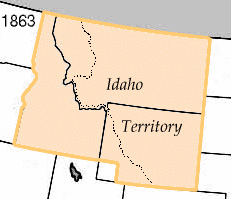
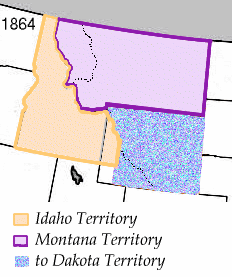
The reorganization of the Idaho Territory in 1864, showing the newly created Montana Territory.

Montana territory was organized from the existing Idaho Territory by Act of Congress and signed into law by President Abraham Lincoln on May 28, 1864. The areas east of the continental divide had been previously part of the Nebraska and Dakota territories and had been acquired by the United States in the Louisiana Purchase.

The territory also included land west of the continental divide, which had been acquired by the United States in the Oregon Treaty, and originally included in the Oregon Territory. (The part of the Oregon Territory that became part of Montana had been split off as part of the Washington Territory.)

The boundary between the Washington Territory and Dakota Territory was the Continental Divide (as shown on the 1861 map); however, the boundary between the Idaho Territory and the Montana Territory followed the Bitterroot Range north of 46°30'N (as shown on the 1864 map). Popular legend says a drunken survey party followed the wrong mountain ridge and mistakenly moved the boundary west into the Bitterroot Range.

Contrary to legend, the boundary is precisely where the United States Congress intended. The Organic Act of the Territory of Montana defines the boundary as extending from the modern intersection of Montana, Idaho, and Wyoming at:

the forty-fourth degree and thirty minutes of north latitude; thence due west along said forty-fourth degree and thirty minutes of north latitude to a point formed by its intersection with the crest of the Rocky Mountains; thence following the crest of the Rocky Mountains northward till its intersection with the Bitter Root Mountains; thence northward along the crest of the Bitter Root Mountains to its intersection with the thirty-ninth degree of longitude west from Washington; thence along said thirty-ninth degree of longitude northward to the boundary line of the British possessions.

The boundaries of Montana territory did not change during its existence. Montana was admitted to the Union as the state of Montana on November 8, 1889.

== Indian Wars ==
=== Battle of the Little Big Horn ===
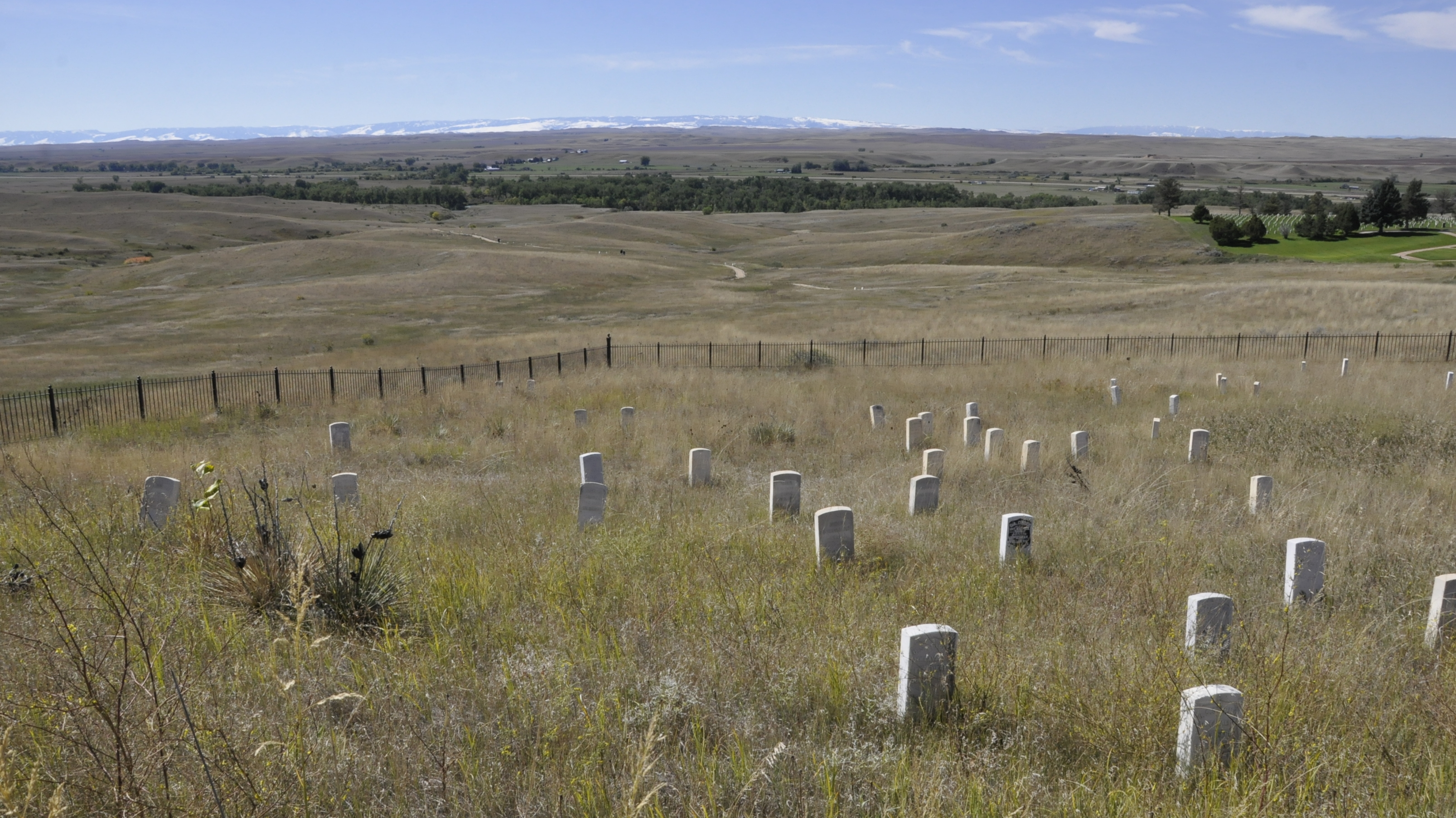
Custer National Cemetery at Little Bighorn Battlefield

The Battle of the Little Bighorn—also called Custer's Last Stand and the Battle of the Greasy Grass—was an armed engagement between a Lakota (Sioux)-Northern Cheyenne-Arapaho combined force and the 7th Cavalry of the United States Army. It occurred June 25 – 26, 1876, near the Little Bighorn River in eastern Montana Territory near present-day Hardin, Montana, on land that today is part of the Crow Indian Reservation. The Crow tribe sided with the U.S. army. George Armstrong Custer, with 257 troops attacked a much larger force of Native Americans, who were defending their civilian encampments, and in three hours the Custer battalion was completely annihilated. Only two men from the 7th Cavalry later claimed to have seen the battle: a young Crow whose name translated as Curley, and a trooper named Peter Thompson, who had fallen behind Custer's column, and most accounts of the last moments of Custer's forces are conjecture. Lakota accounts assert that Crazy Horse personally led one of the large groups of Lakota who overwhelmed the cavalry. While exact numbers are difficult to determine, it is commonly estimated that the Northern Cheyenne and Lakota outnumbered the 7th Cavalry by approximately 3:1, a ratio that was extended to 5:1 during the fragmented parts of the battle.

Later, the Sioux were defeated in a series of subsequent battles by the reinforced U.S. Army who continued attacking even in the winter, and most were forced to move onto reservations, mostly outside of Montana, primarily by tactics such as preventing buffalo hunts and enforcing government food-distribution policies to "friendlies" only. The Lakota were compelled to sign a treaty in 1877 ceding the Black Hills to the United States, but a low-intensity war continued, culminating, fourteen years later, in the killing of Sitting Bull (December 15, 1890) at Standing Rock and the Wounded Knee Massacre (December 29, 1890) at Pine Ridge.

=== Northern Cheyenne exodus ===
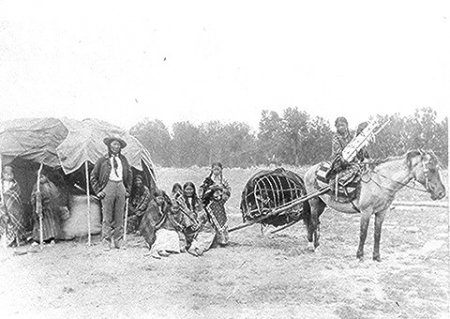
Stump Horn and family (Northern Cheyenne); showing home and horse-drawn travois.

Following the Battle of the Little Bighorn, attempts by the U.S. Army to capture the Cheyenne intensified. A group of 972 Cheyenne was escorted to Indian Territory in Oklahoma in 1877. The government intended to re-unite the Northern and Southern Cheyenne into one nation. There the conditions were dire; the Northern Cheyenne were not used to the climate and soon many became ill with malaria. In addition, the food rations were insufficient and of poor quality. In 1878, the two principal Chiefs, Little Wolf and Morning Star (Dull Knife) pressed for the release of the Cheyenne so they could travel back north. However, they were denied permission, so that same year the two men led a group of 353 Northern Cheyenne who left Indian Territory to travel back north. The Army and other civilian volunteers were in hot pursuit of the Cheyenne as they traveled north. It is estimated that a total of 13,000 Army soldiers and volunteers were sent to pursue the Cheyenne over the whole course of their journey north.

After crossing into Nebraska, the group split into two. One group was led by Little Wolf, and the other by Dull Knife. Little Wolf and his band made it back to Montana. Dull Knife and his band were captured and escorted to Fort Robinson, Nebraska and sequestered. They were ordered to return to Oklahoma but they refused. Conditions at the fort grew tense through the end of 1878 and soon the Cheyenne were confined to barracks with no food, water, or heat. In January 1879, Dull Knife and his group broke out of Ft. Robinson. Much of the group was gunned down as they ran away from the fort, and others were discovered near the fort during the following days and ordered to surrender but most of the escapees chose to fight because they would rather be killed than taken back into custody. It is estimated that only 50 survived the breakout, including Dull Knife. Several of the escapees later had to stand trial for the murders that had been committed in Kansas. The remains of those killed were repatriated in 1994.

Ultimately, the military gave up attempting to relocate the Northern Cheyenne in Oklahoma. The persistence of the Northern Cheyenne resulted in the creation of the Northern Cheyenne reservation in Montana.

=== The flight of the Nez Perce ===
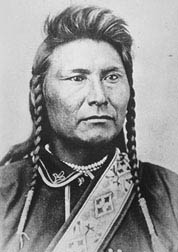
Chief Joseph

The Nez Perce people were settled what today is Washington and Oregon, though made hunting forays into western Montana. However, in 1877 pressure from white settlers led to several incidents of violence and a significant number of the Nez Perce were forced from their home region and fled rather than submit to being moved to a reservation. With 2000 U.S. soldiers in pursuit, 800 Nez Perce spent over three months outmaneuvering and battling their pursuers, led by General Howard. They traveled 1,700 miles (2,700 km) across Oregon, Washington, Idaho, Yellowstone National Park, and Montana. In the process, they held off the Army at the Battle of the Big Hole in southwestern Montana, dropped into Yellowstone Park, then traveled into east-central Montana where they attempted to ally with both the Crow and the Arapaho, but were rebuffed due to tensions surrounding the aftermath of the Battle of the Little Bighorn. They then turned north, attempting to reach Canada.

General Howard, leading the United States cavalry, was impressed with the skill with which the Nez Perce fought, using advance and rear guards, skirmish lines, and field fortifications. However, unbeknownst to the Nez Perce, a force led by Nelson A. Miles was dispatched from eastern Montana on a quick march to intercept them, which occurred less than 40 miles (64 km) south of Canada in the Bear Paw Mountains, not far from present-day Chinook in Blaine County. Finally, after a devastating five-day battle during freezing weather conditions with no food or blankets, having lost the major war leaders, Chief Joseph formally surrendered to General Miles on October 5, 1877.

=== Louis Riel and the Metis ===
Some Métis from the British territory to the north settled in Montana in the latter half of the 19th century. For a time, Louis Riel, the Métis leader from Manitoba in exile, taught school at St. Peter's Mission in Montana and was active in the local Republican Party. Democrats alleged he helped Métis men, who were not American citizens, to vote for the Republicans. In the summer of 1884, a delegation of Métis leaders including Gabriel Dumont and James Isbister, convinced Riel to return north, where in the following year he led the Métis revolt against Canadian rule, known as the North-West Rebellion. Following the defeat of the Métis rebels and the imprisonment and later hanging of Riel, Gabriel Dumont fled to exile in Montana.

== Railroads ==
The railroads were the engine of settlement in the state. Major development occurred in the 1880s. The Northern Pacific Railroad was given land grants by the federal government so that it could borrow money to build its system, reaching Billings in 1882. The federal government kept every other section of land, and gave it away to homesteaders. At first the railroad sold much of its holdings at low prices to land speculators in order to realize quick cash profits, and also to eliminate sizable annual tax bills. The speculators in turn parceled out the land on credit to farmers and ranchers eager to develop operations near a railroad. By 1905 the company changed its land policies as it realized it had been a costly mistake to have sold so much land at wholesale prices. With better railroad service and improved methods of farming the Northern Pacific easily sold what had been heretofore "worthless" land directly to farmers at good prices. By 1910 the railroad's holdings in North Dakota had been greatly reduced. Meanwhile, the Great Northern Railroad energetically promoted settlement along its lines in the northern part of the state. The Great Northern bought its lands from the federal government—it received no land grants—and resold them to farmers one by one. It operated agencies in Germany and Scandinavia that promoted its lands, and brought families over at low cost.

The village of Taft, located in western Montana near the Idaho border, was representative of numerous short lived railroad construction camps. In 1907-09 Taft served as a boisterous construction town for the Chicago, Milwaukee, & St. Paul Railroad. The camp included many ethnic groups, numerous saloons and prostitutes, and substantial violence. When construction was finished, the camp was abandoned.

In 1882 the Northern Pacific platted Livingston, Montana, a major division point, repair and maintenance center, and gateway to Yellowstone National Park. Built in symmetrical fashion along both sides of the track, the city grew to 7,000 by 1914. Several structures built between 1883 and 1914 still exist and provide a physical record of the era and indicate the city's role as a rail and tourist center. The Northern Pacific depot reflects the desire to impress the tourists who disembarked here for Yellowstone Park, and the railroad's machine shops reveal the city's industrial history.

== Women ==
In Montana, very few single men attempted to operate a farm or ranch; farmers clearly understood the benefits of marriage and family. A wife and numerous children could help the head of the household handle many chores, including child-rearing, feeding the family, manufacturing clothing, managing housework, feeding the hired hands, and, especially after the 1930s, handling the paperwork and financial details.

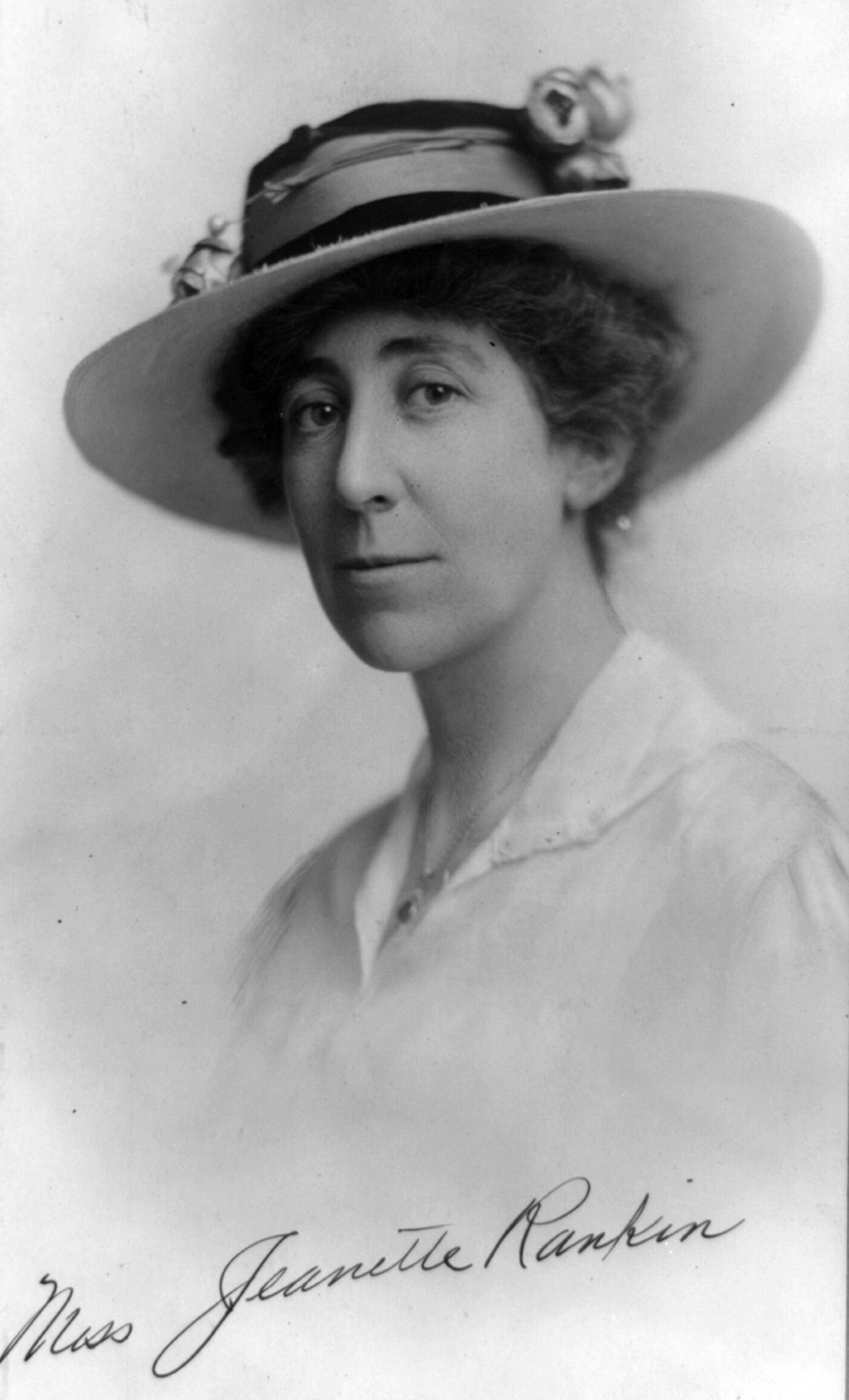
Jeannette Rankin, August 1916

Efforts to write woman suffrage into Montana's 1889 constitution failed. Montana women, especially "society women", did not strongly support the suffragists. However, help from national leaders and the efforts of Montana supporters of suffrage such as Jeannette Rankin (1880–1973), led to success in 1914 when voters ratified a suffrage amendment passed by the legislature in 1913. In 1916, Rankin, a Republican, became the first woman ever elected to Congress. She was elected again in 1940. Rankin was a peace activist, who voted against American entry into both World War I and World War II.

The status of women in the 19th-century West has drawn the attention of numerous scholars, whose interpretations fall into three types: 1) the Frontier school influenced by Frederick Jackson Turner, which argues that the West was a liberating experience for women and men; 2) the reactionists, who view the West as a place of drudgery for women, who reacted unfavorably to the isolation and difficult work environment in the West; and 3) those writers who claim the West had no distinctive effect on women's lives, that it was a static, neutral frontier. Cole (1990) uses legal records to argue that the Turner thesis best explains the improvement in women's status in Montana and the early achievement of suffrage.

Women's clubs expressed the interests, needs, and beliefs of middle-class women around the start of the 20th century. While accepting the domestic role established by the cult of domesticity, their reformist activities reveal a persistent demand for self-expression outside the home. Homesteading was a significant experience for altering women's perceptions of their roles. They expressed their aesthetic interests in gardens and organized social activities. Though these clubs allowed women to fulfill their traditional roles they also encouraged women to pursue social, intellectual, and community interests. Women took an active role in the Progressive Movement, especially in battles for suffrage, prohibition, and better schools. Women were also prominent in church activities, charity work, and crime reduction.

Childbirth was serious and sometimes life-threatening for rural women well into the 20th century. Although large families were favored by farm families, most women employed birth control methods to space their children and limit their family size. Pregnant women had little access to modern knowledge about prenatal care. Delivery was the big gamble; the great majority gave birth at home, with the services of a midwife or an experienced neighbor. Despite the increased availability of hospital care after the 1920s, modern medical benefits to mitigate the danger of childbirth were not available to most rural Montana women until the World War II era.

== Agricultural history ==
=== Cattle ranching ===
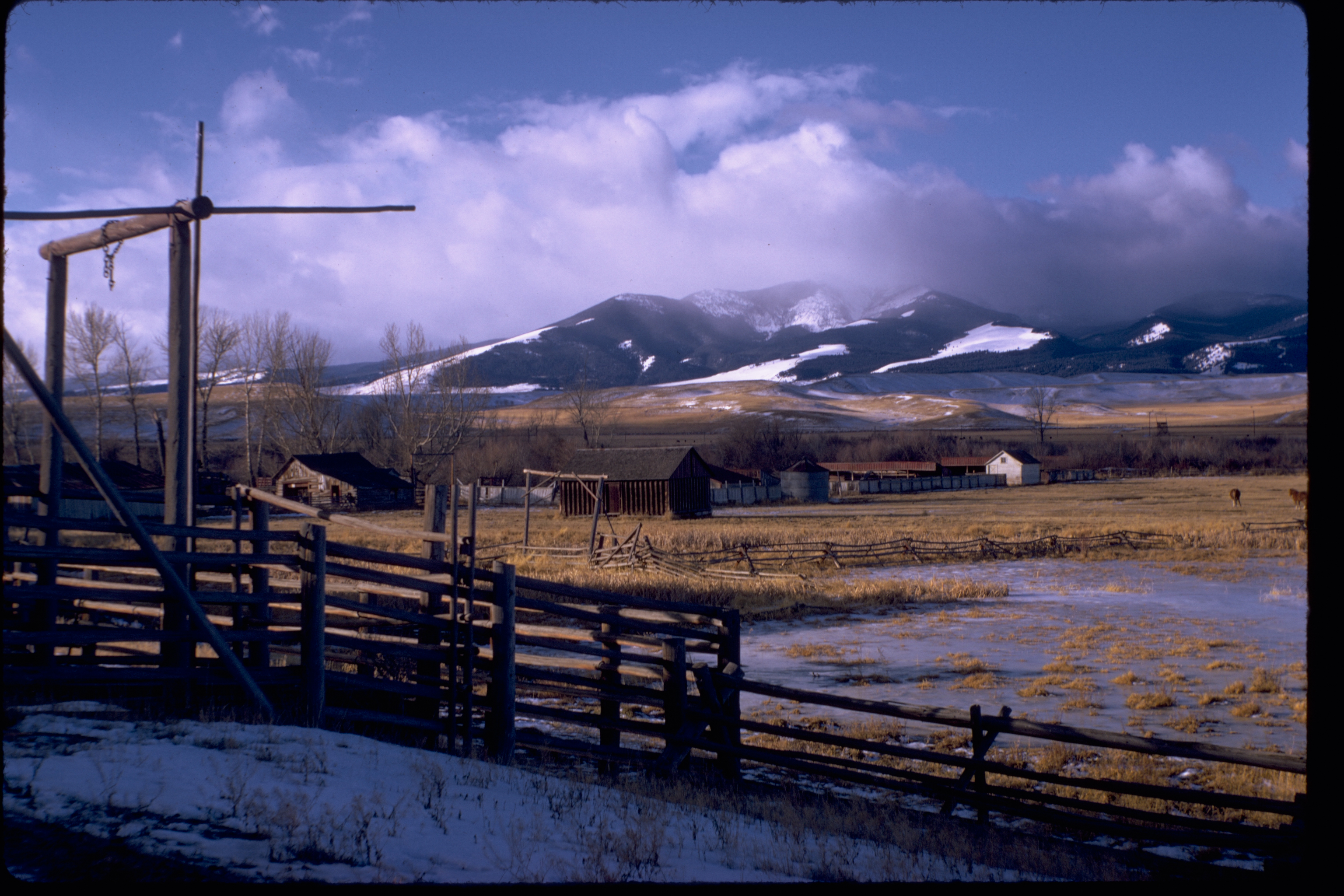
Grant-Kohrs Ranch National Historic Site, Deer Lodge, MT, date unknown

Cattle ranching has long been central to Montana's history and economy. Cattle ranching came early to Montana with the entrepreneurship of Johnny Grant in the Deer Lodge Valley in the late 1850s, who traded fat cattle to settlers in exchange for two trail-worn (but otherwise healthy) animals. He later sold his ranch to Conrad Kohrs, who developed a major cattle empire in the area. Today, Grant's core homestead is the Grant-Kohrs Ranch National Historic Site on the edge of Deer Lodge, and is maintained as a living demonstration of the ranching style of the late 19th century. It is operated by the National Park Service.

In 1866 Nelson Story brought the first herd of Texas longhorns up from Texas. Additional herds came into Montana east of the divide and initially expanded greatly on the open range. Montana stockmen and farmers survived the slump in mining during the early 1870s and were ready by mid-decade to expand eastward onto the plains, as a recovery in mining led to improved markets. However, cattle ranching expanded beyond the carrying capacity of the land, and a drought year combined with the harsh winter of 1886-1887 decimated Montana's cattle industry. The ranchers who survived began to fence in their ranches and the era of the open range came to an end.

The memories of cattle ranching form an important part of Montana's modern identity.

=== Farming ===
By 1908, the open range that had sustained Native American tribes and government-subsidized cattle barons was pockmarked with small ranchers and struggling farmers. The revised Homestead Act of the early 1900s greatly affected the settlement of Montana. This act expanded the land that was provided by the Homestead Act of 1862 from 160 acres to 320 (65 to 129 ha). When the latter act was signed by President William Taft, it also reduced the time necessary to prove up from five years to three years and permitted five months absence from the claim each year.

In 1908, the Sun River Irrigation Project, west of Great Falls was opened up for homesteading. Similar irrigation projects developed in many other Montana communities. Under this Reclamation Act, a person could obtain 40 acres (16 ha). Most of the people who came to file on these homesteads were young couples who were eager to live near the mountains where hunting and fishing were good. Many of these homesteaders came from the Midwest and Minnesota.

Farming was further encouraged by the railroads. Wheat farming started slowly in Montana, only replacing oats as the major grain crop after development of new plant strains, techniques, and machinery. Wheat was stimulated by boom prices in World War I, but slumped in value and yield during the drought and depression of the next 20 years. Beginning in 1905, the Great Northern Railway in cooperation with the US Department of Agriculture, the Montana Experiment Station, and the Dryland Farming Congress promoted dryland farming in Montana in order to increase its freight traffic. During 1910–13, the Great Northern launched its own program of demonstration farms, which stimulated settlement (during 1909–10 acreage in homesteads quadrupled in Montana) through their impressive production rates for winter wheat, barley, oats and other grains. As a result of the promotion the land along the Milk River, the northern tier, better known as the "hi‑line", was settled in 1900–15. In an area better suited to grazing cattle, inexperienced newcomers locally called "Honyockers" undertook to grow wheat, and met some early success when ample rainfall and high prices were the rule. For several years after 1918, droughts and hot winds destroyed the crops, bringing severe hardships and driving out all but the most determined of the settlers. Much of the land was acquired by stockmen, who have turned it back to grazing cattle.

== Business history ==
=== Entrepreneurs ===
Henry Sieben (1847–1937) came to Montana's gold fields in 1864, was a farm laborer, prospector, and freighter, then turned to livestock raising along the Smith River in 1870. In partnership with his brothers he raised cattle and became one of the territory's pioneer sheep ranchers in 1875. In 1879 Henry moved his stock to the Lewistown area. He established a reputation as an excellent businessman and as someone who took care of his stock and employees. After ranching in the Culbertson area, Sieben purchased ranches near Cascade and along Little Prickly Pear Creek, forming the Sieben Livestock Company. By 1907, these two ranches had become the heart of his cattle and sheep raising business which he directed from his home in Helena. Sieben became well known for his business approach to ranching and for his public and private philanthropies. His family continues to operate the Sieben Ranch Company today, and one of his descendants is United States Senator Max Sieben Baucus.

After seeing the falls of the Missouri River in central Montana, Paris Gibson (1830–1920) decided the location presented an ideal site for a town. Founding Great Falls, Montana, in 1884, Gibson was inspired by a grandiose vision of an economically prosperous city that was also beautiful. He took an active role in the development of Great Falls, as well as Montana as a whole, making his voice heard on issues from dryland farming to the humane treatment of animals. While many of his visionary ideals have long since been passed by, his efforts at community building in the West serve as a unique example and provide an important perspective on the region's continuing development.

The Conrad families built a substantial banking business in north-central and northwestern Montana during the late 19th and early 20th centuries. Banking houses at Fort Benton, Great Falls, and Kalispell, owned and managed by the families of William Conrad and Charles Conrad helped to finance Montana's economic development through an intricate pattern of familial, friendship, and business ties. Correspondent linkages to large metropolitan banks sustained the relatively small country banks by assuring them access to capital. The Conrad banks were aggressive in penetrating new lending markets and making inroads into the local farming, ranching, merchant, and manufacturing sectors. The banks grew in reputation and stature as the region developed, but remained single-unit, family-based enterprises. But Conrad's expanded across the international border into Alberta through the Conrad Circle Cattle Company.

Banking in Montana was a high risk business, as the 1920s demonstrated. Between 1921 and 1925 half of the state's 428 banks closed. There was an excessive number of small, weak banks in the grain-growing areas of Eastern Montana where the postwar slump wiped out land values and related loans.

Montana's history was heavily dominated by its "Copper Kings". Marcus Daly (1841–1900), an Irish immigrant, left a legacy of physical structures throughout Montana. Starting with his development of the Alice mine in Butte, he then founded the community of Anaconda where he built a smelter. Butte, with its mixture of poor miners' shacks, richly ornamented homes, mines, and mills, symbolized industrial mining. At Anaconda, the company town, the great Washoe Stack smelted the ore from Butte, bringing immense wealth to the region but also spewed pollutants that left the landscape downwind of the smelter wasted and barren. Daly's lumber mill at Bonner dominated the town. In the agricultural community of Hamilton, Daly built the 20,000-acre (81 km^{2}) Bitterroot Stock Farm with its, complete with racetrack and mansion. His archrival, W.A. Clark, invested heavily in the Butte mines and parlayed his influence into the political arena, engineering the selection of Helena over Anaconda as the state capitol. He later was elected as Montana's U.S. Senator under circumstances of such corruption that his antics provided one of the incentives for the Constitutional amendment allowing direct election of senators.

Simon Pepin (1840–1914), the "Father of Havre", was born in Quebec in 1840, emigrated to Montana in 1863, and became a contractor furnishing supplies for the construction of forts Custer, Assiniboine, and Maginnis. Pepin purchased ranch lands near Fort Assiniboine. When James J. Hill built the Great Northern Railway across northern Montana, Pepin convinced him to build his locomotive shops at Havre, on property owned by Pepin. In the ensuing years, Pepin was a major contributor to Havre's economic growth through his cattle, real estate, and banking enterprises.

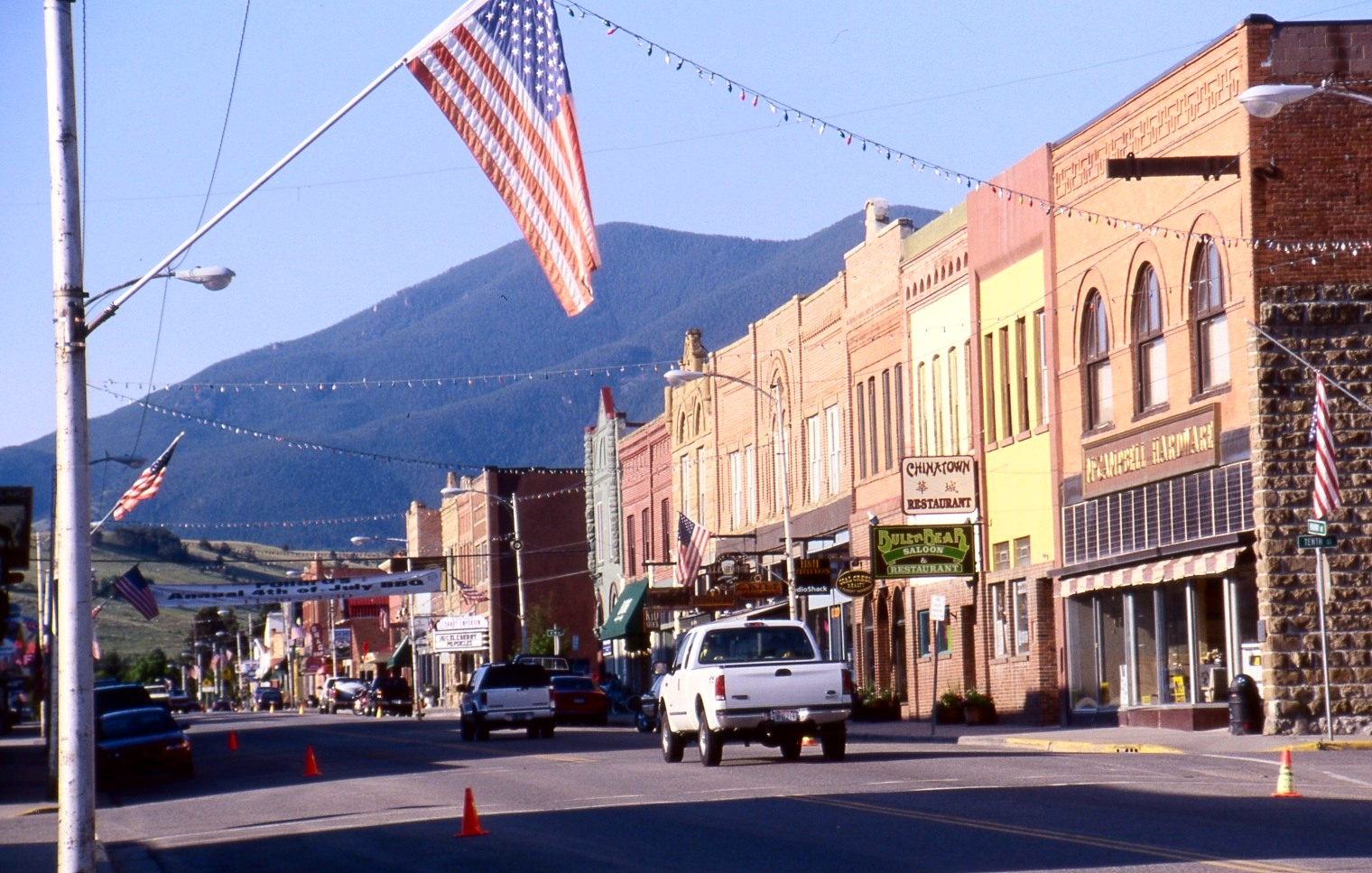
Main Street in Red Lodge, 2000, showing iron facades on buildings

Failures mixed with successes in Montana business history. The closure in 1964 of the Missoula Brewing Company exemplified the difficulties small businesses faced when competing with large producers. Opened in 1900, the brewery closed during Prohibition but resumed production of its Highlander brand in 1933. Government regulation and taxation, isolation, out-of-state competition, and limited promotion reduced the Highlander share of the market following World War II. The brewery closed in 1964 to make way for an interstate highway, ending the era of Montana-brewed beer. Rainier bought the Highlander name, but the former failure in quality control had hurt the Highlander reputation.

Many entrepreneurs built stores, shops, and offices along Main Street. The most handsome ones used pre-formed, sheet iron facades, especially those manufactured by the Mesker Brothers of St. Louis. These neoclassical, stylized facades added sophistication to brick or wood-frame buildings throughout the state.

=== Retail business ===
In the rural areas farmers and ranchers depended on general stores that had a limited stock and slow turnover; they made enough profit to stay in operation by selling at high prices. Prices were not marked on each item; instead the customer negotiated a price. Men did most of the shopping, since the main criterion was credit rather than quality of goods. Indeed, most customers shopped on credit, paying off the bill when crops or cattle were later sold; the business owner's ability to judge credit worthiness was vital to his success.

In the cities consumers had more choices, usually purchasing dry goods and supplies at locally owned department stores such as Helena's T.C. Power & Bro, which expanded into several cities, I.G. Baker & Co. in Fort Benton, Strain Bros. of Great Falls, F.A. Buttrey & Co. in Havre, and others. They had a much wider selection of goods than in the country general stores and price tags that gave the actual selling price. Department stores provided limited credit, and set up attractive displays and, after 1900, window displays as well. Their clerks were experienced salesmen whose knowledge of the products appealed to the better educated middle-class women who did most of the shopping. The keys to success were a large variety of high-quality brand-name merchandise, high turnover, reasonable prices, and frequent special sales. The larger stores sent their buyers to Denver, Minneapolis, and Chicago once or twice a year to evaluate the newest trends in merchandising and stock up on the latest fashions. By the 1920s and 1930s, large mail-order houses such as Sears, Roebuck & Co. and Montgomery Ward provided serious competition, so the department stores came to rely even more on salesmanship as well as close integration with the community.

== Natural resource development ==
=== Mining and organized labor ===
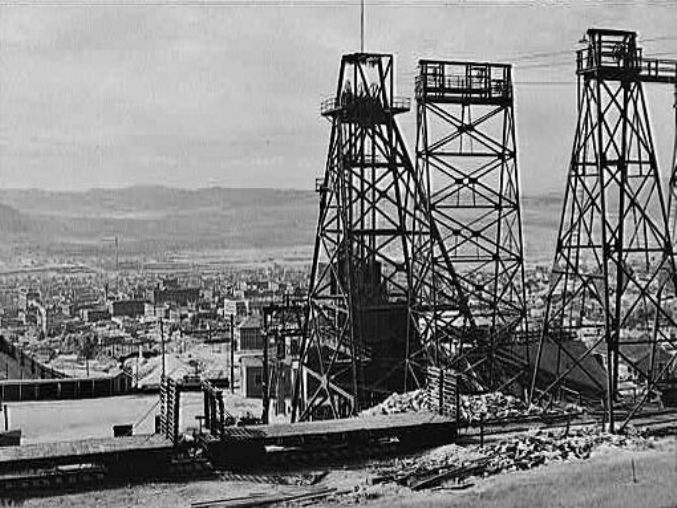
Mining headframes in Butte, MT

==== Butte ====
Copper made Butte one of the most prosperous cities in the world, due to deposits dubbed "the Richest Hill on Earth". From 1892 through 1903, the Anaconda mine in Butte was the largest copper-producing mine in the world. It produced more than $300 million worth of metal in its lifetime. The nearby city of Anaconda was the dream child of industrialist Marcus Daly (1841–1900), whose Anaconda Copper Mining Company (ACM) by 1900 employed three-quarters of Montana's wage earners; it dominated the state's politics and press into the 1950s. The smelters in Anaconda process the copper mined in Butte. From 1884 to 1934, the company fought industrial unionism; finally in 1901 workers there organized a local of the radical Western Federation of Miners (WFM). In 1916, the WFM became the International Union of Mine, Mill, and Smelter Workers (IUMMSW), one of the ten original unions of the Congress of Industrial Organizations (CIO) in the 1930s. However, the union remained weak until 1934, when members joined with miners, other smelter workers, and some craft laborers in the region in a strike that forced the company to negotiate. In the late 1940s the CIO purged unions controlled by Communists, which meant the expulsion of the IUMMSW and a bid for influence among smelter workers by the anticommunist United Steel Workers of America (USWA). In 1980, most of the copper mines and smelters were shut down, leaving a major cleanup mess for the Environmental Protection Agency.

Butte was one of the largest cities west of the Mississippi for generations. Silver Bow county (Butte and suburbs) had 24,000 people in 1890, and peaked at 60,000 in 1920. Then the population steadily declined to 34,000 in 1990 and stabilized. In its heyday between the late 19th century and about 1920, it was the largest and most notorious copper boomtowns in the American West, home to hundreds of saloons and a famous red-light district. The documentary Butte, America depicts its history as a copper producer and the issues of labor unionism, economic rise and decline, and environmental degradation that resulted from the activity.

==== Mining camps ====
Many mining camps were established in the late 19th century, some becoming established cities like Butte and Red Lodge which survived the closure of their mines. Others enjoyed a boom period then withered away, though some, such as Bannack have since become famed as "ghost towns" and have been preserved. Another example was the community of Comet, in what today is Jefferson County, where there were mines and processing mills from 1869 to 1941. At its height, Comet was a town of 12 blocks and 6 streets and by 1911 had extracted $13 million worth of metals (gold, silver, lead, zinc, and copper ore), but is now abandoned and decaying. The town's most prominent remains are the mill, office, and bunkhouse, which are leftovers from the last productive years in the 1920s and 1930s. Most of the other structures and buildings have collapsed from neglect.

==== Anaconda ====
Metals manufacturing dominated life in four Montana communities: Anaconda, Black Eagle (a suburb of Great Falls), East Helena, and Columbia Falls. The industrial workers who lived in the shadow of the smokestacks faced health hazards and job insecurity. Wives often worked to supplement the family income and after 1960, women increasingly worked outside the home. The smelters, usually the only workplace for young men who wished to remain in the community, created blue-collar towns. Residents expressed a love-hate relationship with the companies, which paid high wages for semi-skilled workers and supported community projects but were heavy-handed with the workers. Labor unions united the community workers and local business.

In 1903, the Socialist Party of America won its first victory west of the Mississippi when Anaconda, Montana, elected a socialist mayor, treasurer, police judge, and three councilmen. The Socialist Party had grown within the Montana labor movement. Initially, the Anaconda Copper Mining Company tolerated them, but when the Socialists gained political power and threatened to implement reform, particularly when a socialist mayor was also elected in Butte, the company systematically undermine the Socialists. City workers and councilmen refused to cooperate with the new mayor, and the company began to fire Socialists. In the long run labor lost ground in Anaconda and the company exerted ever greater political control.

=== Timber ===
Timber resources were critical to both mines and railroads. Western Montana had ample timber but not always along the most natural railroad routes, and timber near mines was quickly depleted. Thus huge swaths of timber resources were made available to private railroad and mining interests, usually in a checkerboard pattern of ownership interspersed with sections of publicly held land. The communities of Libby, Kalispell and Missoula rose in part due to the demand for timber and their location along strategic waterways.

=== Coal ===
Montana holds significant coal reserves and strip mining became the most economically feasible method by which to extract coal. Major coal deposits were located near the southeastern Montana settlements of Birney and Decker, and mining soon replaced cattle ranching in the immediate area. The small community of Colstrip grew substantially as it became the site for several major coal-fired power plants associated at the time with Western Energy, a subsidiary of the Montana Power Company. For residents of the region, the characteristic sense of community disappeared. The physical damage to the environment was an important factor as was the influx of miners who then outnumbered the original population. Most damaging, however, was the strife between pro- and anti-development factions in the community. Most of the inhabitants of small towns like Decker, convinced their old lifestyle had been destroyed, moved elsewhere. Residents around Birney, farther from the site of strip mining, remained divided on whether the changes had improved their quality of life.

=== Oil ===
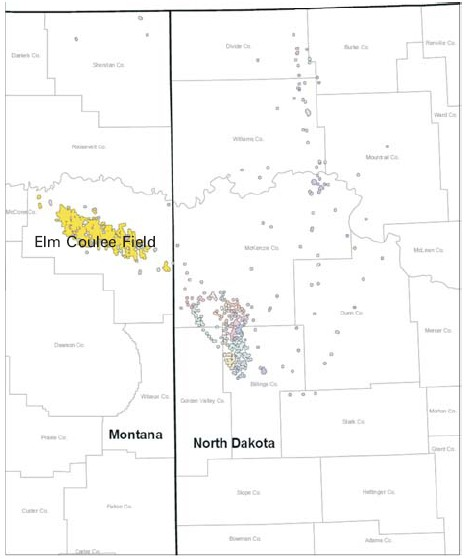
Map of Williston Basin oil fields with reservoirs in Bakken Formation

Prospectors discovered numerous small oil fields in the state after 1910. The oil went to small local refineries which marketed the gasoline locally through a network of service stations using the same brand name. After 1945 majors such as Standard Oil of New Jersey (now Exxon-Mobil) and Union Oil of California grew rapidly and by the 1950s owned 80% of refining capacity. In 1949 the value of Montana oil passed the value of copper mining. After 1945 oil production escalated in Alberta, and pipelines were built to Billings to serve the American market. The short-lived Williston Basin boom in the 1950s did not help Montana refiners because pipelines moved the oil out of state for refining. By 1960 Montana refiners depended on Canadian sources. By 2000 only four refineries remained in the state. Production, which peaked at 48 million barrels in 1968, fell by 1990 to less than 20 million, and highly efficient technology significantly reduced employment.

After the discovery of oil in the Williston Basin, Glendive became an oil boom town. The small reserves of the basin, coupled with the expense and difficulty of moving the oil out of the area, brought the end of the oil boom in Glendive in 1954. In the 1970s, new discoveries, combined with international fluctuations in the oil industry, created a second boom centered around the community of Sidney. This boom also faded.

However new drilling techniques involving horizontal drilling and fracturing technology, made it financially attractive to drill very deep new wells in the Bakken Formation of the Williston Basin. The discovery in 2000 of the extremely rich Elm Coulee Oil Field near Sidney in Richland County—with a potential for many billions of barrels of oil—and the high price of oil has created a new regional boom in the 21st century.

=== Dams and hydropower ===
The development of electrical power led to demand for electricity. The combination of Montana's abundant rivers combined with ready availability of natural resources for transporting electricity led to the building of multiple dams across the state, particularly a number on the Missouri River, most owned and operated by the Montana Power Company. The city of Great Falls, due to the presence of several existing natural cascades, became a center for hydropower development.

In 1933–43, the US Army Corps of Engineers and the Public Works Administration built the Fort Peck Dam on the Missouri River; it became the largest earthen dam in the world. The goals were to provide flood control, irrigation water, and (in a later upgrade) hydroelectric power, as well as employment for 10,000 people during the Great Depression. It cost more than $160 million.

As Chairman of the Interior and Insular Affairs Committee in the 1950s, Senator James E. Murray promoted federal development of hydroelectric power through large dams throughout the West. He secured funding for major dams in Montana at Canyon Ferry on the Missouri River, Yellowtail on the Bighorn River, Hungry Horse on the Flathead River, and Libby on the Kootenai River.

== Politics ==
Montana politics historically were noted for the tendency of Montanans to vote independently, with split ticket voting common and for races to be likely to fall to either major political party, though certain regions of the state more predictably fell into one partisan camp or the other. At times it was said that Montana "sent its liberals to Washington and its conservatives to [the state capitol] Helena". Considering its relatively brief history, the state produced a number of notable and colorful political figures, including Democrats Thomas Francis Meagher, William Andrews Clark, Thomas J. Walsh, Burton K. Wheeler, James E. Murray, and Mike Mansfield; and Republicans Jeannette Rankin and Joseph M. Dixon.

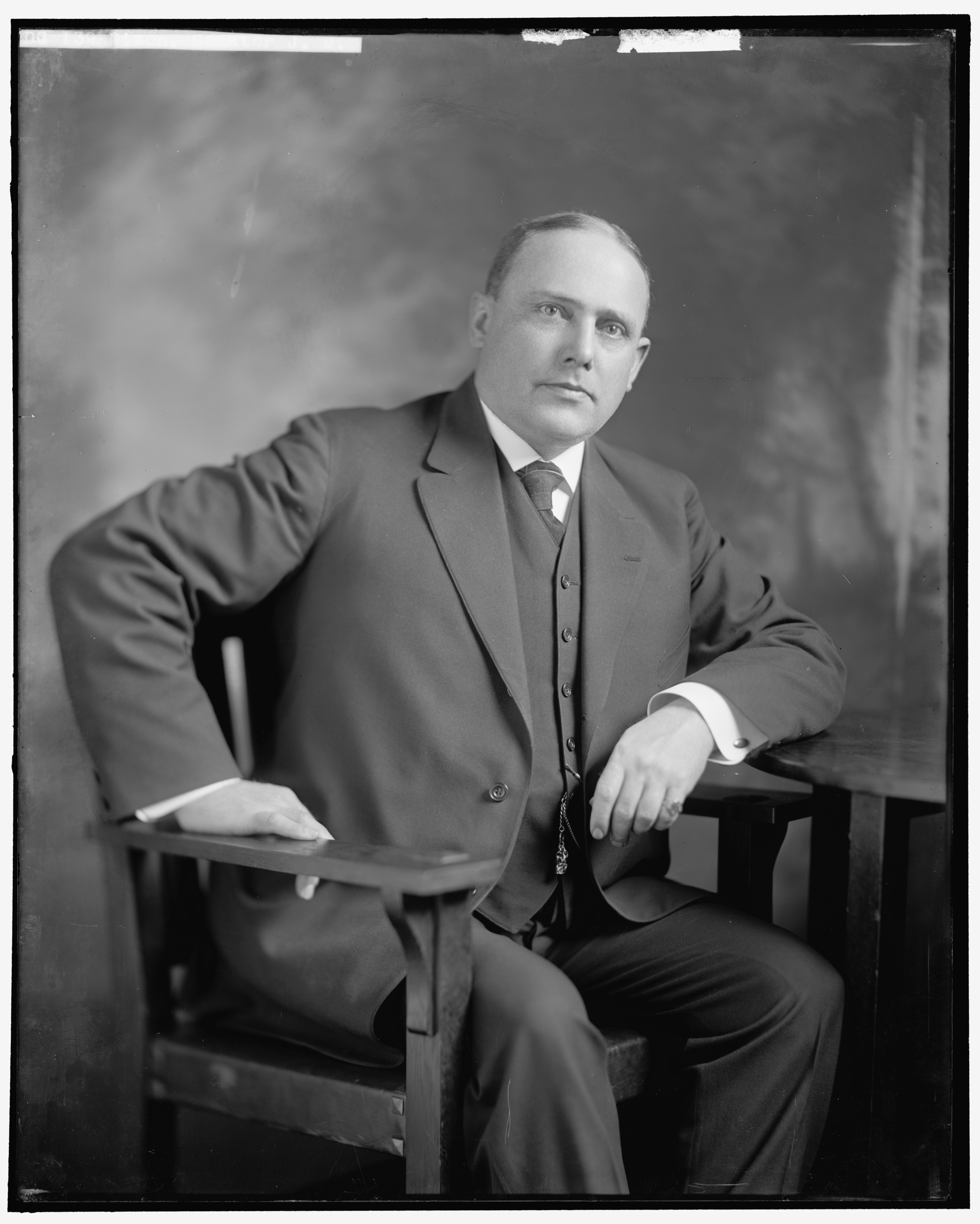
Joseph M. Dixon, Congressman (1903–1913) and Governor of Montana (1921–1925)

=== Joseph Dixon ===
Joseph M. Dixon (1867–1934), was a Republican politician from Missoula. He served as a Representative, Senator, and the seventh Governor of Montana. A businessman and a modernizer of Quaker heritage, Dixon was a leader of the Progressive Movement in Montana and nationally in 1912, serving as national campaign manager or Theodore Roosevelt's unsuccessful third term candidacy for president. His term as governor, 1921–1924, was unsuccessful, as severe economic hardship limited the opportunities to enact his proposed reforms in state government. His great enemy, the Anaconda Copper company, mobilized its resources to defeat his reelection bid in 1924.

=== Senator James Murray ===
James E. Murray (1876–1961) was born and raised in Ontario, Canada, but in 1897 after the death of his father he went to live with a wealthy uncle in Butte, who owned copper mines. Murray, an Irish Catholic, practiced law in Butte and was active in the Democratic Party, working closely with labor unions to build his liberal political base. In 1921, he inherited millions from his late uncle, dabbled in Irish politics, and reentered Montana politics when the Great Depression soured the Montana economy in the 1930s. When Senator Walsh resigned to enter Roosevelt's Cabinet in 1933, John Erickson the Democratic governor had himself appointed to the slot, despite his weak political base. Murray defeated Erickson in the 1934 primary, and was elected senator on the platform of "one hundred per-cent support" of President Roosevelt. Murray served in until 1960, becoming a powerful senior senator. Murray was a staunch liberal and aggressive supporter of the New Deal Coalition. Murray broke with the senior senator Burton K. Wheeler, also a Democrat. Wheeler led the opposition to Roosevelt's attempt to pack the Supreme Court in 1937, while Murray supported FDR. Unlike Wheeler, Murray gave up his isolationism in foreign affairs, and backed Roosevelt's aggressive foreign policy against Germany and Japan in 1939–1941. In 1938 the state's labor federations (AFL and CIO) and the Farmers Union formed the "Montana Council for Progressive Political Action" to coordinate support for New Deal liberals like Murray. They opposed the alliance between the Republicans and the conservative Democrats led by Wheeler. After the war, the conservatives controlled Congress, so Murray had little success with his proposals to expand Social Security, provide free medical care for the aged, expand federal aid to education, or create a Missouri Valley Authority with the federal control over Montana's water resources patterned after the Tennessee Valley Authority. Instead, Congress adopted the Pick-Sloan Plan with flood control by the Army Corps of Engineers, the Bureau of Reclamation, and private development.

The Murray Hotel in Livingston, Montana was financed by the Murray family and named for the senator.

== Montana since 1945 ==
=== Regional changes ===
Since the 1970s, the western third of the state has grown and attracted tourists, retirees, and up-scale part-time residents seeking spectacular mountain scenery as well as an interest in outdoor recreational activities, including hiking, hunting and fishing. Housing prices soared, but then declined sharply in the Great recession of 2008. Simultaneously the shift to a postmodern service economy has led to growth in service-oriented cities such as Billings (with medicine and the energy industry) in the eastern part of the state, and in the western half, Missoula (with higher education). Cities such as Bozeman and Kalispell saw significant growth related to tourism. Meanwhile, the populations of older mining centers such as Butte and Anaconda shrunk. After ARCO shut down the Anaconda copper operations in 1980, its former mines and smelter became the Environmental Protection Agency's second largest Superfund cleanup site.

In the late twentieth century and early twenty first century many of the small towns in eastern Montana had steadily been losing population. However, due to the Bakken oil region, towns such as Sidney are now experiencing a boom in population. As of 2012 Richland County, of which Sidney is the county seat, is the fourth fastest growing county in the nation. Billings has been growing and serves as a transportation, refining, financial and technical center for the booming oil and coal industries, as well as ranching and farming.

=== Party politics ===
For historian Michael Malone, "One of the most refreshing aspects of Montana politics is its open, breezy, grass-roots democratic atmosphere. The state's small and unpretentious population has ready access to political leaders and political power".

Though historically a swing state politically, beginning with the 1988 election, the state tended toward Republican party domination until 2004, when the election of a Democratic governor and a return of the legislature to divided party rule temporarily moved the state back into the swing status, solidified by the election of Senator Jon Tester in 2006. In the 2008 and 2010 elections, a Republican majority again gained full control of the legislature, but all five statewide offices remained in Democratic hands. When the 2012 election moved Steve Bullock, a Democrat who had been Attorney general to the office of governor, the Attorney General's office moved to Republican hands for the first time since 1992. In 2014 Governor Bullock later appointed Lieutenant Governor John Walsh to become the new senator to replace Max Baucus, the incoming Ambassador to China. Baucus had served 1979–2014, and played a major role in writing the nation's health care and tax laws. The 2014 Senate election became a contest between Walsh and Republican Congressman Steve Daines.

Current controversial political topics include a recent Montana Supreme Court decision handed down in late December 2011, Western Tradition Partnership v. Montana, The decision upholds Montana's 1912 Corrupt Practices Act, which banned direct corporate spending in state elections. It is anticipated to be appealed to the United States Supreme Court, as it directly challenges certain provisions of Citizens United v. Federal Election Commission as applied to state elections. Other major current issues include natural resource extraction activities such as the routing of the Keystone Pipeline through Montana, the use of fracking technology for fossil fuel extraction, and the development of Montana's coal resources, particularly in the Otter Creek area.

=== Environmentalism ===
Various forms of conservation and environmental concern date to the earliest years of the territory. In 1872, Yellowstone National Park, situated partially in Montana, was created. In the 1890s the efforts of George Bird Grinnell (a naturalist) and Louis W. Hill (the president of the Great Northern Railway) and others led to the creation of Glacier National Park, which was set apart by Congress in 1910. Hill was especially interested in sponsoring artists to come to the park, and he built tourist lodges that displayed their work. His hotels in the park never made a profit but they attracted thousands of visitors who came via the Great Northern.

The Civilian Conservation Corps (CCC), a New Deal agency for young men, played a major role 1933–42 in developing both Glacier National Park and Yellowstone National Park. CCC projects included reforestation, campground development, trail construction, fire hazard reduction, and fire-fighting work.

We the people of Montana grateful to God for the quiet beauty of our state, the grandeur of our mountains, the vastness of our rolling plains, and desiring to improve the quality of life, equality of opportunity and to secure the blessings of liberty for this and future generations do ordain and establish this constitution.

— Preamble, 1972 Montana Constitution

The new 1972 state constitution placed Montana in "the forefront of states concerned with preservation and environmental protection". The preamble, for example, expressed an official view of the importance of natural resources to the future of the Montana. A guarantee of a clean and healthful environment was declared an inalienable right in the Declaration of Rights, and elaborated upon further in Article IX, concerning Environmental protection and improvement. There continues to be a clash between the forces favoring business development of natural resources (especially coal, oil, gas, electricity, timber and pipeline companies), and environmentalists who put a higher priority on preservation and protection of scenery and wildlife. For example, after the age of coal mining arrived in eastern Montana in the late 1960s, the issue became use of Yellowstone River Basin's water to cool the coal-burning electricity plants planned for Colstrip. Environmentalists rallied cattle ranchers, fishing organizations and other recreational river users to oppose strip mining. These groups succeeded after intense debates in forming of organizations such as the Northern Plains Resource Council, and securing legislative enactment of Montana's Environmental Protection Act (MEPA) and the Major Facilities Siting Act.

==== Howard ====
Newspaperman and lecturer Joseph Kinsey Howard (1906–51) believed Montana and the rural West provided the "last stand against urban technological tedium" for the individual. His Montana: High, Wide and Handsome (1943) gave impetus to the environmental movement. Howard fervently believed that small towns of the sort that predominated in Montana provided a democratic bulwark for society. Howard's writings demonstrate his strong belief in the necessity to identify and preserve a region's cultural heritage. His book as numerous speeches and magazine articles, were based on his ideals of community awareness and identity, his hatred of the Anaconda Company, and called on readers to retain an idealistic vision contesting the deadening demands of the modern corporate world. The book's 27 chapters were grouped into sections on Prairie, Prophet, Prospector, Puncher, Plow, Panic, and Planning. Each chapter was written with emotionally charged prose that marked a dramatic change from the standard histories romanticizing the Old West. Howard focused on economics, arguing that Native Americans had "the perfect balance of Nature, man, and food in this grim and unforgiving land". Howard presented themes that reverberated in environmentalist thinking for over a half century, alleging that the white invaders destroyed "the natural economy of the northern Great Plains" and in return built little that lasted. Moreover, the new industrial economy, despite all its promises, could never restore the old balance of man and nature. Scholars have judged the book "heavily romantic and melodramatic" and have called many of his conclusions "simplistic", but they also argue Montana: High, Wide and Handsome "has probably affected people's thinking about Montana more than any other work".

=== Higher education ===
In 1994, in the face of declining state spending, the Montana Board of Regents of Higher Education restructured the state's public colleges and universities. It put Montana's 14 campuses in five categories: two state university systems (University of Montana and Montana State University), a community college system emphasizing technology, tribal colleges, and independent colleges not controlled by the state.

=== Medical marijuana debate ===
Medicinal marijuana has been a major political issue in recent years, according to the state's news editors at major newspapers. In 2004, Montana voters approved an initiative to legalize use of medicinal marijuana to registered users who had a doctor's prescription. By 2010, many businesses had sprung up, and certain physicians diagnosed, at times, hundreds of people a day. The number of registered users jumped from 2000 in 2009 to more than 30,000 by June 2011. The 2011 Montana Legislature attempted to repeal legalization, but their bill was vetoed by Gov. Brian Schweitzer. A compromise was reached; he signed a law prohibiting providers to charge patients for medical marijuana, limited each provider to three patients, and made it more difficult for patients to get a physician's approval to use medical marijuana.

In addition, federal drug officials made multiple raids in the state. Outlets dropped from 4,848 in March 2011 to 383 by November 2011. Court action ensued, and in the summer of 2011, a state District Court judge blocked parts of the law from taking effect. Advocates for medical marijuana sought to put a new referendum on the statewide ballot for 2012. The court case is on appeal to the Montana Supreme Court. On November 4, 2020, the Montana Supreme Court has legalized Marijuana completely.

== Bibliography ==
=== Surveys ===
- Bancroft, Hubert Howe (1890). The History of Washington, Idaho and Montana (1845–1889) Vol XXXI. San Francisco, CA: The History Company.
- Fogarty, Kate Hammond (1916). The Story of Montana. New York: A. S. Barnes Company.
- Hamilton, James McClellan. From Wilderness to Statehood: A History of Montana, 1805–1900 (Bindfords & Mort, 1957) 627pp.
- Howard, Joseph Kinsey. Montana: High, Wide, and Handsome (1943; with new forward, University of Nebraska Press, 2003)
- Malone, Michael P.; Roeder, Richard B.; Lang, William L. (1991). Montana-A History of Two Centuries. Seattle, WA: University of Washington Press. ISBN 0-295-97129-0., the standard scholarly history
- Smith, Duane A. Rocky Mountain Heartland: Colorado, Montana, and Wyoming in the 20th Century (2008) 305pp compares the interplay of tradition and modernization in the three states
- Stout, Tom. Montana, its story and biography; a history of aboriginal and territorial Montana and three decades of statehood (1921) online free vol 1; vol 1 962pp; detailed history to 1920; biographies in vol 2 and 3
- WPA Federal Writers Project. Montana: A State Guide Book (Viking Press, 1939) classic guide to history, culture and every town online free; Kindle edition

=== Local studies ===
- West, Carroll Van. Capitalism on the Frontier: Billings and the Yellowstone Valley in the Nineteenth Century (University of Nebraska Press, 1993)
- Hedges, James B. "The Colonization Work of the Northern Pacific Railroad", Mississippi Valley Historical Review Vol. 13, No. 3 (Dec. 1926), pp. 311–342
- Jensen, Vernon H. (1950). Heritage of Conflict: Labor Relations in the Nonferrous Metals Industry up to 1930. Cornell University Press – via Questia.

=== Politics ===
- Gutfield, Arnon. Montana's Agony; Years of War and Hysteria, 1917-1921 (Gainesville: University Presses of Florida, 1979). 174 pp. online
- Lemon, Greg. Blue Man in a Red State: Montana's Governor Brian Schweitzer and the New Western Populism (2008)
- Mills, David W. Cold War in a Cold Land: Fighting Communism on the Northern Plains (2015) Col War era; excerpt
- Morrison, John, and Catherine Wright Morrison, eds. Mavericks: The Lives and Battles of Montana's Political Legends (2003), chapters on Joseph K. Toole, Ella Knowles, Joseph M. Dixon, Thomas Walsh, Jeannette Rankin, Burton K. Wheeler, James E. Murray, Mike Mansfield, and Lee Metcalf
- O'Keane, Josephine (1955). Thomas J. Walsh: A Senator from Montana – via Questia.
- Spritzer, Donald F. Senator James E. Murray and the Limits of Post-War Liberalism (1985).
- Swibold, Dennis L. Copper chorus: mining, politics, and the Montana press, 1889–1959 (2006)
- Waldron, Ellis L. Montana politics since 1864: an atlas of elections (1958) 428 pages

== See also ==
- Bibliography of Montana history
  - Bibliography of Glacier National Park (U.S.)
- Outline of Montana
- List of people in Montana history
- Montana in the American Civil War
- Timeline of Montana history
  - Timeline of pre-statehood Montana history
