= National Register of Historic Places listings in Stillwater County, Montana =

Location of Stillwater County in Montana

This is a list of the National Register of Historic Places listings in Stillwater County, Montana. It is intended to be a complete list of the properties and districts on the National Register of Historic Places in Stillwater County, Montana, United States. The locations of National Register properties and districts for which the latitude and longitude coordinates are included below, may be seen in a map.

There are 15 properties and districts listed on the National Register in the county.

This National Park Service list is complete through NPS recent listings posted September 25, 2026.

== Listings county-wide ==
	Name on the Register	Image	Date listed	Location	City or town	Description
1	4K Ranch		February 14, 2002 (#02000049)	Fiddler Creek Rd. 45°22′48″N 109°41′45″W	Dean	
2	Atlas Block	Atlas Block	August 24, 2011 (#11000588)	523 & 528 E. Pike Ave. 45°38′13″N 109°15′11″W	Columbus	
3	Dean School	Dean School	December 2, 2019 (#100004713)	1367 Nye Rd. 45°24′16″N 109°41′24″W	Dean	One-room schoolhouse
4	Halfway House	Halfway House	February 21, 2002 (#02000047)	3951 Montana Highway 78; 45°34′08″N 109°19′57″W	Columbus	
5	Oliver H. Hovda House	Oliver H. Hovda House	August 16, 1984 (#84002506)	N. Woodward St. 45°31′19″N 109°26′23″W	Absarokee	
6	Michael Jacobs House	Michael Jacobs House	January 28, 1987 (#86003676)	4 W. 1st Ave., N. 45°38′24″N 109°15′33″W	Columbus	
7	Meyers Creek Work Center	Meyers Creek Work Center	April 14, 2023 (#100008876)	101-199 Meyers Creek Rd, Custer Gallatin NF; 45°29′24″N 109°54′45″W	Nye vicinity	
8	Mountain View Cemetery	Mountain View Cemetery	July 16, 1987 (#87001200)	U.S. Route 10 and Rapelje Rd. 45°38′31″N 109°16′22″W	Columbus	
9	W.H. Norton House	W.H. Norton House	October 25, 1982 (#82000597)	3rd Ave. 45°38′27″N 109°15′11″W	Columbus	
10	Charles and Gladys Pelton House	Charles and Gladys Pelton House	April 24, 2017 (#100000916)	303 W. Rosebud Rd. 45°24′30″N 109°31′32″W	Fishtail	
11	Sandstone and Cobblestone Schools	Sandstone and Cobblestone Schools	January 15, 1987 (#86002949)	142 S. Woodard Ave. 45°30′37″N 109°26′45″W	Absarokee	
12	Stillwater County Courthouse	Stillwater County Courthouse	August 14, 2019 (#100004277)	400 East 3rd Ave. North; 45°38′25″N 109°15′14″W	Columbus	
13	Stoltz House	Stoltz House	April 16, 1991 (#91000422)	405 SW. 1st St. 45°37′45″N 108°54′44″W	Park City	
14	Torgrimson Place	Torgrimson Place	August 31, 2001 (#01000921)	W. Rosebud Rd. 45°23′39″N 109°32′52″W	Fishtail	
15	United Methodist Episcopal Church	United Methodist Episcopal Church	July 26, 2010 (#10000497)	Southeast corner of Clark St. and Second Ave. 45°37′50″N 108°54′54″W	Park City	

== See also ==
- List of National Historic Landmarks in Montana
- National Register of Historic Places listings in Montana
