= Sandstone and Cobblestone Schools =

- U.S. National Register of Historic Places
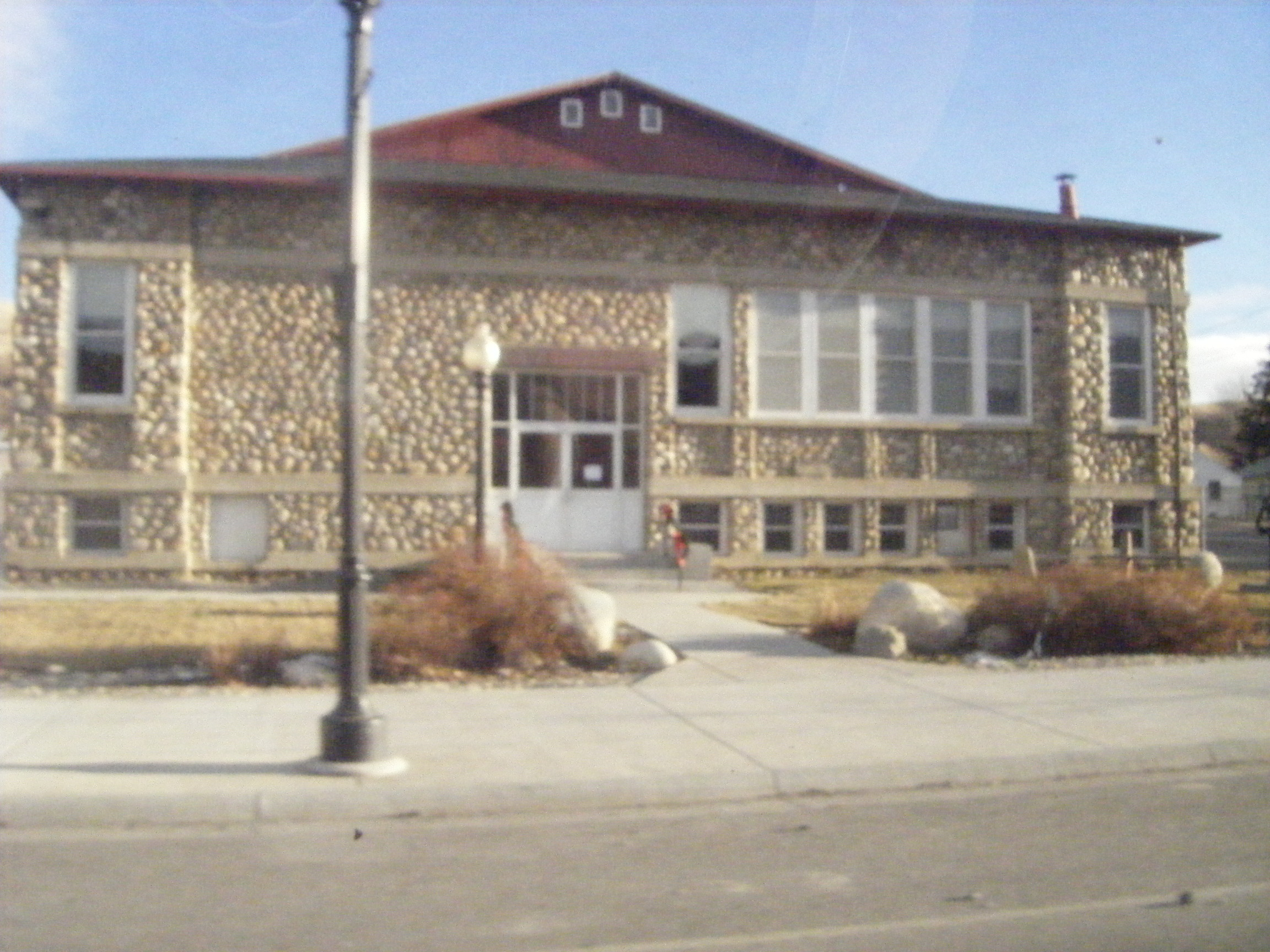

- Location within Montana Location within the United States
- Location: Main St., Absarokee, Montana
- Coordinates: 45°30′37″N 109°26′45″W
- Area: less than one acre
- Built: 1910, 1915, 1921
- Architect: Rosner, Dominick; Plew, W.R.
- NRHP reference No.: 86002949
- Added to NRHP: January 15, 1987

The Sandstone and Cobblestone Schools, a complex of two school buildings in Absarokee, Montana, on Main St. and at 142 S. Woodard Ave., dates from 1910 to 1921. The complex was listed on the National Register of Historic Places in 1987.

It includes the Sandstone School, built in 1910 as a one-story two-classroom hip roofed building with rusticated coursing of stones, to serve primary students from grades one through eight in School District 52. This was expanded in 1915 to also serve as a high school for the small number of high school students in the district, and has four 25 feet (7.6 m) classrooms.

The second building, the Cobblestone School, is also one-story and is about 70 by 79 feet (21 m × 24 m) in plan. It was built in 1921 to serve as a new high school to serve the combination of School District 52 and School District 21, covering the southern part of Stillwater County, including from Limestone and Nye, as far as 45 miles (72 km) away. The students from far away boarded with families in Absarokee during the winter. During 1920 to 1940, about 50 to 70 students attended high school each year.

Dominick Rosner was architect of the 1915 addition. W.R. Plew was architect of the 1921 work.
