= Mystic Lake =

Mystic Lake can refer to:

- Mystic Lake (California)
- Mystic Lakes (Boston, Massachusetts), a series of lakes in Boston
- Mystic Lake (Washington), in Mount Rainier National Park
- Mystic Lake (Marstons Mills), in Marstons Mills, Massachusetts
- Mystic Lake (Beaverhead County, Montana) in Beaverhead County, Montana
- Mystic Lake (Gallatin County, Montana) in Gallatin County, Montana
- Mystic Lake (Stillwater County, Montana) in Stillwater County, Montana
- Mystic Lake Casino, a casino on the Shakopee-Mdewakanton Indian Reservation near Shakopee and Prior Lake, Minnesota
