= Columbus Airport =

Columbus Airport may refer to:

Airports with commercial airline service:

- John Glenn Columbus International Airport in Columbus, Ohio, United States (FAA/IATA: CMH)
- Rickenbacker International Airport in Columbus, Ohio, United States (FAA/IATA: LCK)
- Columbus Airport (Georgia) in Columbus, Georgia, United States (FAA/IATA: CSG)
- Golden Triangle Regional Airport near Columbus, Mississippi, United States (FAA/IATA: GTR)

Other airports:

- Woltermann Memorial Airport, formerly known as Columbus Airport, in Columbus, Montana, United States (FAA: 6S3)
- Columbus-Lowndes County Airport, a public use airport in Columbus, Mississippi, United States (FAA/IATA: UBS)
- Columbus Southwest Airport in Columbus, Ohio, United States (FAA: 04I)

== See also ==
- Columbus Municipal Airport (disambiguation)
