= List of lakes of Stillwater County, Montana =

There are at least 80 named lakes and reservoirs in Stillwater County, Montana.

== Lakes ==
- Arapooash Lake, 45°14′47″N 109°50′52″W, el. 9,672 feet (2,948 m)
- Asteroid Lake, 45°16′18″N 110°00′55″W, el. 9,465 feet (2,885 m)
- Aufwuchs Lake, 45°12′58″N 110°02′49″W, el. 8,891 feet (2,710 m)
- Avalanche Lake, 45°10′55″N 109°48′38″W, el. 9,747 feet (2,971 m)
- Barrier Lake, 45°15′04″N 110°03′14″W, el. 8,310 feet (2,530 m)
- Beckwourth Lake, 45°12′42″N 109°53′43″W, el. 9,226 feet (2,812 m)
- Big Foot Lake, 45°10′48″N 109°52′47″W, el. 10,190 feet (3,110 m)
- Big Lake, 45°53′02″N 109°03′08″W, el. 3,930 feet (1,200 m)
- Bill Lake, 45°17′46″N 110°00′14″W, el. 8,441 feet (2,573 m)
- Blueball Lake, 45°30′34″N 109°38′19″W, el. 4,426 feet (1,349 m)
- Brent Lake, 45°10′27″N 109°45′21″W, el. 10,193 feet (3,107 m)
- Brown Lake, 45°12′28″N 109°52′28″W, el. 8,911 feet (2,716 m)
- Cataract Lake, 45°16′48″N 109°53′49″W, el. 8,753 feet (2,668 m)
- Chalice Lake, 45°18′53″N 110°03′58″W, el. 9,626 feet (2,934 m)
- Chrome Lake, 45°21′02″N 109°47′48″W, el. 8,468 feet (2,581 m)
- Cimmerian Lake, 45°17′44″N 110°01′40″W, el. 8,635 feet (2,632 m)
- Clam Lake, 45°15′58″N 110°03′54″W, el. 9,924 feet (3,025 m)
- Cold Lake, 45°11′34″N 109°48′31″W, el. 9,632 feet (2,936 m)
- Comet Lake, 45°16′31″N 110°00′45″W, el. 9,360 feet (2,850 m)
- Corkscrew Lake, 45°11′50″N 109°57′18″W, el. 8,258 feet (2,517 m)
- Crater Lake, 45°18′53″N 109°38′53″W, el. 6,565 feet (2,001 m)
- Dallmann Lake, 45°57′54″N 109°14′07″W, el. 3,996 feet (1,218 m)
- Dreary Lake, 45°16′43″N 110°03′46″W, el. 9,065 feet (2,763 m)
- Dry Lake, 45°55′40″N 109°06′20″W, el. 3,944 feet (1,202 m)
- Dryad Lake, 45°17′06″N 110°01′31″W, el. 9,144 feet (2,787 m)
- Eedica Lake, 45°11′24″N 109°53′57″W, el. 9,711 feet (2,960 m)
- Emerald Lake, 45°15′23″N 109°41′42″W, el. 6,316 feet (1,925 m)
- Frenco Lake, 45°12′48″N 109°53′03″W, el. 9,150 feet (2,790 m)
- Froze-to-Death Lake, 45°10′49″N 109°44′41″W, el. 10,154 feet (3,095 m)
- Halfbreed Lake, 45°57′31″N 109°07′01″W, el. 3,937 feet (1,200 m)
- Heart Lake, 45°22′36″N 109°42′51″W, el. 6,119 feet (1,865 m)
- Hermit Lake, 45°16′07″N 110°01′24″W, el. 10,033 feet (3,058 m)
- Horseman Flats Lake, 45°24′59″N 109°52′22″W, el. 5,472 feet (1,668 m)
- Hunter Lake, 45°50′06″N 109°02′40″W, el. 3,999 feet (1,219 m)
- Island Lake, 45°22′38″N 109°42′38″W, el. 6,033 feet (1,839 m)
- Island Lake, 45°13′17″N 109°49′13″W, el. 7,730 feet (2,360 m)
- Jasper Lake, 45°20′46″N 110°02′28″W, el. 9,176 feet (2,797 m)
- Jawbone Lake, 45°15′27″N 109°45′41″W, el. 9,885 feet (3,013 m)
- Jay Lake, 45°18′23″N 110°04′02″W, el. 9,819 feet (2,993 m)
- Kid Lake, 45°10′22″N 109°52′28″W, el. 9,472 feet (2,887 m)
- Lake Diaphanous, 45°17′03″N 110°05′12″W, el. 9,609 feet (2,929 m)
- Lake Pisce, 45°16′32″N 110°01′42″W, el. 9,783 feet (2,982 m)
- Lake Surrender, 45°17′45″N 110°02′13″W, el. 8,648 feet (2,636 m)
- Lake Turgulse, 45°10′33″N 109°45′35″W, el. 10,197 feet (3,108 m)
- Lake Vengence, 45°16′08″N 110°01′12″W, el. 9,957 feet (3,035 m)
- Lake Wildness, 45°16′48″N 109°50′31″W, el. 9,429 feet (2,874 m)
- Lily Pad Lake, 45°18′40″N 109°38′26″W, el. 6,381 feet (1,945 m)
- Little Arch Lake, 45°10′26″N 109°43′41″W, el. 10,098 feet (3,078 m)
- Little Face Lake, 45°14′43″N 109°51′16″W, el. 9,993 feet (3,046 m)
- Lost Lake, 45°21′08″N 109°43′17″W, el. 6,663 feet (2,031 m)
- Memidgi Lake, 45°13′39″N 109°52′18″W, el. 9,616 feet (2,931 m)
- Mountain View Lake, 45°23′14″N 109°54′09″W, el. 6,745 feet (2,056 m)
- Needle Lake, 45°16′50″N 110°01′24″W, el. 9,268 feet (2,825 m)
- Nightmare Lake, 45°18′21″N 109°52′57″W, el. 9,140 feet (2,790 m)
- Nugget Lake, 45°12′25″N 109°53′50″W, el. 9,311 feet (2,838 m)
- Phantom Lake, 45°11′43″N 109°43′38″W, el. 9,314 feet (2,839 m)
- Princess Lake, 45°11′52″N 109°48′48″W, el. 9,078 feet (2,767 m)
- Ram Lake, 45°16′10″N 109°45′58″W, el. 9,554 feet (2,912 m)
- Ravin Lake, 45°17′17″N 110°03′16″W, el. 8,940 feet (2,720 m)
- Reeves Lake, 45°17′31″N 109°37′39″W, el. 5,958 feet (1,816 m)
- Roosevelt Lake, 45°15′04″N 109°58′26″W, el. 6,342 feet (1,933 m)
- Saderbalm Lake, 45°20′34″N 110°01′03″W, el. 9,016 feet (2,748 m)
- Sienna Lake, 45°15′36″N 109°59′58″W, el. 9,255 feet (2,821 m)
- Silver Lake, 45°12′30″N 109°51′22″W, el. 7,828 feet (2,386 m)
- Sioux Charley Lake, 45°19′48″N 109°56′02″W, el. 5,669 feet (1,728 m)
- Snowball Lakes, 45°11′26″N 109°49′17″W, el. 9,665 feet (2,946 m)
- Storm Lakes, 45°10′33″N 109°49′28″W, el. 10,430 feet (3,180 m)
- Trouble Lake, 45°16′08″N 110°03′28″W, el. 9,396 feet (2,864 m)
- Turco Pond, 45°26′10″N 109°46′22″W, el. 4,842 feet (1,476 m)
- Twin Lakes, 45°22′26″N 109°42′43″W, el. 6,079 feet (1,853 m)
- Upper Corkscrew Lake, 45°11′16″N 109°57′14″W, el. 9,190 feet (2,800 m)
- Weeluna Lake, 45°14′02″N 109°52′12″W, el. 9,721 feet (2,963 m)
- West Fishtail Creek Lakes, 45°17′43″N 109°48′23″W, el. 9,708 feet (2,959 m)
- West Rosebud Lake, 45°15′04″N 109°42′35″W, el. 6,384 feet (1,946 m)
- Wildcat Lakes, 45°11′39″N 110°00′58″W, el. 8,901 feet (2,713 m)
- Wood Lake, 45°16′31″N 109°50′05″W, el. 9,619 feet (2,932 m)
- Woodbine Lake, 45°17′59″N 109°52′36″W, el. 9,058 feet (2,761 m)
- Zoeteman Lake, 45°24′47″N 109°51′44″W, el. 5,043 feet (1,537 m)

== Reservoirs ==
- Hailstone Lake, 46°00′00″N 109°10′45″W, el. 4,009 feet (1,222 m)
- Mystic Lake, 45°13′32″N 109°45′38″W, el. 7,677 feet (2,340 m)

== See also ==
- List of lakes in Montana
