= Charles M. Russell National Wildlife Refuge Complex =

Six Wildlife Refuges in Montana, U.S.

Charles M. Russell National Wildlife Refuge Complex consists of six National Wildlife Refuges, all of them managed by the U.S. Fish and Wildlife Service. The refuges are located in the central sections of the U.S. state of Montana. The complex includes the following areas:

- Charles M. Russell National Wildlife Refuge (headquarters for the complex)
- Grass Lake National Wildlife Refuge (formerly Halfbreed Lake NWR)
- Hailstone National Wildlife Refuge
- Lake Mason National Wildlife Refuge
- War Horse National Wildlife Refuge
- UL Bend National Wildlife Refuge
