= Halfway House (Columbus, Montana) =

Historic house in Montana, United States

- U.S. National Register of Historic Places
- Location within Montana Location within the United States
- Location: 3951 MT 78, near Columbus, Montana
- Coordinates: 45°34′8″N 109°19′57″W
- Area: 1 acre (0.40 ha)
- Built: 1907
- Architect: Sale, Earnest
- Architectural style: American Four-Square
- NRHP reference No.: 02000047
- Added to NRHP: February 21, 2002

The Halfway House at 3951 Montana Highway 78 near Columbus, Montana is an American Four-Square house built in 1907. It was listed on the National Register of Historic Places in 2002.

The property included three contributing buildings and one other contributing element, an irrigation ditch.

Its name is derived from the fact that it is midway between Columbus and Absarokee, Montana.
