= Beehive, Montana =

- Unincorporated community
- Location within Montana Location within the United States
- Coordinates: 45°28′45″N 109°43′15″W
- Country: United States
- State: Montana
- County: Stillwater
- Elevation: 4,629 ft (1,411 m)

Population (2010)
  - Total: 32
- Time zone: UTC-7 (Mountain (MST))
  - Summer (DST): UTC-6 (MDT)
- ZIP code: 59001
- Area code: 406
- GNIS feature ID: 802020

Beehive is an unincorporated community located in Stillwater County, Montana, United States, which shares the ZIP code with Absarokee of 59001.

== History ==
Beehive was established as a town in a deep valley along the Stillwater River, west of Absarokee. Beehive had a post office from 1910 to 1953. The community is still a getaway destination with many seasonal mountain homes.
