= Grass Lake National Wildlife Refuge =

- IUCN category IV (habitat/species management area)
- Location within the United States
- Location: Stillwater County, Montana, USA
- Nearest city: Billings, MT
- Coordinates: 45°56′39″N 109°06′42″W
- Area: 4,318 acres (1,747 ha)
- Established: 1987
- Governing body: U.S. Fish and Wildlife Service
- Website: Grass Lake National Wildlife Refuge

Grass Lake National Wildlife Refuge (formerly Halfbreed Lake National Wildlife Refuge) is in the central section of the U.S. state of Montana and is an integral part of the Charles M. Russell National Wildlife Refuge Complex, managed from the Charles M. Russell National Wildlife Refuge. This refuge provides nesting habitat for migratory bird species.
