= Springtime, Montana =

Unincorporated community in Montana, U.S.

Coordinates: 45°41′54″N 109°23′15″W

Springtime is an unincorporated community located in Stillwater County, Montana, United States.

The elevation is 3,665 feet. Springtime appears on the Springtime U.S. Geological Survey Map.

== History ==
Springtime was an agricultural community in Stillwater County. Springtime is accessed from Exit 400 off Interstate 90, west of Columbus. Sited along the former Northern Pacific line (now Montana Rail Link), Springtime had a post office from 1916 to 1932. A few agricultural buildings are all that remain of Springtime today.
