= Columbus Municipal Airport =

Columbus Municipal Airport may refer to:

all in the United States

- Columbus Municipal Airport (Indiana) in Columbus, Indiana (FAA: BAK, IATA: CLU)
- Columbus Municipal Airport (Georgia) a former airport south of downtown Columbus, Georgia (FAA: CCG); see Columbus, Georgia#Aviation
- Columbus Municipal Airport (New Mexico) in Columbus, New Mexico (FAA: 0NM0, IATA: CUS)
- Columbus Municipal Airport (Nebraska) in Columbus, Nebraska (FAA/IATA: OLU)
- Columbus Municipal Airport (North Dakota) in Columbus, North Dakota (FAA: D49)
- Columbus County Municipal Airport in Columbus County, North Carolina (FAA: CPC)

== See also ==
- Columbus Airport (disambiguation)
- Columbus Metropolitan Airport, a former name of Columbus Airport (Georgia) in Columbus, Georgia (FAA/IATA: CSG)
