= Lake Mason National Wildlife Refuge =

- IUCN category IV (habitat/species management area)
- Location within the United States
- Location: Musselshell County, Montana, United States
- Nearest city: Billings, MT
- Coordinates: 46°43′55″N 108°47′31″W
- Area: 16,814 acres (6,804 ha)
- Governing body: U.S. Fish and Wildlife Service
- Website: Lake Mason National Wildlife Refuge

Lake Mason National Wildlife Refuge is located in the center of the U.S. state of Montana. The refuge has numerous lakes and extensive marshlands along Willow Creek, which provide nesting habitat for over a hundred bird species. The refuge is managed from the Charles M. Russell National Wildlife Refuge and is normally unstaffed and has few visitor improvements. The refuge consists of three discontinuous areas; the Lake Mason area which has seasonal wetlands, the North section consisting primarily of uplands and the Willow Creek section which was set aside to protect habitat for the mountain plover.

Animals that roam in this refuge include red-tailed hawk, raccoon, coyote, ferruginous hawk, beaver, Canada goose, ring-necked pheasant, red fox, northern harrier, porcupine, bald eagle, rough-legged hawk, long-tailed weasel, short-eared owl, golden eagle, mink, burrowing owl, mallard, muskrat, and badger.
