= War Horse National Wildlife Refuge =

Wildlife refuge in Montana, USA

- IUCN category IV (habitat/species management area)
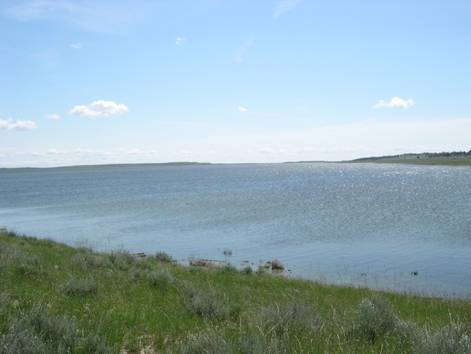
- War Horse Lake

- Location within the United States
- Location: Petroleum County, Montana, United States
- Nearest city: Winnett, MT
- Coordinates: 46°53′34″N 108°29′18″W
- Area: 3,392 acres (1,373 ha)
- Established: 1958
- Governing body: U.S. Fish and Wildlife Service
- Website: War Horse National Wildlife Refuge

War Horse National Wildlife Refuge, located in the center of the U.S. state of Montana, is divided into three separate sections, with each centered on a small body of water. It is an integral part of the Charles M. Russell National Wildlife Refuge Complex, although the refuge is normally unstaffed and has few visitor improvements. One reservoir is stocked with rainbow trout, although the lake is sometimes empty. When the lakes and reservoirs are fully filled, the refuge provides excellent habitat for migratory bird species. The region is surrounded by sagebrush plains and Ponderosa pine groves that flourish in the region solely due to its acid-shale soils. Along with over 100 bird species, regular inhabitants include Sage Grouse, pronghorn and mule deer.

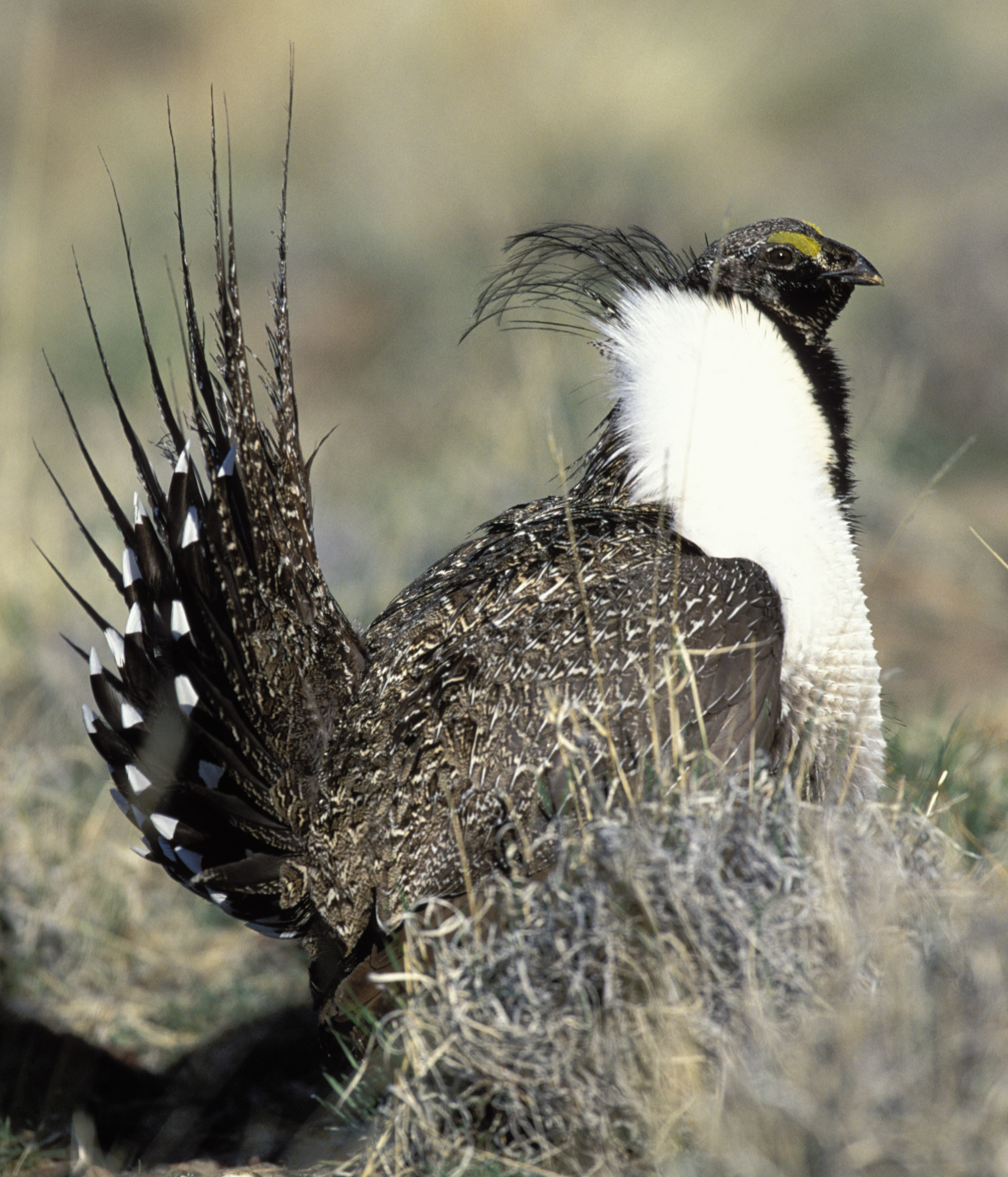
Sage Grouse
