= Oliver H. Hovda House =

Historic house in Montana, United States

- U.S. National Register of Historic Places
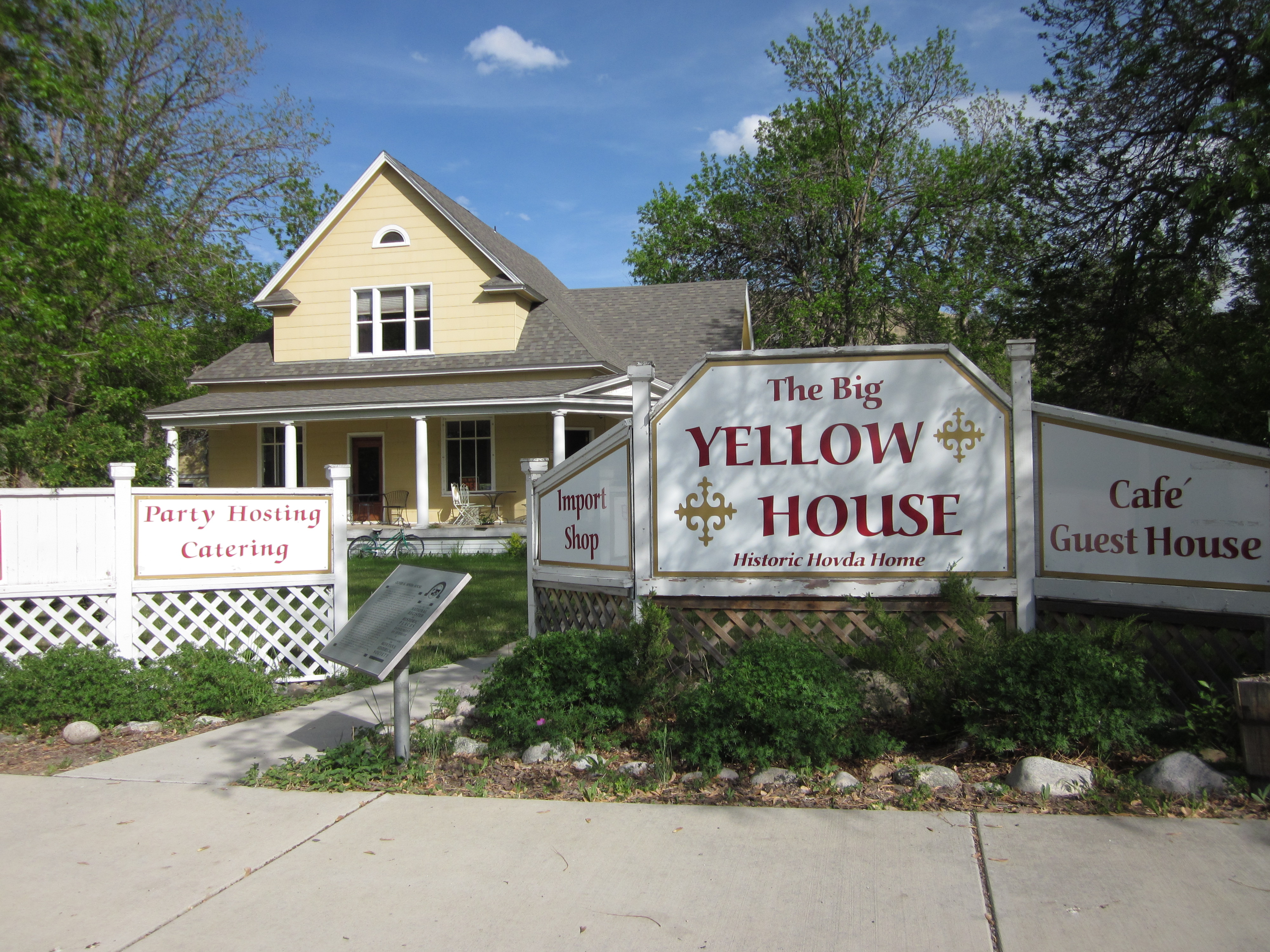

- Location within Montana Location within the United States
- Location: N. Woodward St., Absarokee, Montana
- Coordinates: 45°31′19″N 109°26′23″W
- Area: 0.5 acres (0.20 ha)
- Built: 1900
- Built by: Hovda, Oliver H.; Wagner, Jacob K.
- Architectural style: Classical Revival
- NRHP reference No.: 84002506
- Added to NRHP: August 16, 1984

The Oliver H. Hovda House, also known as Hovda House, is a historic Classical Revival style house on N. Woodward St. in Absarokee, Montana that was built in 1900. It was listed on the National Register of Historic Places in 1984.

It was built by carpenter Jacob Wagner for Oliver Hovda, young businessman and postmaster of Absarokee, which had been founded in an area of Crow Indian reservation that was opened to settlement in 1892. The house is a "well-built, beautifully proportioned residence [that] reflects the taste of its day, combining the irregular roofline associated with the Queen Anne style and neo-classical details: Doric column porch supports, a fantail window in the gable end, and a pediment accenting the main entryway. Leaded glass windows, oak trim, maple flooring, and elegantly carved doors grace the interior." The Hovdas lived there from 1904 but had moved away by 1910; it was purchased by Hovda's nephew Elmen Torgrimsen who lived there with his family from 1928 to 1950.

It is known as the Big Yellow House and is the most prominent historic house on Absarokee's main avenue, Woodward St. In 2013 it is operated much like a bed & breakfast, with rooms and a cottage available for rent.
