= Woltermann Memorial Airport =

- IATA: none; ICAO: none; FAA LID: 6S3

Summary
- Airport type: Public
- Owner: City of Columbus & Stillwater County
- Serves: Columbus, Montana
- Elevation AMSL: 3,578 ft / 1,091 m
- Coordinates: 45°37′50″N 109°14′21″W

Map
- Location of airport in Montana

Runways
| Direction | Length | | Surface |
| Direction | ft | m | Surface |
|---|---|---|---|
| 10/28 | 3,800 | 1,158 | Asphalt |

Statistics (2022)
- Aircraft operations (year ending 5/17/2022): 6,030
- Based aircraft: 27
- Source: Federal Aviation Administration

Woltermann Memorial Airport (FAA LID: 6S3) is a public use airport located southeast of Columbus, a city in Stillwater County, Montana, United States. Owned by the city and county, it was formerly known as Columbus Airport.

This airport is included in the National Plan of Integrated Airport Systems for 2011–2015, which categorized it as a general aviation facility.

== Facilities and aircraft ==
Woltermann Memorial Airport covers an area of 128 acres (52 ha) at an elevation of 3,578 feet (1,091 m) above mean sea level. It has one runway designated 10/28 with an asphalt surface measuring 3,800 by 75 feet (1,158 x 23 m).

For the 12-month period ending May 17, 2022, the airport had 6,030 aircraft operations, an average of 116 per week: 99% general aviation, <1% air taxi, and <1% military. At that time there were 27 aircraft based at this airport: all single-engine.

== See also ==
- List of airports in Montana
