= Dean School =

- U.S. National Register of Historic Places
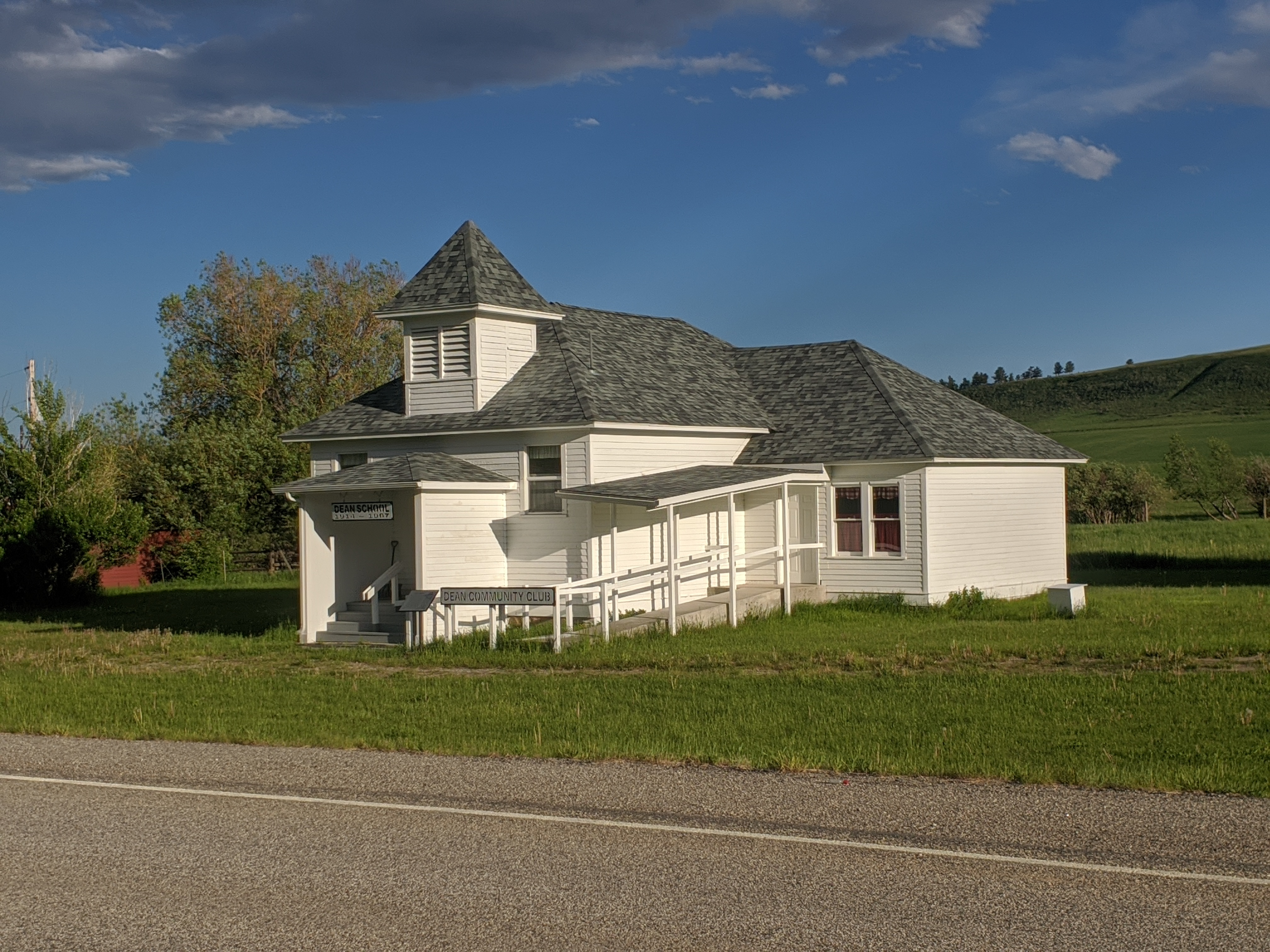

- Location within Montana Location within the United States
- Location: 1367 Nye Rd., Dean, Montana
- Coordinates: 45.404324°N 109.689942°W
- NRHP reference No.: 100004713
- Added to NRHP: December 2, 2019

Dean School was listed on the National Register of Historic Places in 2019.

It is a one-room schoolhouse.

In 2014, Montana still had about 60 one-room schoolhouses in use.
