= Hailstone National Wildlife Refuge =

Protected area in Montana, United States

- IUCN category IV (habitat/species management area)
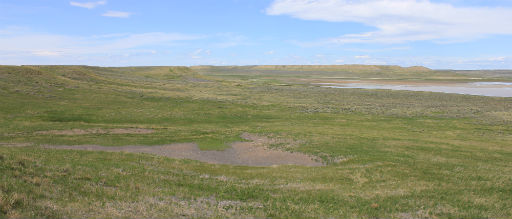

- Location within the United States
- Location: Stillwater County, Montana, USA
- Nearest city: Billings, MT
- Coordinates: 46°01′11″N 109°10′26″W
- Area: 2,700 acres (1,100 ha)
- Governing body: U.S. Fish and Wildlife Service
- Website: Hailstone National Wildlife Refuge

Hailstone National Wildlife Refuge is a National Wildlife Refuge of the United States located in central Montana.

Hailstone National Wildlife Refuge is one of several satellite refuges in the region that are part of the Charles M. Russell National Wildlife Refuge Complex. Satellite refuges are established by executive order and are unstaffed.

Hailstone was initially established as an easement refuge in 1942 to provide a rest stop and breeding ground for migratory waterfowl. The United States Fish and Wildlife Service purchased the land in 1980. The refuge is located next to Hailstone Lake, a natural basin that was enhanced to 300 acres in the 1930s under the Works Project Administration. An earthen dam was erected on this natural wetland that increased its size and turned it into a reservoir. Over the years heavy metals and salts accumulated in the reservoir and surrounding soil due to natural evaporation. In 2011 the dam was removed to restore flow to the contaminated waterway.

Greasewoods grow in the saline soils. Soils with lower salinity host native grasses. Wildlife on the refuge includes waterfowl, pronghorn, prairie dogs, horned lizards, and snakes.

Recreational activities on the refuge include hunting of big game and birds and wildlife observation.

Hailstone National Wildlife Refuge is managed by refuge staff in Lewistown, Montana.
