= Aufwuchs Lake =

- Location within Montana Location within the United States
- Location: Stillwater County, Montana
- Coordinates: 45°12′58″N 110°02′49″W
- Type: lake
- Basin countries: United States
- Surface elevation: 8,890 ft (2,710 m)

Aufwuchs Lake is a lake in Stillwater County, Montana, in the United States.

The name Aufwuchs Lake, derived from the German loan word Aufwuchs, refers to the lake's ecology.

== See also ==
- List of lakes in Montana
