= UL Bend National Wildlife Refuge =

Protected area in Montana, United States

- IUCN category IV (habitat/species management area)
- Location within the United States
- Location: Phillips County, Montana, USA
- Nearest city: Great Falls, MT
- Coordinates: 47.60000°N 107.91667°W
- Area: 56,048 acres (22,682 ha)
- Governing body: U.S. Fish and Wildlife Service
- Website: UL Bend National Wildlife Refuge

UL Bend National Wildlife Refuge is a 56,048 acres (22,682 ha) protected area that is located in central Montana, United States. The refuge, located at the extreme southernmost tip of Phillips County, is managed and bordered on three sides by the Charles M. Russell National Wildlife Refuge and the Fort Peck Reservoir on the Missouri River. The refuge is managed as part of the Charles M. Russell National Wildlife Refuge Complex by the U.S. Fish and Wildlife Service.

The UL Bend Wilderness comprises almost half the refuge (20,819 acres (84 km^{2})) and provides a high level of protection to the most remote regions. There are no maintained trails in the wilderness area and the only access is either on foot or horseback. The Upper Missouri Breaks National Monument is located immediately west of the wilderness. Broken into three sections, the largest portion of the wilderness is characterized by steep sided cliffs of the Missouri River "Breaks" country.

The Lewis and Clark Expedition passed through this region and wrote extensively on the abundance of wildlife and the ruggedness of the countryside.

== Fauna ==
Along the riverbanks, cottonwood trees flourish and are home to a wide diversity of wildlife. A large species population of red fox, bald eagle, bighorn sheep, golden eagle, black bear, great horned owl, moose, burrowing owl, coyote, elk, swift fox, bobcat, pronghorn, mule deer, and cougar inhabit this refuge. Prairie dogs are abundant and are the primary food source for the black-footed ferret, which is listed as an endangered species.

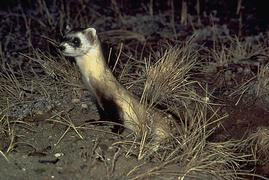
Black-footed ferret

The black-footed ferret has been reintroduced into the refuge in the 1990s after nearing extinction; the sustainability of this relocated species is not yet known, and there are only 1,000 remaining in breeding compounds and perhaps 100 in the wild. Researchers in 2002 were only able to locate a total of 5 ferrets in the entire refuge.

A proposal for the reintroduction of bison was submitted in 2020.

== Access ==
This refuge is remote, requiring travel by gravel and dirt roads that can be difficult to navigate during inclement weather.
