= Reeves Lake =

- Location within Florida
- Location: southeast side of Winter Haven, Florida
- Coordinates: 27.9567°N 81.6651°W
- Type: natural freshwater lake
- Basin countries: United States
- Max. length: 820 feet (250 m)
- Max. width: 720 feet (220 m)
- Surface area: 27.15 acres (11 ha)
- Surface elevation: 125 feet (38 m)

Reeves Lake is an oval shaped lake with a 27.15-acre (109,900 m^{2}) surface area. Reeves Lake southeast side of Winter Haven, Florida, is completely within the city limits. It is in a suburban area with residential areas bordering the lake on the northwest and eastern shores. Swampland borders much of the rest of the shore. On the southwest is a house surrounded by much land.

Reeves Lake has no public access. There is, however, a private park that has a private fishing dock on Rutledge Court, on the north side of the lake.
