= Stoltz House =

Historic house in Montana, United States

- U.S. National Register of Historic Places
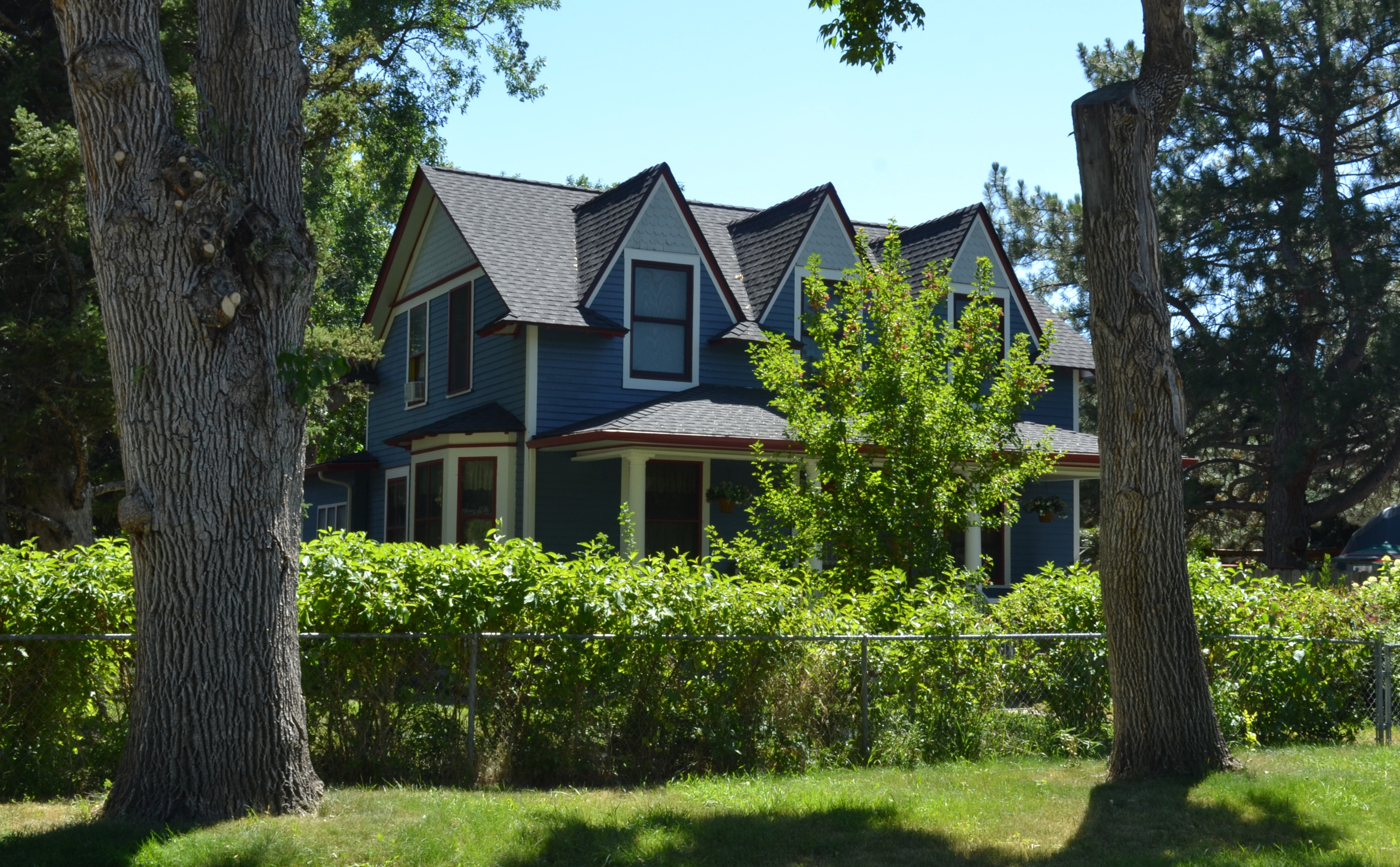

- Location within Montana Location within the United States
- Location: 405 S.W. First St., Park City, Montana
- Coordinates: 45°37′45″N 108°54′44″W
- Area: less than one acre
- Built: 1906
- Built by: Fred G. Stoltz
- Architectural style: Classical Revival
- NRHP reference No.: 91000422
- Added to NRHP: April 16, 1991

The Stoltz House, at 405 S.W. First St. in Park City, Montana, was built in 1906. It was listed on the National Register of Historic Places in 1991.

It is Classical Revival in style, and is believed to be the oldest house in Park City from its settlement period.

In 1990, trees on the property included some of the oldest fruit trees in the Yellowstone Valley.
