= Dean, Montana =

- unincorporated community
- Location within Montana Location within the United States
- Coordinates: 45°24′17″N 109°41′26″W
- Country: United States
- State: Montana
- County: Stillwater
- Elevation: 5,236 ft (1,596 m)
- Time zone: UTC-7 (Mountain (MST))
  - Summer (DST): UTC-6 (MDT)
- ZIP code: 59061
- Area code: 406
- GNIS feature ID: 782167

Dean is an unincorporated community located in Stillwater County, Montana, United States.

Dean is at an elevation of 5,244 feet and appears on the Beehive U.S. Geological Survey Map, while sharing a ZIP code with Nye of 59061.

== History ==
Located on the north side of the Beartooth Mountains, Dean has its roots mainly in agriculture and a few nearby mines. Dean's post office was established on Mar 10, 1902 with Bessie Haskin as its first postmaster. The post office was closed on April 15, 1914, and then reopened from 1915 to 1951.

Today, Dean survives as a small community with a number of permanent and seasonal homes.
