= Columbus Southwest Airport =

Airport in Ohio, United States

- IATA: none; ICAO: none; FAA LID: 04I

Summary
- Airport type: Public use
- Owner: James Edward Bowers
- Serves: Columbus, Ohio
- Elevation AMSL: 920 ft (280 m)
- Coordinates: 39°54′40″N 083°11′20″W

Map
- Location of airport in Ohio 04I (the United States)

Runways
Direction	Length		Surface
Direction	ft	m	Surface
6/24	2,382	726	Turf

Statistics (2010)
- Aircraft operations: 11,833
- Based aircraft: 16
- Source: Federal Aviation Administration

Columbus Southwest Airport (FAA LID: 04I) was a privately owned, public use airport located 11 nautical miles (13 mi, 20 km) southwest of the central business district of Columbus, in Franklin County, Ohio, United States. It was abandoned in 2020.

== History ==
The airport has been open since at least the 1950s, with its first depiction coming in 1966.

In 2020, a storm destroyed much of the airport's facilities. Though tax money was used for repairs, the airport's owner could not reimburse the county. The airport was abandoned on April 1 of that year, and it was sold to a local farmer.

== Facilities and aircraft ==
Columbus Southwest Airport covered an area of 14 acres (6 ha) at an elevation of 920 feet (280 m) above mean sea level. It had one runway designated as runway 6/24 with a turf surface and measuring 2,382 by 120 feet (726 x 37 m).

For the 12-month period ending July 26, 2010, the airport had 11,833 general aviation aircraft operations, an average of 32 per day. At that time there were 16 aircraft based at this airport, all single-engine airplanes.
