= Limestone, Montana =

- Town
- Location within Montana Location within the United States
- Coordinates: 45°28′40″N 109°54′09″W
- Country: United States
- State: Montana
- County: Stillwater
- Elevation: 5,535 ft (1,687 m)

Population (2010)
  - Total: 17
- Time zone: UTC-7 (Mountain (MST))
  - Summer (DST): UTC-6 (MDT)
- ZIP code: 59061
- Area code: 406
- GNIS feature ID: 786139

Limestone is a town located in Stillwater County, Montana, United States.

Limestone appears on the Meyer Mountain U.S. Geological Survey Map.

== History ==
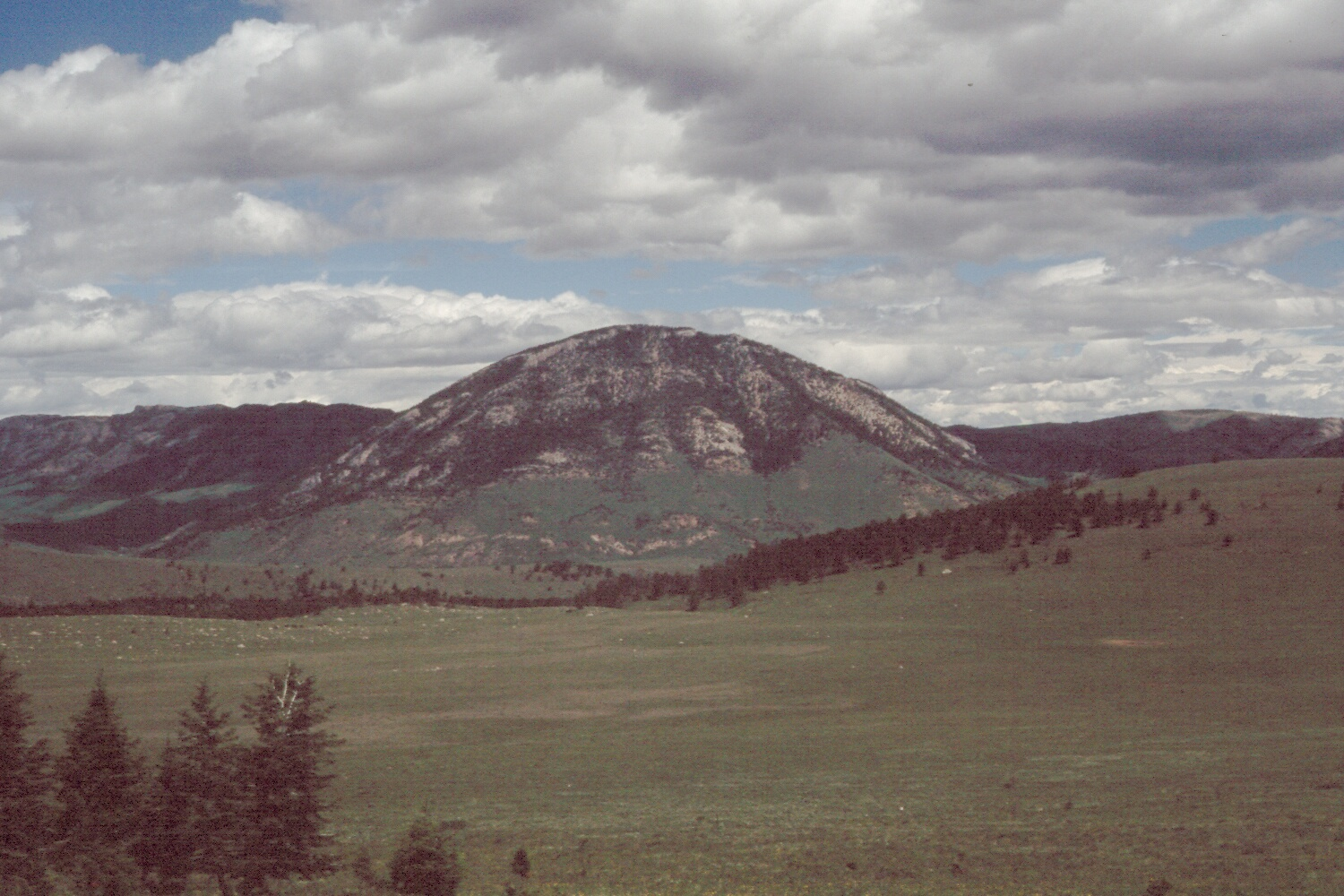
Limestone Butte, a laccolith of granite with a remnant of limestone at the crest.

Limestone was a mining community situated along Lodgepole Creek and sat at the foot of Limestone Butte, for which the town was named. The town was small but busy. The post office operated at Limestone from 1910 to 1953. Today Limestone is a ghost town with a number of buildings left standing, including the former grocery store and post office.
