= Mystic Lake (Stillwater County, Montana) =

Lake of Stillwater County, Montana, United States

Coordinates: 45.222°N 109.784°W

Mystic Lake is the second deepest lake in the Beartooth Mountains, the deepest being Deep Lake. It has the largest sandy beach in the Absaroka-Beartooth Wilderness. The Montana Power Company utilizes the power of this large lake and has a dam present. Mystic Lake supports a rainbow trout fishery. Hiking the three-mile trail up to Mystic Lake provides views of West Rosebud Valley and a few other lakes.

== Climate ==
Summers are warm with cool nights. Winters are cold and extremely snowy with heavy snowfall for most of the year, and are the second snowiest in the state of Montana after Cooke City.

According to the Köppen Climate Classification system, Mystic Lake has a subarctic climate, abbreviated "Dfc" on climate maps.

Climate data for Mystic Lake, Montana, 1991–2020 normals, extremes 1924–present
Month	Jan	Feb	Mar	Apr	May	Jun	Jul	Aug	Sep	Oct	Nov	Dec	Year
Record high °F (°C)	60 (16)	62 (17)	66 (19)	80 (27)	83 (28)	91 (33)	95 (35)	92 (33)	88 (31)	80 (27)	68 (20)	62 (17)	95 (35)
Mean maximum °F (°C)	50.7 (10.4)	50.1 (10.1)	56.9 (13.8)	65.3 (18.5)	73.4 (23.0)	80.6 (27.0)	85.1 (29.5)	84.0 (28.9)	80.5 (26.9)	70.0 (21.1)	56.9 (13.8)	48.8 (9.3)	86.3 (30.2)
Mean daily maximum °F (°C)	34.5 (1.4)	34.3 (1.3)	41.4 (5.2)	48.0 (8.9)	56.5 (13.6)	66.0 (18.9)	74.7 (23.7)	74.1 (23.4)	65.5 (18.6)	52.0 (11.1)	39.9 (4.4)	32.8 (0.4)	51.6 (10.9)
Daily mean °F (°C)	26.5 (−3.1)	25.6 (−3.6)	31.8 (−0.1)	37.4 (3.0)	45.7 (7.6)	54.3 (12.4)	62.3 (16.8)	61.9 (16.6)	53.6 (12.0)	42.1 (5.6)	32.0 (0.0)	25.3 (−3.7)	41.5 (5.3)
Mean daily minimum °F (°C)	18.5 (−7.5)	16.9 (−8.4)	22.2 (−5.4)	26.9 (−2.8)	34.9 (1.6)	42.7 (5.9)	50.0 (10.0)	49.6 (9.8)	41.7 (5.4)	32.3 (0.2)	24.0 (−4.4)	17.7 (−7.9)	31.5 (−0.3)
Mean minimum °F (°C)	−6.6 (−21.4)	−5.2 (−20.7)	−0.2 (−17.9)	11.0 (−11.7)	20.5 (−6.4)	31.3 (−0.4)	41.0 (5.0)	38.3 (3.5)	25.6 (−3.6)	11.5 (−11.4)	1.4 (−17.0)	−6.8 (−21.6)	−16.9 (−27.2)
Record low °F (°C)	−35 (−37)	−38 (−39)	−23 (−31)	−13 (−25)	1 (−17)	21 (−6)	29 (−2)	29 (−2)	5 (−15)	−8 (−22)	−24 (−31)	−35 (−37)	−38 (−39)
Average precipitation inches (mm)	1.12 (28)	1.49 (38)	2.00 (51)	2.73 (69)	4.10 (104)	3.01 (76)	2.30 (58)	1.86 (47)	2.03 (52)	2.55 (65)	1.92 (49)	1.40 (36)	26.51 (673)
Average snowfall inches (cm)	17.4 (44)	25.3 (64)	31.6 (80)	34.0 (86)	14.6 (37)	1.7 (4.3)	0.0 (0.0)	0.0 (0.0)	3.8 (9.7)	20.1 (51)	22.6 (57)	21.6 (55)	192.7 (488)
Average precipitation days (≥ 0.01 in)	7.9	9.2	11.2	12.4	14.1	14.4	12.1	11.7	9.2	10.3	9.1	9.6	131.2
Average snowy days (≥ 0.1 in)	7.6	8.4	9.1	8.8	3.5	0.4	0.0	0.0	1.1	5.2	7.3	8.5	59.9
Source 1: NOAA
Source 2: National Weather Service
