= Nye, Montana =

Nye
- Unincorporated community
- Location within Montana Location within the United States
- Coordinates: 45°26′02″N 109°48′25″W
- Country: United States
- State: Montana
- County: Stillwater

Area
  - Total: 0.36 sq mi (0.92 km^{2})
  - Land: 0.36 sq mi (0.92 km^{2})
  - Water: 0 sq mi (0.00 km^{2})
- Elevation: 4,843 ft (1,476 m)

Population (2020)
  - Total: 38
  - Density: 107.6/sq mi (41.53/km^{2})
- Time zone: UTC−07:00 (Mountain (MST))
  - Summer (DST): UTC−06:00 (MDT)
- ZIP Code: 59061
- Area code: 406
- GNIS feature ID: 2806667

Nye is an unincorporated community in Stillwater County, Montana, United States. As of the 2020 census, Nye had a population of 38.

== History ==
Originally a copper mining camp, the town sprang into existence when Jack Nye and the Hedges brothers staked their claim. Mining continues to be an important part of the area's economy. Nye's first post office was established on October 6, 1887, with Thomas Ross as its first postmaster. The post office is a contract post office and serves a large land area including all residents beyond the building at 2027 Nye Road (Carters Camp).

The Minnesota Mining and Smelting Company built a copper smelter here in 1889, but it was shut down when it was discovered that they were illegally on the Crow Indian Reservation. Mining resumed after the reservation boundary moved in 1890.

Nye was affected by the 2022 Montana floods when the Stillwater River flooded.

== Climate ==
The climatic type is dominated by the winter season, a long, bitterly cold period with short, clear days, relatively little precipitation mostly in the form of snow, and low humidity. The Köppen Climate Classification subtype for this climate is "Dfc" (Continental Subarctic Climate).

Climate data for Nye, Montana, 1991–2020 normals, extremes 1908–present
Month	Jan	Feb	Mar	Apr	May	Jun	Jul	Aug	Sep	Oct	Nov	Dec	Year
Record high °F (°C)	66 (19)	71 (22)	78 (26)	93 (34)	94 (34)	99 (37)	104 (40)	103 (39)	96 (36)	90 (32)	78 (26)	66 (19)	104 (40)
Mean maximum °F (°C)	56.6 (13.7)	57.4 (14.1)	66.4 (19.1)	75.1 (23.9)	81.9 (27.7)	89.5 (31.9)	95.6 (35.3)	94.1 (34.5)	90.6 (32.6)	79.7 (26.5)	65.1 (18.4)	55.4 (13.0)	95.6 (35.3)
Mean daily maximum °F (°C)	39.6 (4.2)	40.2 (4.6)	47.6 (8.7)	54.6 (12.6)	63.0 (17.2)	72.4 (22.4)	82.5 (28.1)	82.6 (28.1)	73.1 (22.8)	58.8 (14.9)	45.6 (7.6)	37.7 (3.2)	58.1 (14.5)
Daily mean °F (°C)	29.4 (−1.4)	29.3 (−1.5)	36.3 (2.4)	42.3 (5.7)	50.1 (10.1)	57.8 (14.3)	65.3 (18.5)	64.8 (18.2)	56.7 (13.7)	46.0 (7.8)	35.7 (2.1)	28.2 (−2.1)	45.2 (7.3)
Mean daily minimum °F (°C)	19.3 (−7.1)	18.5 (−7.5)	25.0 (−3.9)	30.0 (−1.1)	37.1 (2.8)	43.2 (6.2)	48.0 (8.9)	47.1 (8.4)	40.3 (4.6)	33.2 (0.7)	25.8 (−3.4)	18.7 (−7.4)	32.2 (0.1)
Mean minimum °F (°C)	−12.1 (−24.5)	−8.7 (−22.6)	2.1 (−16.6)	13.5 (−10.3)	23.1 (−4.9)	32.7 (0.4)	39.4 (4.1)	36.4 (2.4)	26.2 (−3.2)	11.7 (−11.3)	−3.0 (−19.4)	−10.9 (−23.8)	−23.5 (−30.8)
Record low °F (°C)	−40 (−40)	−38 (−39)	−32 (−36)	−5 (−21)	13 (−11)	15 (−9)	24 (−4)	14 (−10)	12 (−11)	−11 (−24)	−26 (−32)	−40 (−40)	−40 (−40)
Average precipitation inches (mm)	0.45 (11)	0.84 (21)	1.07 (27)	1.81 (46)	3.31 (84)	3.05 (77)	1.62 (41)	1.15 (29)	1.44 (37)	1.67 (42)	0.83 (21)	0.66 (17)	17.9 (453)
Average snowfall inches (cm)	7.2 (18)	9.9 (25)	10.0 (25)	13.1 (33)	2.4 (6.1)	0.1 (0.25)	0.0 (0.0)	0.0 (0.0)	0.2 (0.51)	7.5 (19)	9.9 (25)	9.4 (24)	69.7 (175.86)
Average precipitation days (≥ 0.01 in)	4.4	4.8	6.9	9.4	11.6	11.5	9.9	7.9	7.0	7.4	5.8	5.3	91.9
Average snowy days (≥ 0.1 in)	3.5	4.1	4.8	3.1	0.8	0.0	0.0	0.0	0.2	1.4	3.4	4.2	25.5
Source 1: NOAA
Source 2: National Weather Service

== Demographics ==
Historical population
Census	Pop.	Note	%±
2020	38		—
U.S. Decennial Census

== Media ==
The Stillwater County News is a newspaper serving the area. It is printed weekly and also available online.

The town receives radio and television from the wider Billings area.
