= Stillwater County, Montana =

County in Montana, United States

- County
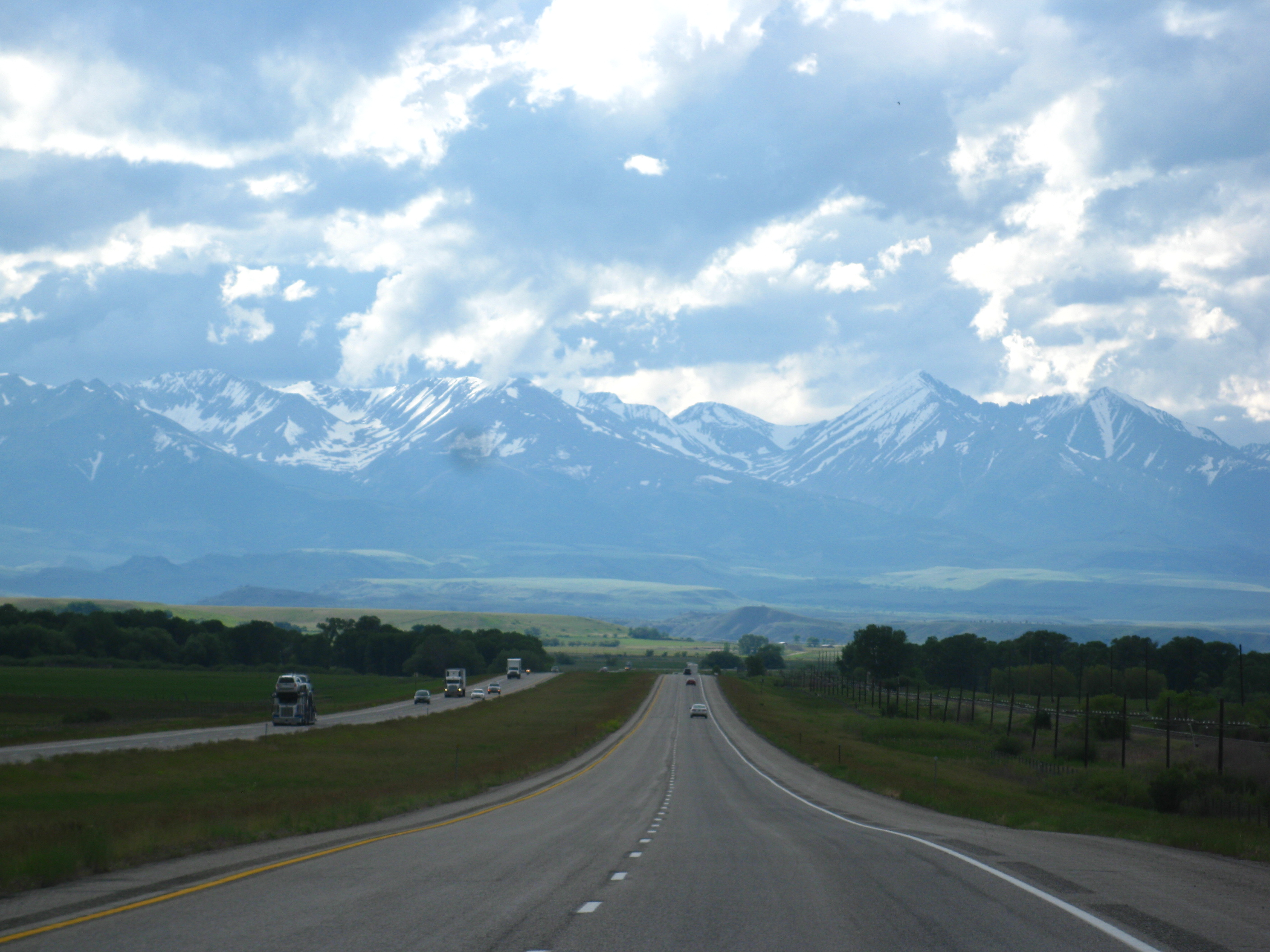
- Beartooth Mountains from Park City

- Location within the U.S. state of Montana
- Coordinates: 45°40′N 109°23′W
- Country: United States
- State: Montana
- Founded: 1913
- Named for: Stillwater River
- Seat: Columbus
- Largest town: Columbus

Area
  - Total: 1,805 sq mi (4,670 km^{2})
  - Land: 1,795 sq mi (4,650 km^{2})
  - Water: 9.2 sq mi (24 km^{2}) 0.5%

Population (2020)
  - Total: 8,963
  - Estimate (2025): 9,445 ▲
  - Density: 4.993/sq mi (1.928/km^{2})
- Time zone: UTC−7 (Mountain)
  - Summer (DST): UTC−6 (MDT)
- Congressional district: 2nd
- Website: www.stillwatercountymt.gov
- Montana county number 32

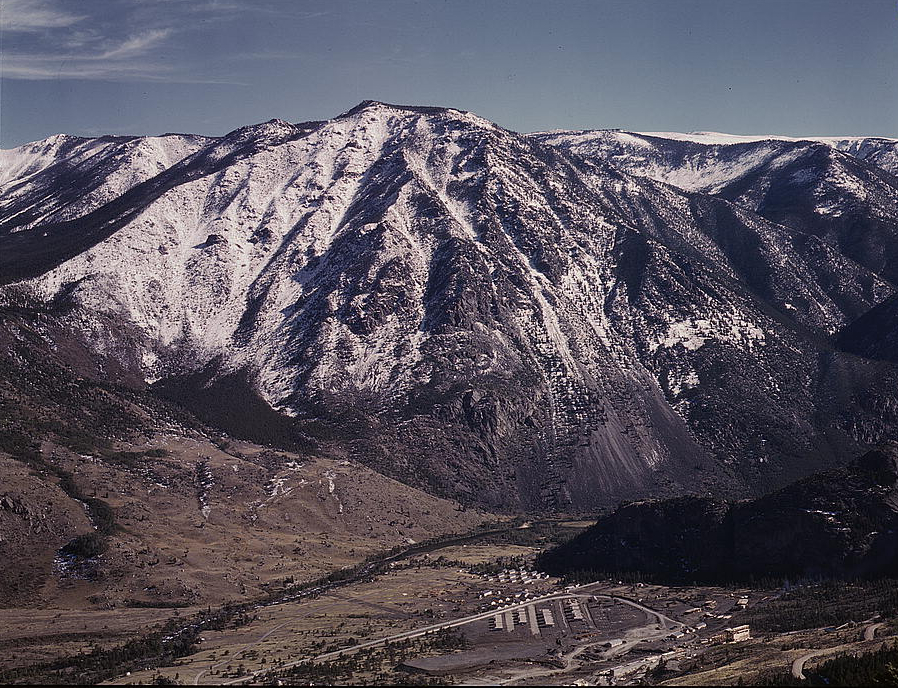
Mouat chromite mine and mill, 1942

Stillwater County is a county in the U.S. state of Montana. As of the 2020 census, the population was 8,963. Its county seat is Columbus.

== Geography ==
According to the United States Census Bureau, the county has a total area of 1,805 square miles (4,670 km^{2}), of which 1,795 square miles (4,650 km^{2}) is land and 9.2 square miles (24 km^{2}) (0.5%) is water.

=== Major highways ===
- Interstate 90
- U.S. Highway 10 (Former)
- Montana Highway 78

=== Adjacent counties ===
- Golden Valley County – north
- Yellowstone County – east
- Carbon County – south
- Park County – southwest
- Sweet Grass County – west

=== National protected areas ===
- Custer National Forest (part)
- Grass Lake National Wildlife Refuge
- Hailstone National Wildlife Refuge

== Demographics ==
Historical population
| Census | Pop. | Note | %± |
|---|---|---|---|
| 1920 | 7,630 | | — |
| 1930 | 6,253 | | −18.0% |
| 1940 | 5,694 | | −8.9% |
| 1950 | 5,416 | | −4.9% |
| 1960 | 5,526 | | 2.0% |
| 1970 | 4,632 | | −16.2% |
| 1980 | 5,598 | | 20.9% |
| 1990 | 6,536 | | 16.8% |
| 2000 | 8,195 | | 25.4% |
| 2010 | 9,117 | | 11.3% |
| 2020 | 8,963 | | −1.7% |
| 2025 (est.) | 9,445 | ▲ | 5.4% |
U.S. Decennial Census; 1790–1960, 1900–1990, 1990–2000, 2010–2020

=== 2020 census ===
As of the 2020 census, there were 8,963 people living in the county. Of the residents, 20.8% were under the age of 18 and 24.4% were 65 years of age or older; the median age was 48.6 years. For every 100 females there were 103.8 males, and for every 100 females age 18 and over there were 103.5 males. 0.0% of residents lived in urban areas and 100.0% lived in rural areas.

The racial makeup of the county was 91.7% White, 0.2% Black or African American, 1.0% American Indian and Alaska Native, 0.3% Asian, 0.9% from some other race, and 5.9% from two or more races. Hispanic or Latino residents of any race comprised 3.0% of the population.

There were 3,777 households in the county, of which 24.8% had children under the age of 18 living with them and 17.2% had a female householder with no spouse or partner present. About 26.3% of all households were made up of individuals and 13.7% had someone living alone who was 65 years of age or older.

There were 4,659 housing units, of which 18.9% were vacant. Among occupied housing units, 81.0% were owner-occupied and 19.0% were renter-occupied. The homeowner vacancy rate was 1.8% and the rental vacancy rate was 7.7%.

=== 2010 census ===
As of the 2010 census, there were 9,117 people, 3,796 households, and 2,657 families in the county. The population density was 5.1 inhabitants per square mile (2.0/km^{2}). There were 4,803 housing units at an average density of 2.7 units per square mile (1.0 units/km^{2}). The racial makeup of the county was 96.8% white, 0.8% American Indian, 0.3% Asian, 0.1% black or African American, 0.4% from other races, and 1.6% from two or more races. Those of Hispanic or Latino origin made up 2.3% of the population. In terms of ancestry, 34.7% were German, 14.1% were Irish, 14.0% were English, 10.8% were Norwegian, and 6.9% were American.

Of the 3,796 households, 28.9% had children under the age of 18 living with them, 60.6% were married couples living together, 6.0% had a female householder with no husband present, 30.0% were non-families, and 25.8% of all households were made up of individuals. The average household size was 2.37 and the average family size was 2.84. The median age was 45.7 years.

The median income for a household in the county was $57,227 and the median income for a family was $65,438. Males had a median income of $51,830 versus $26,909 for females. The per capita income for the county was $27,168. About 6.0% of families and 9.5% of the population were below the poverty line, including 17.9% of those under age 18 and 7.2% of those age 65 or over.

== Politics ==
Stillwater County is a heavily Republican county in presidential elections. It has not voted for a Democratic presidential candidate since Franklin D. Roosevelt in 1936.

United States presidential election results for Stillwater County, Montana
| Year | Republican | | Democratic | | Third party(ies) | |
| Year | No. | % | No. | % | No. | % |
|---|---|---|---|---|---|---|
| 1916 | 918 | 42.01% | 1,197 | 54.78% | 70 | 3.20% |
| 1920 | 1,721 | 70.50% | 664 | 27.20% | 56 | 2.29% |
| 1924 | 1,412 | 59.88% | 375 | 15.90% | 571 | 24.22% |
| 1928 | 1,687 | 70.06% | 711 | 29.53% | 10 | 0.42% |
| 1932 | 1,085 | 44.23% | 1,281 | 52.22% | 87 | 3.55% |
| 1936 | 1,034 | 42.69% | 1,292 | 53.34% | 96 | 3.96% |
| 1940 | 1,255 | 50.71% | 1,201 | 48.53% | 19 | 0.77% |
| 1944 | 1,201 | 56.07% | 934 | 43.60% | 7 | 0.33% |
| 1948 | 1,137 | 54.48% | 890 | 42.64% | 60 | 2.87% |
| 1952 | 1,689 | 67.02% | 816 | 32.38% | 15 | 0.60% |
| 1956 | 1,540 | 60.32% | 1,013 | 39.68% | 0 | 0.00% |
| 1960 | 1,455 | 58.41% | 1,036 | 41.59% | 0 | 0.00% |
| 1964 | 1,140 | 50.20% | 1,130 | 49.76% | 1 | 0.04% |
| 1968 | 1,347 | 61.20% | 676 | 30.71% | 178 | 8.09% |
| 1972 | 1,698 | 67.95% | 716 | 28.65% | 85 | 3.40% |
| 1976 | 1,446 | 54.88% | 1,143 | 43.38% | 46 | 1.75% |
| 1980 | 1,828 | 61.26% | 919 | 30.80% | 237 | 7.94% |
| 1984 | 2,118 | 65.01% | 1,100 | 33.76% | 40 | 1.23% |
| 1988 | 1,920 | 56.82% | 1,407 | 41.64% | 52 | 1.54% |
| 1992 | 1,390 | 38.19% | 1,178 | 32.36% | 1,072 | 29.45% |
| 1996 | 1,871 | 49.24% | 1,282 | 33.74% | 647 | 17.03% |
| 2000 | 2,765 | 70.57% | 925 | 23.61% | 228 | 5.82% |
| 2004 | 3,090 | 73.34% | 1,025 | 24.33% | 98 | 2.33% |
| 2008 | 2,991 | 64.09% | 1,512 | 32.40% | 164 | 3.51% |
| 2012 | 3,337 | 70.97% | 1,248 | 26.54% | 117 | 2.49% |
| 2016 | 3,661 | 75.13% | 908 | 18.63% | 304 | 6.24% |
| 2020 | 4,462 | 77.95% | 1,156 | 20.20% | 106 | 1.85% |
| 2024 | 4,699 | 79.56% | 1,056 | 17.88% | 151 | 2.56% |

== Communities ==
=== Town ===
- Columbus (county seat)

=== Census-designated places ===
- Absarokee
- Fishtail
- Nye
- Park City
- Rapelje
- Reed Point

=== Unincorporated communities ===
- Beehive
- Dean
- Meyers Creek (partial)
- Molt
- Reed Point

=== Ghost towns ===
- Limestone
- Springtime
- Wheat Basin

== See also ==
- List of lakes in Stillwater County, Montana
- List of mountains in Stillwater County, Montana
- National Register of Historic Places listings in Stillwater County, Montana
