= Charles M. Russell National Wildlife Refuge =

National Wildlife Refuge in Montana, U.S.

- IUCN category IV (habitat/species management area)
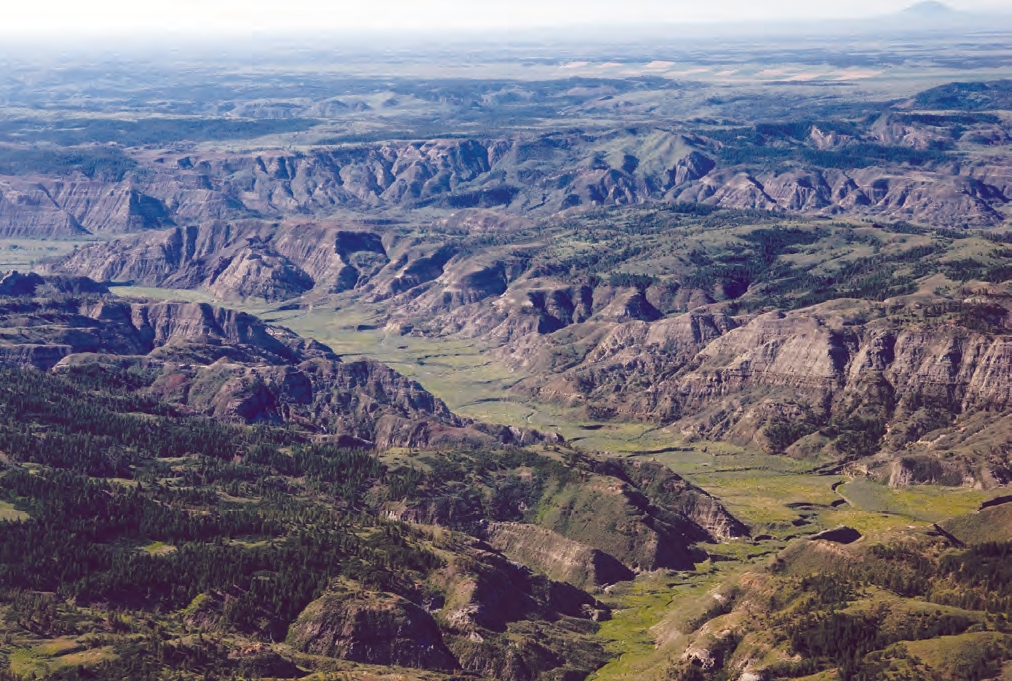

- Location within the United States
- Location: Montana, USA
- Nearest city: Billings, MT
- Coordinates: 47°41′N 107°11′W
- Area: 915,814 acres (3,706.17 km^{2})
- Established: 1936
- Visitors: 250,000 (in 2010)
- Governing body: U.S. Fish and Wildlife Service
- Website: Charles M. Russell National Wildlife Refuge

The Charles M. Russell National Wildlife Refuge (abbreviated as the CMR NWR) is a National Wildlife Refuge in the U.S. state of Montana on the Missouri River. The refuge surrounds Fort Peck Reservoir and is 915,814 acres (3,706.17 km^{2}) in size. It is the second-largest National Wildlife Refuge in the lower 48 states of the United States, and the largest in Montana. Created in 1936, it was originally called the Fort Peck Game Range. It was renamed in 1963 after Montana artist Charles M. Russell, a famous painter of the American West. In 1976, the "range" was made a "refuge" (which legally changed the way the area was managed).

== History ==
The establishment of the Russell National Wildlife Refuge is closely tied to the construction of Fort Peck Dam. The lower Missouri River had long been used for commerce, but commercial ships largely stopped using the upper portion of the river after the railroads pushed west in the 1880s. Extensive flooding in the lower part of the river in 1903 and a push for development of the upper portion by the states of South Dakota, North Dakota, and Montana in the 1920s led the federal government to consider building large dams on the Missouri. The dams would not only generate electricity for use by railroads and industry, but they would aid in flood prevention and create large reservoirs which could be used for commercial traffic. With the onset of the Great Depression in October 1929, unemployment became a severe problem in Montana. The Franklin D. Roosevelt administration saw dam building as a way of providing unemployment relief. On December 12, 1933, Roosevelt issued Executive Order 6491, which turned federal land over to the United States Army Corps of Engineers for the construction of the Fort Peck Dam. Additional lands were turned over to the Corps on May 8, 1934 (Executive Order 6707), September 11, 1934 (Executive Order 6841), and April 3, 1936 (Executive Order 7331).

In 1929, President Herbert Hoover signed into law the Migratory Bird Conservation Act, which authorized the federal government to purchase or lease land for the establishment of waterfowl refuges. In 1934, President Roosevelt signed into law the Migratory Bird Hunting Stamp Act, which generated revenue for purchase of waterfowl refuge lands by requiring bird hunters using federal land to purchase a "duck stamp" (essentially a permit allowing them to hunt fowl). In 1935, the Roosevelt administration began to consider whether a "Fort Peck Migratory Bird Refuge" should be established around the soon-to-be-filled Fort Peck Reservoir. Noted wildlife biologist Olaus Murie was sent to the area to document the soils, topography, vegetation, and wildlife in the area. Murie's comprehensive report proved critical in convincing the Roosevelt administration that the area around Fort Peck Reservoir should be a wildlife refuge, not merely for birds.

On December 11, 1936, President Roosevelt issued Executive Order 7509, establishing the Fort Peck Game Range. Jurisdiction over the range was transferred from the Army Corps of Engineers to the Bureau of Biological Survey (the precursor to the U.S. Fish and Wildlife Service). The primary purpose of the range was the preservation of wildlife, although grazing by domestic livestock was permitted.

Over the intervening years, the protected area expanded several times and its name and purpose were changed. On April 13, 1942, President Roosevelt issued Executive Order 9132 which turned over even more Corps-administered land to the game refuge. On February 25, 1963, President John F. Kennedy issued Public Land Order 2951, changing the name of the range to the Charles M. Russell National Wildlife Range. On March 25, 1969, President Lyndon B. Johnson issued Public Land Order 4588, which established the UL Bend National Wildlife Refuge. This order dissolved Executive Order 7509, and re-established the Russell National Game Refuge under the authority of the Migratory Bird Conservation Commission. The exploitation of the UL Bend National Wildlife Refuge for oil, natural gas, coal, and other minerals was prohibited on May 15, 1970, by Public Land Order 4826.

The 1970s brought additional changes to the protected area. Both the Russell Game Refuge and the UL Bend National Wildlife Refuge were transferred on April 25, 1975, to the Bureau of Land Management by Public Land Order 5498. A year later, Congress amended the Wild and Scenic Rivers Act to designate the Missouri River and its banks within Russell National Wildlife Range as part of the Upper Missouri River National Wild and Scenic River system. On October 19, 1976, Congress established the UL Bend Wilderness as a wilderness area within the UL Bend National Wildlife Refuge. Over time, the wilderness area would expand to 20,819 acres (84.25 km^{2}). On April 25, 1978, the United States Secretary of the Interior issued Public Land Order 5635. This order revoked Public Land Order 5498, changed the name of the protected area to the Charles M. Russell National Wildlife Refuge, and turned the area over to the U.S. Fish and Wildlife Service for management.

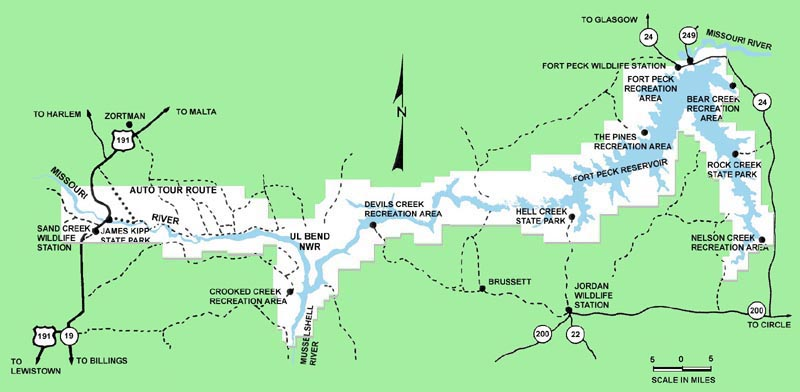
Map of Charles M. Russell National Wildlife Refuge

Two important changes were made to the refuge in the 1990s. On September 28, 1993, the Secretary of the Interior issued Public Land Order 6997, which prohibited all mineral exploration within the Charles M. Russell National Wildlife Refuge for 20 years. On December 28 of that same year, the General Services Administration transferred of 6,020 acres (24.4 km^{2}) of land from the Army Corps of Engineers to the wildlife refuge.

As of September 2010, the Charles M. Russell National Wildlife Refuge contained 915,814 acres (3,706.17 km^{2}) of land. 739,097 acres (2,991.02 km^{2}) of land within the refuge were withdrawn from settlement, mineral exploration, grazing, and other uses under federal government's general public land laws. 358,196 acres (1,449.57 km^{2}) of the refuge's 915,814 acres (3,706.17 km^{2}) are under the sole jurisdiction of the Fish and Wildlife Service. The Army Corps of Engineers has primary jurisdiction on 557,618 acres (2,256.60 km^{2}) of land, with the FWS having secondary jurisdiction there. A patchwork of federal agencies retains primary jurisdiction on another 147,399 acres (596.50 km^{2}) of land within the refuge, with the FWS retaining secondary jurisdiction. There are another 36,000 acres (150 km^{2}) of state land and 41,000 acres (170 km^{2}) of private land within the refuge, with the state land managed by the Montana Department of Natural Resources and Conservation in cooperation with FWS.

The Russell National Wildlife Refuge and the UL Bend National Wildlife Refuge are managed as a single unit by the U.S. Fish and Wildlife Service.

Large areas of both refuges are legally designated as wilderness. The 56,048-acre (226.82 km^{2}) UL Bend National Wildlife Refuge contains the 20,819-acre (84.25 km^{2}) UL Bend Wilderness. Another 15 wilderness study areas totalling 155,288 acres (628.43 km^{2}) are contained within the Russell National Wildlife Refuge. These wilderness study areas are being managed as if they were wilderness while Congress considers them for formal designation as wilderness.

== Geography ==
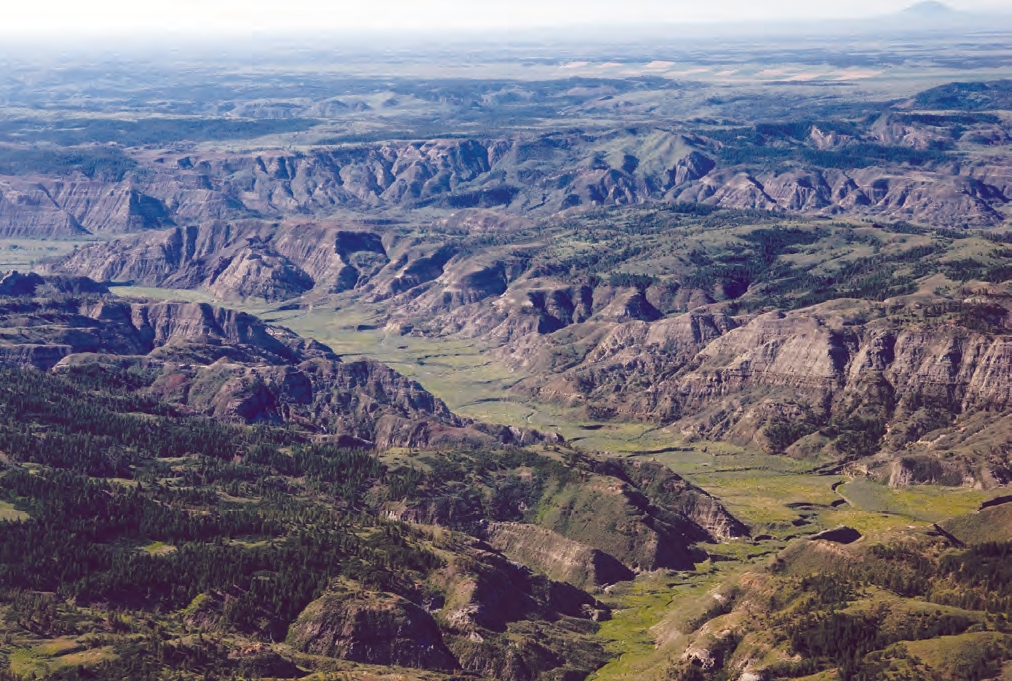
The topography of the Russell Wildlife Refuge is highly varied.

Beginning about 100 million years ago, a large inland sea known as the Western Interior Seaway covered most of the middle of the modern-day countries of the United States and Canada. It stretched from the Gulf of Mexico to the Arctic Ocean and was 2,500 feet (760 m) deep and 600 miles (970 km) wide. A wide range of dinosaurs, including Ankylosaurus, Pachycephalosaurus, Thescelosaurus, Triceratops, and Tyrannosaurus, inhabited the area. The combination of extensive prehistoric fauna and a shallow inland sea led to significant preservation and fossilization of animal and plant remains.

Approximately 1.5 million years ago, the Missouri River, the Yellowstone River, and Musselshell River all flowed northward into a terminal lake. During the last glacial period, the Laurentide and Cordilleran ice sheets pushed these rivers southward into their present courses. The Charles M. Russell National Wildlife Refuge lies atop these glaciated plains. The glaciers scoured extensive amounts of alluvial deposits from the area, and caused significant erosion of the areas around the Missouri River. These factors left the Russell National Wildlife Refuge rich in readily exposed and recovered fossilized plants and animals.

Native Americans frequently visited the area due to the large number of big game animals which utilized the river. Unlike much of the rest of the Missouri River in the area, the banks of the river at the UL Bend are low and gently sloping. Numerous fords exist near the bend as well. This drew large numbers of American bison, mule deer, pronghorn, Rocky Mountain elk, and white-tailed deer to the area. It is well documented that the Assiniboine, Gros Ventre, and Piegan Blackfeet hunted in the refuge. The origination of the name "UL Bend" is not clear. However, it is most likely named for the U.L. Cattle Company of Great Falls, Montana, which was established in 1896 by Oren and Will Bachues and which grazed herds of cattle there.

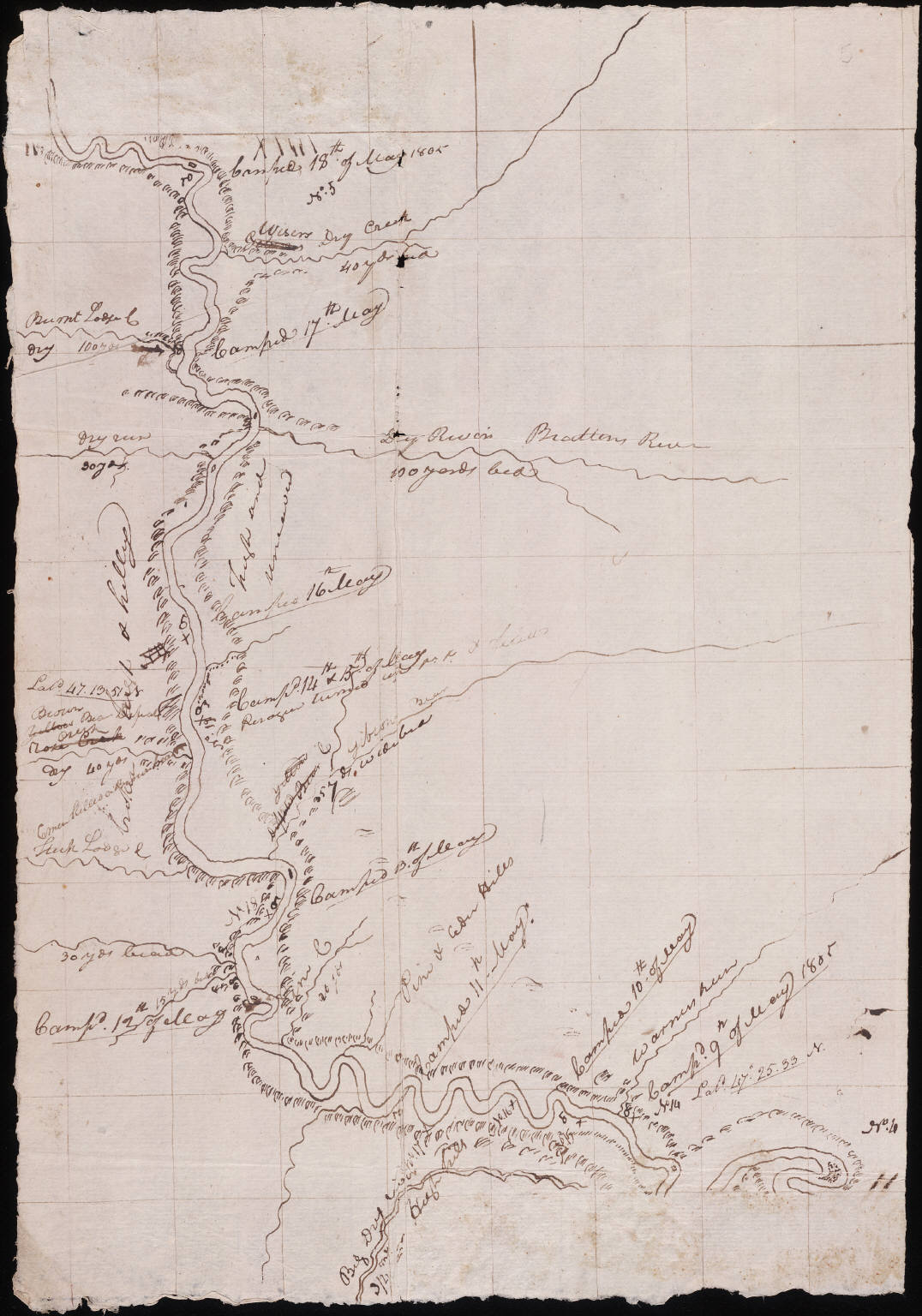
A map by Meriwether Lewis documenting the Corps of Discovery's activities between May 9 and May 18, 1805 as they passed through what is now the CMRNWR.

The Lewis and Clark Expedition (also known as the "Corps of Discovery") named many of the features located in the refuge, and several important events occurred while the expedition passed through the area in May 1805. On May 8, the Corps passed the Milk River, named for the amount of sediment contained in the river during the spring run-off. On the evening of May 8, the expedition camped a mile or two above Fort Peck Dam. On May 9, the Corps of Discovery entered what is now the CMR NWR. That day, they passed what Meriwether Lewis called Big Dry Creek (now submerged beneath Fort Peck Reservoir, and known as the Dry Arm). The members of the expedition began to suffer from swollen and red eyes, boils, and abscesses from the amount of alkali in the river and soil. At about 5:00 P.M. on May 10, expedition member William E. Bratton was attacked by a grizzly bear. He shot it through the lungs, but the bear continued to charge. Bratton outran the bear, which expedition members later tracked down and killed a few hours later. The creek which emptied into the Missouri River at site of the attack was named Bratton Creek (now called Big Timber Creek). Another bear encounter occurred on May 14. In the late afternoon, some of the men in the rear boats spotted a grizzly bear sleeping on a sandbar. Six men approached the bear, which woke up and attacked them. Four men shot the bear (with two bullets going through its lungs), but it continued to charge. Two more men shot the bear, but the men were forced to flee back to the river. Four men dispersed, and fired on the bear again, but it pursued them and chased them down a 20-foot (6.1 m) embankment into the river. Finally, one of the men shot the bear in the head, killing it. Lewis decided to call the creek near the spot where the six men almost died "Brown Bear Defeated Creek" (although today it is known as Snow Creek). That same day, the expedition nearly suffered a terrible loss of its journals and instruments. Toussaint Charbonneau was steering one of the expedition's pirogues when a sudden thunderstorm overtook them. The pirogue overturned, throwing nearly all of the expedition's journals, maps, papers, navigational and survey instruments, and medicine into the river. Charbonneau did nothing to save these materials. But Sacagawea, holding her three-month-old child Jean Baptiste, calmly stood in the rushing water and retrieved nearly all the supplies. The expedition spent two days at the site, drying out their instruments and papers.

Two more near-disasters on May 17 led to the naming of additional features. William Clark was nearly bitten by a rattlesnake while exploring a creek on the northern side of the river. This creek was named Rattlesnake Creek (although today it is called Timber Creek). The party camped near a creek on the south side of the river that evening. Clark saw a fortified Native American lodge a short distance up the creek, believing it to be an Atsina (Gros Ventre) site. Late that night, a cottonwood tree sheltering the camp caught fire from sparks rising from the expedition campfire. The men were barely able to get out of their tent and pull it out of the way before the tree came crashing down on the site. Lewis named this Burnt Lodge Creek (although today it is known as Seven Blackfoot Creek). On May 20, the expedition passed the Musselshell River. On May 22, the party passed another creek, which they decided to name Sacajawea Creek. (Later renamed Crooked Creek, the U.S. government formally changed the name back to Sacagawea Creek in 1979.) The Corps of Discovery left the CMR NWF on May 24 or 25, after spending a week passing through and exploring the area.

== Size and extent ==
The refuge extends for 125 miles (201 km) air miles along the Missouri River from Fort Peck Dam to the Fred Robinson Bridge on U.S. Route 191. The UL Bend National Wildlife Refuge (about half of which is contiguous with the UL Bend Wilderness) is located adjacent to the western section of the CMR NWF north of the "UL Bend" in the Missouri River. The far eastern portion of the 80-mile (130 km) long Missouri Breaks National Back Country Byway is also contained within the refuge. The western boundary of the CMR NWF abuts the Upper Missouri River Breaks National Monument. The refuge also incorporates portions of six Montana counties. From west to east they are Fergus, Phillips, Petroleum, Garfield, Valley, and McCone counties.

Legally, the Russell National Wildlife Refuge does not include acreage contained within the UL Bend National Wildlife Refuge, or acreage encompassed by the Fort Peck Reservoir. When the 245,000-acre (990 km^{2}) Fort Peck Reservoir is added to the acreage of the Russell Wildlife Refuge, the figure of 1,100,000 acres (4,500 km^{2}) is achieved. This is the most commonly cited size for the Russell Wildlife Refuge. But this figure is inaccurate because the reservoir is not legally part of the refuge.

== Flora, fauna, and management ==
There are four major types of habitat within the refuge: river bottom, riparian zones and wetlands, shoreline, and upland (including forested coulees and prairie).

From 1938 to 1976, the CMR NWF was administered jointly by the United States Department of Agriculture and the Department of the Interior. As a game range, the area was not as protected as it might have been, and both agencies struggled to maintain the range's ability to support wildlife while also permitting large numbers of domestic livestock to graze there. In 1976, Congress enacted the Game Range Act, which ended the joint administration of the refuge and transferred authority for its management from the Bureau of Land Management to the Fish and Wildlife Service. As of 2010, the Army Corps of Engineers continues to have primary management authority for a portion of the refuge, with the FWS having secondary authority in these areas. However, the Corps and the FWS have an agreement that allows the FWS to administer these areas for the Corps. The Corps and FWS continue to jointly manage the lakeshore and recreational areas and sites associated with them.

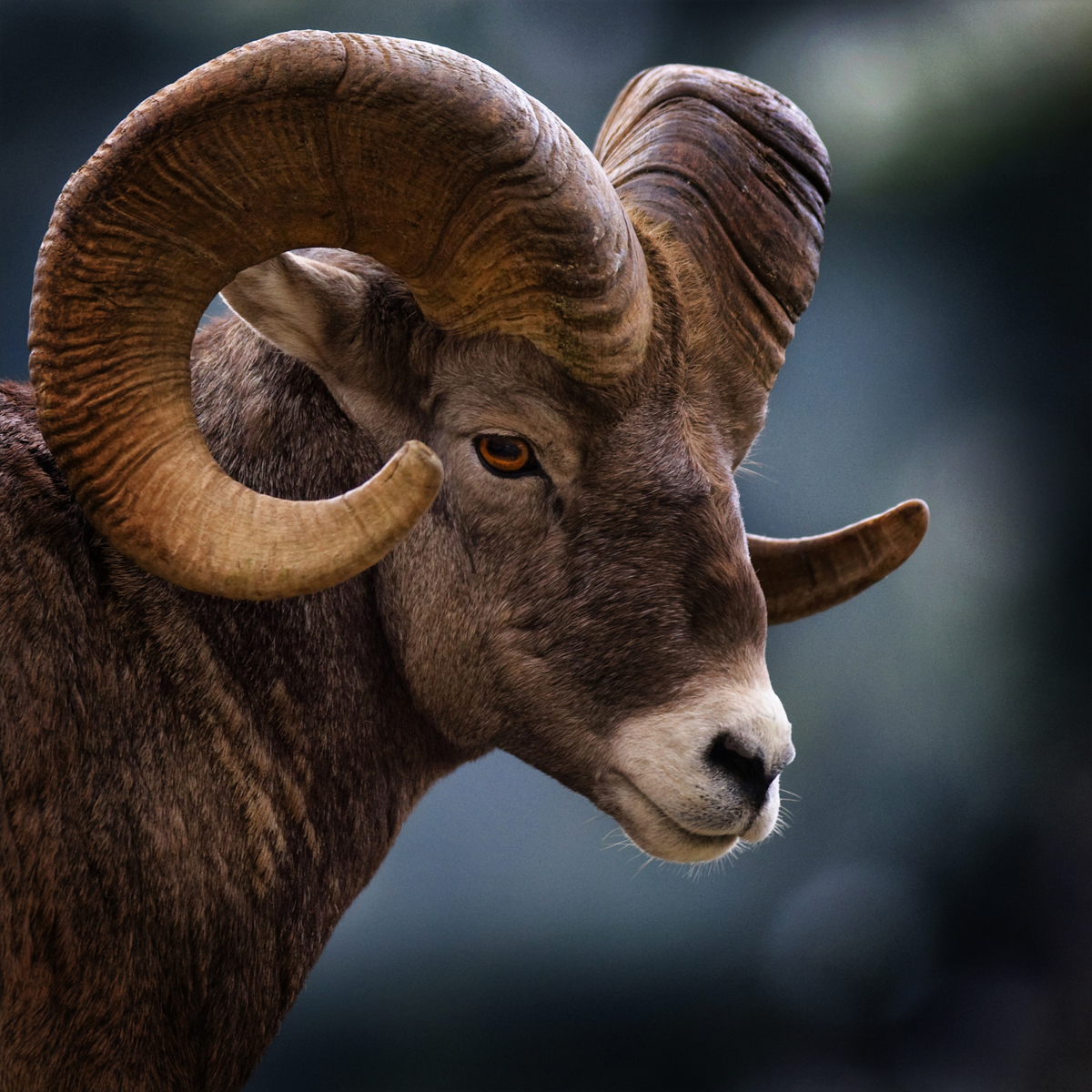
The largest population of Rocky Mountain bighorn sheep (Ovis canadensis canadensis) outside the Rocky Mountains lives within the CMRNWR.

Management of the refuge is subject to several management plans and court decisions. In 1983, the United States Court of Appeals for the Ninth Circuit ruled in Schwenke v. Secretary of the Interior, 720 F.2d 571, that wildlife should be given limited priority to the resources on the refuge, rather than livestock grazing. Executive Order 7509 established wildlife population limits, beyond which wildlife had no priority claim. The court also held that the refuge should be administered according to the National Wildlife Refuge System Administration Act of 1966 and not the Taylor Grazing Act of 1934. In April 1986, the National Park Service adopted an environmental impact statement and "decision of record" which established a resource management plan for the refuge. In 2009, the Ninth Circuit ruled in Silver Dollar Grazing Association v. U.S. Fish and Wildlife Service, No. 07-35612 (9th Cir., January 13, 2009) that habitat conditions could be used as a proxy for actual wildlife counts for purposes of meeting the conditions of Executive Order 7509.

The refuge is administered from FWS offices in Lewistown, Montana.

Fort Peck Reservoir, the fifth-largest man-made reservoir in the United States (by volume), backs up 134 miles (216 km) along the Missouri River. The reservoir is managed by the U.S. Army Corps of Engineers, and water levels in the lake are not part of the refuge's management plan.

The largest population of Rocky Mountain bighorn sheep outside the Rocky Mountains exist in the refuge. Significant populations of beaver, cougars, coyotes, mule deer, prairie dogs, porcupines, pronghorn, Rocky Mountain elk, and white-tailed deer exist within the refuge. Threatened species, endangered species, and species of concern in the refuge include the black-footed ferret, black-tailed prairie dog, burrowing owl, gray wolf, grizzly bear, least tern, mountain plover, northern leopard frog, pallid sturgeon, piping plover, greater sage-grouse, sicklefin chub, and sturgeon chub. The site also contains a large population of sharp-tailed grouse as well as approximately 235 other bird species. The refuge is home to 4,000 prairie elk, the largest remaining prairie elk herd in the United States. Two permittees have grazed bison as "domestic livestock" in a limited fashion, though their leases are mostly on adjacent lands.

== Visiting and access ==
Approximately 250,000 people visit the Russell National Wildlife Refuge each year, making it one of the most visited national wildlife refuges in the United States.

The U.S. Fish and Wildlife Service allows the public to hunt and fish in the refuge.

U.S. Highway 191 provides access to the western sections of the refuge. Montana Highway 24 passes along the eastern boundary, providing access to various wildlife stations located in the refuge. More than 680 miles (1,090 km) of mostly gravel and dirt roads provide access to about 80 percent of the refuge. This includes access to 135 miles of riverbank and lakeshore.

=== Fort Peck Interpretive Center ===
The Fort Peck Interpretive Center is the official visitor center for the Charles M. Russell National Wildlife Refuge in Fort Peck, Montana. Also known as the Fort Peck Interpretive Center and Museum, the Center contains an aquarium of native and game fish, stuffed specimens of local wildlife, and casts of area dinosaur fossils. Included among the fossil displays is a full cast of the Tyrannosaurus rex known as "Devil Rex", unearthed in the Russell National Wildlife Refuge in 1988. The Center also features exhibits about the construction of the Fort Peck Dam and the area's cultural history, and offers guided tours of the powerhouse. Other activities include Interpretive programs, theater presentations, amphitheater programs and nature hikes.

Constructed in 2004 and opened in 2005, the Center is a partnership between the U.S. Army Corps of Engineers and the U.S. Fish & Wildlife Service. It is a member of the Montana Dinosaur Trail.

== Notable fossil discoveries ==
In 1988, a Tyrannosaurus rex known as "Devil Rex" (MOR 555) was unearthed in the Russell National Wildlife Refuge. The specimen skeleton was approximately 46 percent complete and included the first complete T. rex forelimb. Doctoral candidate Mary Schweitzer found heme, a biological form of iron that makes up hemoglobin (the red pigment in blood), within some bones of the fossil. The fossil is now the centerpiece of the renovation dinosaur hall at the National Museum of Natural History in Washington, D.C.

In 2000, a Tyrannosaurus rex specimen known as "B-Rex" (MOR 1125) was unearthed at the Russel National Wildlife Refuge. Preserved soft tissue was found in the femur of the 70 million year old specimen. Protein sequencing of the material showed it to be collagen.

In November 2010, hunter David Bradt stumbled on an elasmosaur fossil in a canyon on the Russell National Wildlife Refuge. The specimen proved to be a new, short-necked species of elasmosaur, subsequently named Nakonanectes bradti.

Bug Creek Fossil Area (805 acres (326 ha)) was designated as a National Natural Landmark in 1966. It features abundant fossils of small, Cretaceous mammals.

== Bibliography ==
- Aarstad, Rich; Arguimbau, Ellen; Baumler, Ellen; Porsild, Charlene L.; and Shovers, Brian. Montana Place Names From Alzada to Zortman. Helena, Mont.: Montana Historical Society Press, 2009.
- Billington, David P. and Jackson, Donald C. Big Dams of the New Deal Era: A Confluence of Engineering and Politics. Norman, Okla.: University of Oklahoma Press, 2006.
- Brooks, Noah. The Story of the Lewis and Clark Expedition. Mineola, N.Y.: Dover Publications, 2004.
- Clawson, Roger and Shandera, Katherine A. Billings: The City and the People. Helena, Mont.: Farcountry Press, 1998.
- Fischer, Carol and Fischer, Hank. Montana Wildlife Viewing Guide. Helena, Mont.: Falcon, 1995.
- Fritz, Charles. Charles Fritz: 100 Paintings Illustrating the Lewis and Clark Journals. Helena, Mont.: Farcountry Press, 2009.
- Jones, Stephen R. and Cushman, Ruth Carol. A Field Guide to the North American Prairie. Boston: Houghton Mifflin, 2004.
- Lange, Robert E. "Supplemental Note on William Bratton." In Explorations Into the World of Lewis and Clark. Robert A. Saindon, ed. Great Falls, Mont.: Lewis and Clark Trail Heritage Foundation, 2003.
- Large, Arlen J. "Along the Trail: The In-House Honorifics of Lewis and Clark." In Explorations Into the World of Lewis and Clark. Robert A. Saindon, ed. Great Falls, Mont.: Lewis and Clark Trail Heritage Foundation, 2003.
- Larson, Peter L.; Carpenter, Kenneth (2008). Tyrannosaurus Rex, the Tyrant King. Bloomington, Ind.: Indiana University Press.
- Lewis, Meriwether and Clark, William. The Definitive Journals of the Lewis & Clark Expedition. Vol. 4. Gary E. Moulton, ed. Lincoln, Neb.: University of Nebraska Press, 2002.
- McRae, W.C. and Jewell, Judy. Montana. Berkeley, Calif.: Avalon Travel Pub., 2009.
- Robbins, Chuck. Great Places Montana: A Recreational Guide to Montana's Public Lands and Historic Places for Birding, Hiking, Photography, Fishing, Hunting, and Camping. Belgrade, Mont.: Wilderness Adventures Press, 2008.
- Rowles, Genevieve. Adventure Guide to Montana. Edison, N.J.: Hunter Pub., 2000.
- Schullery, Paul. Lewis and Clark Among the Grizzlies: Legend and Legacy in the American West. Guilford, Conn.: Falcon, 2002.
- Skarsten, Malvin Olai and Carriker, Robert C. George Drouillard: Hunter and Interpreter for Lewis and Clark and Fur Trader, 1807-1810. Lincoln, Neb.: University of Nebraska Press, 2005.
- U.S. Fish and Wildlife Service. Draft Comprehensive Conservation Plan and Environmental Impact Statement: Charles M. Russell National Wildlife Refuge and UL Bend National Wildlife Refuge, Montana. U.S. Department of the Interior. September 2010. Accessed 2012-04-27.
- Willis, David and Scalet, Charles. Introduction to Wildlife and Fisheries. New York: Macmillan, 2008.
