= Columbus, Montana =

- City
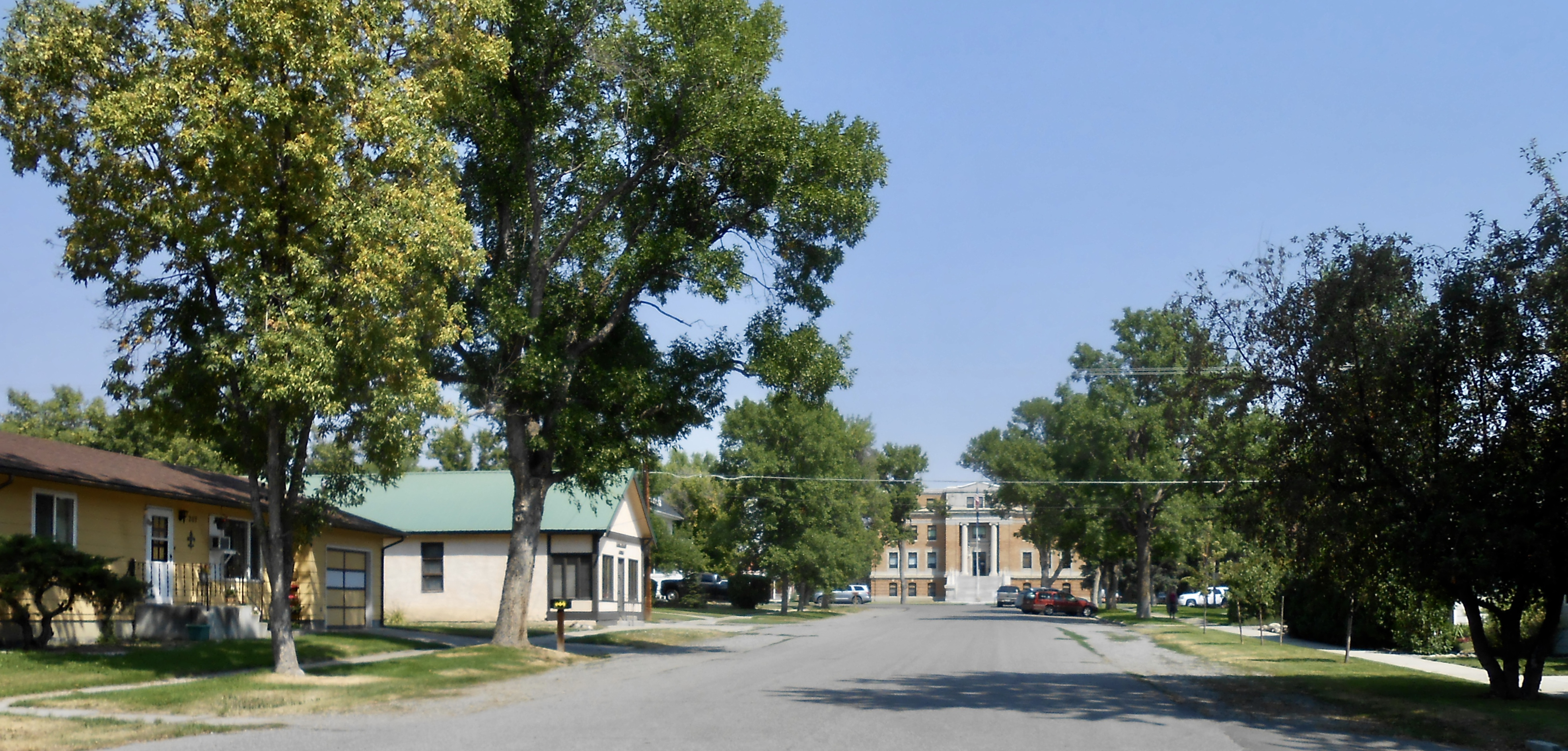
- The Stillwater County Courthouse in Columbus, as seen from the intersection of 4th Avenue and East 2nd Avenue North.

- Location of Columbus, Montana
- Coordinates: 45°38′05″N 109°14′45″W
- Country: United States
- State: Montana
- County: Stillwater

Government
  - Type: Mayor–council government
  - Mayor: Joe Morse

Area
  - Total: 1.37 sq mi (3.55 km^{2})
  - Land: 1.37 sq mi (3.55 km^{2})
  - Water: 0 sq mi (0.00 km^{2})
- Elevation: 3,580 ft (1,090 m)

Population (2020)
  - Total: 1,857
  - Density: 1,353.0/sq mi (522.38/km^{2})
- Time zone: UTC-7 (Mountain (MST))
  - Summer (DST): UTC-6 (MDT)
- ZIP Code: 59019
- Area code: 406
- FIPS code: 30-16825
- GNIS feature ID: 2413233
- Website: www.townofcolumbus.com

Columbus is a city in and the county seat of Stillwater County, Montana, United States. The population was 1,857 at the 2020 census.

== History ==
The community originated as a stagecoach station on the Yellowstone River.

The original name was Sheep Dip, then changed to Stillwater, but because of a Stillwater, Minnesota on the Northern Pacific Railway, the mail presented a problem. The name was ultimately changed to Columbus, Montana in 1893.

== Geography and climate ==
According to the United States Census Bureau, the town has a total area of 1.35 square miles (3.50 km^{2}), of which 1.32 square miles (3.42 km^{2}) is land and 0.03 square miles (0.08 km^{2}) is water.

Columbus is located between the Yellowstone River, the old Yellowstone Trail, Highway 10, and now Interstate 90.

The confluence of the Yellowstone River and Stillwater River is at Columbus.

According to the Köppen Climate Classification system, Columbus has a warm-summer humid continental climate, abbreviated "Dfb" on climate maps.

Climate data for Columbus, Montana, 1991–2020 normals, extremes 1930–present
Month	Jan	Feb	Mar	Apr	May	Jun	Jul	Aug	Sep	Oct	Nov	Dec	Year
Record high °F (°C)	68 (20)	79 (26)	83 (28)	90 (32)	96 (36)	102 (39)	109 (43)	106 (41)	102 (39)	92 (33)	79 (26)	71 (22)	109 (43)
Mean maximum °F (°C)	57.7 (14.3)	60.8 (16.0)	70.5 (21.4)	79.1 (26.2)	84.6 (29.2)	92.3 (33.5)	97.6 (36.4)	96.1 (35.6)	92.0 (33.3)	81.9 (27.7)	67.5 (19.7)	57.1 (13.9)	98.6 (37.0)
Mean daily maximum °F (°C)	36.8 (2.7)	40.3 (4.6)	50.5 (10.3)	58.0 (14.4)	66.8 (19.3)	75.9 (24.4)	85.4 (29.7)	84.1 (28.9)	74.2 (23.4)	60.0 (15.6)	46.4 (8.0)	36.6 (2.6)	59.6 (15.3)
Daily mean °F (°C)	23.4 (−4.8)	26.7 (−2.9)	35.6 (2.0)	43.1 (6.2)	52.0 (11.1)	60.4 (15.8)	67.7 (19.8)	65.9 (18.8)	56.7 (13.7)	44.7 (7.1)	32.6 (0.3)	23.7 (−4.6)	44.4 (6.9)
Mean daily minimum °F (°C)	10.0 (−12.2)	13.0 (−10.6)	20.6 (−6.3)	28.2 (−2.1)	37.2 (2.9)	44.9 (7.2)	50.0 (10.0)	47.7 (8.7)	39.2 (4.0)	29.4 (−1.4)	18.8 (−7.3)	10.7 (−11.8)	29.1 (−1.6)
Mean minimum °F (°C)	−16.0 (−26.7)	−8.4 (−22.4)	0.9 (−17.3)	15.5 (−9.2)	24.9 (−3.9)	35.2 (1.8)	42.8 (6.0)	39.0 (3.9)	28.3 (−2.1)	13.4 (−10.3)	−2.9 (−19.4)	−11.3 (−24.1)	−24.1 (−31.2)
Record low °F (°C)	−38 (−39)	−45 (−43)	−33 (−36)	−13 (−25)	9 (−13)	28 (−2)	34 (1)	31 (−1)	18 (−8)	−14 (−26)	−33 (−36)	−42 (−41)	−45 (−43)
Average precipitation inches (mm)	0.62 (16)	0.67 (17)	0.93 (24)	1.97 (50)	2.82 (72)	2.25 (57)	1.15 (29)	0.93 (24)	1.36 (35)	1.49 (38)	0.69 (18)	0.65 (17)	15.53 (397)
Average snowfall inches (cm)	7.0 (18)	8.8 (22)	7.7 (20)	4.5 (11)	0.5 (1.3)	0.0 (0.0)	0.0 (0.0)	0.0 (0.0)	0.2 (0.51)	3.8 (9.7)	5.9 (15)	9.2 (23)	47.6 (120.51)
Average precipitation days (≥ 0.01 in)	5.1	6.0	7.2	9.6	11.6	11.0	8.7	6.9	6.4	7.4	5.1	5.9	90.9
Average snowy days (≥ 0.1 in)	3.6	5.0	3.7	2.2	0.3	0.0	0.0	0.0	0.1	1.6	2.6	5.0	24.1
Source 1: NOAA
Source 2: National Weather Service

== Demographics ==
Historical population
Census	Pop.	Note	%±
1910	521		—
1920	987		89.4%
1930	834		−15.5%
1940	962		15.3%
1950	1,097		14.0%
1960	1,281		16.8%
1970	1,173		−8.4%
1980	1,439		22.7%
1990	1,573		9.3%
2000	1,748		11.1%
2010	1,893		8.3%
2020	1,857		−1.9%
U.S. Decennial Census

=== 2010 census ===
As of the census of 2010, there were 1,893 people, 767 households, and 517 families residing in the town. The population density was 1,434.1 inhabitants per square mile (553.7/km^{2}). There were 843 housing units at an average density of 638.6 per square mile (246.6/km^{2}). The racial makeup of the town was 96.5% White, 0.1% African American, 0.6% Native American, 0.4% Asian, 0.4% from other races, and 2.1% from two or more races. Hispanic or Latino of any race were 2.7% of the population.

There were 767 households, of which 33.9% had children under the age of 18 living with them, 55.9% were married couples living together, 9.0% had a female householder with no husband present, 2.5% had a male householder with no wife present, and 32.6% were non-families. 28.3% of all households were made up of individuals, and 13.8% had someone living alone who was 65 years of age or older. The average household size was 2.41 and the average family size was 2.97.

The median age in the town was 40.4 years. 26% of residents were under the age of 18; 6.1% were between the ages of 18 and 24; 23.8% were from 25 to 44; 27.4% were from 45 to 64; and 16.7% were 65 years of age or older. The gender makeup of the town was 48.5% male and 51.5% female.

=== 2000 census ===
As of the census of 2000, there were 1,748 people, 709 households, and 455 families residing in the town. The population density was 1,449.6 inhabitants per square mile (559.7/km^{2}). There were 762 housing units at an average density of 631.9 per square mile (244.0/km^{2}). The racial makeup of the town was 96.62% White, 0.23% African American, 1.26% Native American, 0.11% Asian, 0.11% from other races, and 1.66% from two or more races. Hispanic or Latino of any race were 1.60% of the population.

There were 709 households, out of which 33.3% had children under the age of 18 living with them, 54.0% were married couples living together, 7.1% had a female householder with no husband present, and 35.7% were non-families. 31.0% of all households were made up of individuals, and 12.6% had someone living alone who was 65 years of age or older. The average household size was 2.37 and the average family size was 2.98.

In the town, the population was spread out, with 26.7% under the age of 18, 5.9% from 18 to 24, 28.2% from 25 to 44, 22.5% from 45 to 64, and 16.6% who were 65 years of age or older. The median age was 38 years. For every 100 females there were 97.3 males. For every 100 females age 18 and over, there were 91.5 males.

The median income for a household in the town was $33,750, and the median income for a family was $46,103. Males had a median income of $37,750 versus $20,417 for females. The per capita income for the town was $17,689. About 9.8% of families and 13.6% of the population were below the poverty line, including 15.6% of those under age 18 and 15.7% of those age 65 or over.

== Government ==
Columbus has a mayor and city council, which is represented by three wards with two council members each. As of 2026, the Mayor is Joe Morse.

== Arts and Culture ==
The Museum of the Beartooths is a history museum located in Columbus. They feature artifacts and replicas of life in the Stillwater area.

Having both the Yellowstone River and the Stillwater River just outside of town, fishing is a popular activity.

Stillwater County Library is a public library which serves the area.

== Infrastructure ==
Woltermann Memorial Airport is a public use airport located southeast of town.

The 100 kW solar array at the Stillwater Mining Company smelter was the first “behind-the-meter” industrial scale solar installation project in Montana.

== Education ==
Columbus Public Schools educates students from kindergarten through 12th grade. Columbus High School's team name is the Cougars.

== Media ==
The Stillwater County News is a newspaper serving the area. It is printed weekly and also available online.

The radio station KMTJ is licensed in Columbus. The town receives stations from the wider Billings area.

== Notable people ==
- Annie Duke, professional poker player, lived here with her husband.
- Dwan Edwards, professional football player, attended high school here.
- William Thomas Hamilton, known as Wildcat Bill, a 19th-century frontiersman, scout, and author.
- Jack H. Vaughn, Ambassador to Panama and Colombia, and Director of the Peace Corps
