= Absarokee, Montana =

- CDP
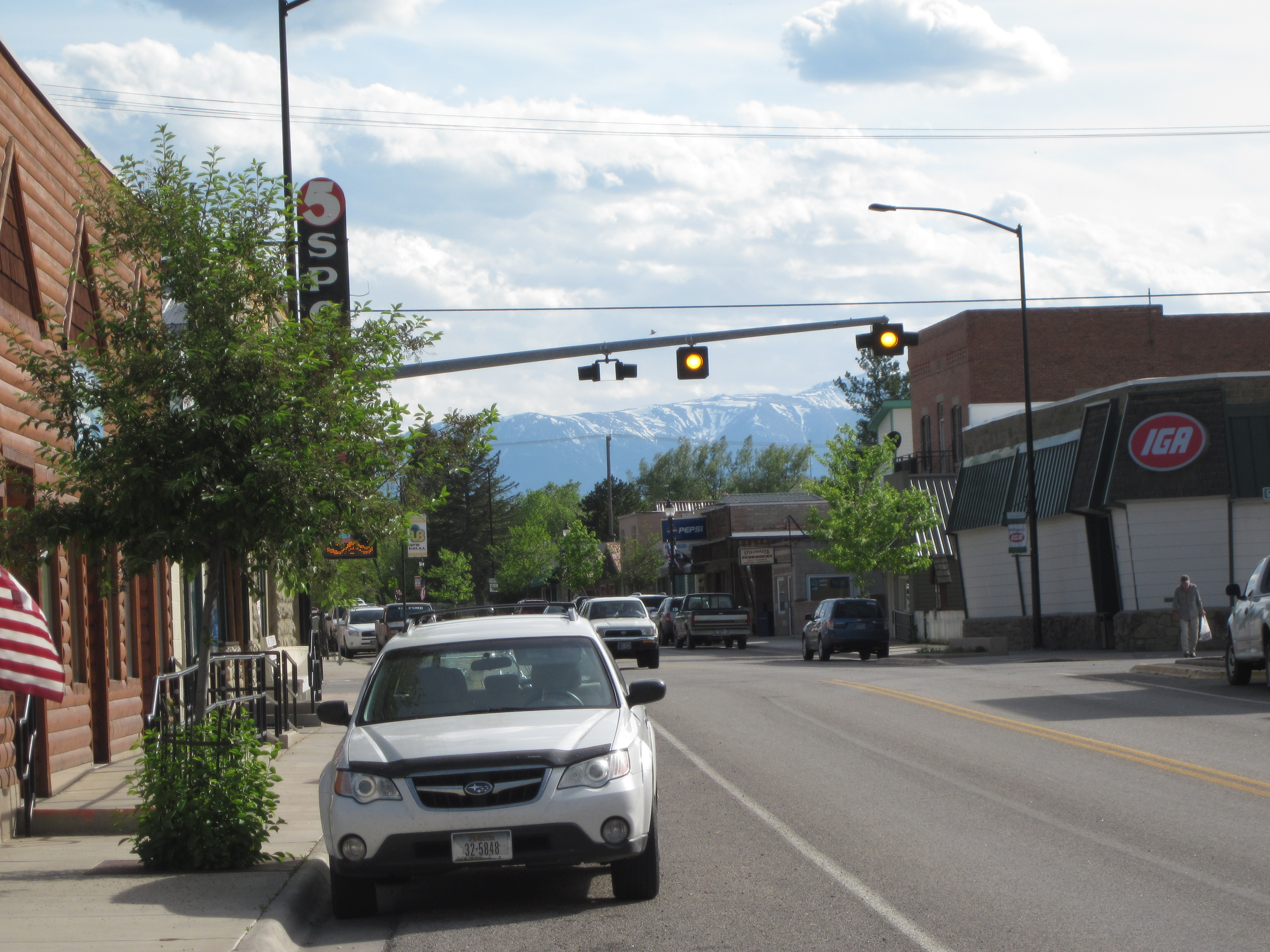
- Looking south toward the Beartooth Mountains

- Location of Absarokee, Montana
- Coordinates: 45°31′27″N 109°26′50″W
- Country: United States
- State: Montana
- County: Stillwater

Area
  - Total: 2.15 sq mi (5.57 km^{2})
  - Land: 2.14 sq mi (5.54 km^{2})
  - Water: 0.0077 sq mi (0.02 km^{2})
- Elevation: 4,036 ft (1,230 m)

Population (2020)
  - Total: 1,000
  - Density: 467.1/sq mi (180.34/km^{2})
- Time zone: UTC−7 (Mountain (MST))
  - Summer (DST): UTC−6 (MDT)
- ZIP code: 59001
- Area code: 406
- FIPS code: 30-00175
- GNIS feature ID: 2407693

Absarokee is a census-designated place (CDP) in Stillwater County, Montana, United States, approximately 14 miles (23 km) south of Columbus on Highway 78. It is named after the Crow Indians who formerly inhabited the land. The population was 1,000 at the 2020 census. The Stillwater Mine, operated by the Stillwater Mining Company, is located near Absarokee.

== Name ==
The name Absarokee is derived from Apsáalookěi, the name given to the Crow Indian Tribe by the related Hidatsa people with Apsáa meaning "large-beaked bird" and lookěi meaning "children". Apsáalookěi thus literally means "children of the large-beaked bird". (The name "Crow" comes from the French gens du corbeaux or "people of the crows" as Apsáalookěi was translated by French fur traders in 1743.) The name was chosen by Absarokee-founder Sever T. Simonson who believed it meant "our people". It is widely believed that the difference in spelling of Absarokee from the nearby Absaroka Range is a result of the poor penmanship of an early settler whose final "a" in the name was mistaken for "ee". Though pronounced "Ub-ZOR-kee" in modern parlance, Eli Ricker in one of his "Indian Interviews" from 1903-1919 ends a record of an interview with Frank S. Shively, Assistant Clerk at Crow Agency, with "Absarokee Ab-sar'-o-kee".

== History ==
Absarokee was founded just north of the Second Crow Agency (sometimes referred to as the Absaroka Agency) in 1892. The Crow Agency was the headquarters of the Crow Tribe's reservation, which was established by the Treaty of Fort Laramie (1868). That original reservation extended to more than 35 million acres with the first Crow Agency located at Fort Parker near modern Livingston, Montana in 1869.

As miners encroached, the reservation was reduced to 8 million acres in 1875 with a location south of modern Absarokee established as Second Crow Agency (1875-1884). It was during this time that the Crow were forced to give up nomadic free lifestyles to one totally under the control of the US government. They were not allowed to leave the reservation, bison was replaced with US issued beef rations, and the tribe was hit by several measles and scarlet fever epidemics. Finally, by 1884 further miner encroachment led to the creation of the third and current Crow Agency 60 miles SE of Billings on the Little Bighorn River. Most of the Absaroka Agency Fort was destroyed in a fire in 1891.

With the Homestead Acts of the 1860s and the westward expansion of the railroad, more settlers came to Montana. Not until October 15, 1892, did the federal government through a Benjamin Harrison proclamation open the land around Absarokee for settlement. It was part of a 1.8 million-acre land cession agreed to by Crow tribal leaders two years earlier after bowing to political pressure. Eleven days earlier on October 4, Sever Simonson and his family had arrived and established squatter's rights at the confluence of the Stillwater and East Rosebud Rivers.

Simonson and his nephew, Oliver H. Hovda, built a log hotel and together established a trading post (later the Absarokee Cooperative Trading Co.). This was followed by a saloon, livery stable, and blacksmith shop. A post office was established December 16, 1892 in Simonson's home, where he served as Absarokee's postmaster. The two-story home of Hovda, known as the Big Yellow House, built in 1904 by an area rancher, Jacob Wagner, is located on Absarokee's main street (Woodard Ave.) and is on the National Register of Historic Places list.

Absarokee was affected by the 2022 Montana floods when the Stillwater River flooded.

== Geography ==
Absarokee is located in a valley of the Beartooth Mountains foothills. According to the United States Census Bureau, the CDP has a total area of 2.0 square miles (5.2 km^{2}), all land. It is situated in the Rosebud River watershed, approximately three miles north of the confluence of the East Rosebud River, West Rosebud River, and Butcher Creek, and just south of the confluence of the created Rosebud River and the Stillwater River.

=== Climate ===
The climatic type is dominated by the winter season, a long, bitterly cold period with short, clear days, relatively little precipitation mostly in the form of snow, and low humidity.

Climate data for Absarokee/Columbus, Montana (1981–2010)
| Month | Jan | Feb | Mar | Apr | May | Jun | Jul | Aug | Sep | Oct | Nov | Dec | Year |
|---|---|---|---|---|---|---|---|---|---|---|---|---|---|
| Record high °F (°C) | 66 (19) | 72 (22) | 83 (28) | 87 (31) | 94 (34) | 101 (38) | 106 (41) | 101 (38) | 99 (37) | 92 (33) | 76 (24) | 67 (19) | 106 (41) |
| Mean daily maximum °F (°C) | 38.9 (3.8) | 42.8 (6.0) | 52.0 (11.1) | 60.8 (16.0) | 69.7 (20.9) | 78.3 (25.7) | 87.2 (30.7) | 85.9 (29.9) | 75.3 (24.1) | 62.2 (16.8) | 47.1 (8.4) | 37.0 (2.8) | 61.4 (16.3) |
| Mean daily minimum °F (°C) | 12.3 (−10.9) | 15.6 (−9.1) | 23.7 (−4.6) | 31.1 (−0.5) | 39.7 (4.3) | 47.3 (8.5) | 52.6 (11.4) | 50.4 (10.2) | 41.3 (5.2) | 31.9 (−0.1) | 21.5 (−5.8) | 11.9 (−11.2) | 31.6 (−0.2) |
| Record low °F (°C) | −36 (−38) | −35 (−37) | −27 (−33) | −1 (−18) | 16 (−9) | 28 (−2) | 35 (2) | 31 (−1) | 18 (−8) | −9 (−23) | −22 (−30) | −42 (−41) | −42 (−41) |
| Average precipitation inches (mm) | 0.58 (15) | 0.64 (16) | 1.02 (26) | 1.89 (48) | 2.71 (69) | 2.21 (56) | 1.23 (31) | 0.89 (23) | 1.23 (31) | 1.30 (33) | 0.62 (16) | 0.56 (14) | 14.89 (378) |
| Average snowfall inches (cm) | 5.5 (14) | 6.0 (15) | 6.7 (17) | 3.2 (8.1) | 1.6 (4.1) | 0.0 (0.0) | 0.0 (0.0) | 0.0 (0.0) | 0.5 (1.3) | 2.7 (6.9) | 3.7 (9.4) | 5.6 (14) | 35.6 (90) |
| Average precipitation days (≥ 0.01 in) | 4.6 | 4.9 | 7.0 | 8.8 | 10.7 | 10.3 | 7.7 | 6.2 | 5.6 | 5.9 | 4.5 | 5.3 | 81.5 |
| Average snowy days (≥ 0.1 in) | 2.9 | 3.6 | 3.0 | 1.5 | 0.4 | 0 | 0 | 0 | 0.1 | 1.0 | 1.7 | 3.4 | 17.6 |
Source: NOAA

== Demographics ==
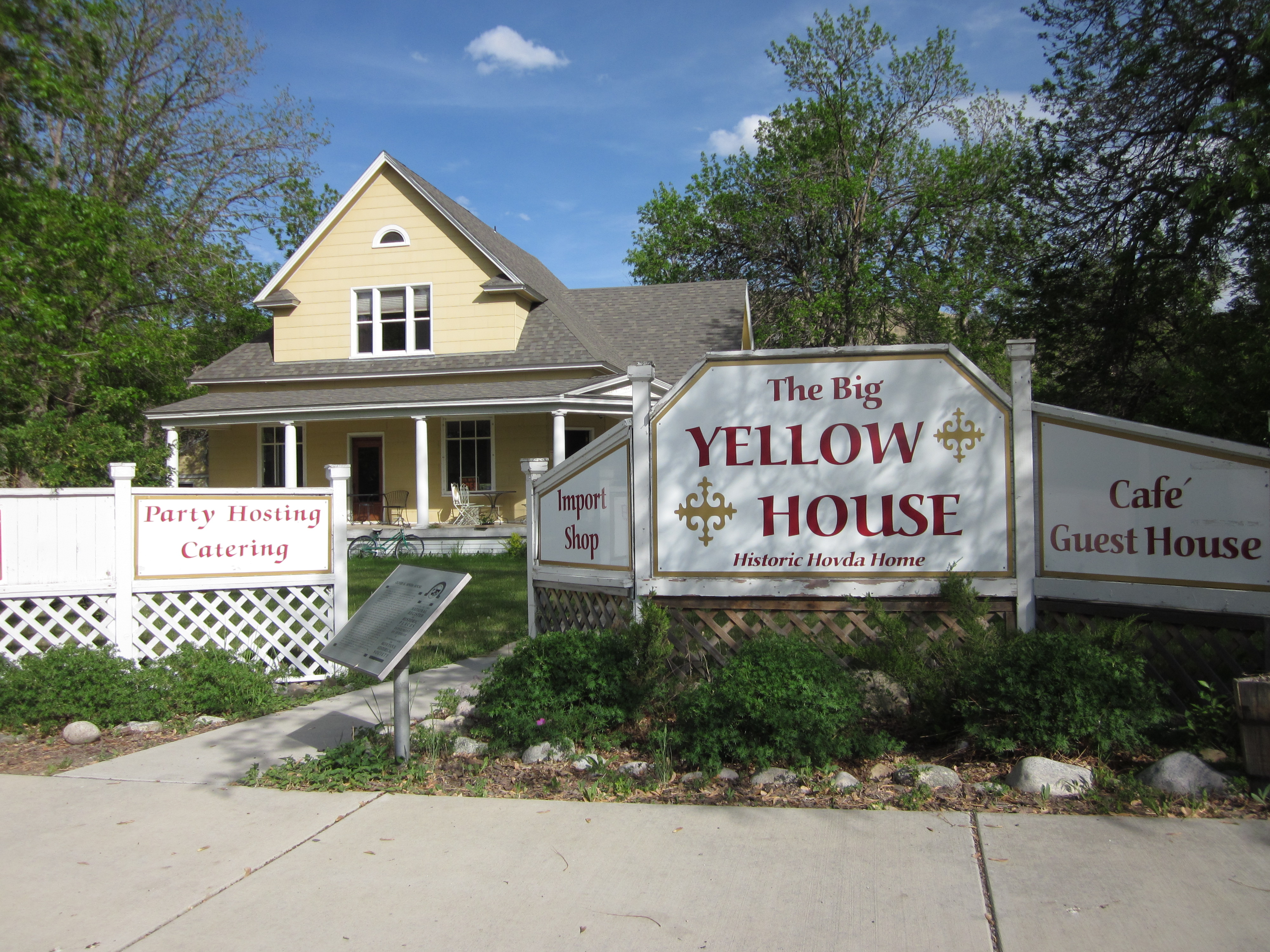
The Big Yellow House is listed on the National Register of Historic Places

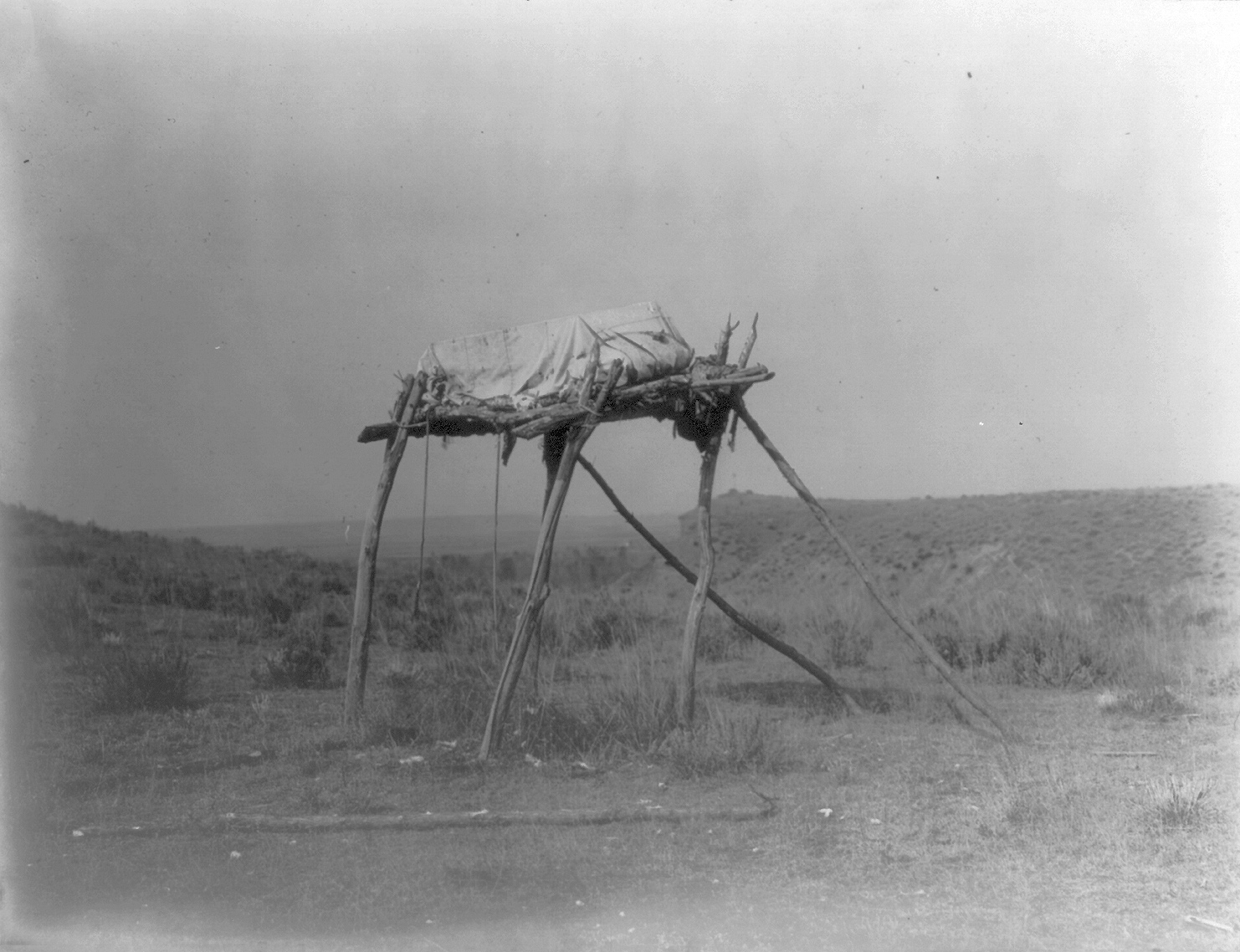
Absarokee burial

Historical population
| Census | Pop. | Note | %± |
|---|---|---|---|
| 2000 | 1,234 | | — |
| 2010 | 1,150 | | −6.8% |
| 2020 | 1,000 | | −13.0% |
U.S. Decennial Census

As of the census of 2000, there were 1,234 people, 499 households, and 343 families residing in the CDP. The population density was 608.1 inhabitants per square mile (234.8/km^{2}). There were 550 housing units at an average density of 271.0 per square mile (104.6/km^{2}). The racial makeup of the CDP was 97.24% White, 0.08% African American, 0.08% Native American, 0.16% Asian, 1.54% from other races, and 0.89% from two or more races. Hispanic or Latino of any race were 2.51% of the population.

There were 499 households, out of which 34.5% had children under the age of 18 living with them, 60.3% were married couples living together, 5.8% had a female householder with no husband present, and 31.1% were non-families. 26.9% of all households were made up of individuals, and 13.6% had someone living alone who was 65 years of age or older. The average household size was 2.45 and the average family size was 3.01.

In the CDP, the population was spread out, with 27.6% under the age of 18, 4.9% from 18 to 24, 27.6% from 25 to 44, 22.9% from 45 to 64, and 17.0% who were 65 years of age or older. The median age was 40 years. For every 100 females there were 93.7 males. For every 100 females age 18 and over, there were 95.0 males.

The median income for a household in the CDP was $43,676, and the median income for a family was $52,708. Males had a median income of $47,404 versus $19,545 for females. The per capita income for the CDP was $20,677. About 4.2% of families and 7.1% of the population were below the poverty line, including 8.0% of those under age 18 and 7.0% of those age 65 or over.

The nearby Stillwater Mine has a great effect on the population of the area. Although the population remains relatively constant with a slight increase, mining families are generally more transient than the local farming community so a slight change around town and especially at the schools is ever present.

== Education ==
Absarokee has two school locations. The elementary school is located on the south side of town in the former high school. Two older buildings on the campus are no longer used for educational purposes. The new high school (1989) is shared by both the junior high school and high school students.

Absarokee High School is a class C school (less than 108 students) which helps determine athletic competitions. The most notable difference in class C schools is that they play eight-man football, which is basically eleven-man football with no tackles and one split-end instead of two wide receivers.

Absarokee's sport teams are called the Huskies and the school colors are orange and black.

== Media ==
The Stillwater County News is a newspaper serving the area. It is printed weekly and also available online.

The town receives radio and television from the wider Billings area.
