= List of people from Montana =

State flag of Montana

Location of Montana in the United States

Montana /mɒnˈtænə/ is a state in the Western United States. The western third of Montana contains numerous mountain ranges. Smaller, "island ranges" are found in the central third of the state, for a total of 77 named ranges of the Rocky Mountains. This geographical fact is reflected in the state's name, derived from the Spanish word montaña (mountain). Montana has several nicknames, including "The Treasure State" and "Big Sky Country", and slogans that include "Land of the Shining Mountains" and more recently, "The Last Best Place". The state ranks fourth in area, but 44th in population, and accordingly has the third-lowest population density in the United States. The economy is primarily based on services, with ranching, wheat farming, oil and coal mining in the east, and lumber, tourism, and hard rock mining in the west. Millions of tourists annually visit Glacier National Park, the Little Bighorn Battlefield National Monument, and three of the five entrances to Yellowstone National Park.

== Academics ==
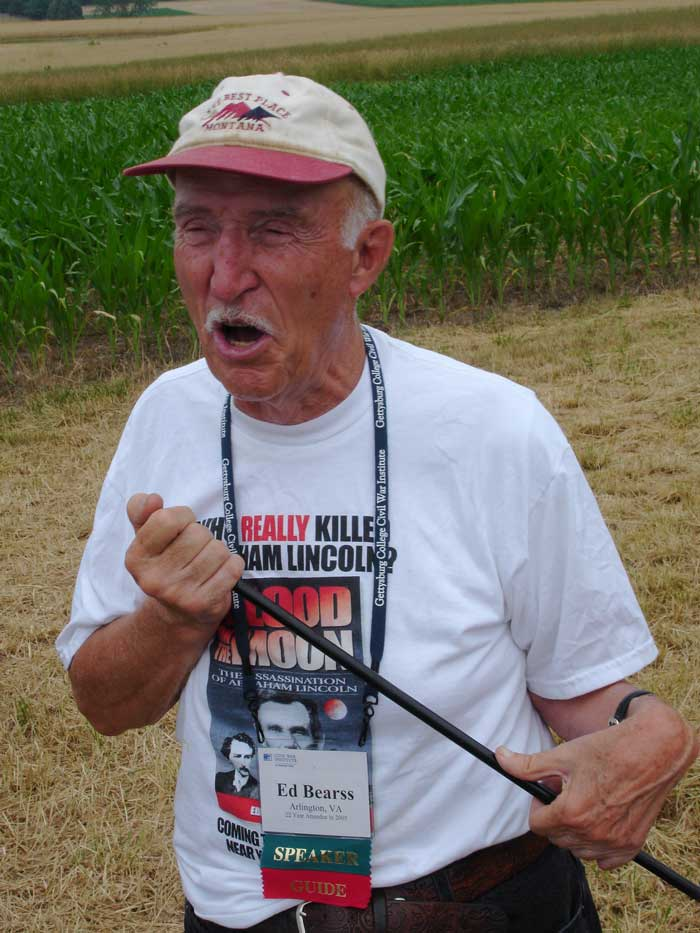
Ed Bearss narrating history in a field

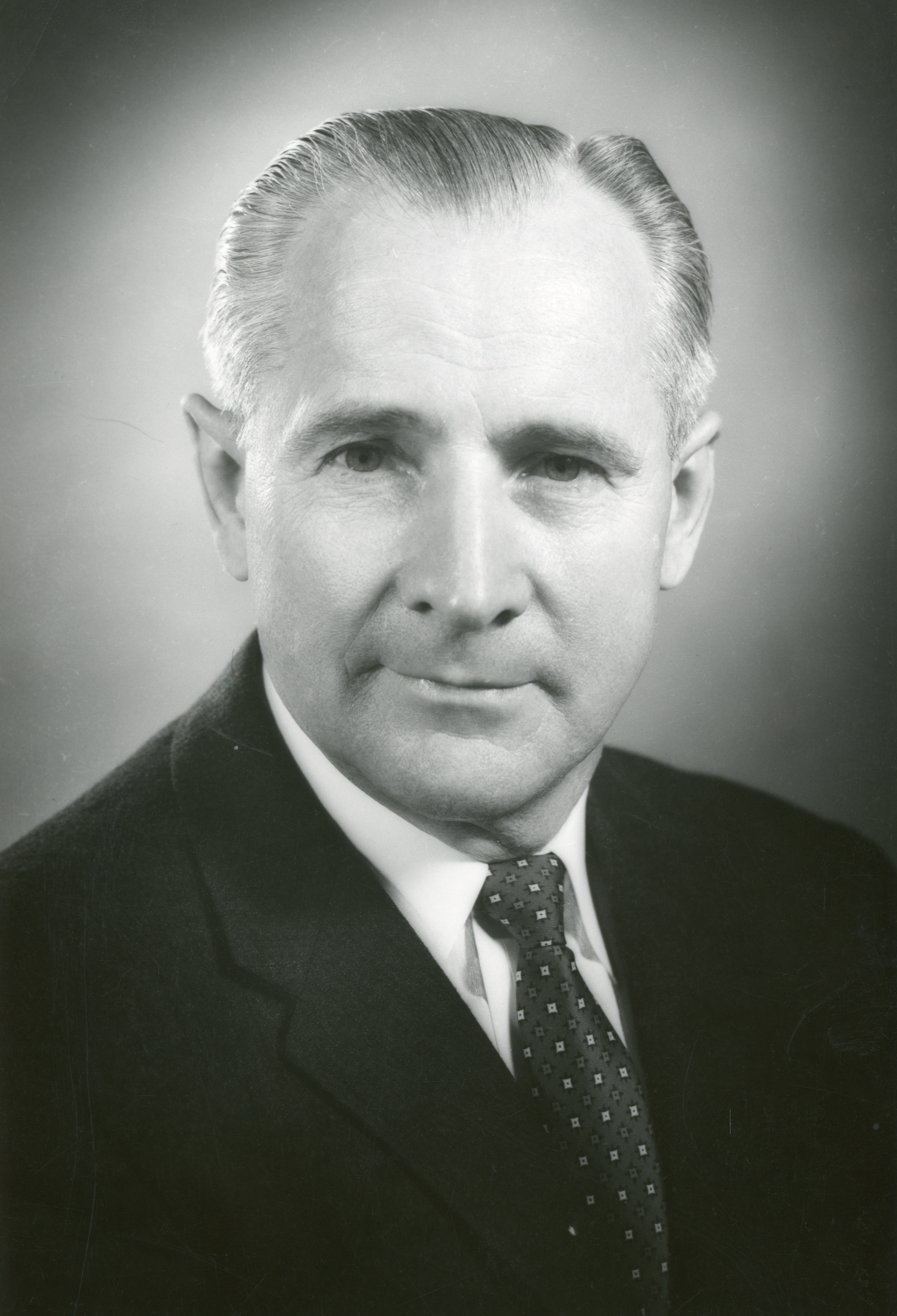
Roland Renne while President of Montana State College in 1960

Academics from Montana
Name	Lifetime	Montana connection	Comments	Refs
Stephen E. Ambrose	1936–2002	Lived in Helena during retirement	Professor; historian; biographer	
Ed Bearss	1923–2020	Born in Billings	Historian specializing in the American Civil War and World War II; chief historian of the National Park Service (1981–1994); National Park Service Historian Emeritus	
Judy Blunt	1954–present	Born near Malta; attended college in and lives in Missoula	Memoirist; associate professor at the University of Montana	
Dan Flores	1948–present	Lives in Missoula	Historian and writer on the Western United States; professor and A.B. Hammond Chair in Western History at the University of Montana	
Malcolm Knowles	1913–1997	Born in Livingston	Educator noted for the adoption of the theory of andragogy	
Norman Maclean	1902–1990	Moved to Missoula in 1909	Author; scholar; dean of students and William Rainey Harper Professor of English at the University of Chicago	
Janine Pease	1949–present	Lives on the Crow Indian Reservation	Founded Little Big Horn College	
Roland Renne	1905–1989	President of Montana State College (1943–1964) in Bozeman	Agricultural economics professor; active in Washington, D.C., and overseas agricultural economics work; Democratic candidate for governor of Montana (1964)	
Clyde Summers	1918–2010	Born	Labor lawyer and law professor at the University of Pennsylvania Law School	
Lester Thurow	1938–2016	Born in Livingston	Rhodes Scholar; economist; former dean of the MIT Sloan School of Management; author of numerous bestsellers on economics; columnist	
K. Ross Toole	1920–1981	Born, raised and college student in Missoula; lived in Missoula and Red Lodge	Historian; history writer; A.B. Hammond Professor of Western History at the University of Montana	
James Welch	1940–2003	Born in Browning; attended college and lived in Missoula	Poet; history writer; taught at the University of Washington, Cornell University, and the University of Montana; 1997 recipient of the Lifetime Achievement Award from the Native Writers' Circle of the Americas	

== Artists ==
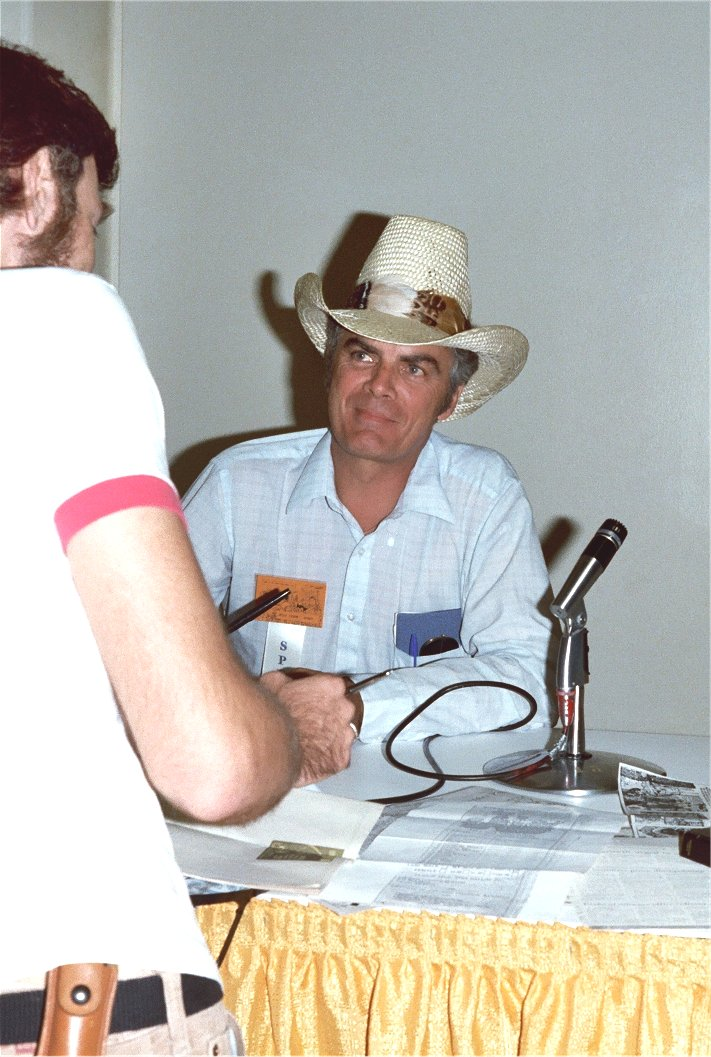
Cartoonist Stan Lynde at the 1982 San Diego Comic Con

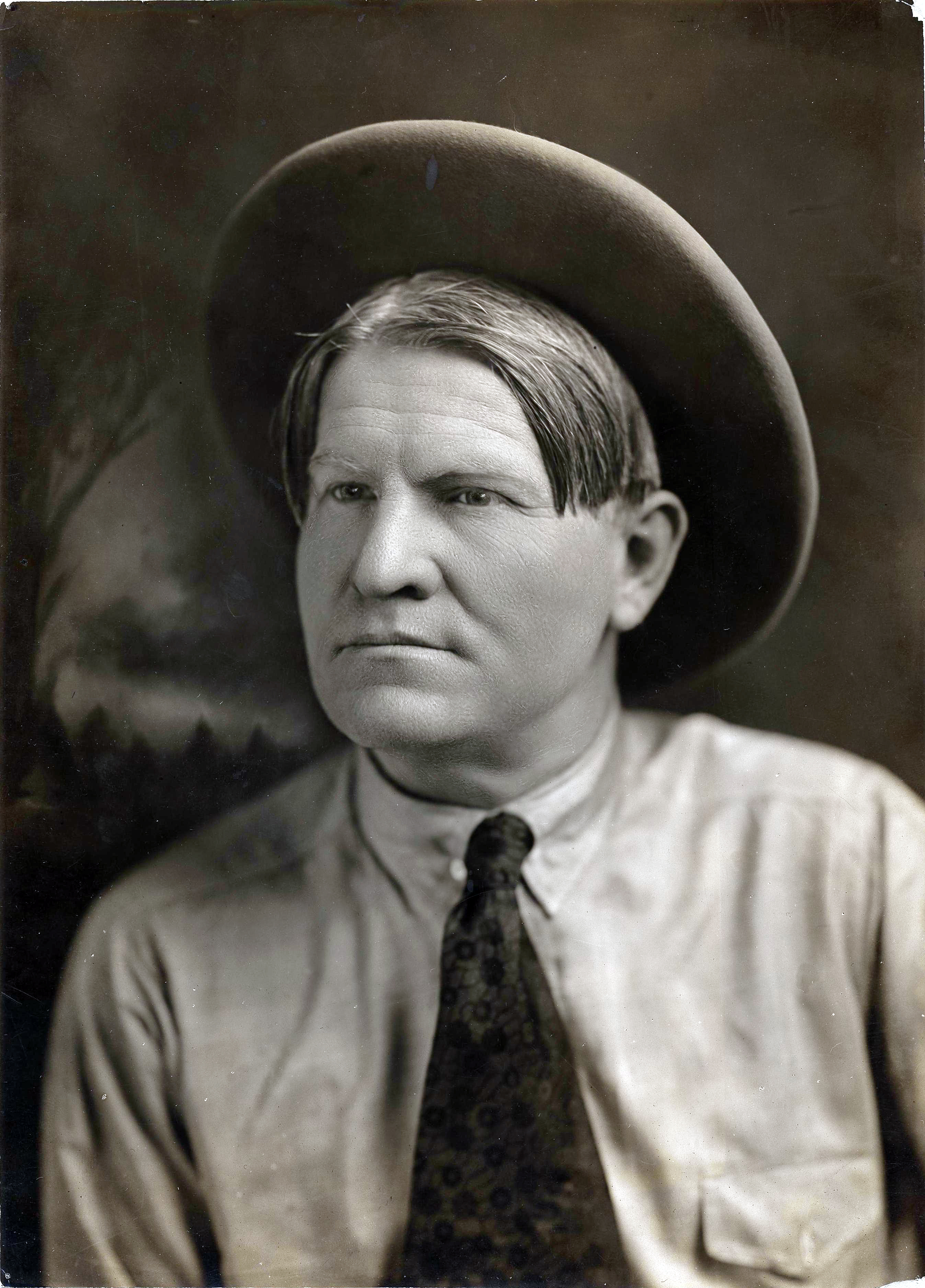
Western painter Charles Marion Russell

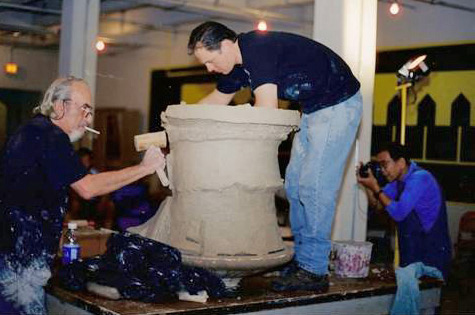
John Balistreri (right) assisting Peter Voulkos (left)

Artists from Montana
Name	Lifetime	Montana connection	Comments	Refs
Brad Adkins	1973–present	Born in Kalispell	Artist and curator	
Anne Appleby	1954–present	Lives and works part time in Born in Jefferson City	Abstract color field/landscape painter	
Rudy Autio	1926–2007	Born in Butte; attended college in Bozeman; lived and taught in Missoula	Sculptor and ceramicist; professor of ceramics	
John E. Buck	1946–present	Lives part-time in Bozeman	Sculptor and printmaker; married to fellow sculptor Deborah Butterfield	
Deborah Butterfield	1949–present	Lives part-time in Bozeman	Sculptor who makes horses out of found objects; married to fellow sculptor John E. Buck	
Russell Chatham	1939–2019	Lives near Livingston	Painter; lithographer; writer; restaurateur	
F. Y. Cory	1877–1972	Lived in Helena and on a ranch near Canyon Ferry Lake	Artist and illustrator	
William Cumming	1917–2010	Born in Kalispell	Artist; a founder of the Northwest School	
Bob DeWeese	1920–1990	Lived in Bozeman and taught at Montana State University	Received the 1995 Montana Governor's Award for the Arts	
Gennie DeWeese	1921–2007	Lived in Bozeman	Painter, 1995 received the Montana Governor's Award for the Arts	
Monte Dolack	1950–present	Born in Great Falls; lives in Missoula	Lithographer; painter; poster artist; watercolorist; one of Montana's most popular and widely known contemporary graphic artists; known for whimsical images of animals (trout swimming in a bathtub, elk with their antlers on fire, etc.)	
Malcolm Hancock	1936–1993	Lived and died in Great Falls	Satirical cartoonist who used the pen name "Mal"	
Ethel Hays	1892–1989	Born in and raised in Billings	Syndicated cartoonist specializing in flapper-themed comic strips	
Will James	1892–1942	Lived his later adult years at Pryor Creek and in Billings	Western artist; author; won the Newbery Medal in 1927	
Frank Bird Linderman	1869–1938	Lived in Sheridan, Demersville (now Kalispell), Helena, Butte, and Flathead Lake	Western sculptor and writer; Native American ally; Montana State Representative (1903–1905); Montana Assistant Secretary of State (1905–1907)	
Stan Lynde	1931–2013	Born in Billings; raised on sheep ranch near Lodge Grass; attended college in Missoula; lived in last years of his life Helena	Cartoonist who drew the comic strips Rick O'Shay and Latigo; western mystery novelist	
Edgar Samuel Paxson	1852–1919	Moved to Montana at age 20; lived in Deer Lodge, Butte, and Missoula	19th-century realist painter	
J. K. Ralston	1896–1987	Born in Choteau; lived in Helena, Dawson County, and Billings	Western painter of the American Old West whose primary topics were the American West and images of cowboys and American Indians	
Kevin Red Star	1943–present	Born and raised on the Crow Indian Reservation; attended college in Bozeman and Billings; lives in Lodge Grass	Contemporary Native artist; some of his work is in the Smithsonian Institution	
Winold Reiss	1886–1953	Spent significant time in Montana; ashes spread by the Blackfeet along the eastern edge of Glacier National Park	Painter; made over 250 paintings of Native Americans, especially the Blackfeet	
Charles Marion "C.M." Russell	1864–1926	Moved to Montana at age 16; lived in Cascade, and Great Falls	Western painter; storyteller; author; primary topics were the American Old West and images of cowboys and American Indians	
Robert Scriver	1914–1999	Born on the Blackfeet Reservation; lived near Glacier National Park	Sculptor of western themes	
Peter Voulkos	1924–2002	Born, raised, and attended college in Bozeman; lived in Helena	Abstract expressionist ceramicist	

=== Photographers ===
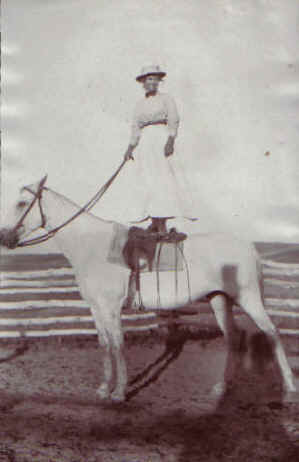
Evelyn Cameron standing on a horse, circa 1915

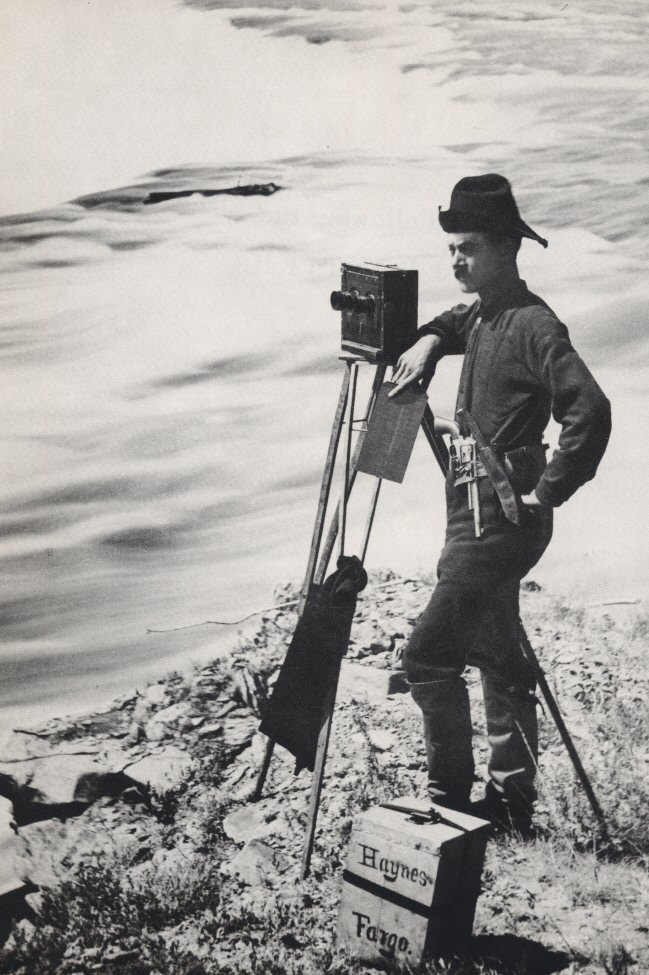
Frank Jay Haynes at Fort Benton, Montana, 1876

Photographers from Montana
Name	Lifetime	Montana connection	Comments	Refs
Evelyn Cameron	1868–1928	Lived in Terry	Photographer; moved to Terry in the late 19th century with her naturalist husband Ewen; together they took pictures of Montana prairie life	
Frank Jay Haynes	1853–1921	Spent extensive time working in and photographing Montana	Photographer; publisher; entrepreneur; played a major role in documenting the settlement and early history of the Northwest through photographs; official photographer of the Northern Pacific Railway and Yellowstone National Park; operated early transportation concessions in the park from the West Yellowstone area	
William Henry Jackson	1843–1942	Spent extensive time photographing Montana, especially the Yellowstone region	Painter; Civil War and geological survey photographer; explorer of the American West; obtained the first photographs of Fort Ellis and settlements and geological features in the Paradise Valley along the Yellowstone River (1871)	
Robert C. Lautman	1923–2009	Born in Butte; attended college in Bozeman	Architectural photographer with extensive portfolio of buildings of national (U.S.) importance	
Albert Schlechten	1876–1961	Photographer in Bozeman and Anaconda	With his brother Alfred, purchased the Bozeman photography business of Grant and Tippet, which was renamed "Schlechten Brothers"; later went into farming; then owned a photography studio in Anaconda; made large format camera series of photos of Yellowstone National Park	
Alfred Schlechten	1877–1970	Photographer in Bozeman, Montana	With his brother Albert, purchased the Bozeman photography business of Grant and Tippet, which was renamed "Schlechten Brothers"; operated a solo portrait studio (1900–1940s)	
Chris Schlechten	19??–197?	Photographer in Bozeman, Montana	Son of Alfred Schlechten; created a spoof college annual at Montana State College (1933); ran a studio in West Yellowstone, Montana, and conducted extensive photography of Yellowstone National Park; took over Schlechten Brothers studio in the 1940s	

== Athletes ==
Montanans participate in a wide variety of sports, including baseball, basketball, boxing, cycling, football, golf, rodeo, figure skating, skiing, and wrestling.

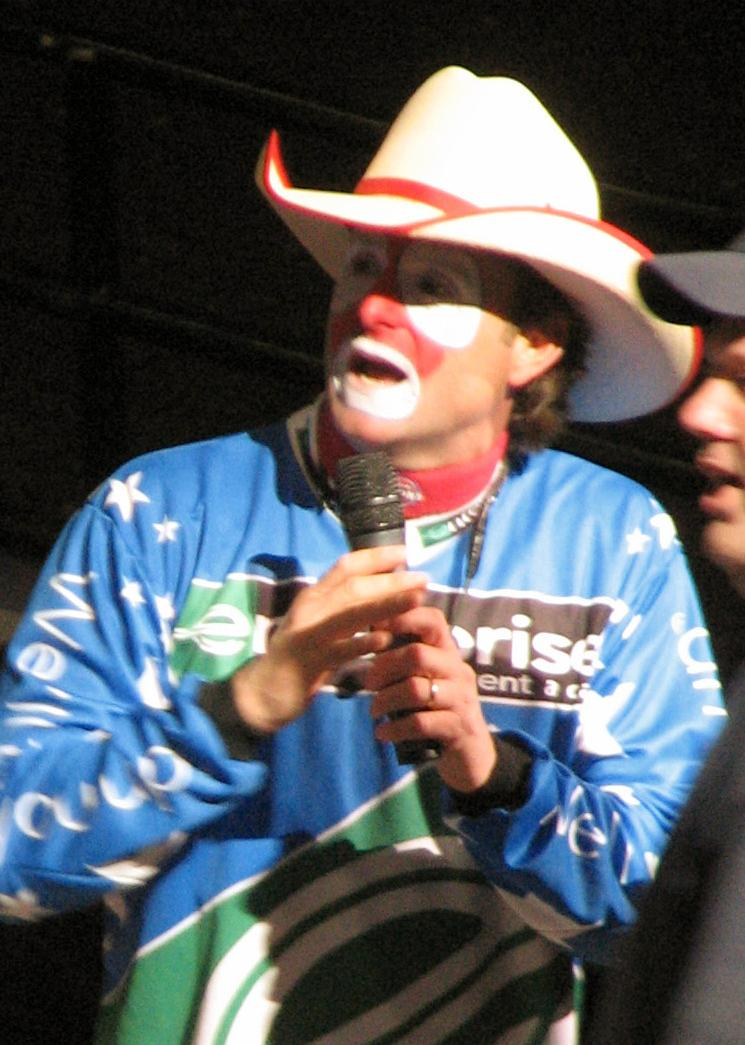
Rodeo clown Flint Rasmussen in 2007

Athletes from Montana
Name	Lifetime	Montana connection	Comments	Refs
Gene Davis	1945–present	Born and raised in Missoula	Olympic freestyle wrestler; bronze medalist at 1976 Summer Olympics	
Pat Donovan	1953–present	Attended high school in Helena	National Football League left tackle (1975–1983); four-time Pro Bowler; played in three Super Bowls, winning one	
Todd Foster	1967–present	Born in Great Falls	Golden Gloves light welterweight national champion (1987); Olympics competitor (1988); professional boxer	
Phil Jackson	1945–present	Born and lived for several years in Deer Lodge	National Basketball Association (NBA) power forward (1968–1980) and head coach (1990–2011); considered one of the Top 10 coaches in NBA history	
Levi Leipheimer	1973–present	Born and raised in Butte, Montana	Professional road bicycle racer; won the 2007, 2008 and 2009 editions of the Tour of California, the 2006 Dauphiné Libéré and the 2005 Deutschland Tour	
Bill Linderman	1920–1965	Born in Bridger; raised in Red Lodge	Professional Rodeo Cowboys Association world champion All-Around Cowboy (1950 & 1953); elected to ProRodeo Hall of Fame (1979)	
Sam McCullum	1952–present	Lived in Kalispell	National Football League wide receiver (1974–1983)	
Dave McNally	1942–2002	Born and lived in Billings	Major League Baseball starting pitcher (1962–1975)	
Scot Schmidt	1961–present	Born in Helena	First ever professional extreme skier	
Lones Wigger	1937–2017	Born in Great Falls	Rifle shooter; three-time Olympic medalist—gold and silver in the 1964 Summer Olympics and gold in the 1972 Summer Olympics; once held 80 national championships and 29 world records	

== Authors ==
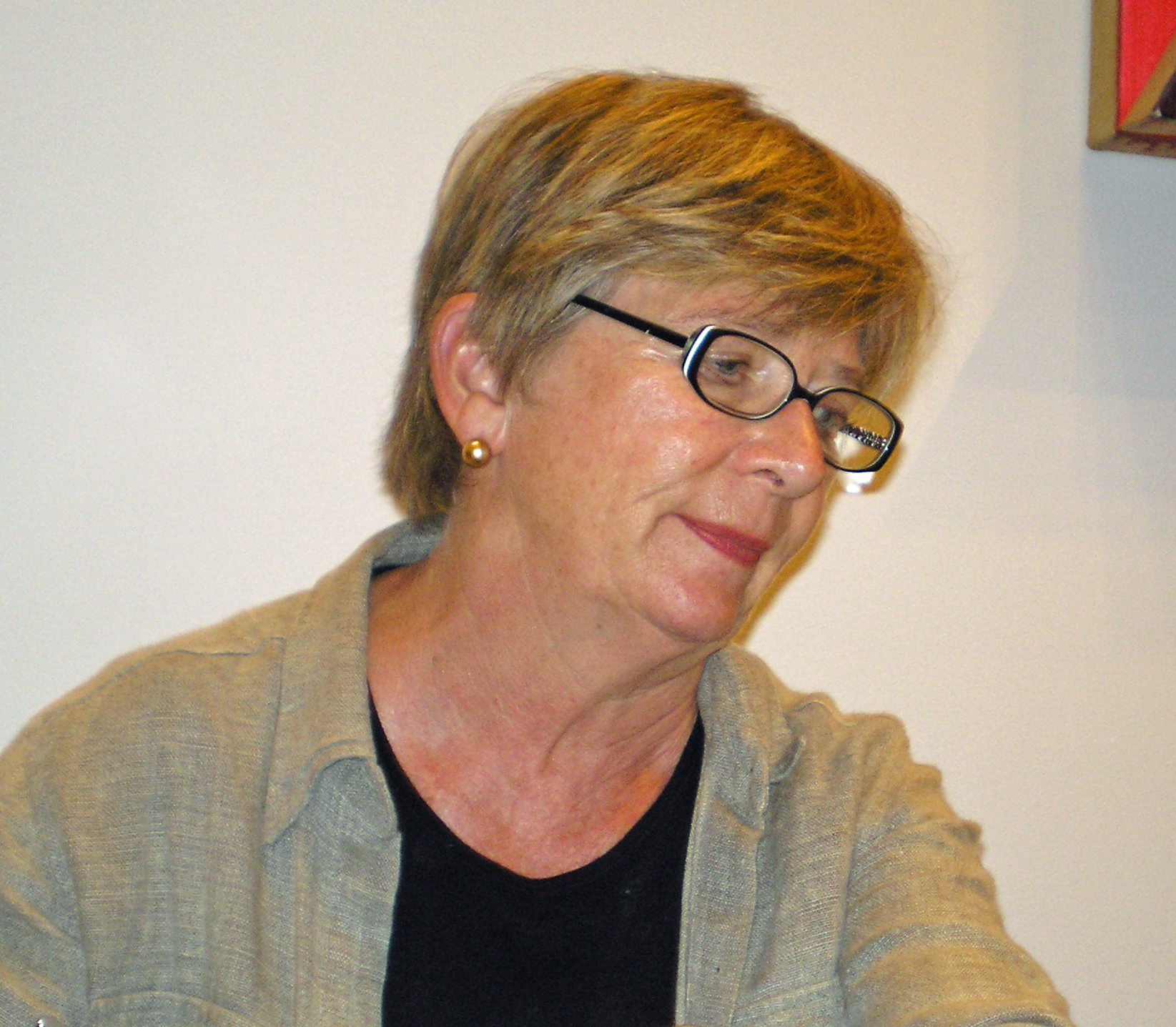
Writer Barbara Ehrenreich in 2006

Authors from Montana
Name	Lifetime	Montana connection	Comments	Refs
Dorothy Baker	1907–1968	Born in Missoula	Novelist	
Rick Bass	1958–present	Moved to Yaak Valley, near Troy in 1987; lives in Missoula	Novelist; memoirist; environmental activist	
B. M. Bower	1871–1940	Lived most of her youth near Big Sandy	Author of novels, short stories; and screenplays about the American Old West	
Richard Brautigan	1935–1984	Lived in Paradise Valley during the late 1970s	Novelist; poet; short story writer	
Tim Cahill	1944–present	Lives in Livingston	Travel writer; founding editor of Outside magazine	
Grace Stone Coates	1881–1976	Moved to Montana as an adult; lived in Stevensville, Butte, and Martinsdale	Short story writer, novelist; poet; journalist	
Margaret Craven	1901–1980	Born in Helena	Short story writer; novelist; journalist	
Ivan Doig	1939–2015	Born in White Sulphur Springs; raised there and in Pondera County; lived near Choteau	Novelist specializing in Montana and western themes	
Barbara Ehrenreich	1941–present	Born and raised in Butte	Columnist; essayist; political activist; feminist	
A. B. Guthrie Jr.	1901–1991	Moved to Montana as an infant; raised in Choteau	Novelist; screenwriter; historian; literary historian; won the Pulitzer Prize for fiction in 1950; grandfather of Eden Atwood	
Jim Harrison	1937–2016	Lives Paradise Valley	Author; poet; essayist; food writer	
William Hjortsberg	1941–2017	Longtime resident of Park County	Novelist; screenwriter	
Joseph Kinsey Howard	1906–1951	Lived in Great Falls	Journalist; historian; author; specialized in the history, culture, and economic circumstances of Montana; Howard's 1943 book, Montana: High, Wide, and Handsome is considered a landmark	
Richard Hugo	1923–1982	Lived in Missoula	Poet; taught creative writing at the University of Montana	
Dorothy M. Johnson	1905–1984	Moved to Whitefish as a child; attended college in, lived in, and taught college in Missoula	Author of American Old West fiction	
William Kittredge	1932–2020	Taught college in Missoula; lived in Missoula since 1969	Author; professor	
Craig Lancaster	1970–present	Long term resident of Billings, which is frequently featured in his novels	Novelist, short story writer, sports writer	
Mary MacLane	1902–1918	Attained international fame in 1902 with her memoir of three months in her life in Butte, The Story of Mary MacLane; referred to Butte throughout the rest of her career and remains a controversial figure there for her mixture of criticism and love for Butte and its people	Pioneering feminist author, film-maker, and media personality	
Cyra McFadden	1939–present	Born in Great Falls; lived in Missoula	Novelist; memoirist	
Thomas McGuane	1939–present	Moved to Montana in 1968; lived in Paradise Valley and McLeod	Novelist; short story writer; essayist; screenplay writer	
Maile Meloy	1972–present	Born and raised in Helena	Fiction writer; sister of Colin Meloy	
Andrew Nelson	1893–1975	Born in Great Falls	Missionary; linguist; lexicographer	
David Quammen	1948–present	Moved to and lives in Bozeman since circa 1973	Fiction, science, and travel writer	
Christopher Paolini	1983–present	Raised and lives in Paradise Valley	Fantasy writer	
James Willard Schultz	1859–1947	Lived in Browning, Carroll, and Bozeman; buried on the Blackfeet Reservation	Also known as "Apikuni"; author; explorer; Glacier National Park guide; fur trader; historian of the Blackfoot Indians	
Wallace Stegner	1909–1993	Raised in Great Falls	Historian; novelist; short story writer; environmentalist; often called the "dean of Western writers"; won the Pulitzer Prize for Fiction (1972)	
Gary Svee	1943–2019	Born, raised, and lives in Billings; attended college in Missoula	Journalist; author	

== Business figures ==
=== Architects ===
Architects from Montana
Name	Lifetime	Montana connection	Comments	Refs
Fred Brinkman	1892–1961	Lived in Kalispell; died in Flathead County	Architect; a dozen of Brinkman's extant works in and around Kalispell have been listed on the National Register of Historic Places	
Robert Reamer	1873–1938	Designed historic buildings in Billings, Helena, Livingston and Gardiner	Architect; most noted for the Old Faithful Inn in Yellowstone National Park	
Fred Fielding Willson	1877–1956	Born and lived in Bozeman	Architect; designed many buildings that are listed on the National Register of Historic Places	

=== Entrepreneurs ===
Entrepreneurs from Montana
Name	Lifetime	Montana connection	Comments	Refs
Charles M. Bair	1857–1943	Lived near Billings, Lavina, and Martinsdale	Railroadman; sheep husbandry; philanthropist	
Mark Britton	1967–present	Born in Butte; raised in Missoula	Entrepreneur (Expedia, Avvo); venture investor; lawyer	
Harry W. Child	1857–1931	Lived in Helena	Entrepreneur who managed development and ranching companies in Helena; a founder and longtime president of the Yellowstone Park Company	
Greg Gianforte	1961–present	Lives in Bozeman	Founder of RightNow Technologies in Bozeman, MT (1997), Montana congressman (2017-21), Montana governor (2021–present)	
James D. Rogers	1949?–present	Lives in Billings	President and CEO of Kampgrounds of America (KOA)	
John D. Ryan	1864–1933	Lived in Butte	Copper magnate; president of Anaconda Copper Mining Company; creator of Montana Power Company	
Ted Turner	1938–present	Lives on a ranch near Bozeman	Entrepreneur; philanthropist; raises buffalo	
Dennis Washington	1934–present	Lives in Missoula	Entrepreneur; industrialist; philanthropist	
John F. Yancey	1826–1903	Buried in Gardiner; substantial business connections there and in Crevice Creek, Montana	Yellowstone National Park concessionaire who operated Yancey's Pleasant Valley Hotel near Tower Junction in Yellowstone (1882–1903)	

== Clergy ==
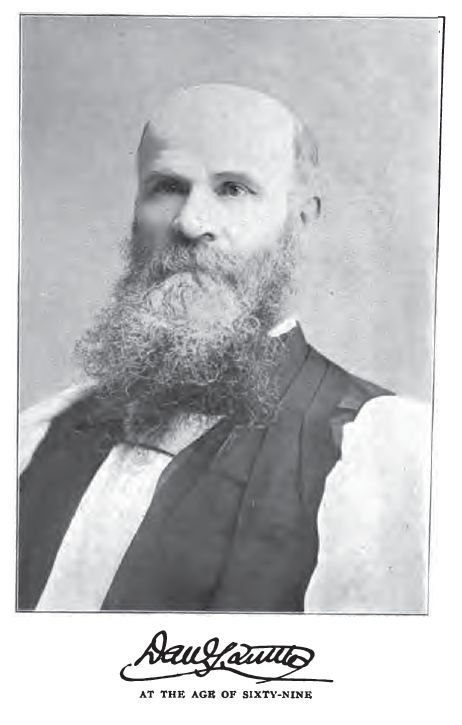
Bishop Daniel Tuttle in 1906

Clergy from Montana
Name	Lifetime	Montana connection	Comments	Refs
John Patrick Carroll	1864–1925	Lived in Helena	Second bishop of Helena; Carroll College in Helena is named in his honor	
Elizabeth Clare Prophet	1939–2009	Lived on Royal Teton Ranch near Gardiner, died in Bozeman	New Age religious figure	
Alexander King Sample	1960–present	Born in Kalispell, Montana	American prelate of the Roman Catholic Church; twelfth and current bishop of Marquette, Michigan	
Daniel Tuttle	1837–1923	Spent considerable time in Montana as an Episcopal bishop	Ordained a bishop of the Episcopal Church in 1866; first assignment was as first Episcopal bishop of Montana (1866–1880), a missionary field that included Montana, Utah, and Idaho at the time	
Sharnael Wolverton		Born in Montana	Founder of Swiftfire Ministries International	

== Entertainment and performing arts ==
Montanans participate in many aspects of the entertainment and performing arts fields, including acting, animation, directing, and music.

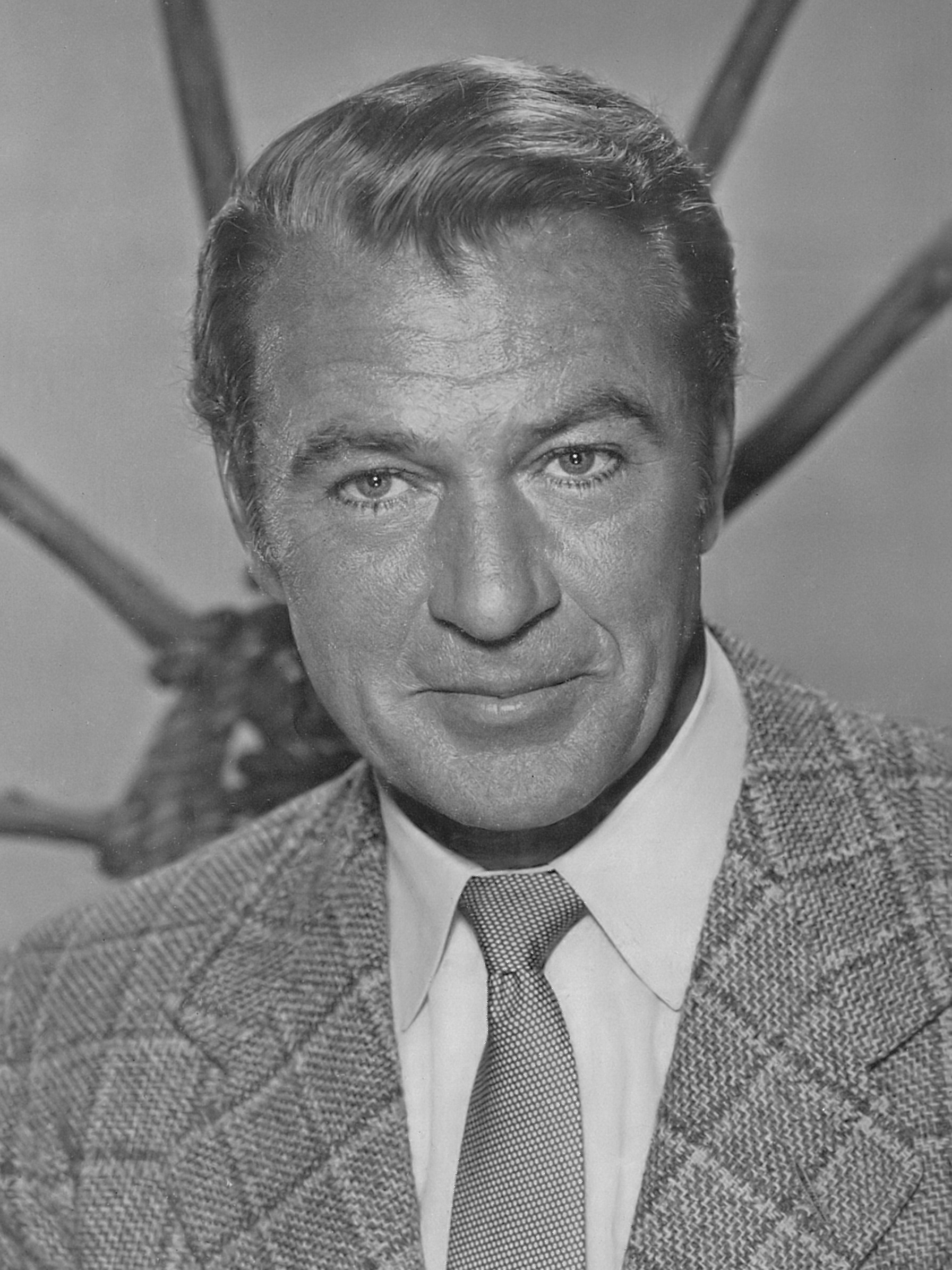
Actor Gary Cooper in 1952

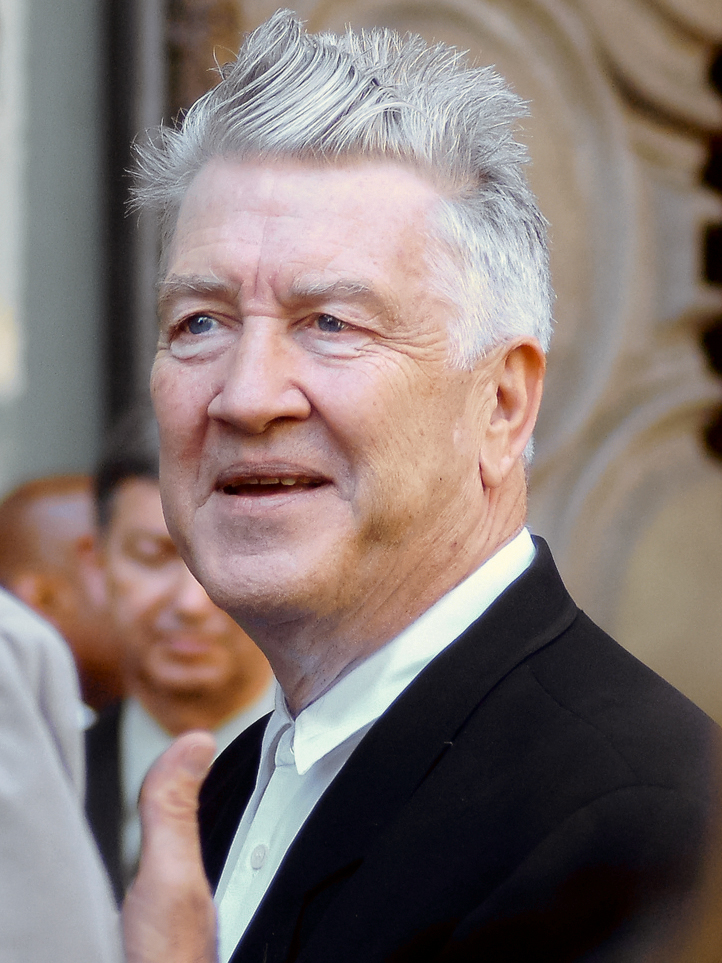
Director David Lynch in 2011

Entertainers from Montana
Name	Lifetime	Montana connection	Comments	Refs
Jeff Ament	1963–present	Born in Havre; raised in Big Sandy; attended college and resides in Missoula	Bassist of Pearl Jam	
Gary Cooper	1901–1961	Born and raised on a ranch near Helena	Actor who specialized in westerns; nominated for five Academy Awards and won twice for Sergeant York (1942) and High Noon (1952)	
David Lynch	1946–2025	Born in Missoula	Film and television director; nominated for four Academy Awards	
Jean Parker	1915–2005	Born in Deer Lodge	Actress; appeared in 70 movies 1932–1966; attended Pasadena schools and graduated from John Muir High School; had a successful career at Metro-Goldwyn-Mayer MGM Studios	
Martha Raye	1916–1994	Born in Butte	Actress; standards singer; nurse; strong supporter of American military; toured with the United Service Organizations (USO) during World War II, Korean War, and Vietnam War; only woman buried in the Special Forces cemetery at Fort Bragg, North Carolina and was buried with full military honors there though never on active duty; known as "Colonel Maggie" to the American military; an honorary Green Beret; awarded Presidential Medal of Freedom in 1993 for her lifetime support to the American military	
Reggie Watts	1972–present	Raised in Great Falls	Singer, beatboxer, comedian	
Michelle Williams	1980–present	Born and raised in Kalispell	Academy Award-nominated actress	
Isaac Brock	1975–present	Helena	Singer	

== Journalists ==
Journalists collect and disseminate information about current events, people, trends, and issues. The following individuals are prominent journalists from Montana.

Journalists from Montana
Name	Lifetime	Montana connection	Comments	Refs
Chet Huntley	1911–1974	Born in Cardwell; attended high school in Whitehall; attended college in Bozeman; died in Big Sky	Television newscaster; co-anchored the evening news program The Huntley-Brinkley Report	
Brent Musburger	1939–present	Raised in Billings; lives part-time in Big Timber	Sportscaster; host of The NFL Today (1975–1989)	
Kirk Siegler	1978–present	Raised in Missoula; lives in Boise, ID.	National correspondent for NPR News; covers the western U.S. with an emphasis on rural issues	
Molly Wood	1975–present	Born in Helena; attended college and graduated from University of Montana	Technology journalist; host of CNET's video series Always On with CNET TV	

== Military ==
Prior to statehood in 1889, the U. S. Army played a key role in facilitating settlement via actions against Native Americans, exploration and surveying. During World War I over 40,000 Montanans served in the armed forces, 25% more than any other state on a per-capita basis. Over 1,500 Montanans died in World War I. World War II brought air bases to Montana with the establishment of Malmstrom AFB, Montana in 1941 outside Great Falls, Montana. The Cold War saw the plains of eastern Montana become Minuteman Missile fields. The following individuals were prominent members of the United States armed forces and/or participated in significant military events in Montana.

=== Medal of Honor recipients ===
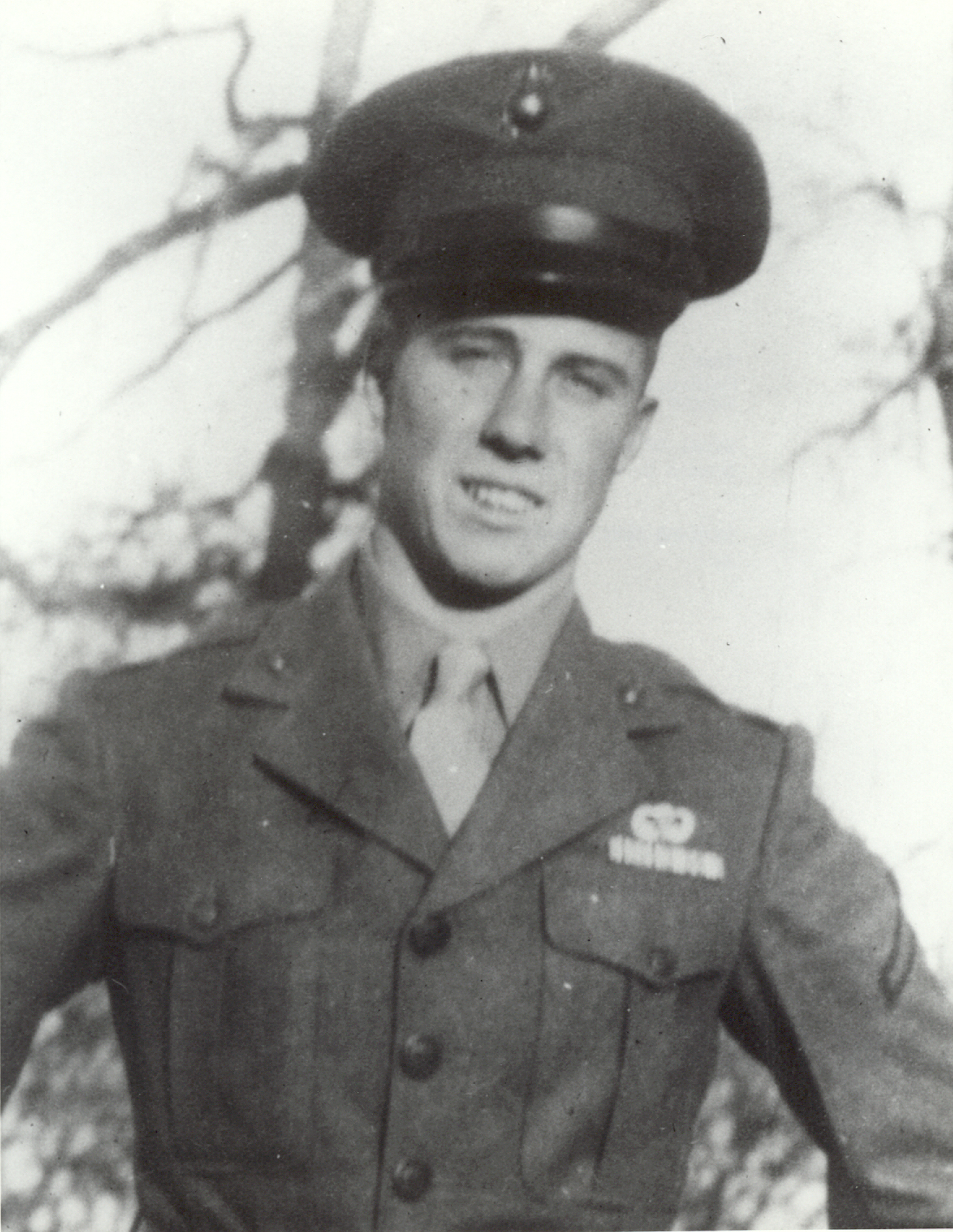
Marine PFC Donald Jack Ruhl circa 1943–1945

Medal of Honor recipients from Montana
Name	Lifetime	Montana connection	Comments	Refs
William Wylie Galt	1919–1944	Native of Geyser, in Judith Basin County	Army captain; Medal of Honor recipient for actions in Italy during World War II; killed in action	
John McLennon	1855–1888	Enlisted at Fort Ellis, near Bozeman; awarded Medal of Honor at Battle of the Big Hole, in southwest Montana	Army sergeant; Medal of Honor recipient for actions in Montana during the Nez Perce War of 1877	
John E. Moran	1856–1930	Lived and died in Great Falls	Army captain; Medal of Honor recipient for actions during the Philippine–American War in 1900	
Laverne Parrish	1918–1945	Raised in Pablo and Ronan	Army Tech 4 (medic); Medal of Honor recipient for actions in the Philippines during World War II; killed in action	
Leo J. Powers	1909–1967	From Madison County	Army private first class; Medal of Honor recipient for actions in Italy during the Battle of Monte Cassino	
Donald J. Ruhl	1923–1945	Raised near Columbus	Marine private first class; Medal of Honor recipient for actions during the Battle of Iwo Jima; killed in action	
Henry Schauer	1918–1997	From Scobey	Army private first class; Medal of Honor recipient for actions in Italy during World War II	
Cornelius C. Smith	1869–1936	Moved to Helena in 1888; joined the Montana National Guard in 1889	Army corporal; Medal of Honor recipient for actions in South Dakota during the Sioux Wars of 1891	

=== Montana territorial period ===
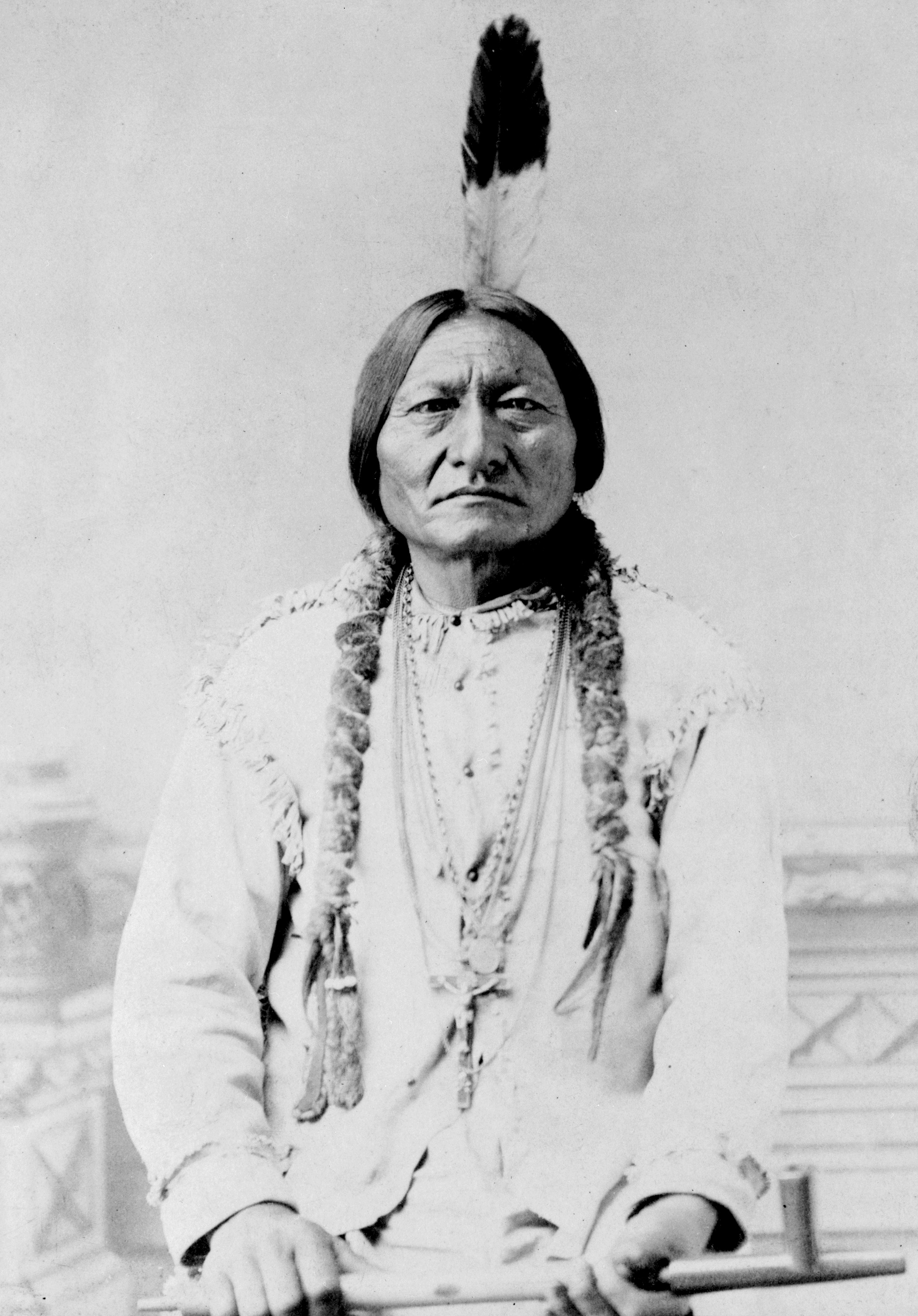
Hunkpapa Sioux leader Sitting Bull in 1885

Military from Montana territorial and pre-territorial period
Name	Lifetime	Montana connection	Comments	Refs
Sitting Bull	1831?–1890	Spent significant portions of his life in southeastern Montana	Hunkpapa Lakota Sioux holy man who led his people during years of resistance to United States government policies; vision of soldiers falling into camp was significant to fighters in the Battle of the Little Bighorn	
Gustavus Cheyney Doane	1840–1892	Stationed at Fort Ellis and buried in Bozeman	U.S. Army Cavalry captain; explorer; inventor; Civil War soldier who played a prominent role in the exploration of Yellowstone National Park as a member of the Washburn–Langford–Doane Expedition	
Looking Glass	1832?–1877	Principal architect of the military campaign for his people through much of western Montana during the Nez Perce War	War leader of the Nez Perce; initially opposed going to war with the whites	
Wooden Leg	1858–1940	Spent significant portions of his life in southeastern Montana	Northern Cheyenne warrior who fought in the Battle of the Little Bighorn and several other battles in the late 1800s	
William F. Raynolds	1820–1894	Led Raynolds Expedition (1859–1860) to the Yellowstone River and Bighorn Canyon; Raynolds Pass named in his honor	U.S. Army colonel; explorer; engineer; Mexican War and Civil War officer; member of the U.S. Army Corps of Topographical Engineers	
Marcus Reno	1834–1889	Buried in the Custer National Cemetery (1967) with honors, on the Little Bighorn Battlefield	Career military officer in the American Civil War and in the Black Hills War against the Lakota (Sioux) and Northern Cheyenne; had significant role in the Battle of Little Big Horn	
White Bird	18??–1892	Led the military campaign for his people through much of western Montana during the Nez Perce War	War leader of the Lamátta band of the Nez Perce; led his band to and stayed in Pincher Creek, Alberta, Canada	
Little Wolf	1820?–1904	Born in and spent most of his life in southeastern Montana	Leader of the Northern Cheyenne; was not present at the Battle of the Little Bighorn but played roles preceding and after it; led his people in many other battles and the Northern Cheyenne Exodus	

=== State of Montana ===
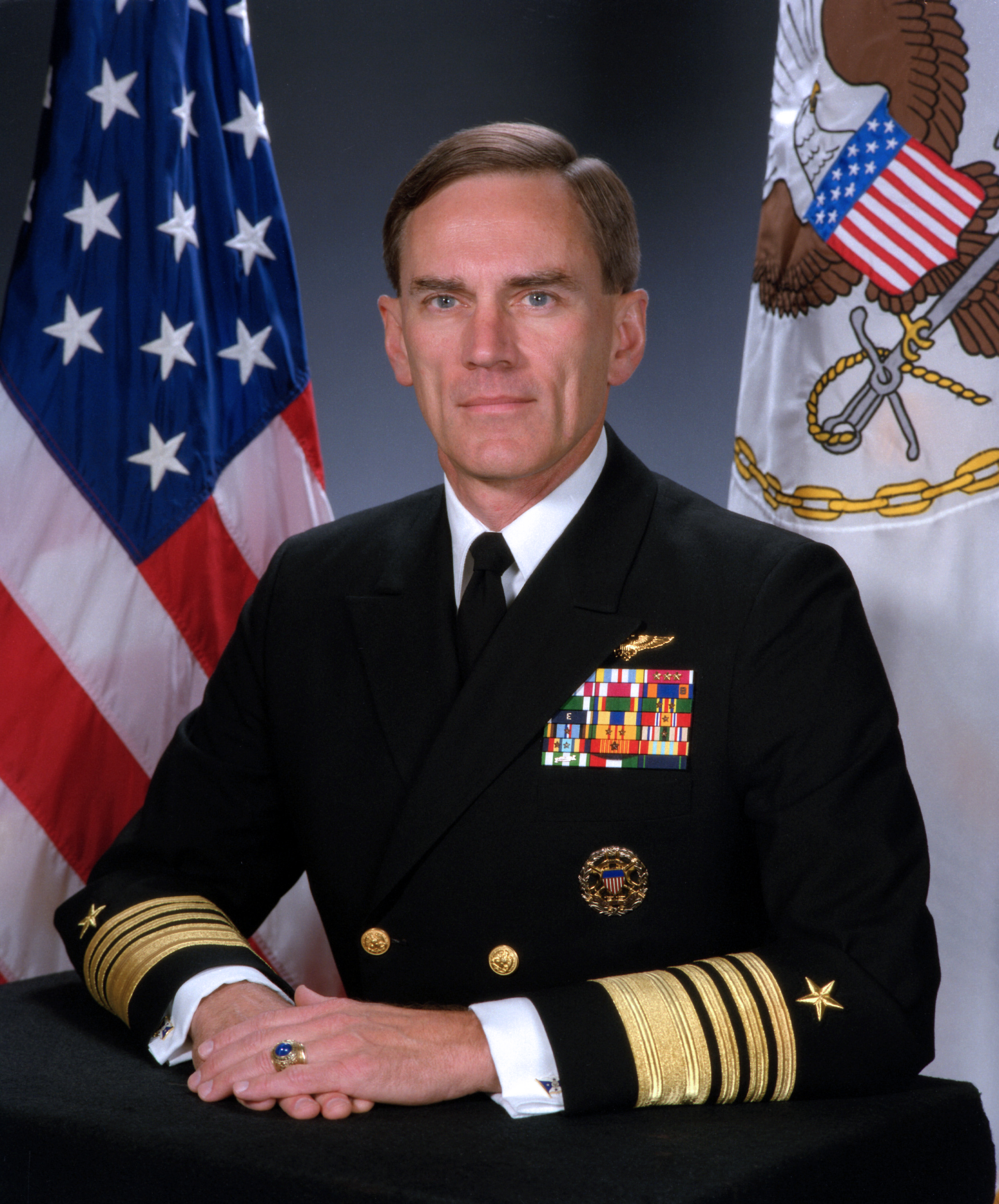
Admiral Jay Johnson while Chief of Naval Operations in 1996

Military from Montana
Name	Lifetime	Montana connection	Comments	Refs
Hiram M. Chittenden	1858–1917	Built North Entrance Road and Roosevelt Arch in Yellowstone (Gardiner)	Seattle district engineer for the Army Corps of Engineers; in Yellowstone (1891–1892, 1899–1906)	
Thomas Patrick Gerrity	1913–1968	Born in Harlowton	United States Air Force general; commander of the Air Force Logistics Command	
Jay L. Johnson	1946–present	Born in Great Falls	Naval pilot; 26th Chief of Naval Operations (1996–2000)	
Nels Running	1941–present	Born and raised in Frenchtown	Air Force major general; Vietnam War veteran; awarded 7 Distinguished Flying Crosses	
U.S. Grant Sharp	1906–2001	Born in Chinook; raised in Fort Benton	United States Navy admiral; Commander in Chief, United States Pacific Fleet (CINCPACFLT) (1963–1964); Commander in Chief, United States Pacific Command (CINCPAC) (1964–1968); related to Ulysses S. Grant by marriage	

== Pioneers (pre-1900) ==
Prior to 1850, Montana was unsettled territory. Much of the state was part of a much larger Dakota Territory in 1863 and the westernmost portion of the state became part of the Oregon Territory in 1848. The territory was the realm of fur traders and Native Americans. The first European settlements were Christian missions in the western part of the state (1821). A fur trading settlement at Fort Benton on the Missouri River was established in 1847. In the 1850s, pioneers traveling along the Mormon and Oregon Trails started moving north into the Beaverhead River country establishing Montana's first cattle ranches. Gold was first discovered in Montana at Gold Creek near present day Garrison, Montana in 1852. Major gold strikes were made at Alder Gulch, Montana in 1864 spawning present day Virginia City, Montana and Bannack, Montana, the first territorial capital. In 1883 the Northern Pacific Railway completed its transcontinental route across Montana followed by the Great Northern Railway in 1893. From the first gold strikes to the beginning of the 20th century, pioneers flowed into Montana to establish mines, cattle ranches, lumber mills, banks, mercantiles, tourism, Yellowstone National Park and farms across the state. The following individuals played a prominent role in this pioneer period of Montana history.

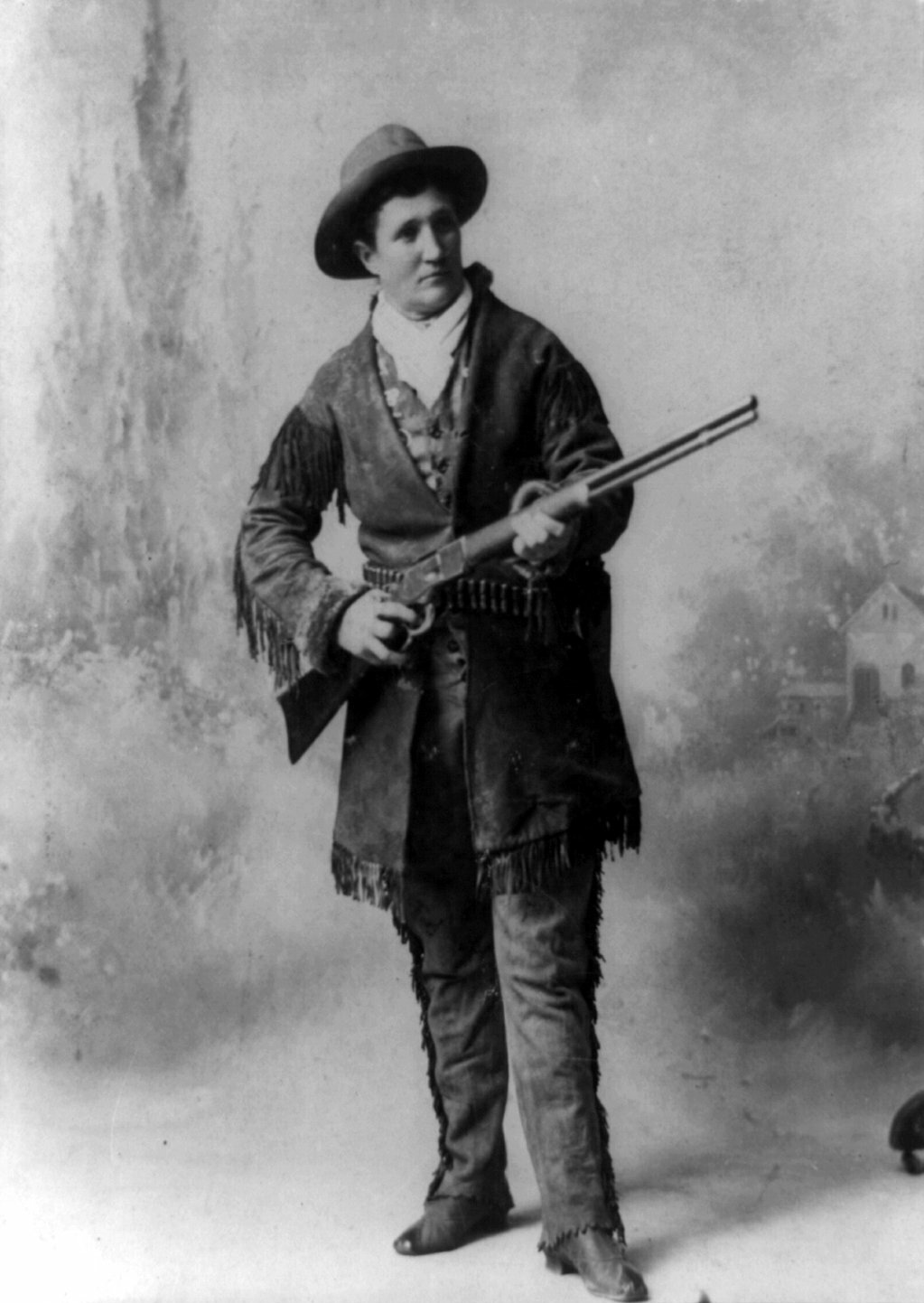
Calamity Jane in 1895

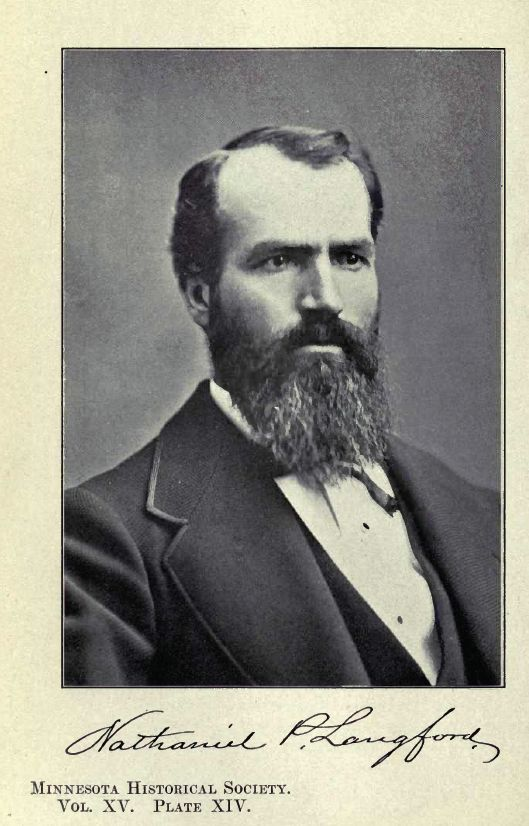
Nathaniel P. Langford

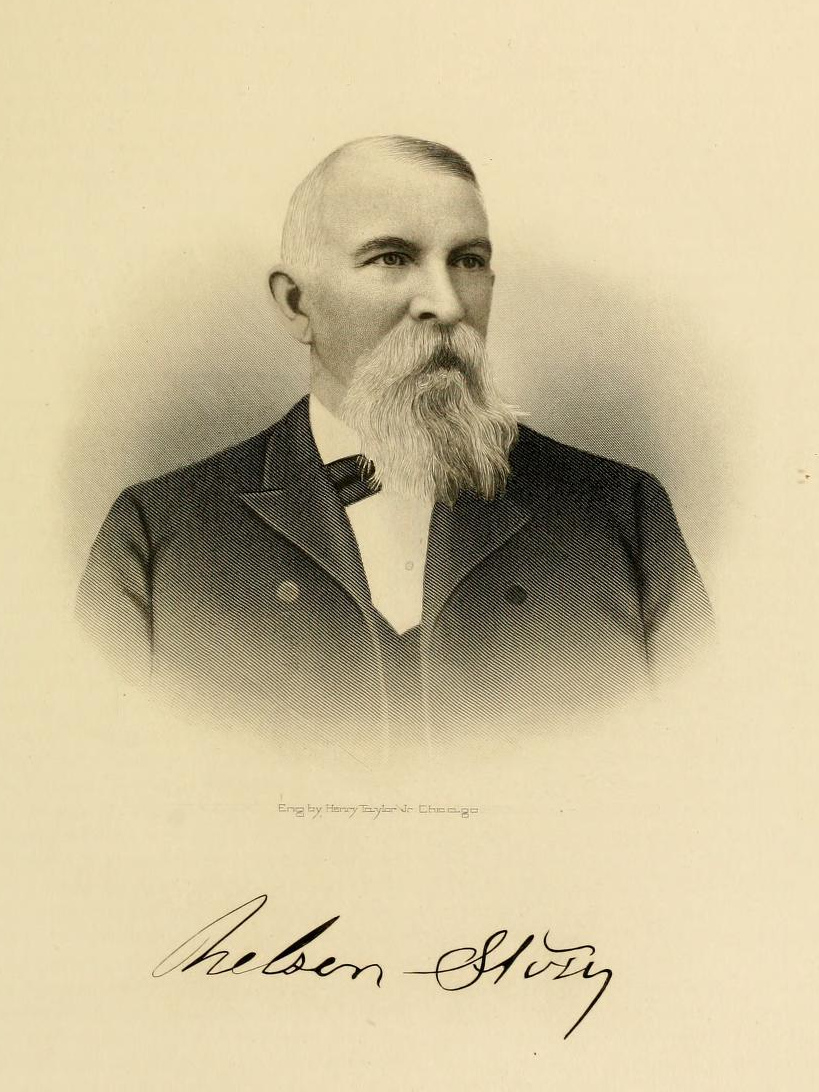
Nelson Story circa 1900

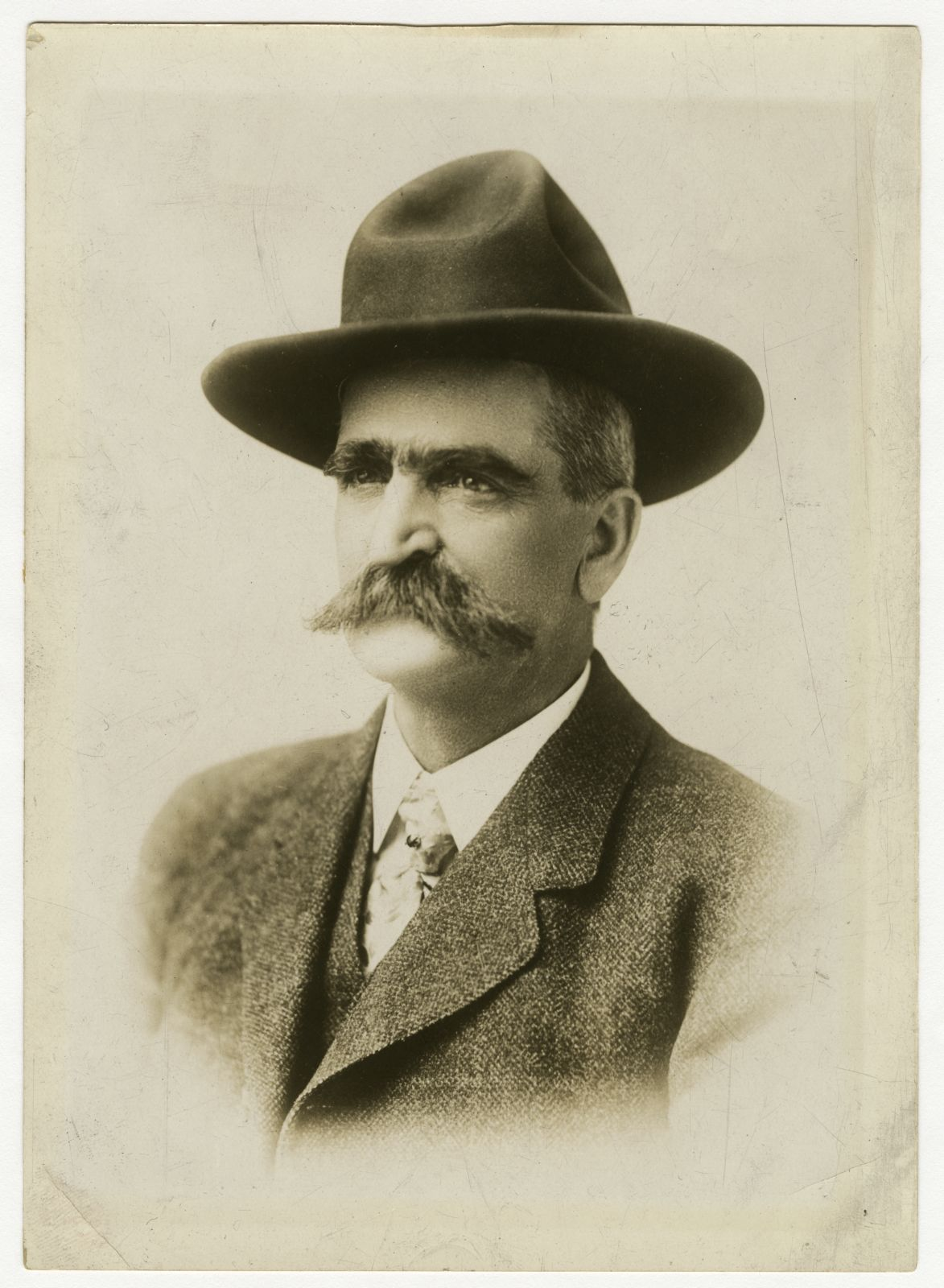
Seth Bullock 1893

Pioneers (pre–1900) from Montana
Name	Lifetime	Montana connection	Comments	Refs
John Bozeman	1835–1867	Lived in Bozeman and Deer Lodge	Entrepreneur; established the Bozeman Trail (1863), a cutoff route from the Oregon Trail in Wyoming to Bannack, Montana; guided miners to Virginia City through the Gallatin Valley; established town of Bozeman in Gallatin Valley	
Seth Bullock	1849–1919	Lived in Helena	Entrepreneur; lawman; legislator; Montana territorial senator, sheriff of Lewis and Clark County, Montana, hardware store owner, hotel owner and sheriff in Deadwood, South Dakota	
William A. Clark	1839–1925	Lived in Bannack, Deer Lodge, and Butte	Entrepreneur; Copper King; banker; railroader; United States senator (1899–1900, 1901–1907)	
Marcus Daly	1841–1900	Lived in Butte	Entrepreneur; Copper King; horse breeder	
Pierre-Jean De Smet	1801–1873	Established Christian missions in Flathead Valley and Bitterroot Valley of Montana	Belgian Roman Catholic priest and member of the Society of Jesus (Jesuits); missionary work among the Native Americans of the Western United States in the mid-19th century	
Morgan Earp	1851–1882	Lived in Butte (1877–1880); law officer there (1879–1880)	Brother of Deputy U.S. Marshals Virgil and Wyatt Earp; participated in the Gunfight at the O.K. Corral	
Truman C. Everts	1816–1901	Lived in Helena	Member of the 1870 Washburn-Langford-Doane Expedition exploring the area which later became Yellowstone National Park; became lost for 37 days during the 1870 expedition and later wrote about his experiences for Scribner's Monthly; appointed Assessor of Internal Revenue for the Montana Territory by President Abraham Lincoln (1864–1870)	
F. Augustus Heinze	1869–1914	Lived in Butte	Entrepreneur; Copper King	
Calamity Jane	1852–1903	Lived in Miles City, Livingston and Paradise Valley	Also known as "Martha Jane Cannary Burke"; frontierswoman; professional scout; acquaintance of Wild Bill Hickok; fighter of Native American Indians	
Liver-Eating Johnson	1824?–1900	Lived near Alder Gulch and Red Lodge	Mountain man of the American Old West; inspiration for the film Jeremiah Johnson (1972)	
Conrad Kohrs	1869–1914	Lived near Deer Lodge	Cattle baron; the home ranch near Deer Lodge, Montana is now the Grant-Kohrs Ranch National Historic Site	
Nathaniel P. Langford	1832–1911	Lived in Helena	Explorer; businessman; bureaucrat; vigilante; historian; played an important role in the early years of the Montana gold fields, territorial government and the creation of Yellowstone National Park; appointed Collector of Internal Revenue and National Bank Examiner for the Montana Territorial government (1864–1869)	
Sol Star	1840–1917	Lived in Helena	Businessman; bureaucrat; he served as territorial auditor and personal secretary to the governor; partnered with Seth Bullock in a hardware store in Deadwood, South Dakota by the promise of business stemming from the gold rush	
Nelson Story	1838–1926	Lived near and in Bozeman	Cattle rancher and "Cattle King"; gold miner; vigilante; led first major cattle drive from Texas into Montana (1866) along the Bozeman Trail, which inspired Lonesome Dove	
Henry D. Washburn	1832–1871	Lived in Helena	Led the 1870 Washburn-Langford-Doane Expedition to explore what would become Yellowstone National Park; Mount Washburn, located within the park, is named for him; surveyor general of Montana in 1869 and served until his death (1869–1871) U.S. representative from Indiana; general in the Union Army during the American Civil War	
Lester S. Willson	1839–1919	Lived in and buried in Bozeman	U.S. Civil War officer in the Union Army; assistant quartermaster general of New York; Montana merchant and politician in Bozeman, Montana	

== Politicians ==
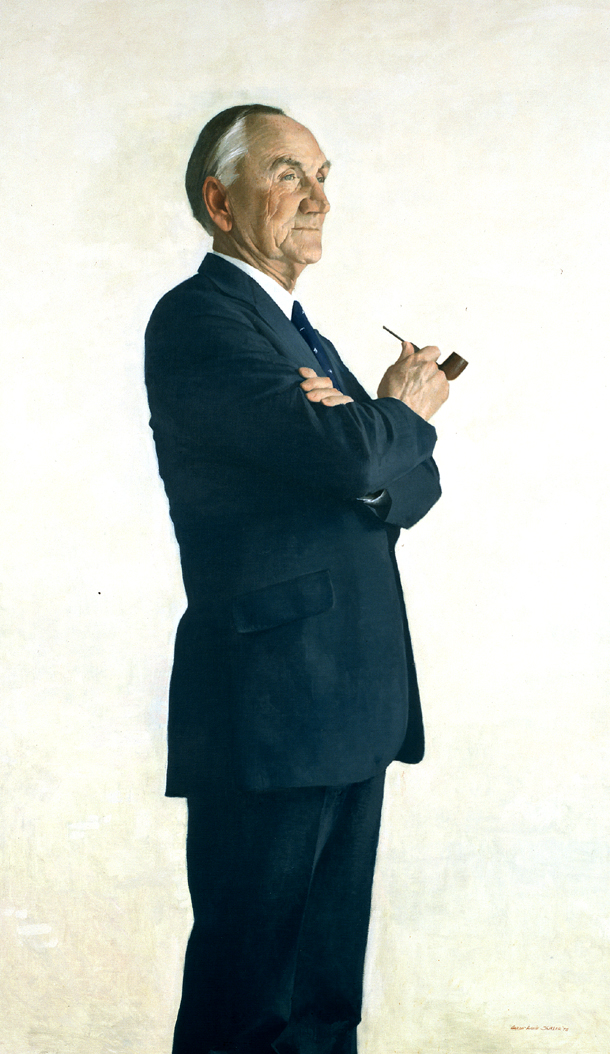
Senator and ambassador Mike Mansfield

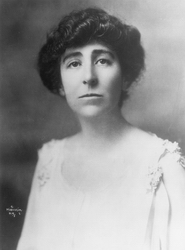
Politician Jeannette Rankin

Montana became a territory on May 26, 1864. The territorial government was first formed at the first territorial capital Bannack. Later the territorial capital was moved to Virginia City (1865), and Helena (1875). On November 8, 1889, Montana became a state and Helena remained the capital. During the territorial period, most senior government positions were appointed by the U.S. President. Once Montana became a state, elections were held for state and federal offices. The U.S. President still appointed judges to the federal courts in Montana. Prominent Montana politicians include the longest serving Senate Majority Leader, Senator Mike Mansfield and first woman Congresswoman, Jeannette Rankin.

=== State legislators ===
The Montana State Legislature is the state legislature of the U.S. state of Montana. It is composed of the 100-member Montana House of Representatives and the 50-member Montana Senate.

=== Judges ===
Judges from Montana
Name	Lifetime	Montana connection	Comments	Refs
James F. Battin	1925–1996	Raised, attended college, and died in Billings	United States representative from Montana (1961–1969); judge for United States District Court for the District of Montana (1969–1990, chief judge from 1978)	
James R. Browning	1918–2012	Born in Great Falls; raised in Belt; attended college in Bozeman and law school in Missoula	Judge on United States Court of Appeals for the Ninth Circuit	
Karla M. Gray	1947–2017	Lived in Butte and Helena	Second female justice and first female chief justice of the Montana Supreme Court (1991–2008, chief justice 2000–2008)	
Sidney Runyan Thomas	1953–present	Born, raised and attended college in Bozeman; attended law school in Missoula	Judge on the United States Court of Appeals for the Ninth Circuit; professor	

=== Political leaders and activists ===
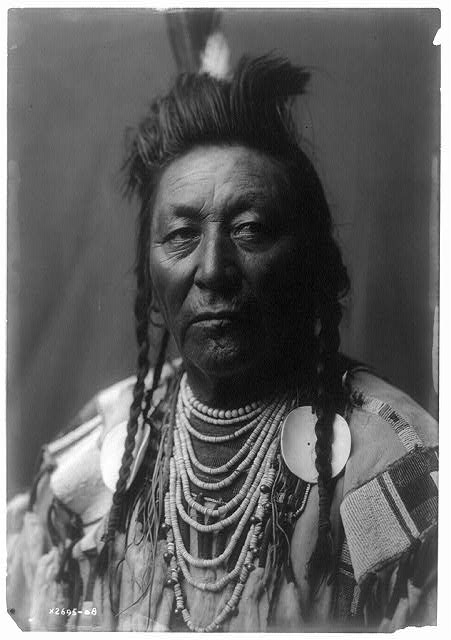
Chief Plenty Coups circa 1908

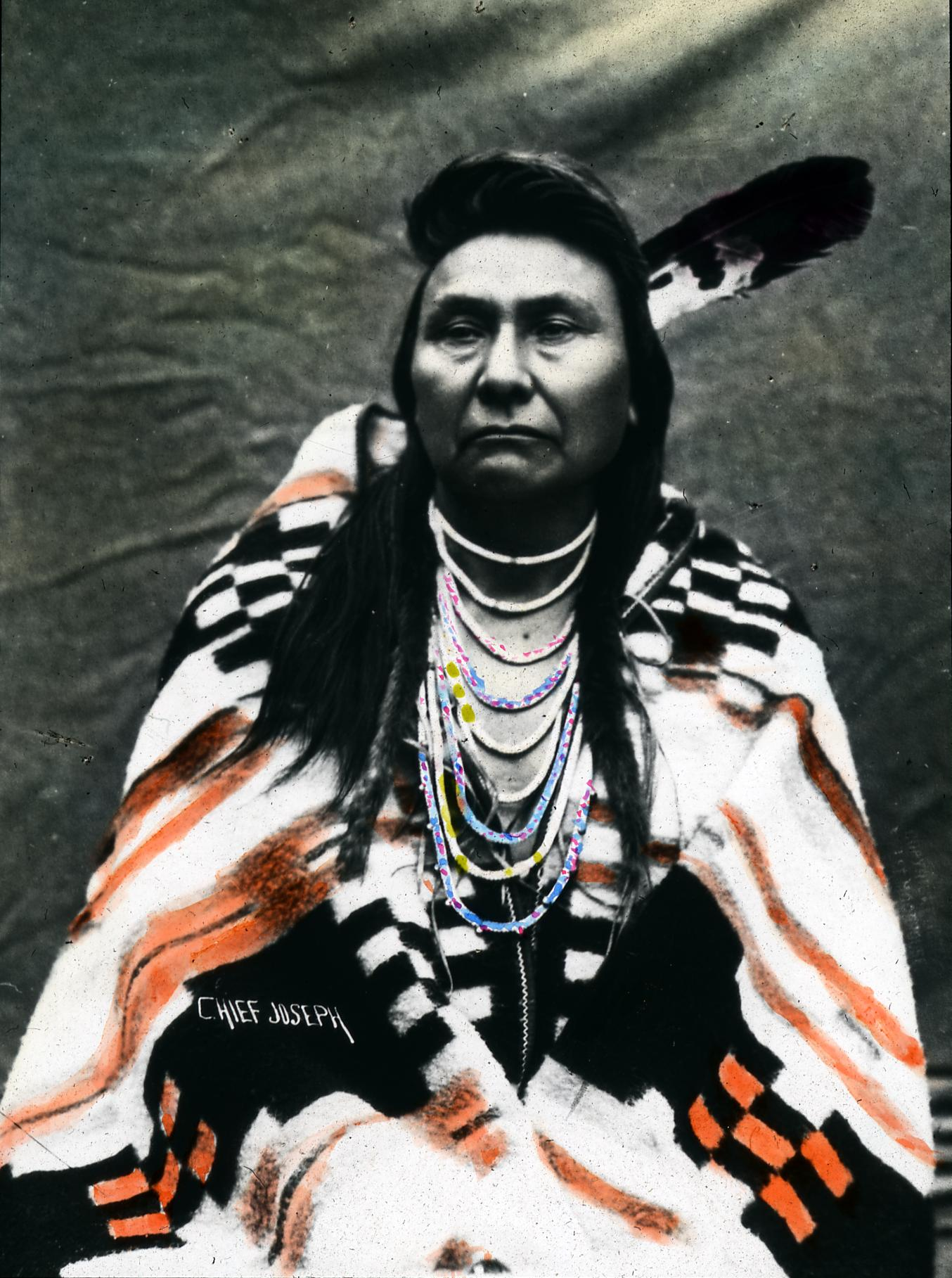
Chief Joseph in the late 1800s

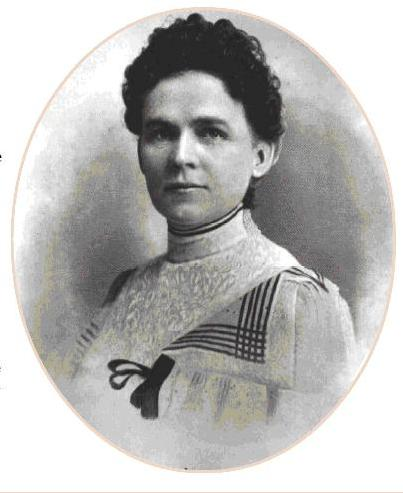
Lawyer and pioneer of women's rights Ella Haskell

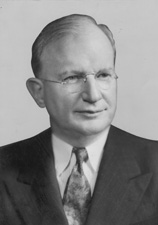
United States Senator Burton K. Wheeler

Political leaders and activists from Montana
Name	Lifetime	Montana connection	Comments	Refs
Elouise P. Cobell	1946–2011	Born and lived on the Blackfeet Indian Reservation	Accountant; banker; rancher; lead plaintiff in Cobell v. Salazar, a successful $3.4 billion class action settlement on behalf of Native Americans against the federal government	
Plenty Coups	1848–1932	Born in Montana, possibly near Billings; lived in south-central Montana most of his life; spent later years near Pryor	Chief of the Mountain Crows, or Apsáalooke, band of the Crow Nation	
Ella J. Knowles Haskell	1860–1911	Moved to Montana from New Hampshire after finishing college; lived and worked in Helena, Butte, and then Glendive	Pioneer of women's rights in Montana; teacher; first woman to practice law in Montana and the first woman ever to plead a case before the U.S. Circuit Court; first woman to run for state attorney general	
George Horse-Capture	1937–2013	Graduated from high school in Butte; taught college in Great Falls	Anthropologist; writer; political activist; participated in the Native American occupation of Alcatraz Island	
Chief Joseph	1840–1904	Led his people through much of western Montana during the Nez Perce War, eventually surrendering in the Bear Paw Mountains, close to the Canada–US border	Chief of the Wallowa band of the Nez Perce; humanitarian; peacemaker	
Denise Juneau	1967–present	Lived in Billings, Browning, Bozeman, Missoula, and Helena	Teacher; Montana State Superintendent of Public Instruction; head of Montana Office of Public Instruction; first American Indian woman to be elected to statewide executive office in Montana; member of Mandan and Hidatsa tribes	
Daniel Kemmis	1946–present	Born and raised in eastern Montana; attended law school in Missoula	Author; lawyer; speaker and minority leader of the Montana House of Representatives (1983–1985); mayor of Missoula (1990–1996)	
Thomas Leforge	1850–1931	Moved to Virginia City as a teen	Montana militiaman; scout; camp follower; often lived with the Crow Nation; author of historical account Memoirs of a White Crow Indian	
Mike Mansfield	1903–2001	Moved to Great Falls at a very young age; attended college in Butte and Missoula	Served in the Army, Navy, and Marine Corps; miner; professor; senator (1953–1977); longest serving Senate majority leader (1961–1977); ambassador to Japan (1977–1988)	
Earl Old Person	1929–2021	Born and lived on the Blackfeet Indian Reservation	Chief of the Blackfoot Confederacy	
Marc Racicot	1948–present	Born in Thompson Falls; raised in Miles City and Libby	Governor of Montana (1993–2001); chairman of the Republican National Committee (2002–2003); lawyer	
Jeannette Rankin	1880–1973	Born near and attended college in Missoula	First female member of the United States Congress (1917–1919, 1941–1943); only member of Congress to vote against United States entry into World War II; sister of Wellington D. Rankin	
Wellington D. Rankin	1884–1966	Born near and attended college in Missoula	Attorney; Montana attorney general (1920–26); landowner; brother of Jeannette Rankin	
William V. Roth Jr.	1921–2003	Born in Great Falls; raised in Helena	U.S. senator from Delaware (1971–2001); namesake of Roth IRA	
Jacob Thorkelson	1876–1945	Moved to Montana as an adult in 1913; lived in Dillon	Navigator, medical doctor, reserve naval officer, United States representative from Montana (1939–1941)	
Carl Venne	1946–2009	Born in Helena; raised and lived on the Crow Indian Reservation	Chairman of the Crow Nation (2002–2009)	
Burton K. Wheeler	1876–1945	Settled in Butte after losing his belongings in a poker game during a train stop in Butte while on the way to Seattle, Washington	Lawyer and United States senator from Montana (1923–1947)	
Bill Yellowtail	1948–present	Born in Wyola; lived in Helena and Bozeman	Administrator; member of Montana Senate (1985–1993); member of the Crow Nation	
Robert Yellowtail	1889?–1988	Born and raised in Lodge Grass	Lawyer; Indian leader; member of the Crow Nation	

== Recreationalists ==
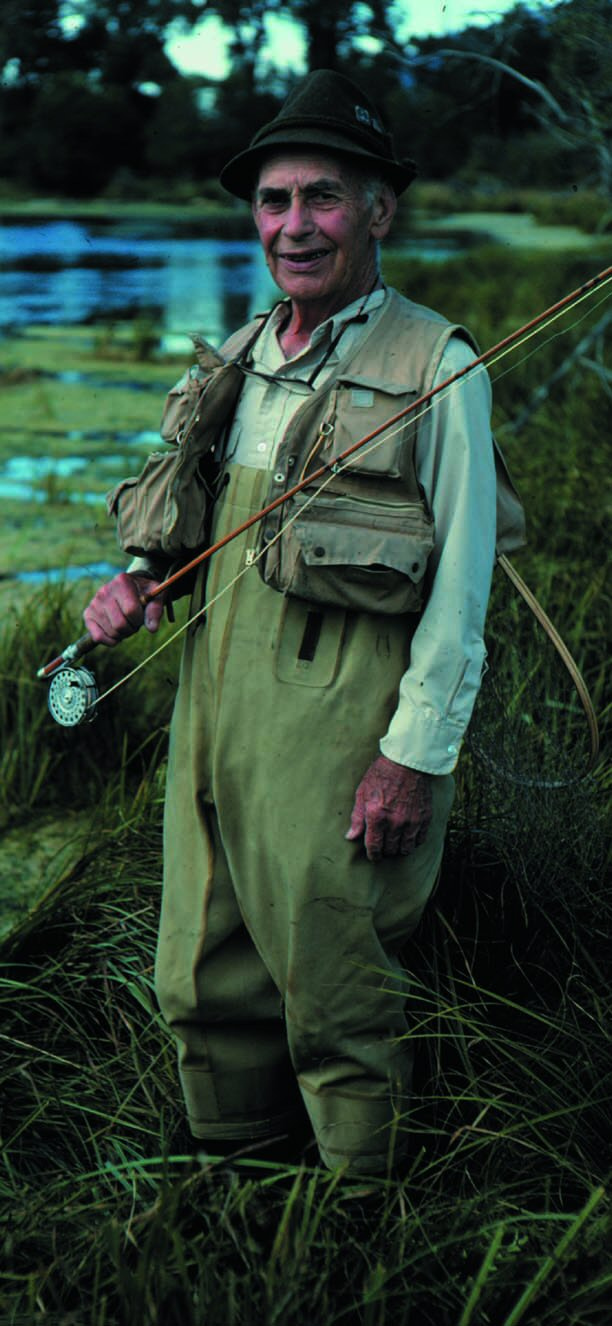
Dan Bailey, ca 1970s

Recreation is an activity of leisure, leisure being discretionary time. The "need to do something for recreation" is an essential element of human biology and psychology. Recreational activities are often done for enjoyment, amusement, or pleasure and are considered to be "fun". Since the late 1800s, Montana has been a mecca for fly fishing, hunting, hiking, climbing and other recreations. The following individuals are prominent in the recreational history of Montana.

Recreationalists from Montana
Name	Lifetime	Montana connection	Comments	Refs
Conrad Anker	1962–present	Lives in Bozeman	Rock climber, mountaineer, and author famous for his challenging ascents in the high Himalaya and Antarctica	
Dan Bailey	1904–1982	Lived in Livingston	Fly-shop owner; innovative fly developer; staunch Western conservationist	
George F. Grant	1906–2008	Born and lived in Butte	Angler; innovative fly developer; author; conservationist; active for many years on the Big Hole River	
Alex Lowe	1958–1999	Lived in Bozeman	Mountain climber; American Alpine Club's Underhill Award (1995); The North Face climbing team; mountain peak near Bozeman named in his honor	
Bob Marshall	1901–1939	Worked near Missoula; Bob Marshall Wilderness in Montana named in his honor	Forester; wilderness advocate; co-founder of The Wilderness Society	
Frank B. Wynn	1859–1922	Died in Glacier National Park; spent considerable time climbing in Montana	Psychologist; environmental conservationist and alpinist; credited with many first ascents in Glacier National Park	

== Scientists ==
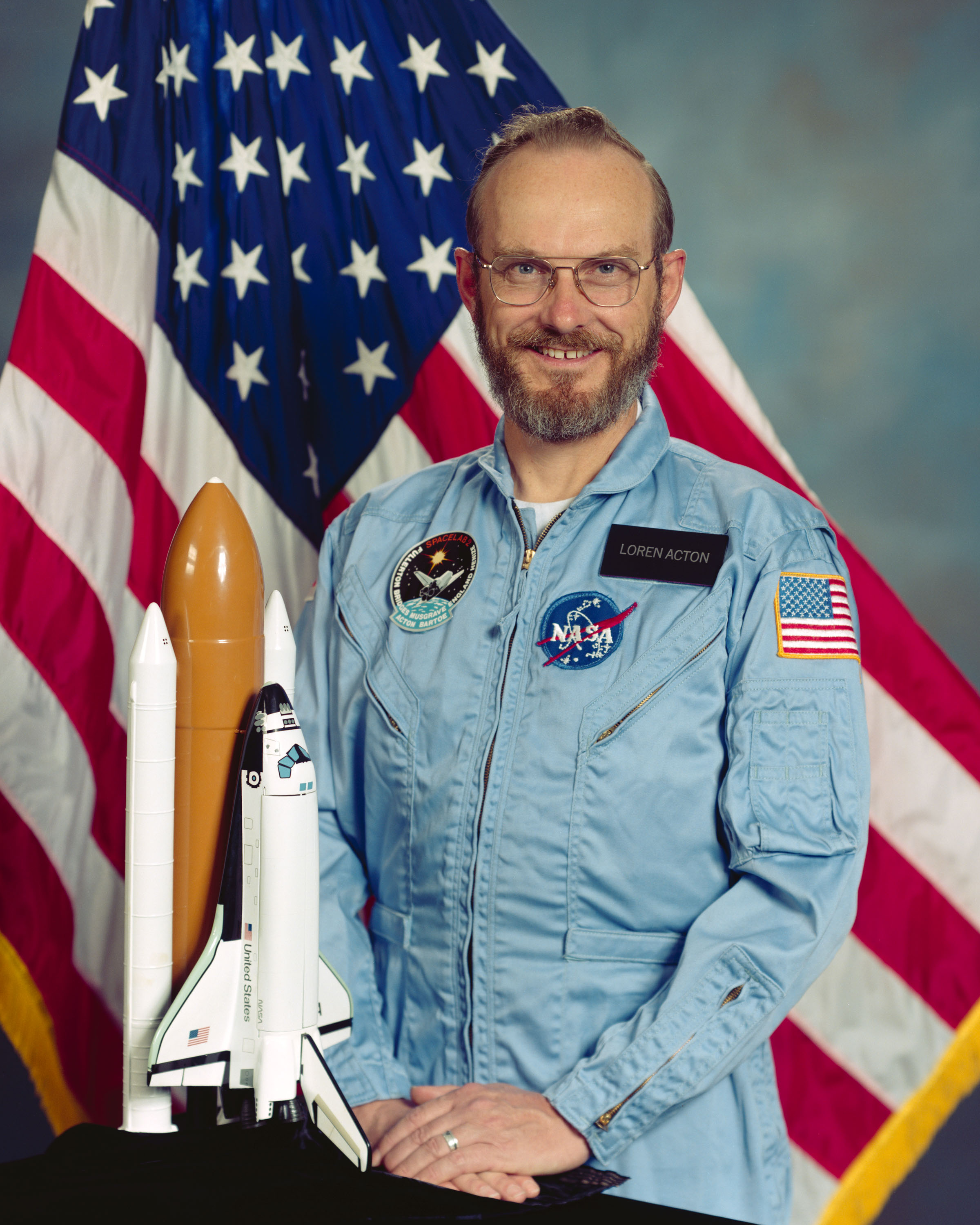
Loren Acton in a space suit in 1985

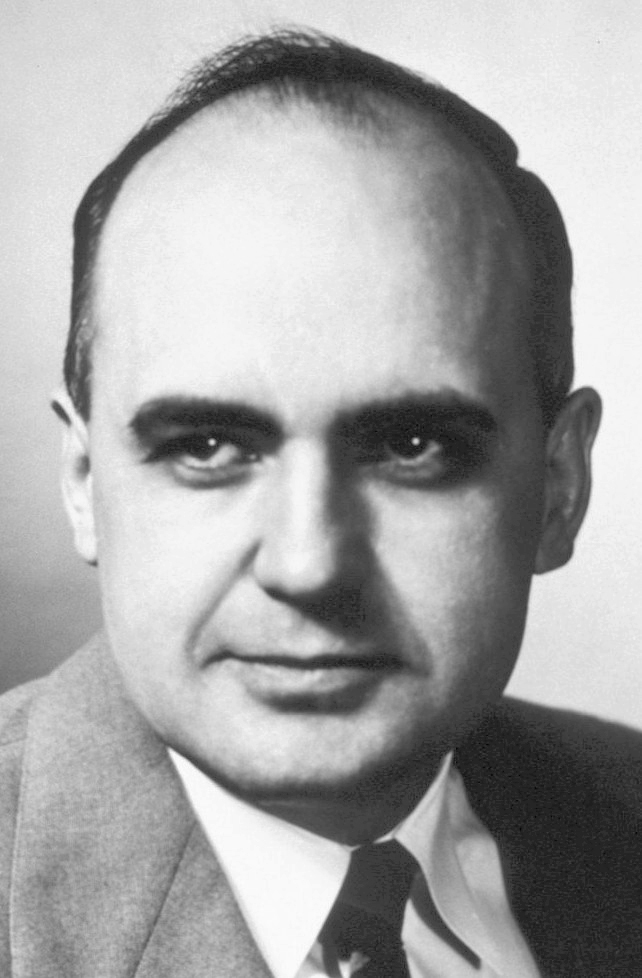
Vaccine specialist Maurice Hilleman

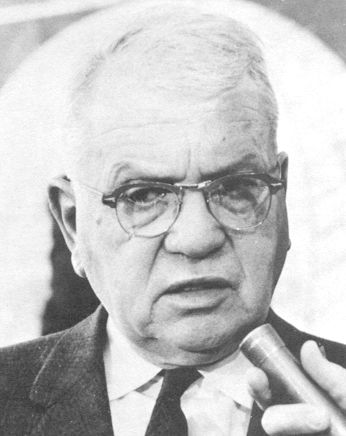
Nobel Prize in Chemistry laurette Harold Urey

Scientists from Montana
Name	Lifetime	Montana connection	Comments	Refs
Loren Acton	since 1936	Born in Lewistown; attended college in Bozeman	Physicist and astronaut who flew on Space Shuttle mission STS-51-F as a payload specialist; unsuccessful candidate for the Montana legislature in 2006; physics professor at Montana State University	
Willy Burgdorfer	1925–2014	Lived in Hamilton	Medical entomologist; discovered the bacterial pathogen that causes Lyme disease, a spirochete which was named Borrelia burgdorferi in his honor; worked for many years at the Rocky Mountain Laboratory (RML) in Hamilton, a U.S. National Institutes of Health research facility	
Don G. Despain	since 1940	Lives in Bozeman	Botanist; plant ecologist; fire behavior specialist; specializes in the flora of Yellowstone National Park	
George Bird Grinnell	1849–1938	Significant contributions to the preservation of Glacier National Park and bison in Montana; Grinnell Glacier named in his honor	Anthropologist; historian; naturalist; writer; associate of James Willard Schultz	
Torey Hayden	since 1951	Born in Livingston; attended high school in Billings	Child psychologist; non-fiction author; special education teacher	
Maurice Hilleman	1919–2005	Born and raised near Miles City; attended college in Bozeman	Microbiologist who developed over three dozen vacciness; credited with saving more lives than any other scientist of the 20th century; Robert Gallo described him as "the most successful vaccinologist in history"	
Lester Hogan	1920–2008	Born and raised in Great Falls; attended college in Bozeman	Physicist and pioneer in microwave and semiconductor technology	
Norman Jefferis "Jeff" Holter	1914–1983	Born, attended college, and died in Helena	Biophysicist; invented the Holter monitor; awarded the Laufman-Greatbatch Prize for his contributions to medical technology by the Association for the Advancement of Medical Instrumentation in 1979	
Leroy Hood	since 1938	Born in Missoula	Biologist; physician; biochemist; Lemelson–MIT Prize recipient; member of National Inventors Hall of Fame	
Jack Horner	since 1946	Born in Shelby; attended college in and resides in Bozeman	Paleontologist; discovered and named Maiasaura, providing the first clear evidence that some dinosaurs cared for their young; technical advisor for all of the Jurassic Park films, including being partial inspiration for the character Dr. Alan Grant	
Howard Taylor Ricketts	1871–1910	Worked in the Bitterroot Valley on Rocky Mountain spotted fever	Bacteriologist; pathogen causing Rocky Mountain spotted fever, Rickettsia rickettsii was named after him	
Harold Urey	1893–1981	Studied zoology in Missoula	Won the Nobel Prize in Chemistry in 1934	
Irving Weissman	since 1939	Born and studied science in Great Falls	Professor at Stanford University; director of the Stanford Institute of Stem Cell Biology and Regenerative Medicine	

== Others ==
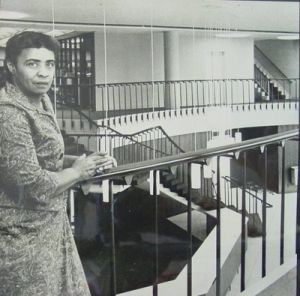
Alma Smith Jacobs at a library circa 1960s

Other people from Montana
Name	Lifetime	Montana connection	Comments	Refs
Walter Breuning	1896–2011	Moved to Montana at age 18; lived and died in Great Falls	Supercentenarian; lived to age 114; at one time the world's oldest living man	
Alma Smith Jacobs	1916–1997	Born in Lewistown; grew up in Great Falls; lived in Helena; died in Bozeman	Librarian; head of Great Falls Public Library (1954–1973); first African American Montana State Librarian (1973–1981)	
Greg Mortenson	since 1957	Lives in Bozeman	Mountain climber; philanthropist	
Huck Seed	since 1969	Grew up in Corvallis	Professional poker player	
Susan Wicklund	since 1954	Lives in Livingston	Physician; operated women's clinics in Bozeman and Livingston	

- Dustin Lind, director of hitting and assistant hitting coach for the San Francisco Giants

== Infamous Montanans ==
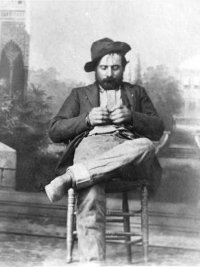
Harvey "Kid Curry" Logan in an undated photo

Infamous people from Montana
Name	Lifetime	Montana connection	Comments	Refs
Kyle Aaron Boyle	1977–2006	Born and raised in Whitefish	Mass murderer responsible for Seattle's Capitol Hill massacre	
W. A. Boyle	1904–1985	Born and raised in Bald Butte, Montana; later lived in other parts of Montana	President of United Mine Workers of America union (1963–1972); later convicted in a murder case that also involved embezzlement	
Ted Kaczynski	1942–2023	Lived near Lincoln at the time of his capture	Domestic terrorist known as the Unabomber	
Harvey "Kid Curry" Logan	1867–1904	Spent several years in various parts of Montana, especially in what is now Chouteau County and Phillips County	Outlaw; circumstances of death disputed	
Henry Plummer	1832–1864	Lived in Bannack, then part of Idaho Territory	Sheriff/outlaw of Bannack; hanged by vigilantes	
Russell Eugene Weston	since 1956	Lived in Rimini most of his adult life prior to his arrest	Committed to a mental institution after the 1998 United States Capitol shootings	

== Fictional Montanans ==
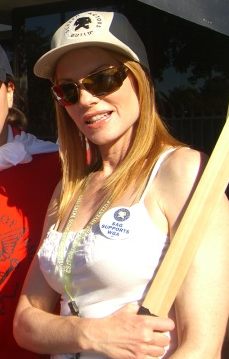
Marg Helgenberger, who portrays Catherine Willows, in 2007

Fictional Montanans
Name	Lifetime	Montana connection	Comments	Refs
Violet Beauregarde	Not stated	Born and raised in Miles City per the 1971 film but in other adaptations is stated as being from two different cities in Georgia	Fictional character in the Roald Dahl children's books Charlie and the Chocolate Factory and Charlie and the Great Glass Elevator, and the Willy Wonka & the Chocolate Factory (1971) and Charlie and the Chocolate Factory (2005) film adaptations	
Peggy Hill	since 1965	Born on a cattle ranch in Montana	Fictional character in the animated series King of the Hill	
Lindsay Monroe	Not stated	Born and raised in Bozeman	Fictional character from the CBS crime drama CSI: NY	
Catherine Willows	since 1963	CBS biography originally stated she was from Bozeman; later it was changed to Las Vegas, Nevada	Fictional character on the CBS crime drama CSI: Crime Scene Investigation	

== See also ==
- List of Montana suffragists
- Lists of Americans
