= Wolverton (disambiguation) =

Wolverton is part of Milton Keynes, Buckinghamshire, England.

Wolverton may also refer to:

== Places ==
In Australia

- Wolverton, West End, a heritage-listed house in Townsville, Queensland, Australia

In England

- Wolverton, Kent
- Wolverton, Hampshire
- Wolverton Common, Hampshire
- Wolverton, Shropshire
- Wolverton, Warwickshire
- Wolverton, Wiltshire

In the United States

- Wolverton, Minnesota
- Wolverton Township, Wilkin County, Minnesota

== Other uses ==
- Wolverton (surname)
- Baron Wolverton

== See also ==
- Woolverton
- Wolferton
- Wolverhampton
