= Wolverton (surname) =

Wolverton is a surname. Notable people with the surname include:

- Andrew Wolverton, American soccer player
- Basil Wolverton, artist
- Bill Wolverton, scientist
- Charles A. Wolverton, U.S. congressman
- Charles E. Wolverton, Oregon Supreme Court Chief Justice
- Dave Wolverton (1957–2022), author
- Harry Wolverton, baseball player
- John M. Wolverton, American politician
- Karin Wolverton, American operatic soprano
- Monte Wolverton, American editorial cartoonist
- Robert Lee Wolverton, US Army colonel
- Sharnael Wolverton, American author, minister, and television host
- Simon Peter Wolverton, American politician
- Troy Wolverton, American journalist

== See also ==
- Baron Wolverton, a British noble title held by the Glyn family
