= Albert, Alfred and Chris Schlechten =

Albert Schlechten in the Spanish Peaks of Montana

Albert (1876 – 1961), Alfred (May 24, 1877 – November 1970), and Alfred "Chris" Schlechten (May 9, 1911 – November 1979) were members of a family noted for their photography of Montana, especially their images of Gallatin County, Montana, and Yellowstone National Park. Headquartered in Bozeman, Montana, brothers Alfred and Albert started a family photography business in 1900, and the business continued until the death of Alfred's son Chris Schlechten in the late 1970s. The heirs of the Schlechten family sold an extensive collection of the photographs taken by the three men to the Museum of the Rockies in 1980.

== Schlechten brothers ==
Albert and his brother Alfred came to Montana in 1900 and purchased the Bozeman photography business of Grant and Tippet. They renamed the studio "Schlechten Brothers." Considered the top photographers in the Gallatin valley, they also published a significant number of postcards featuring their images of the Bozeman area. About 1910, the two brothers opened separate studios.

Albert Schlechten specialized in landscape photography and his work was notable for the use of a large format field camera which produced 11 x 14 negatives. He used it to take a series of photos of Yellowstone National Park. He also took many photos of locations and the landscape in and around the Bozeman area. Albert sold his photography studio in 1922 went into wheat farming. After his farming venture failed due to drought, he started the "Central Studio" in Anaconda, Montana in 1929 and operated it until his retirement in 1946. Alfred Schlechten continued his photography business in Bozeman, specializing in commercial portrait photography, until the 1940s.

== Chris Schlechten ==
Alfred "Chris" Schlechten, the son of Alfred Schlechten, first achieved considerable notoriety and was temporarily expelled from Montana State College (now Montana State University-Bozeman) for his part in creating a spoof college annual in 1933. While the faculty advisory committee had reviewed and approved a traditional annual, Chris and the annual's editor, Dave Rivenes (1912–2003), along with a small team of fellow conspirators, worked secretly on an alternative version that was sent to press. The publication featured Schlechten's prank photos of clubs and organizations, replaced the basketball team with a row of Butterfinger candy bars, and posed students in humorous and unexpected ways. A photo showing a collection of horses' hind ends was identified as some of Rivenes' fraternity brothers. The annual also prominently featured a mysterious, bearded character dubbed "Clarence Mjork" who was superimposed by Schlechten into existing photos. "Clarence Mjork" was supposedly the "class playboy" from fictional "Endgate, Montana," but actually was a friend of the annual staff, and due in part to Schlechten's mastery of photographic processes, his image appeared in nearly every group photo in the album. Unable to stop the presses, the college administration managed to pull six pages that they considered the most offensive from all but two copies. The school put Rivenes on probation (he earned straight F's due to the time he spent on the yearbook) and temporarily expelled Chris, but the National Association of College Annuals declared the publication the "most original" of the year, and it won additional awards. Eventually, Chris was readmitted and permitted to graduate.

Following college, Chris first ran a studio in West Yellowstone, Montana and in his family's tradition, created extensive photography of Yellowstone National Park. Later, he took over the Schlechten photography studio in Bozeman in the 1940s. Until his death in the late 1970s, he won several awards during his career from the Professional Photographers of America (PPA) and was notable for his professional portraiture. He also mentored young photographers and his studio did double duty as a training ground for new professional photographers.

In the meantime, the 1933 annual is considered one of the finest college pranks of all time, and is now a collector's item. Rivenes had obtained the two uncensored copies of the annual and donated one to MSU in 1989. "Clarence Mjork" reappeared in 2003 as the grand marshal of the MSU homecoming parade.

== Legacy ==
The heirs of the Schlechten family sold an extensive collection of the photographs taken by the three men to the Museum of the Rockies in 1980. The collection includes more than 10,000 images, including over 175 of Albert Schlechten's 11 X 14 negatives.
