= Nels Running =

US Major General

Ronald Nels Running
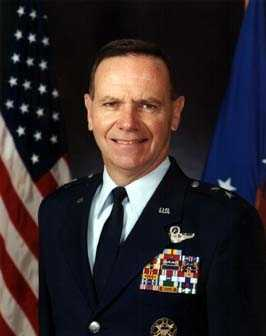
- Major General Nels Running, USAF
- Born: 1941 (age 84–85); Frenchtown, Montana
- Military career
- Allegiance: United States of America
- Branch: United States Air Force
- Service years: 1964–1997
- Rank: Major general
- Units: 469th Tactical Fighter Squadron, 357th Tactical Fighter Squadron
- Conflicts: Vietnam War
- Awards: Defense Distinguished Service Medal; Defense Superior Service Medal; Legion of Merit; Distinguished Flying Cross (7)

Ronald Nels Running (born 1941) is a retired United States Air Force Major General who has more than 3,800 flying hours in F-105D, F-5 A/E, F-4 D/E and F-16A aircraft. This number of flying hours is significantly higher than the level of 3,000 flying hours that the Air Force requires to award its highest ranking of Command Pilot.

== Early life and education ==
Running is a native of Frenchtown, Montana. When he left his hometown in 1960 to attend the United States Air Force Academy, he had never boarded an airplane. He graduated in 1964 with a Bachelor of Science in military science.

His later education includes time spent at the Armed Forces Staff College in Norfolk, Virginia, and participation with other senior officials in courses offered by Harvard University.

== Military career ==
Running flew 274 combat missions in the F-105 throughout his two tours of duty during the Vietnam War. He then became a member of the flight demonstration team United States Air Force Thunderbirds, flying the F-4E. Later, he commanded the Aggressor Squadron at Clark Air Base, which is in the Philippines. At the time of his retirement from the Air Force on August 1, 1997, Running had achieved over 3,800 hours in flight time.

He has been honored with many major awards including a Distinguished Flying Cross with six oak leaf clusters, an Air Medal with 25 oak leaf clusters, and a Vietnam Service Medal with four bronze stars.

== Later in life ==
In 2003, Running was chosen to lead the commemoration of the 50th anniversary of the Korean War, from its start in 1950 to its truce in 1953. One of its goals was to bring recognition to the veterans who were often neglected. Running said the events were commemorations, not celebrations, stating: "Commemorate really means remember. We're going to recognize, honor and remember the service provided during the Korean War." Activities took place in both America and South Korea. He resides in Arlington, Virginia.
