= Leo J. Powers =

United States Army Medal of Honor recipient

- Born: April 5, 1909; Anselmo, Nebraska, U.S.
- Died: July 14, 1967 (aged 58); Butte, Montana
- Burial place: Holy Cross Cemetery, Butte, Montana
- Military career
- Allegiance: United States
- Branch: United States Army
- Rank: Sergeant
- Units: 133rd Infantry Regiment, 34th Infantry Division
- Conflicts: World War II; *Battle of Monte Cassino
- Awards: Medal of Honor

Leo J. Powers (April 5, 1909 – July 14, 1967) was a United States Army soldier and a recipient of the United States military's highest decoration—the Medal of Honor—for his actions in World War II during the Battle of Monte Cassino.

== Biography ==
A farmer before the war, Powers joined the Army from Alder Gulch, Montana, on September 17, 1942. By February 3, 1944, was serving as a private first class in the 133rd Infantry Regiment, 34th Infantry Division. On that day, northwest of Cassino, Italy, Powers single-handedly destroyed three German machine gun emplacements. He was awarded the Medal of Honor a year later, on January 15, 1945.

Powers reached the rank of Sergeant before leaving the Army. He died at age 58 and was buried in Holy Cross Cemetery, Butte, Montana.

== Medal of Honor citation ==
Powers' official Medal of Honor citation reads:

For conspicuous gallantry and intrepidity at risk of life above and beyond the call of duty. On 3 February 1944, this soldier's company was assigned the mission of capturing Hill 175, the key enemy strong point northwest of Cassino, Italy. The enemy, estimated to be at least 50 in strength, supported by machineguns emplaced in 3 pillboxes and mortar fire from behind the hill, was able to pin the attackers down and inflict 8 casualties. The company was unable to advance, but Pfc. Powers, a rifleman in 1 of the assault platoons, on his own initiative and in the face of the terrific fire, crawled forward to assault 1 of the enemy pillboxes which he had spotted. Armed with 2 handgrenades and well aware that if the enemy should see him it would mean almost certain death, Pfc. Powers crawled up the hill to within 15 yards of the enemy pillbox. Then standing upright in full view of the enemy gunners in order to throw his grenade into the small opening in the roof, he tossed a grenade into the pillbox. At this close, the grenade entered the pillbox, killed 2 of the occupants and 3 or 4 more fled the position, probably wounded. This enemy gun silenced, the center of the line was able to move forward again, but almost immediately came under machinegun fire from a second enemy pillbox on the left flank. Pfc. Powers, however, had located this pillbox, and crawled toward it with absolutely no cover if the enemy should see him. Raising himself in full view of the enemy gunners about 15 feet from the pillbox, Pfc. Powers threw his grenade into the pillbox, silencing this gun, killing another German and probably wounding 3 or 4 more who fled. Pfc. Powers, still acting on his own initiative, commenced crawling toward the third enemy pillbox in the face of heavy machine-pistol and machinegun fire. Skillfully availing himself of the meager cover and concealment, Pfc. Powers crawled up to within 10 yards of this pillbox fully exposed himself to the enemy gunners, stood upright and tossed the 2 grenades into the small opening in the roof of the pillbox. His grenades killed 2 of the enemy and 4 more, all wounded, came out and surrendered to Pfc. Powers, who was now unarmed. Pfc. Powers had worked his way over the entire company front, and against tremendous odds had single-handedly broken the backbone of this heavily defended and strategic enemy position, and enabled his regiment to advance into the city of Cassino. Pfc. Powers' fighting determination and intrepidity in battle exemplify the highest traditions of the U.S. Armed Forces.

== Awards and decorations ==

Badge	Combat Infantryman Badge		
1st row	Medal of Honor		
2nd row	Bronze Star Medal Retroactively Awarded, 1947	Purple Heart with 1 Oak leaf cluster	Army Good Conduct Medal
3rd row	American Campaign Medal	European–African–Middle Eastern Campaign Medal with 2 Campaign stars	World War II Victory Medal

== See also ==
- List of Medal of Honor recipients
- List of Medal of Honor recipients for World War II

== Sources ==
- "Medal of Honor recipients - World War II (M-S)". Medal of Honor citations. United States Army Center of Military History. June 8, 2009. Archived from the original on December 21, 2007.
