= Sharnael Wolverton =

Sharnael Wolverton is an American author, minister, and television host.

She was born in Montana but currently resides in Louisiana. She ministers internationally as the founder of Swiftfire Ministries International. Her books include "The Science Of Miracles", "Keys to Third Heaven", " The Seers Handbook" and "Spiritual Reflections of a Montana Girl in a Louisiana State." Her television show is called "Swiftfire with Sharnael Wolverton."

== Published books ==
- Seers Handbook (Swiftfire Publishing, 2007) ISBN 0-9796622-1-4
- Keys to Third Heaven: Using Third Heaven Revelation to Impact a World (Swiftfire Publishing, 2007) ISBN 0-9796622-0-6
- Spiritual Reflections of a Montana Girl in a Louisiana State (Swiftfire Publishing, 2009) ISBN 0-615-27222-3
