= Livingston, Montana =

City in Park County, Montana, United States

- City
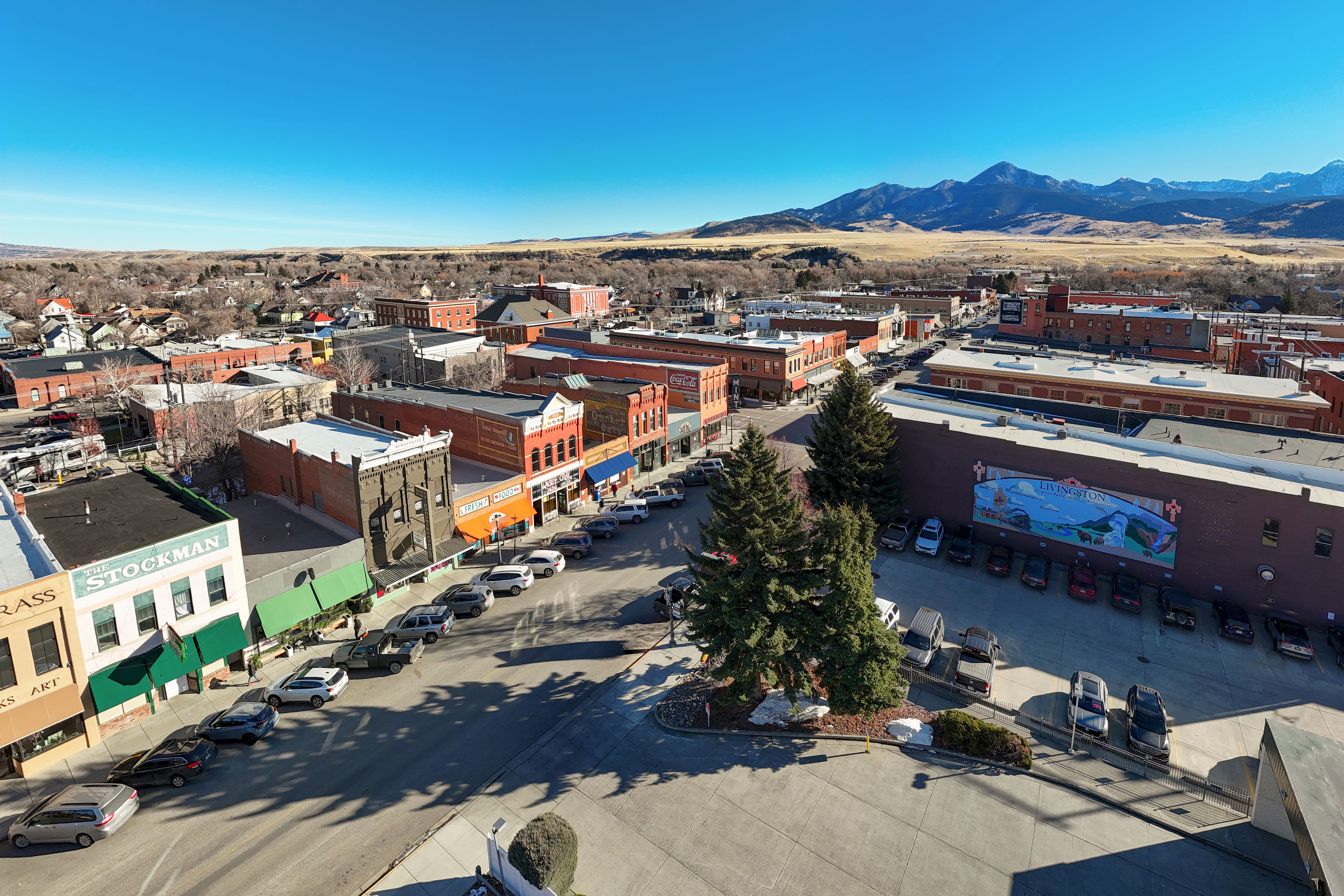
- Downtown Livingston (2024)

- Location within Park County and Montana
- Coordinates: 45°39′42″N 110°34′49″W
- Country: United States
- State: Montana
- County: Park

Area
  - Total: 6.03 sq mi (15.63 km^{2})
  - Land: 5.98 sq mi (15.49 km^{2})
  - Water: 0.058 sq mi (0.15 km^{2})
- Elevation: 4,495 ft (1,370 m)

Population (2020)
  - Total: 8,040
  - Density: 1,344.6/sq mi (519.16/km^{2})
- Time zone: UTC-7 (Mountain (MST))
  - Summer (DST): UTC-6 (MDT)
- ZIP code: 59047
- Area code: 406
- FIPS code: 30-43975
- GNIS ID: 2410851
- Website: livingstonmontana.org

Livingston is a city in and the county seat of Park County, Montana, United States. It is in southwestern Montana, on the Yellowstone River, north of Yellowstone National Park. As of the 2020 census, the population of the city was 8,040.

== History ==
The founding of the small historical railroad and ranching town of Livingston is a direct result of the Northern Pacific Railway (NPR). This site became a centralized point in the Rocky Mountains and the NPR's location for railroad shops to service their steam trains before ascending the Bozeman Pass, the line's highest point, located immediately west. Livingston also became the first gateway town to America's first national park, Yellowstone, which the NPR promoted heavily to visitors from the East. The NPR also operated a branch line running 50 miles (80 km) south through Paradise Valley, first to Cinnabar station and later to Yellowstone's north entrance in Gardiner.

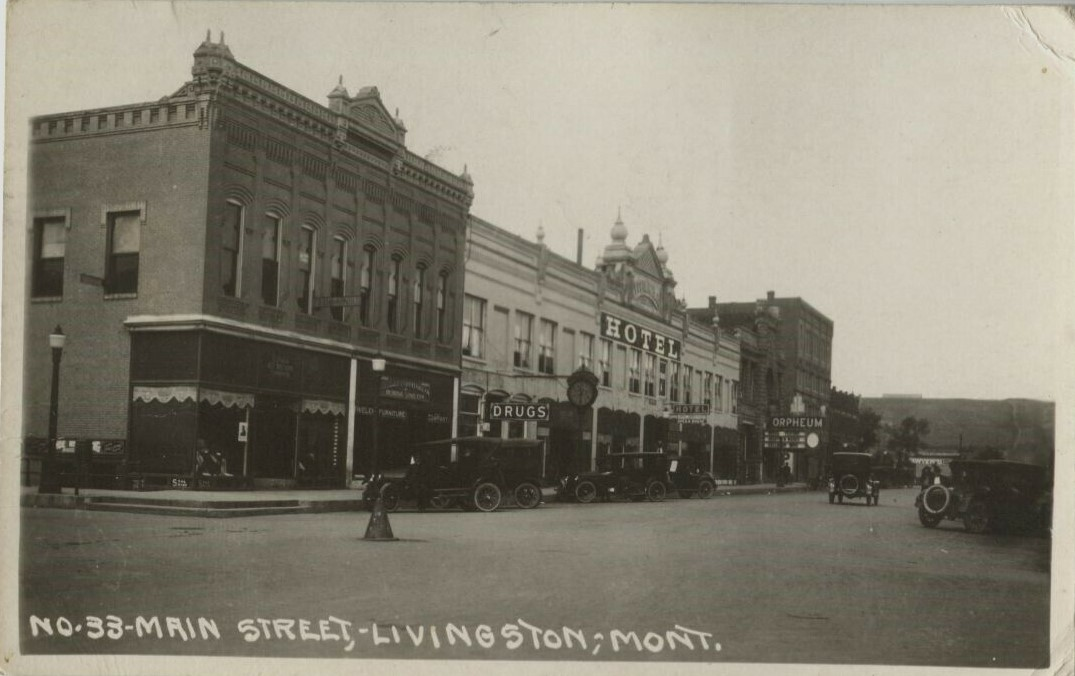
Livingston, Montana's Main Street was shown on a postcard mailed in 1924.

=== Clark City ===
Downstream the Yellowstone River, about 3 miles (4.8 km) from present-day Livingston, an old fisherman named Amos Benson built a log cabin in 1872. This is where a ferry, a trading post and a small community called Benson's Landing were located. Across the river from Benson's Landing in June 1882 was the camp of about 40 tents of the Northern Pacific survey crew. This is where they thought the supply store site they were looking for should be. On July 14, 1882, a man who worked for the Northern Pacific named Joseph J. McBride arrived with orders to find another site to build the store. On July 16, George H. Carver, who became a major local businessman and political leader, arrived at the site of present-day Livingston. Carver and McBride became the first local residents when they pitched their tents on the 16th. Also on the 16th arrived 30 freight wagons drawn by 140 oxen, carrying 140,000 lbs. of merchandise. The supply store was to be of Bruns and Kruntz, contractors. Eventually, the tents gave way to log cabins. All of Benson's Landing encampment moved up the river to Carver and McBride's camp within 10 days of the train's arrival.

This new settlement was called "Clark City" after Heman Clark, the principal contractor for the Northern Pacific from the Missouri westward. By fall, the town was well established and a November 1882 poll counted 348 votes for delegates to congress. Clark City was on the southeast side at the East end of Lewis St. just southwest of the KPRK, and is now part of Livingston. B.F. Downen built the first permanent residence (out of wood) and Frank White owned the first saloon. Clark City eventually had 6 general stores, 2 hotels, 2 restaurants, 2 watchmakers, 2 wholesale liquor dealers, 2 meat markets, 3 blacksmiths, 1 hardware store, 30 saloons and a population of 500.

As Clark City was growing, nobody realized that the Northern Pacific had marked on its maps a town called Livingston at the same place. The railroad officially reached Clark City on November 22, 1882. In October 1882 a post office was chartered for Clark City. In November, Livingston received its charter. That was when it was decided that Livingston be located a short distance away. Then Clark City residents bought lots in Livingston and moved. The birth of Livingston was the death of Clark City. The walking distance between them was considerable and Clark City became stream-and-bog urban wildland. Very few buildings still remain.

=== Incorporation ===
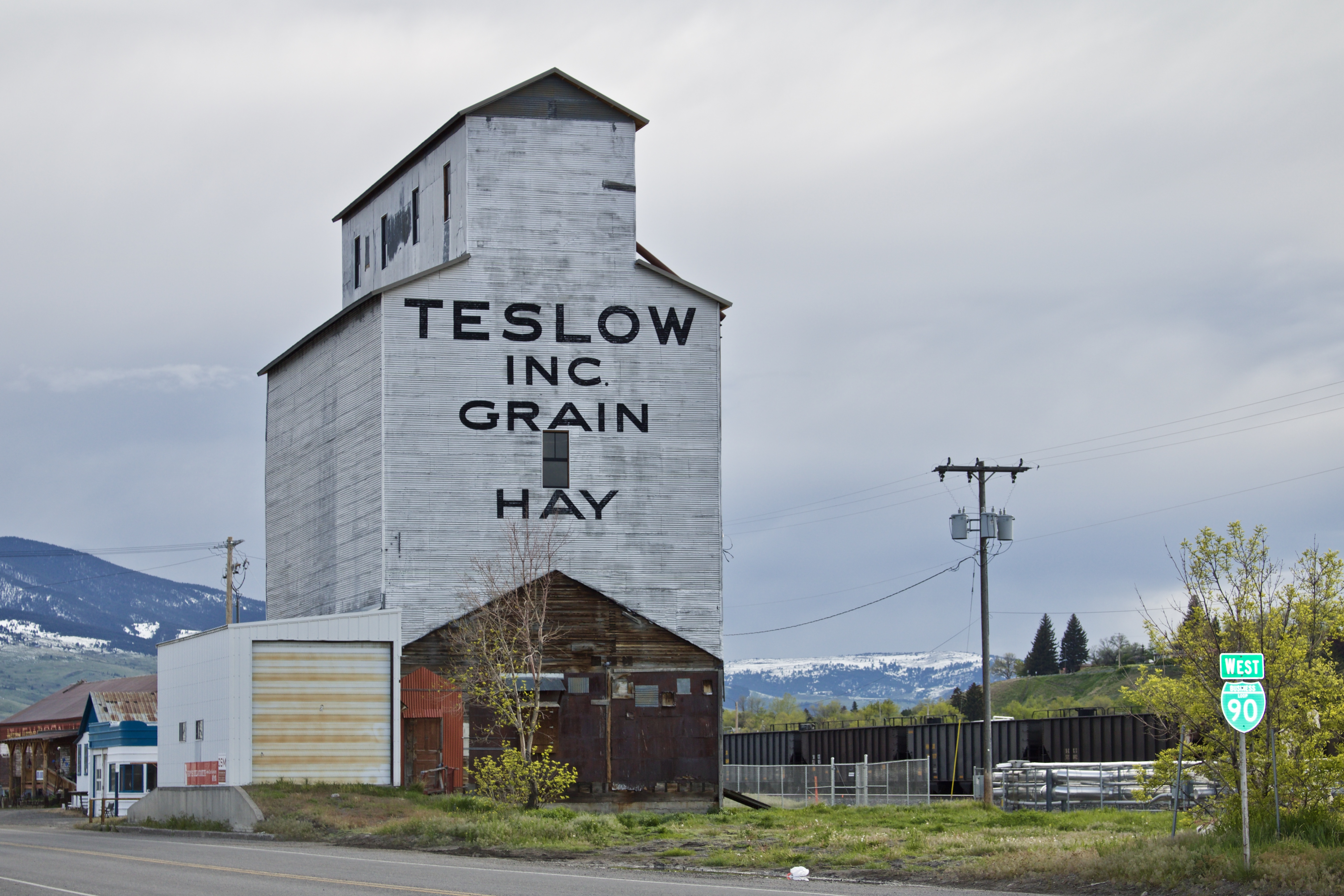
Teslow Grain Elevator, along the railroad tracks

On December 21, 1882, Livingston was incorporated and named in honor of Johnston Livingston, pioneer Northern Pacific Railway stockholder, director and friend of Northern Pacific Railroad President Henry Villard. Johnston Livingston was director from 1875 to 1881 and 1884–1887. Crawford Livingston Jr., Johnston's nephew, is more commonly considered the town's namesake. Crawford bought the real estate after the survey and on July 17, 1883, established the First National Bank in the city. Often he spoke of Livingston as "his town," and he apparently enjoyed the publicity of supposedly having a city named for him. But the name Livingston has always stood out in the Northern Pacific official family.

Livingston is along the Yellowstone River, where it bends from north to east toward Billings and in proximity to Interstate 90. In July 1806 Captain William Clark of the Lewis and Clark Expedition camped on the city's present outskirts on the return trip east preparing to descend the Yellowstone River. Clark's party rejoined the Lewis party at the confluence with the Missouri River, near Williston, North Dakota.

=== Attractions ===
Although small, Livingston has a number of popular tourist attractions. The Livingston Depot, built in 1902 after two predecessors, is a restored rail station that houses a railroad museum open from May to September. The Yellowstone Gateway Museum documents regional history from one of the oldest North American archaeological sites to Wild Western and Yellowstone history. The International Fly Fishing Federation's museum is an extensive introduction to a popular game sport and hosts annual enthusiast meetings. The city was inhabited for two decades by Calamity Jane and visited by a number of traveling members of European royalty.

In 1938, Dan Bailey, an eastern fly-fisherman, established Dan Bailey's Fly Shop and mail order fly tying business on Park Street. Also in Livingston is the Fly Fishing Discovery Center, a museum operated by the Federation of Fly Fishers.

Its economy is flat, and like the rest of the state, the unemployment rate is below the national average. Recently the city has invested in attractions and accommodation for tourists visiting during the Lewis and Clark bicentennial years.

Livingston and its immediately adjacent area has 17 sites listed on the National Register of Historic Places, enumerated within Park County's NRHP listings.

On October 21, 1991, the city of Livingston adopted a sister-city relationship with Naganohara, Japan.

Images of Livingston, Montana

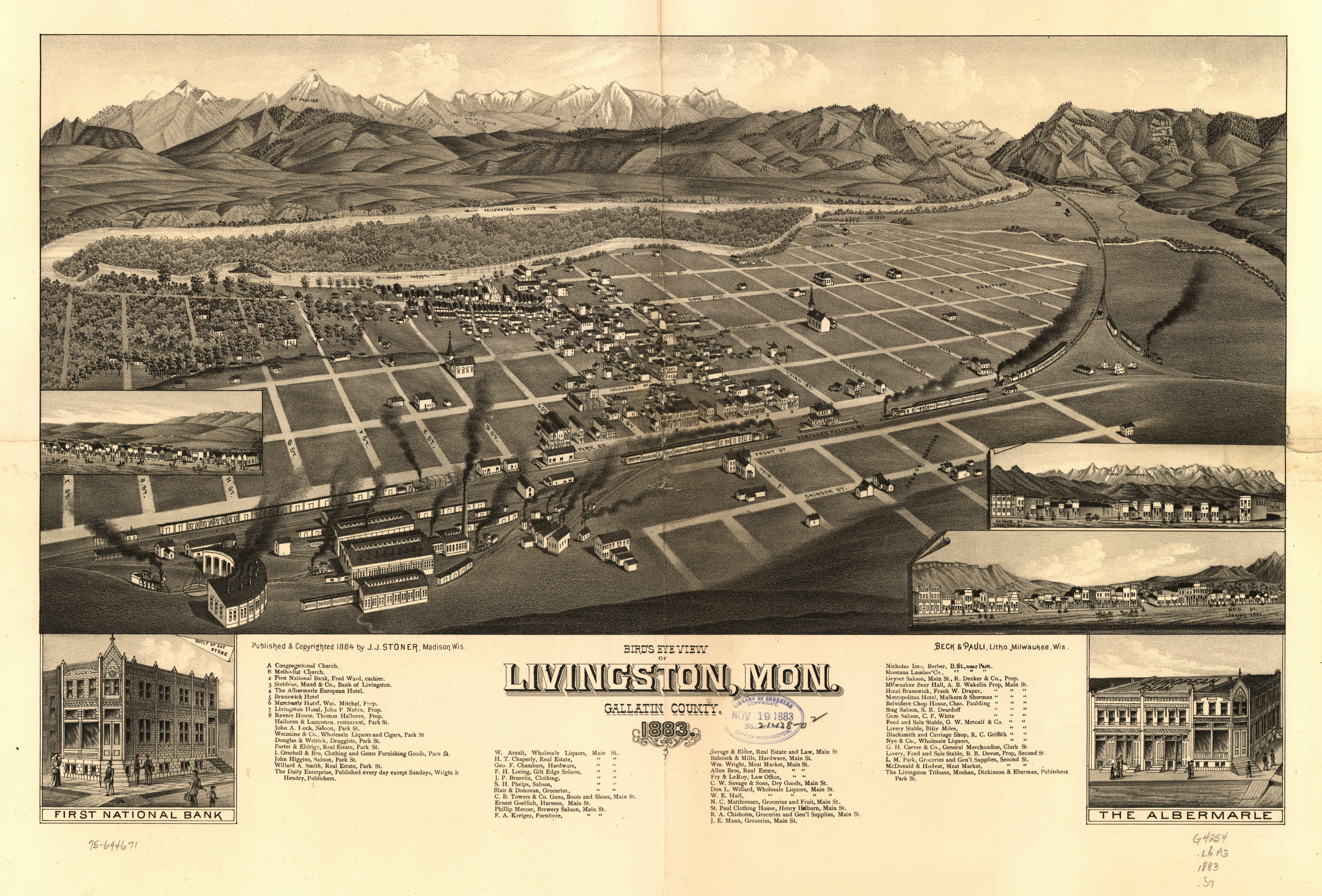
Plat of Livingston, 1883

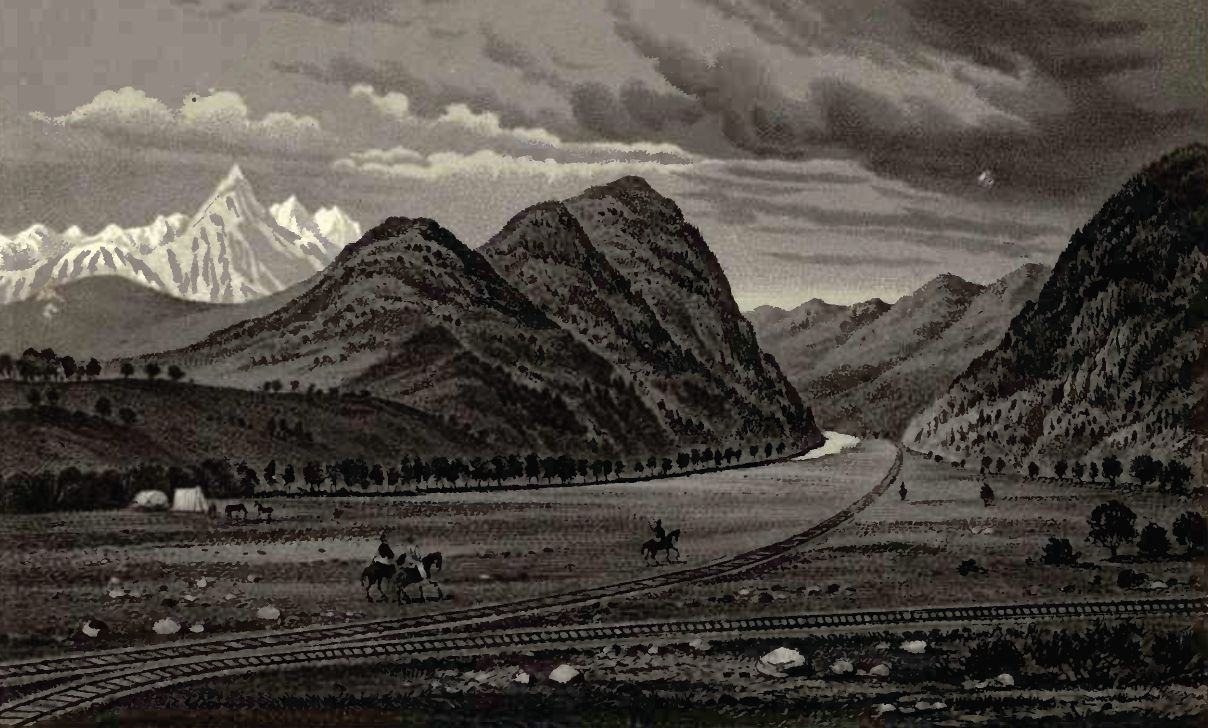
Gateway to Yellowstone, Frank Jay Haynes, 1884

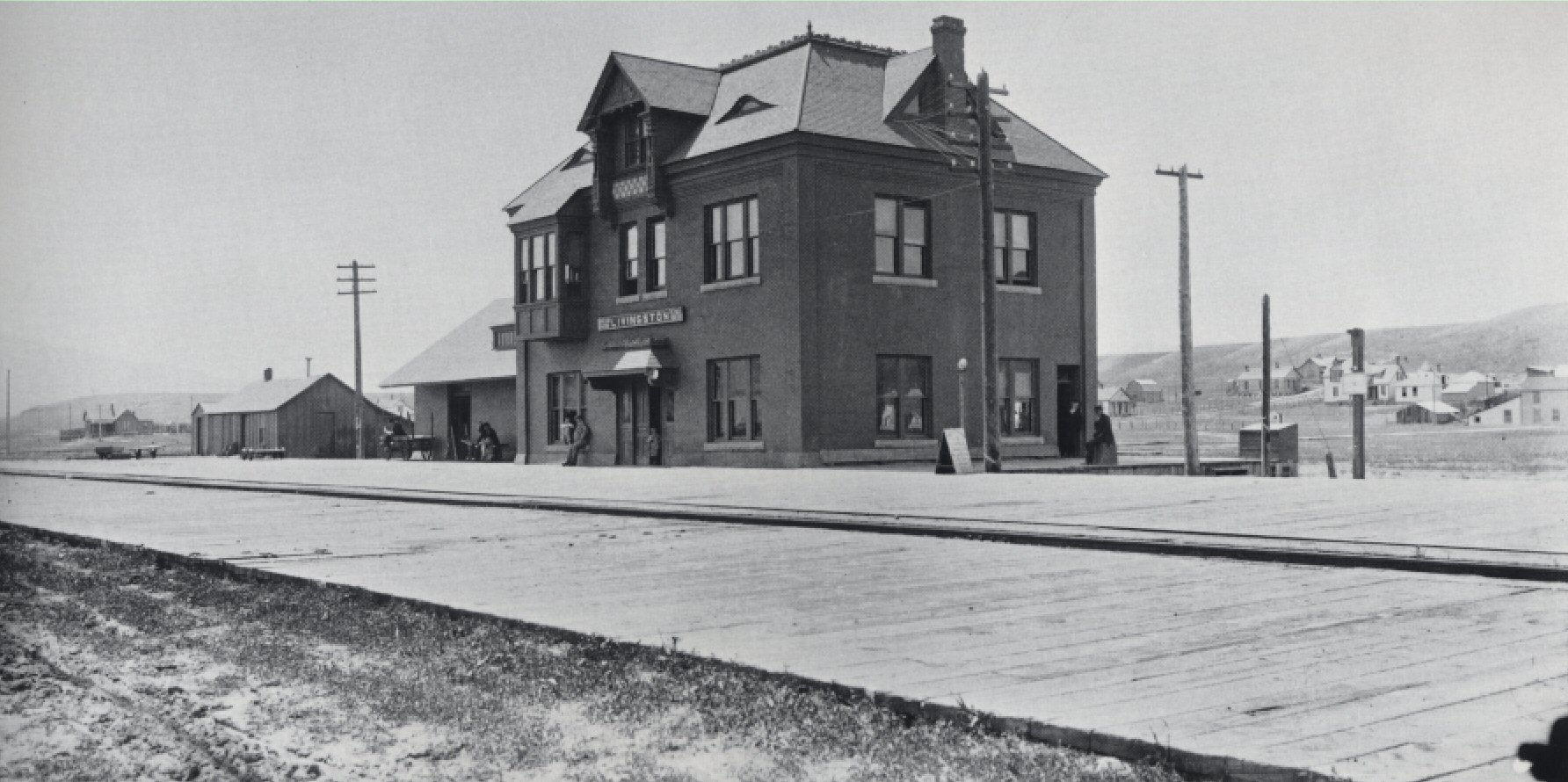
Second Livingston NPRR Depot, 1894

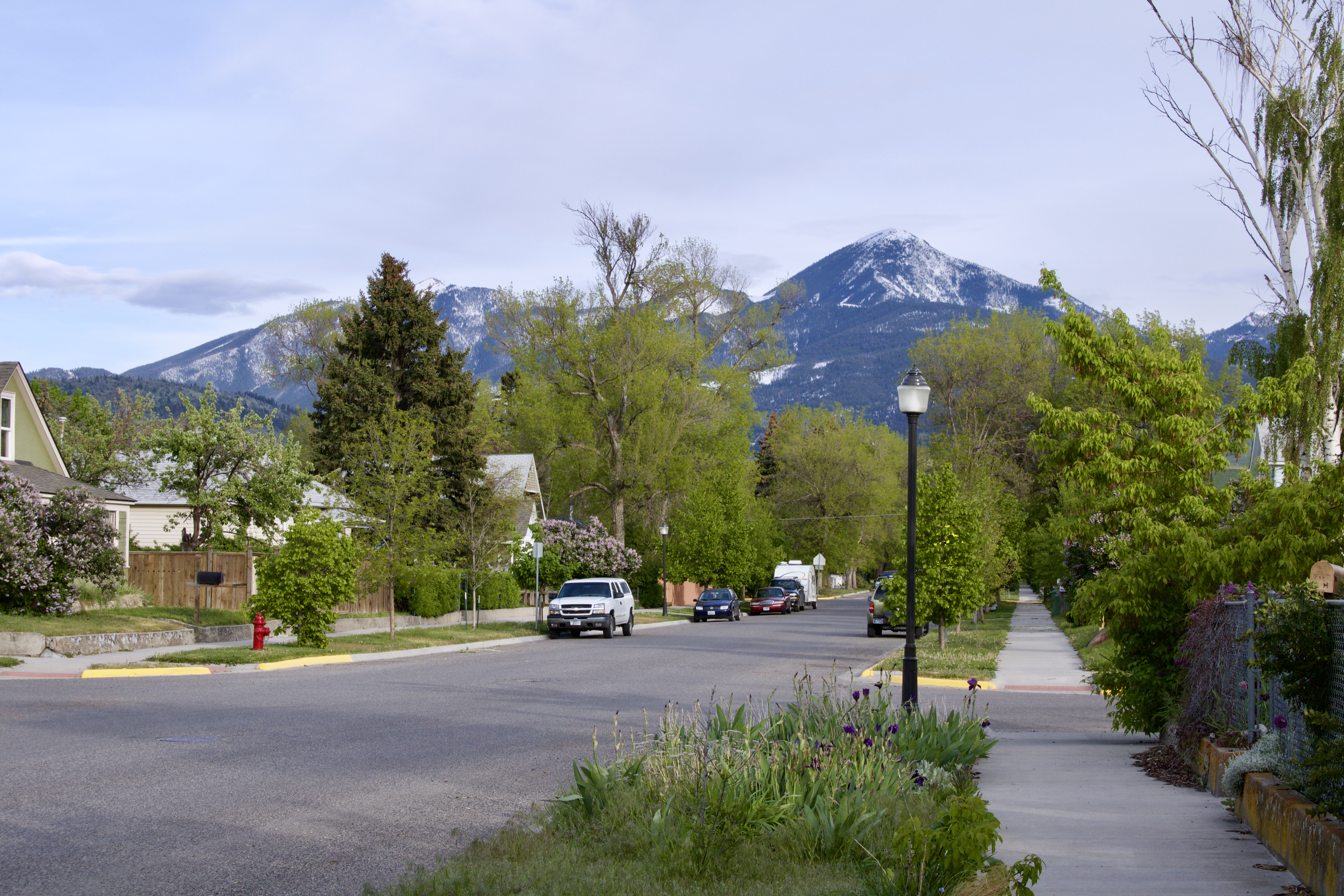
Residential neighborhood

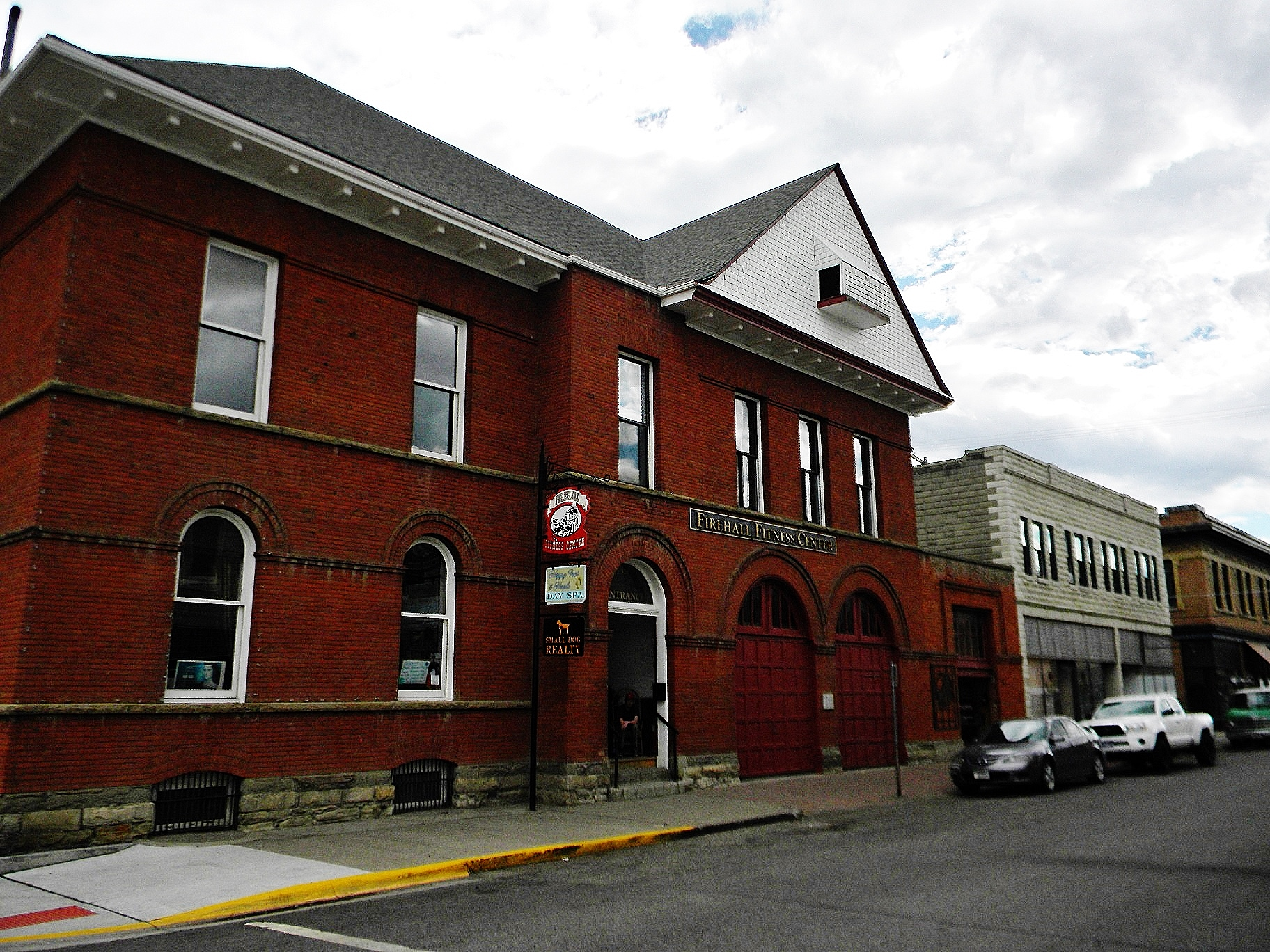
Fire station reimagined as fitness center

== Geography ==
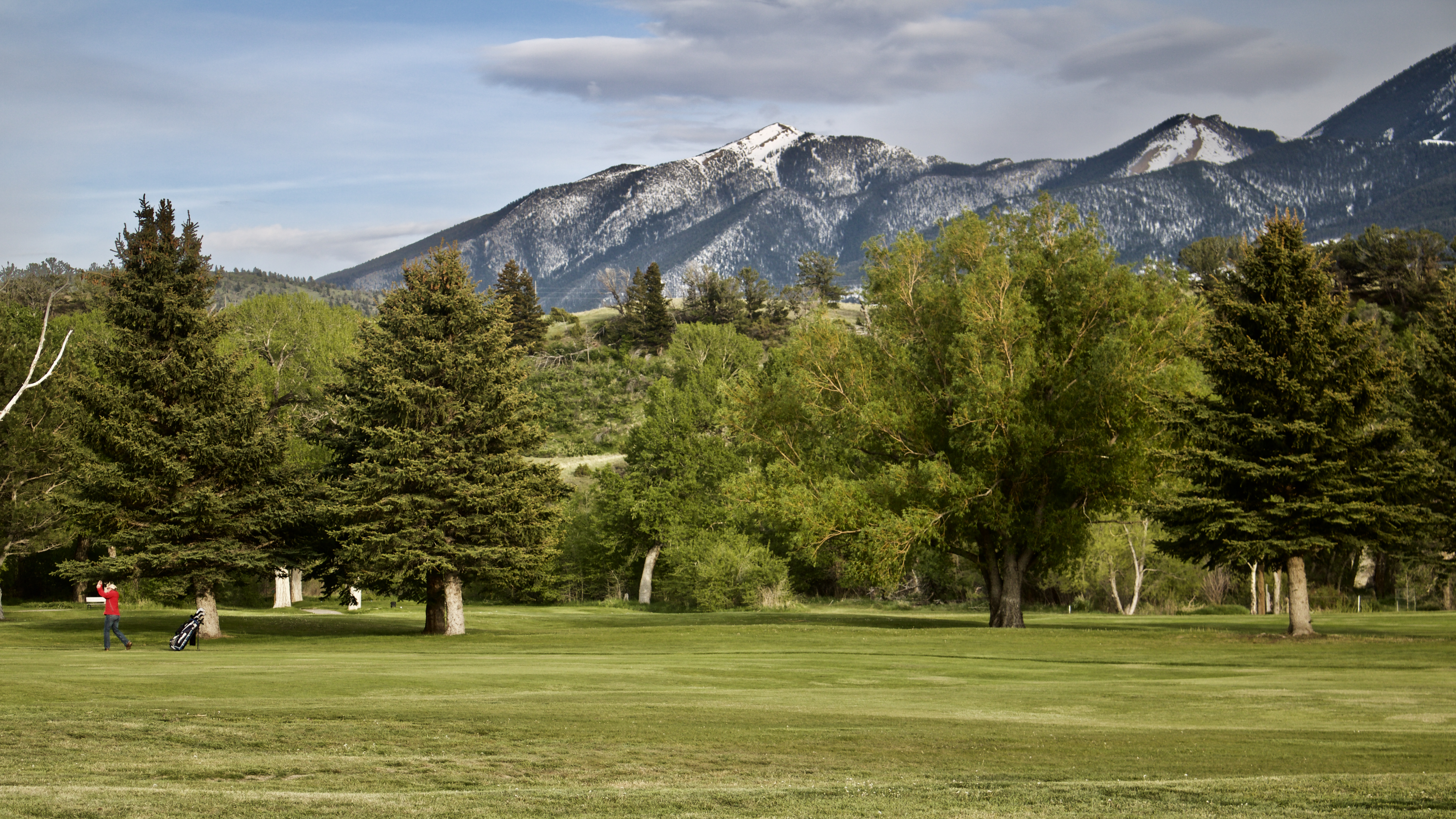
Golf course, Livingston, Montana

According to the United States Census Bureau, the city has a total area of 6.03 square miles (15.62 km^{2}), of which 6.02 square miles (15.59 km^{2}) is land and 0.01 square miles (0.03 km^{2}) is water.

=== Climate ===
According to the Köppen Climate Classification system, Livingston has a warm-summer humid continental climate, abbreviated "Dfb" on climate maps.

Climate data for Livingston, Montana (Mission Field), 1991–2020 normals, extremes 1948–present
Month	Jan	Feb	Mar	Apr	May	Jun	Jul	Aug	Sep	Oct	Nov	Dec	Year
Record high °F (°C)	67 (19)	70 (21)	79 (26)	86 (30)	93 (34)	99 (37)	105 (41)	105 (41)	102 (39)	91 (33)	77 (25)	64 (18)	105 (41)
Mean maximum °F (°C)	55.7 (13.2)	57.3 (14.1)	67.6 (19.8)	76.2 (24.6)	82.5 (28.1)	91.0 (32.8)	97.8 (36.6)	97.0 (36.1)	92.3 (33.5)	80.8 (27.1)	65.3 (18.5)	55.5 (13.1)	99.1 (37.3)
Mean daily maximum °F (°C)	37.4 (3.0)	38.9 (3.8)	47.8 (8.8)	54.4 (12.4)	64.4 (18.0)	73.8 (23.2)	85.7 (29.8)	84.8 (29.3)	73.5 (23.1)	58.2 (14.6)	44.9 (7.2)	36.4 (2.4)	58.4 (14.6)
Daily mean °F (°C)	28.1 (−2.2)	28.9 (−1.7)	36.1 (2.3)	42.2 (5.7)	51.0 (10.6)	59.3 (15.2)	67.9 (19.9)	66.5 (19.2)	57.3 (14.1)	45.5 (7.5)	35.1 (1.7)	27.6 (−2.4)	45.5 (7.5)
Mean daily minimum °F (°C)	18.8 (−7.3)	18.9 (−7.3)	24.3 (−4.3)	30.0 (−1.1)	37.6 (3.1)	44.8 (7.1)	50.2 (10.1)	48.1 (8.9)	41.2 (5.1)	32.7 (0.4)	25.3 (−3.7)	18.8 (−7.3)	32.6 (0.3)
Mean minimum °F (°C)	−9.4 (−23.0)	−6.9 (−21.6)	1.2 (−17.1)	14.8 (−9.6)	23.2 (−4.9)	33.6 (0.9)	40.0 (4.4)	36.9 (2.7)	27.1 (−2.7)	11.6 (−11.3)	−1.7 (−18.7)	−8.7 (−22.6)	−20.5 (−29.2)
Record low °F (°C)	−32 (−36)	−33 (−36)	−32 (−36)	−2 (−19)	11 (−12)	27 (−3)	33 (1)	28 (−2)	10 (−12)	−12 (−24)	−31 (−35)	−41 (−41)	−41 (−41)
Average precipitation inches (mm)	0.44 (11)	0.47 (12)	0.79 (20)	1.71 (43)	2.66 (68)	2.42 (61)	1.31 (33)	1.07 (27)	1.20 (30)	1.36 (35)	0.62 (16)	0.50 (13)	14.55 (369)
Average snowfall inches (cm)	10.4 (26)	6.2 (16)	7.3 (19)	7.6 (19)	2.5 (6.4)	0.0 (0.0)	0.0 (0.0)	0.0 (0.0)	0.9 (2.3)	5.1 (13)	7.5 (19)	8.5 (22)	56.0 (142)
Average precipitation days (≥ 0.01 in)	5.5	6.5	8.4	11.8	13.6	12.9	9.2	7.8	7.5	9.5	7.1	6.3	106.1
Average snowy days (≥ 0.1 in)	5.4	4.8	6.6	6.9	1.2	0.1	0.0	0.0	0.9	3.4	5.2	5.4	39.9
Source 1: NOAA
Source 2: National Weather Service

Livingston has some of the warmest winters in the state, but the temperature can feel cold because Livingston is also one of the windiest places in the United States, having the 2nd highest average wind speed among airport/AMOS stations from 2000 to 2010, after Guadalupe Pass, a highway station near Pine Springs, Texas.

== Demographics ==
Historical population
Census	Pop.	Note	%±
1890	2,850		—
1900	2,778		−2.5%
1910	5,259		89.3%
1920	6,311		20.0%
1930	6,391		1.3%
1940	6,642		3.9%
1950	7,683		15.7%
1960	8,229		7.1%
1970	6,883		−16.4%
1980	6,994		1.6%
1990	6,701		−4.2%
2000	6,851		2.2%
2010	7,044		2.8%
2020	8,040		14.1%
U.S. Decennial Census

=== 2020 census ===
As of the 2020 census, Livingston had a population of 8,040. The median age was 42.5 years. 18.1% of residents were under the age of 18 and 20.6% of residents were 65 years of age or older. For every 100 females there were 99.3 males, and for every 100 females age 18 and over there were 96.5 males age 18 and over.

99.5% of residents lived in urban areas, while 0.5% lived in rural areas.

There were 3,833 households in Livingston, of which 22.3% had children under the age of 18 living in them. Of all households, 37.8% were married-couple households, 23.8% were households with a male householder and no spouse or partner present, and 28.9% were households with a female householder and no spouse or partner present. About 39.7% of all households were made up of individuals and 16.7% had someone living alone who was 65 years of age or older.

There were 4,130 housing units, of which 7.2% were vacant. The homeowner vacancy rate was 1.3% and the rental vacancy rate was 4.6%.

Racial composition as of the 2020 census
Race	Number	Percent
White	7,349	91.4%
Black or African American	28	0.3%
American Indian and Alaska Native	77	1.0%
Asian	39	0.5%
Native Hawaiian and Other Pacific Islander	0	0.0%
Some other race	64	0.8%
Two or more races	483	6.0%
Hispanic or Latino (of any race)	270	3.4%

=== 2010 census ===
As of the census of 2010, there were 7,044 people, 3,356 households, and 1,744 families living in the city. The population density was 1,170.1 inhabitants per square mile (451.8/km^{2}). There were 3,779 housing units at an average density of 627.7 per square mile (242.4/km^{2}). The racial makeup of the city was 96.2% White, 0.1% African American, 0.8% Native American, 0.3% Asian, 0.6% from other races, and 2.0% from two or more races. Hispanic or Latino of any race were 2.5% of the population.

There were 3,356 households, of which 24.7% had children under the age of 18 living with them, 39.2% were married couples living together, 9.1% had a female householder with no husband present, 3.7% had a male householder with no wife present, and 48.0% were non-families. 40.4% of all households were made up of individuals, and 14.3% had someone living alone who was 65 years of age or older. The average household size was 2.07 and the average family size was 2.81.

The median age in the city was 41.1 years. 21% of residents were under the age of 18; 5.6% were between the ages of 18 and 24; 28.3% were from 25 to 44; 28.9% were from 45 to 64; and 16.2% were 65 years of age or older. The gender makeup of the city was 48.5% male and 51.5% female.

=== 2000 census ===
At the 2000 census, there were 6,851 people, 3,084 households and 1,751 families living in the city. The population density was 2,601.3 inhabitants per square mile (1,004.4/km^{2}). There were 3,360 housing units at an average density of 1,275.8 per square mile (492.6/km^{2}). The racial makeup of the city was 96.39% White, 0.31% African American, 0.98% Native American, 0.50% Asian, 0.60% from other races, and 1.23% from two or more races. Hispanic or Latino of any race were 2.16% of the population.

There were 3,084 households, of which 26.7% had children under the age of 18 living with them, 43.8% were married couples living together, 9.1% had a female householder with no husband present, and 43.2% were non-families. 37.5% of all households were made up of individuals, and 15.6% had someone living alone who was 65 years of age or older. The average household size was 2.16 and the average family size was 2.86.

Age distribution was 22.7% under the age of 18, 7.5% from 18 to 24, 27.5% from 25 to 44, 23.6% from 45 to 64, and 18.6% who were 65 years of age or older. The median age was 40 years. For every 100 females, there were 95.0 males. For every 100 females age 18 and over, there were 90.7 males.

The median household income was $28,980, and the median family income was $40,505. Males had a median income of $26,619 versus $18,684 for females. The per capita income for the city was $16,636. About 5.6% of families and 12.1% of the population were below the poverty line, including 15.0% of those under age 18 and 10.4% of those age 65 or over.

== Economy ==
A railroad city until the mid-1980s, the city today depends significantly on tourism. Fly Fishers International is based in Livingston.

According to Livingston's Fiscal Year 2025 Annual Comprehensive Financial Report, the top private employers in Park County (the city's website refers to approximately a hundred public employees) are:

#	Employer	# of Employees
1	Xanterra Parks & Resorts, Inc.	500–999
2	Livingston HealthCare	250–499
3	Albertsons	100–249
4	Chico Hot Springs Resort	100–249
5	Express Color Printing, Inc.	100–249
6	Mountain Sky Guest Ranch	100–249
7	Church Universal and Triumphant	50–99
8	Fusion Medical Staffing, LLC	50–99
9	Sun Mountain Lumber Co, Inc.	50–99
10	Town & Country Foods	50–99

== Education ==
The CDP is almost entirely in the Livingston Elementary School District. The CDP slightly extends into the Pine Creek Elementary School District. All of the CDP is in the Park High School District. Both Livingston Elementary School District and Park High School District are components of Livingston Public Schools.

Livingston Public Schools educates students from kindergarten through 12th grade. Park High School's team name is the Rangers.

Livingston has a public library, the Livingston-Park County Public Library.

== Infrastructure ==
Mission Field is a public use airport located 5 miles (8.0 km) east of town.

Intercity bus service to the city is provided by Jefferson Lines.

== Media ==
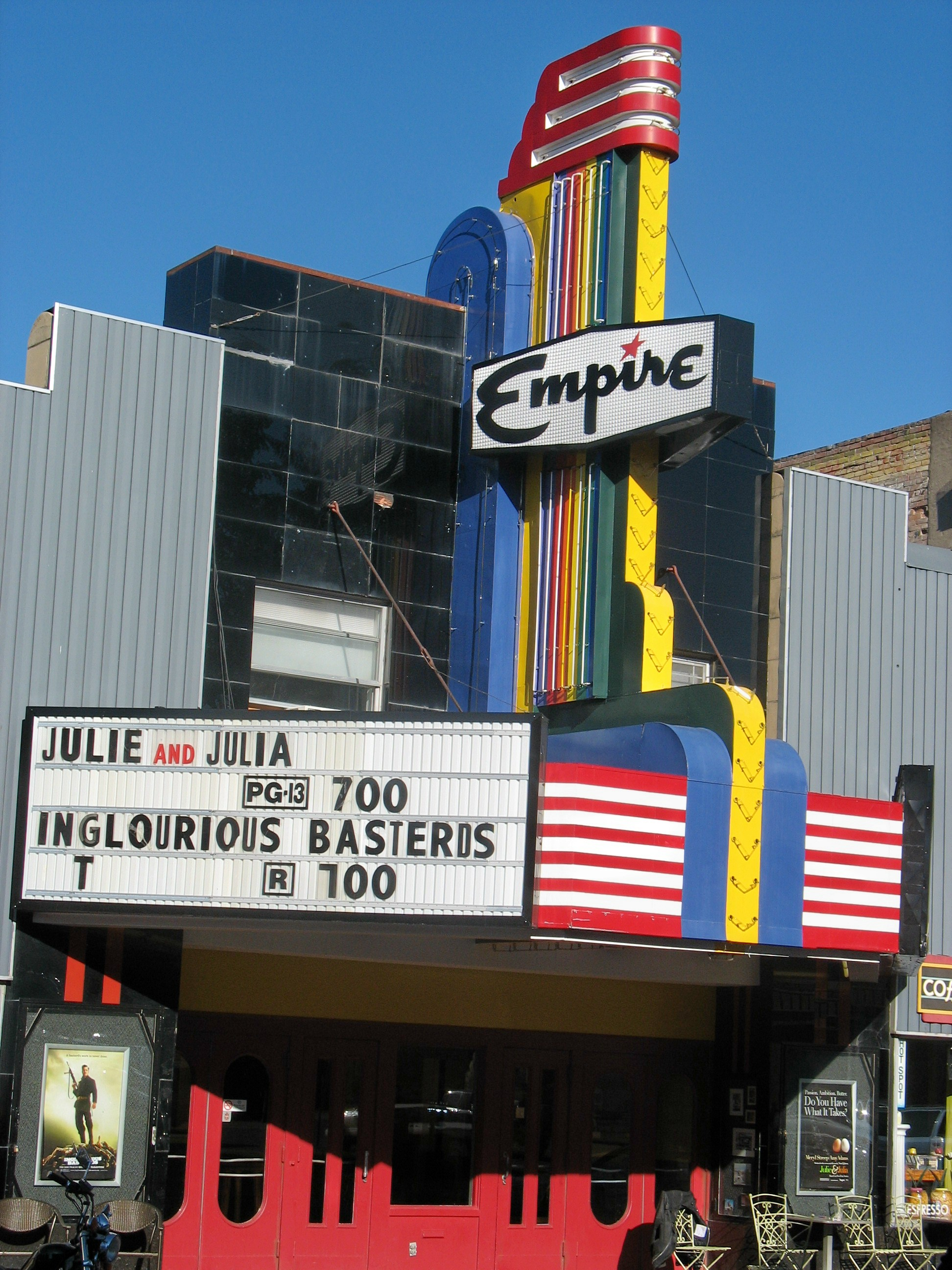
Empire Theater downtown

=== Newspapers ===
The Livingston Enterprise is a local daily newspaper. The monthly Montana Pioneer and bimonthly Atlantis Rising are also Livingston-based. The Park County Community Journal, a free newspaper providing area-wide coverage, is based in Livingston.

=== AM radio ===
- KBOZ 1090, (Talk/personality), Reier Broadcasting Company
- KOBB 1230, (Sports talk), Reier Broadcasting Company
- KPRK AM 1340, (Talk), GapWest Broadcasting
- KMMS 1450, (News/talk), GapWest Broadcasting

=== FM radio ===
- KLEU 91.1, (Christian music/talk programming), Hi-Line Radio Fellowship
- KGLT 91.9, (Variety), Montana State University-Bozeman
- KOBB-FM 93.7, (Oldies), Reier Broadcasting Company
- KMMS-FM 94.7, (Adult album), GapWest Broadcasting
- KISN 96.7, (Top 40 (CHR)), GapWest Broadcasting
- KOZB 97.5, (Classic rock), Reier Broadcasting Company
- KBOZ-FM 99.9, (Country music), Reier Broadcasting Company
- KXLB 100.7, (Country music), GapWest Broadcasting
- KBMC (FM) 102.1, (Variety), Montana State University-Billings
- KZMY 103.5, (Hot adult contemporary), GapWest Broadcasting
- KBZM 104.7, (Classic hits), Orion Media
- KSCY 106.9, (Country music), Orion Media

=== Bozeman Market ===
- KTVM 6 NBC, Bonten Media Group
- KBZK 7 CBS, Evening Post Publishing Company
- KUSM 9 PBS, Montana State University

=== Billings Market ===
- KULR 8 NBC, Cowles Montana Media
- KTVQ-TV 2 CBS, Evening Post Publishing Company

== Filmography ==
The city of Livingston has been a staging area or location for a number of films, including:

- Rancho Deluxe, 1975
- Amazing Grace and Chuck, 1987
- A River Runs Through It, 1992
- The Horse Whisperer, 1998
- Cowboys vs. Dinosaurs, 2015
- Certain Women, 2016
- Walking Out, 2017
- Wildlife (film), 2018
- Montana Story, 2021

=== Set in Livingston ===
- Yellowstone (American TV series), 2018-2024

== Notable people ==
- Dan Bailey, renowned fly tyer and owner of Dan Bailey's Fly Shop
- Arthur Blank, owner of Paradise Valley Pop Stand and Grill and Mountain Sky Guest Ranch
- Ed Bouchee, major league baseball first baseman
- Tom Brokaw, television journalist
- Tim Cahill, travel writer
- Calamity Jane, cavalry scout, western heroine
- Russell Chatham, landscape artist
- Michael Dahlquist, drummer for the band Silkworm
- Al Feldstein, comic artist and painter
- Mayhew Foster, World War II pilot who transported Hermann Göring
- Chad Franscoviak, sound engineer
- Cassidy Freeman, actress
- Eduardo Garcia, chef and businessman
- Thomas Goltz, journalist and author
- Rich Hall, comedian, writer and musician
- Jim Harrison, poet and author (Legends of the Fall)
- Torey Hayden, psychologist and author
- William Hjortsberg, author and screenwriter (Falling Angel, Legend (1985 film))
- Margot Kidder, actress
- Walter Kirn, novelist
- Thomas Leforge, mid-19th century liaison to and resident among the Crow Tribe
- Pete Lovely, race car driver
- John Mayer, musician
- Thomas McGuane, writer, novelist, film director, screenwriter
- Ken Niles, radio announcer and actor (Out of the Past)
- Wendell Niles, radio announcer, actor
- James F. O'Connor, United States Representative from Montana
- Christopher Paolini, author of The Inheritance Cycle
- Doug Peacock, author, grizzly bear expert.
- Sam Peckinpah, film director; resided at the Murray Hotel from 1979 to 1984
- Lester Thurow, economist, author and Rhodes Scholar
