= KMMS =

KMMS may refer to:

- KMMS (AM), a radio station (1450 AM) licensed to serve Bozeman, Montana, United States
- KMMS-FM, a radio station (94.7 FM) licensed to serve Bozeman, Montana
- Kent and Medway Medical School, a medical school based in Canterbury, Kent, United Kingdom
