= Yellowstone River =

River in the western United States

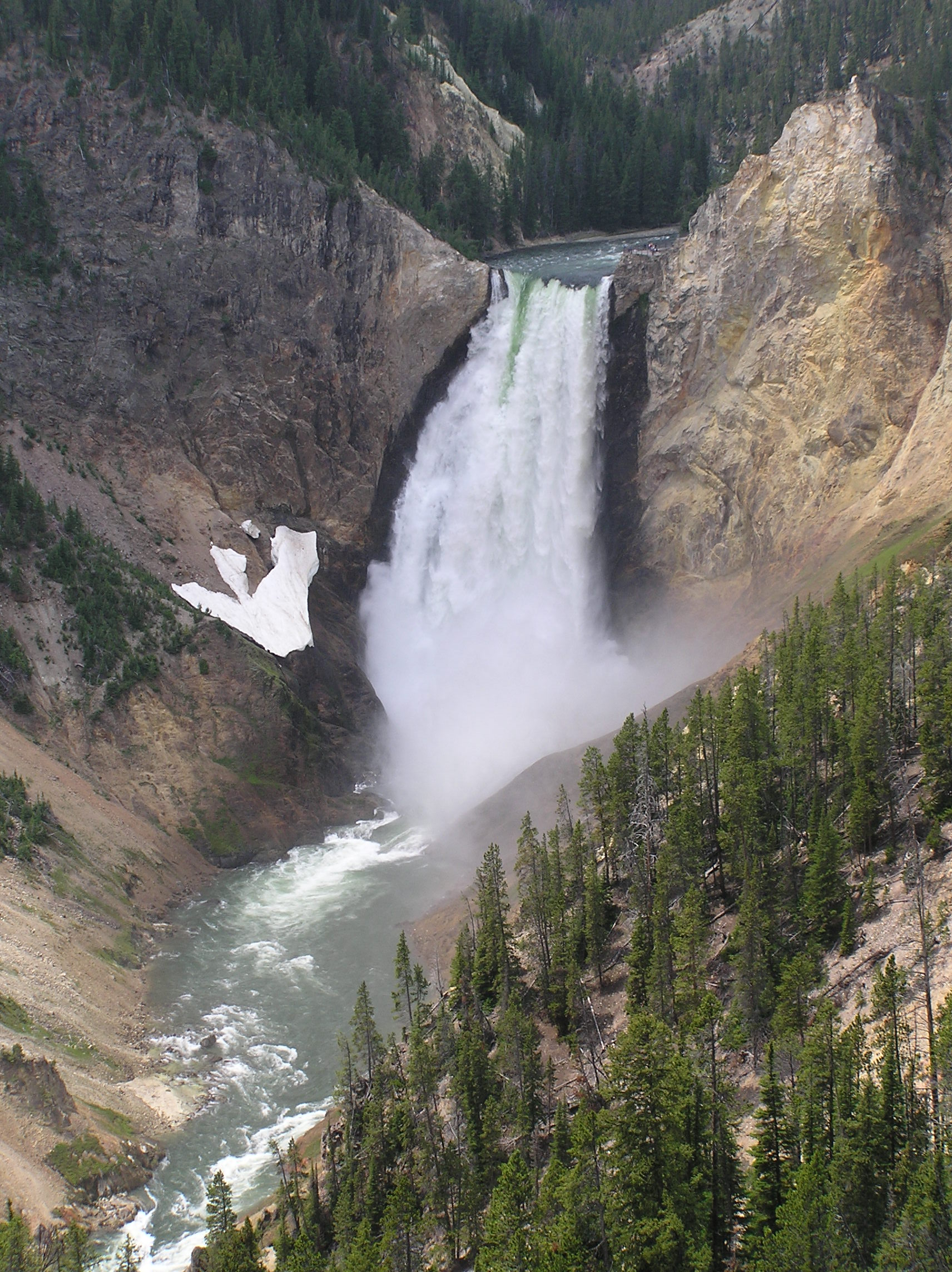
- Yellowstone Falls on the Yellowstone River in Yellowstone National Park

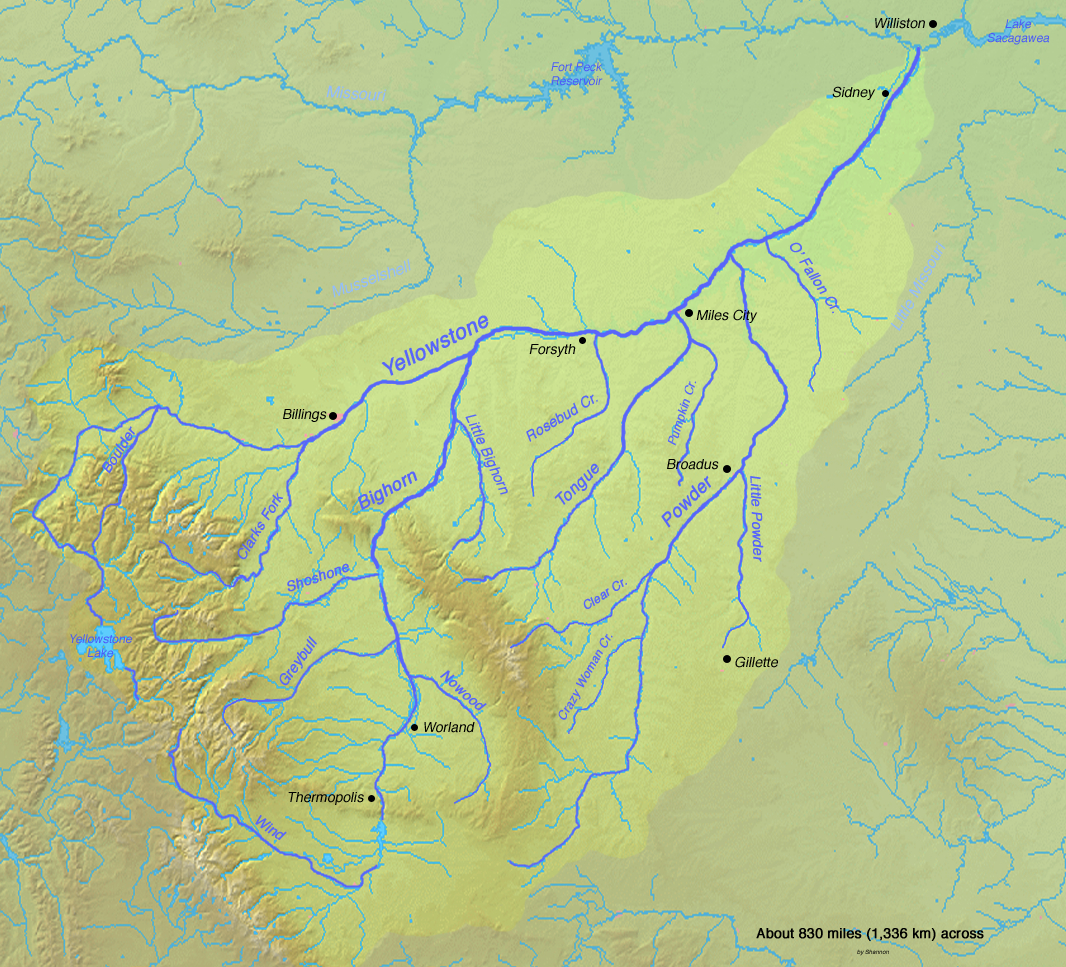
- Map of the Yellowstone River watershed

Location
- Country: United States of America
- State: Wyoming, Montana, North Dakota

Physical characteristics
- Source: Confluence of North and South Forks
  - location: Absaroka Range, Wyoming
  - coordinates: 43°59′18″N 109°55′45″W
- Mouth: Missouri River
  - location: McKenzie County, near Buford, North Dakota
  - coordinates: 47°58′42″N 103°58′56″W
- Length: 692 mi (1,114 km)
- Basin size: 70,000 sq mi (180,000 km^{2})
- Discharge
  - location: Sidney, MT
  - average: 13,773 cu ft/s (390.0 m^{3}/s)
  - minimum: 3,108 cu ft/s (88.0 m^{3}/s)
  - maximum: 159,000 cu ft/s (4,500 m^{3}/s)

Basin features
- Tributaries
  - left: Gardner River, Shields River
  - right: Lamar River, Boulder River, Stillwater River, Bighorn River, Tongue River, Powder River

The Yellowstone River is a tributary of the Missouri River, approximately 671 miles (1,080 km) long, in the Western United States. Considered the principal tributary of the upper Missouri, via its own tributaries it drains an area with headwaters across the mountains and high plains of southern Montana and northern Wyoming, and stretching east from the Rocky Mountains in the vicinity of Yellowstone National Park. It flows northeast to its confluence with the Missouri River on the North Dakota side of the border, about 25 miles (40 km) west of Williston.

== Etymology ==
The name is widely believed to have been derived from the Minnetaree Indian name Mi tse a-da-zi (Yellow Rock River) (Hidatsa: miʔciiʔriaashiish'). Common lore recounts that the name was inspired by the yellow-colored rocks along the Grand Canyon of the Yellowstone, but the Minnetaree never lived along the upper stretches of the Yellowstone. Some scholars think that the river was instead named after yellow-colored sandstone bluffs on the lower Yellowstone.

The Cheyenne, who lived in the areas of present-day Billings and Yellowstone County, called it Mo'éheo'hé'e (also Yellow Rocks River). The Crow, who lived along the upper Yellowstone in southern Montana, called it E-chee-dik-karsh-ah-shay (Elk River). Translating the Minnetaree name, French trappers in the area referred to the river as Roche Jaune (Yellow Rock), a name adopted by ethnic American, French and other European mountain men until the mid-19th century.

Independently, Lewis and Clark recorded the English translation of Yellow Stone for the river after they encountered the Minnetaree in 1805. With expanding settlement by English-speaking people from the United States, the English name eventually became the most widely used. The river was explored in 1806 by William Clark as the Lewis and Clark Expedition returned east from the Pacific Coast. The Clark's Fork of the river was named after him.

Most of the natural features of the Yellowstone Valley not already named by Lewis and Clark were named by pioneer steamboat captain Grant Marsh. Marsh was selected by the Army for an exploratory expedition in 1873 on his riverboat Key West. The team was commanded by Brevet Brig. Gen. George Alexander Forsyth. Marsh kept a detailed log during the journey. The names he bestowed were recorded by an expedition representative of the War Department and applied to official maps; they include the following:

- Forsyth Butte, named in honor of Forsyth, commander of the expedition.
- Cut Nose Butte, Chimney Rock, and Diamond Island, for their resemblance to these objects.
- Seven Sisters Islands, in remembrance of Captain Marsh's seven sisters.
- Crittenden Island, for General T. L. Crittenden, who commanded the 17th Infantry, which was garrisoned at posts along the Missouri River.
- Mary Island, for the chambermaid on the Key West, wife of the steward, "Dutch Jake."
- Reno Island, for Major Marcus A. Reno, of the 7th Cavalry.
- Schindel Island, for Major M. Bryant, commanding the escort for the Key West.
- Edgerly Island, for Lieutenant W. S. Edgerly of the 7th Cavalry.
- Monroe Island, for Captain Marsh's brother, Monroe Marsh.
- DeRussy Rapids, for Isaac D. DeRussy, later lieutenant-colonel of the 14th Infantry.
- McCune Rapids (later misspelled "McKeon" on maps), for one of Marsh's longtime friends in St. Louis.
- Barr's Bluff, for another Marsh friend.
- Stanley's Point, for the colonel of the 22nd Infantry.
- Sheridan's Buttes, for Lt. Gen. Philip Sheridan.

== Watershed ==
The Yellowstone River watershed is a river basin spanning 37,167 square miles (96,260 km^{2}) across Montana, with minor extensions into Wyoming and North Dakota, toward headwaters and terminus, respectively. The Yellowstone Basin watershed contains a system of rivers, including the Yellowstone River, and four tributary basins: the Clarks Fork Yellowstone, Wind River and Bighorn River, Tongue River, and Powder River. These rivers form tributaries to the Missouri River. The actual headwaters of the Yellowstone River occur in high alpine terrain in the east-southeast reaches of Wyoming's Teton Wilderness Area near its boundary with the Washakie Wilderness Area.

The mainstem of the Yellowstone River is more than 700 miles (1,100 km) long. At the headwaters, elevations exceed 12,800 feet (3,900 m) above sea level, descending to 1,850 feet (560 m) at the confluence with the Missouri River in far western North Dakota. The watershed spans 34,167 square miles (88,490 km^{2}). The area contains many lakes, including Yellowstone Lake.

=== Dams ===
There are no storage dams located on the mainstem of the Yellowstone River. There are, however, six low-head diversion dams on the river that supply water to irrigation canals for use by farmer and ranchers.

Dam	Location
Huntley Diversion Dam	45°52′28″N 108°20′55″W
Waco Diversion Dam	46°02′34″N 107°48′03″W
Ranchers Ditch Diversion	46°10′39″N 107°26′12″W
Yellowstone Canal Diversion	46°16′52″N 107°18′06″W
Cartersville Diversion Dam	46°16′32″N 106°40′47″W
Intake Diversion Dam	47°16′49″N 104°31′48″W

Additionally, the watershed contains five major reservoirs built on tributary rivers: Boysen, Buffalo Bill, Big Horn, Tongue River, and Lake De Smet reservoirs.

== Geography ==
The river rises in northwestern Wyoming in the Absaroka Range, on the Continental Divide in southwestern Park County. The river starts where the North Fork and the South Fork of the Yellowstone River converge. The North Fork, the larger of the two forks, flows from Younts Peak. The South Fork flows from the southern slopes of Thorofare Mountain. The Yellowstone River flows northward through Yellowstone National Park, feeding and draining Yellowstone Lake, then dropping over the Upper and Lower Yellowstone Falls at the head of the Grand Canyon of the Yellowstone within the confines of the park. After passing through the Black Canyon of the Yellowstone downstream of the Grand Canyon, the river flows northward into Montana between the northern Absaroka Range and the Gallatin Range in Paradise Valley. The river emerges from the mountains near the town of Livingston, where it turns eastward and northeastward, flowing across the northern Great Plains past the city of Billings.

East of Billings, it is joined by the Bighorn River. Farther downriver, it is joined by the Tongue near Miles City, and then by the Powder in eastern Montana. It flows into the Missouri River near Buford, North Dakota, just upstream from Lake Sakakawea. The latter is a reservoir formed in 1953 by the Garrison Dam, built on the Missouri River within the Fort Berthold Indian Reservation. It flooded the fertile bottomlands of the Affiliated Tribes (Mandan, Arikara, Hidatsa), damaging their economy and reducing their ability to be self-sufficient.

In Montana, the river's waters have been used extensively for irrigation since the 1860s. In its upper reaches, within Yellowstone Park and the mountains of Montana, it is a popular destination for fly fishing. The Yellowstone is a Class I river from the Yellowstone National Park boundary to the North Dakota border for the purposes of stream access for recreational purposes.

== Water right claims ==
The division of water rights to the entire Yellowstone River Basin among Wyoming, Montana and North Dakota, governed by a 1950 compact, was disputed in a 2010 lawsuit brought directly to the U.S. Supreme Court by Montana against Wyoming. Oral argument took place in January 2011. On May 2, 2011, the Court held 7–2 (by Justice Thomas, with Justice Scalia dissenting) that Montana had no valid claim that its water supply had been diminished since Wyoming was irrigating the same acreage as always, albeit by a more modern method that returned less runoff to go downstream to Montana. (A subsequent 2011 Supreme Court case, in which Montana asserted ownership of Missouri Basin river bottoms, so as to collect decades of back rent from a hydropower company, is unrelated. On February 22, 2012, Montana lost that case too.)

== History ==
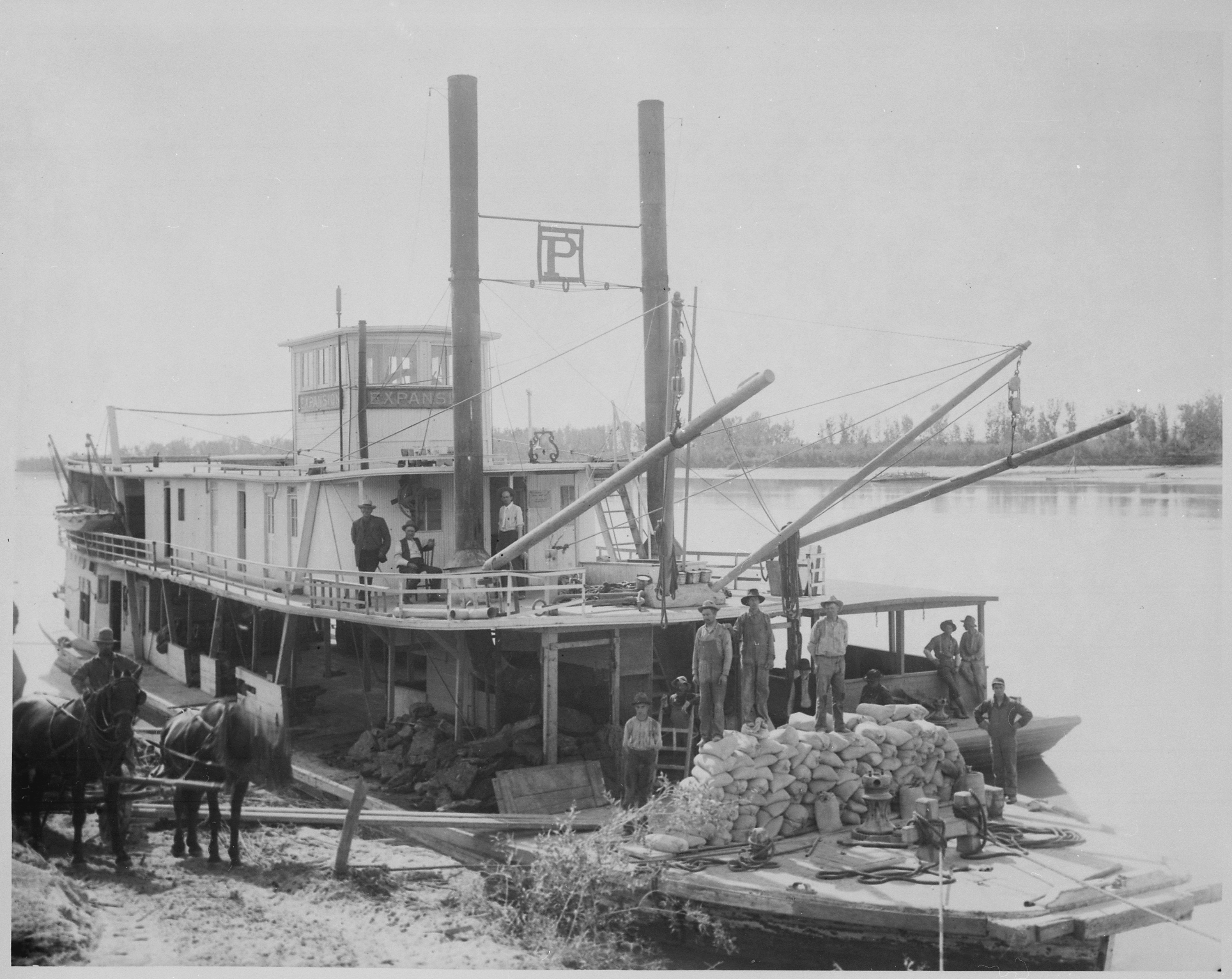
The river steamer Expansion on the Yellowstone River in Montana, 1907

The Yellowstone River had long been an important artery of transportation for Native Americans. The region around the Big Horn, Powder and Tongue rivers is the traditional summer hunting grounds for numerous Native American tribes: Lakota Sioux, Crow, Cheyenne and Cree. Gold was discovered near Virginia City, Montana in the 1860s, and two of the primary routes for accessing the goldfields were the Bozeman Trail and the Bridger Trail both of which followed the Yellowstone for a short length. In the 19th century, European-American settlers depended on the river for transportation, and generally entered the region by riverboat.

Native American anger at settler encroachment on their hunting grounds led to Red Cloud's War. The conflict was settled with the Treaty of Fort Laramie in 1868, by which the US granted the territory of the Black Hills and the Powder River Country to the Lakota people. This region included the drainages of the Big Horn, Powder and Tongue rivers. But the discovery of gold in 1874 in the Black Hills, however, attracted thousands of miners who invaded the sacred grounds and competed for resources. New armed conflicts broke out with the Lakota Sioux.

The new competition and violence led to the Great Sioux War of 1876–77. The US sent in troops to protect the miners, although they had violated the treaty, and to defeat the Sioux. In 1876, Colonel John Gibbon led a column of men from Fort Ellis near Bozeman, Montana and traveled down the Yellowstone to meet up with General Alfred Terry's Dakota Column, which had traveled upstream from North Dakota. Terry formed a base of operations at the mouth of Rosebud Creek on the Yellowstone, but the US miscalculated the strength of the Lakota, who had gathered by the thousands along the river. Lieutenant Colonel George Armstrong Custer departed from Rosebud Creek with the 7th Cavalry on the expedition that ended in his complete defeat by the Lakota and Cheyenne at the Battle of the Little Bighorn. The army ferried its survivors down the Yellowstone to the Missouri, and to Fort Abraham Lincoln.

The US Army returned in force and finally achieved victory over the tribes, forcing them onto reservations. The Lakota and allies were forced from eastern Montana and Wyoming: some bands fled to Canada, while others suffered removal to distant reservations, primarily located in present-day South Dakota and Nebraska west of the Missouri River. Crow warriors had enlisted as scouts with the US Army during the war and the Crow Indian Reservation was established in south-central Montana. The Northern Cheyenne Indian Reservation is south of the Yellowstone in Montana.

Many of the early expeditions to the area that was later protected as Yellowstone National Park traveled along the Yellowstone River. These included the Cook–Folsom–Peterson Expedition and the Washburn-Langford-Doane Expedition. In the early 1870s, the Northern Pacific Railroad attempted to extend rail service along the Yellowstone to Livingston from Bismarck, North Dakota, a route proposed to cross the last of the Lakota buffalo hunting grounds. This route was finally completed in 1883. By the early 20th century, Northern Pacific was providing train service along the river to the north entrance of the park near Gardiner.

=== Incidents ===
==== 2011 oil spill ====
An ExxonMobil pipeline runs from Silver Tip, to Billings, Montana. On Friday, July 1, 2011, it ruptured about 10 miles (16 km) west of Billings at about 10:40 p.m. The resulting spill leaked an estimated 1,500 barrels of oil, equivalent to 63,000 US gallons (240,000 L; 52,000 imp gal), into the Yellowstone River for 56 minutes before it was shut down. As a precaution against a possible explosion, officials in Laurel, Montana evacuated about 140 people on Saturday just after midnight, allowing them to return at 4 a.m. Montana Governor Brian Schweitzer stated that "The parties responsible will restore the Yellowstone River".

==== 2015 oil spill ====
According to the Bridger Pipeline LLC, an oil spill occurred near Glendive on January 17, 2015, at 10 a.m. In response, the pipeline company shut down the pipeline at 11 a.m. in effort to prevent further environmental hazards. The company stated that 300–1,200 oil barrels (equivalent to 12,600 to 50,400 US gallons) were spilled into the river. State officials estimated, on the other hand, up to 50,000 US gallons (190,000 L; 42,000 imp gal) of spilled oil. Benzene, a carcinogen, was found in ten to fifteen parts per billion. An EPA official said that "anything above five parts per billion is considered a long-term risk." Nearly 6,000 people were told not to use municipal water in Glendive due to the elevated levels of cancer-causing benzene found in the Yellowstone River, and in the tap water supplied. Bottled water was provided to their residents. On January 23, 2015, the city water treatment plant was declared decontaminated. City officials declared tap water safe to consume.

The Wyoming company from True Companies' Poplar pipeline system involved in this incident has a history of nine oil spills in 2006–14 leaking an amount of 11,000 US gallons (42,000 L; 9,200 imp gal) of crude. Also, their sister company Belle Fourche Pipeline owned by Tad True and their family, recorded twenty-one incidents in the same period leaking 272,832 US gallons (1,032,780 L; 227,180 imp gal) of oil, both companies had federal fines levied against them and appear in governments records. The oil cleanup on Yellowstone River was put on hold for one month or more on February 3, 2015 until the ice melts. Montana Department of Environmental Quality was monitoring an area spanning a 90-mile (140 km) stretch of the Yellowstone, from the spill site downstream to a bridge just across the North Dakota border.

==== 2016 river closure ====
On August 19, 2016 the Montana Department of Fish, Wildlife and Parks Department indefinitely closed the river and its tributaries from Gardiner, Montana to Laurel, Montana to all recreational activity. The 183-mile (295 km) closure resulted from a massive fish kill attributed to proliferative kidney disease, a rare but serious salmonid disease. The parasite--Tetracapsuloides bryosalmonae—is not harmful to humans or other mammals. Wildlife officials estimate tens of thousands of fish may have died, mostly mountain whitefish, but Yellowstone cutthroat and rainbow trout have been affected. The closure is expected to cause significant adverse economic impact to businesses which depend on summer tourist and recreational activities along the river.

On September 1, 2016, the agency reopened two stretches of the river. The first stretch, from the northern boundary of Yellowstone National Park to Carbella, Montana, was open to non-fishing recreation only to allow the fish population to recover. The second stretch, from Carbella, Montana to Laurel, Montana, was opened to all uses.

Peak Yellowstone River temperatures exceeded 68 °F (20 °C) for 18 straight days from July 17 to August 4. Montana Fish Wildlife and Parks notes that trout and whitefish prefer water temperatures close to 55 °F (13 °C).

==== 2021 river closure ====
On January 26, 2021, the Montana Department of Fish, Wildlife and Parks closed a 200-yard (180 m) section of the Yellowstone River approximately 6 miles (9.7 km) east of Reed Point at the request of the Montana Department of Transportation (MDT), after MDT inspectors discovered the bridge that carried Twin Bridges Road (former US-10) over the river was in danger of collapse. The 3-span truss bridge, built in 1931, had shown advanced deterioration of the structural members. Of particular concern, one of the bridge piers had lost about half of its support capacity due to bridge scour undermining the pier footings. MDT awarded a $2 million emergency demolition contract on March 11, 2021. By the end of April 2021, construction crews had safely dismantled the failing structure, and the river reopened on May 26, 2021.

==== 2022 river floods ====
On June 13, 2022, Yellowstone National Park officials announced all park entrances were closed to visitors, citing "record flooding events" and a forecast of more rain to come. The historic Carbella Bridge was destroyed.

==== 2023 bridge failure ====
In June 2023, a railroad bridge collapsed that had been built adjacent to the Twin Bridges Road Bridge (c. 1931–2021). This resulted in several rail cars falling into the Yellowstone River. Approximately 48,000 US gallons (180,000 L) of molten petroleum products were released into the river. Fish consumption advisories were put in place due to the detection of polycyclic aromatic hydrocarbons in mountain whitefish downstream of the collapse.

== Climate patterns ==
Flooding occurs in the watershed due to snowmelt, rainfall, and intense thunderstorms. In higher elevations, snowmelt can cause flood conditions due to rapid melt in spring and early summer. In lower elevations, regional rainstorms and intense thunderstorms can cause flooding in summer and fall.

Severe droughts have occurred in the Yellowstone Watershed that have lasted several years. Droughts have occurred in the basin in 1929–42, 1948–62 and 1976–82. The 1977 drought affected most of the western United States and resulted in decreased streamflows in the watershed. The reduced flow resulted in increased dissolved solids concentrations in the basin. Water quality varies across the various rivers in the basin. In mountainous areas, suspended sediment and dissolved solid concentrations are lower than in basin and plain areas. Human activities, including agriculture and mining, along with natural sources, contribute to suspended sedimentation levels in plain areas. In addition, fecal bacteria, salt, and selenium contamination is present in some streams within the watershed.

The exploitation of oil resources and infrastructure in the region has also produced contamination of the river, including by major oil spills.

== Fishing ==
The Yellowstone River is considered to be one of the greatest trout streams of the world and is officially classed as a blue ribbon stream in Montana from the park to the confluence with the Boulder River east of Livingston and from the mouth of Rosebud creek near Rosebud, Montana to the North Dakota border. The lack of dams along the river provides for excellent trout habitat from high inside Yellowstone Park, downstream through Gardiner, the Paradise Valley, Livingston, and to Big Timber, a stretch of nearly 200 miles (320 km). The Yellowstone varies in width from 74 feet (23 m) to 300 feet (91 m), so fishing is normally done by boat. The most productive stretch of water is through Paradise Valley in Montana, especially near Livingston which holds brown, rainbow and native Yellowstone cutthroat trout as well as mountain whitefish. From Billings downstream to the North Dakota border, anglers seek burbot, channel catfish, paddlefish, sauger, smallmouth bass, and walleye. The pallid sturgeon (Scaphirhynchus albus), an endangered species endemic to the waters of the Missouri and lower Mississippi River basins, is also found in the Yellowstone.

	Yellowstone Lake to Yellowstone Falls
Yellowstone River, Fishing Bridge, July 1959	The river inside Yellowstone National Park provides accessible flat water fishing and abundant Yellowstone cutthroat trout. The portion of the river through the Hayden Valley is closed all year long, but the rest is accessible and easily wadable. No floating is allowed. Numerous insect hatches occur following the opening of the river on July 1 providing anglers the opportunity to try numerous artificial flies including Pale Morning Duns, Green Drakes, Gray Drakes, Caddis and salmon-flies.
	Grand Canyon of the Yellowstone and Black Canyon of the Yellowstone
Black Canyon of the Yellowstone near Gardiner, Montana	The canyon reaches inside Yellowstone National Park are accessible only by hiking or horseback. The river here is usually quite swift, with sheer canyon walls in spots. Below Knowles Falls, about 4 miles (6.4 km) upstream from Gardiner, anglers will find browns and whitefish in addition to the rainbows and cutthroat trout.
	Gardiner to Yankee Jim Canyon
Just south of Yankee Jim Canyon	This section of the Yellowstone holds a good population of medium-sized rainbow and cutthroat trout, with a few big browns as well. The first half of this section from Gardiner to the bridge at Corwin Springs is mostly fast water, with some class II and III white water. From Corwin Springs to Yankee Jim Canyon, the river flattens out substantially and gives the angler more time to cast to fish along the banks.
	Yankee Jim Canyon
Upper Yankee Jim Canyon	Yankee Jim Canyon is the Yellowstone's best white water, with several major rapids. Steep canyon walls make it a difficult stretch to fish. Because of the potential danger in floating the Canyon, many commercial fishing guides do not float this stretch, though recreational floaters are common.
	Tom Miner Bridge to Emigrant
Yellowstone River near Emigrant	From the Tom Miner Bridge (or the Carbella access just downstream) down to Point of Rocks, there is some excellent water, much fast pocket water with several nice pools. Once the river reaches the Point of Rocks, the gradient decreases substantially and the river turns into slower, longer pools.
	Emigrant to Mallard's Rest
Drift Boat Fly Fishing on the Yellowstone near Grey Owl	Just downstream from Emigrant is Grey Owl, one of the best fishing access points on the river. From here down to Mallard's Rest there is a pleasant mix of big pools and large browns and rainbows.
	Mallard's Rest to Carter's Bridge
Armstrong Spring Creek near Mallard's Rest	This section of river known as Paradise Valley provides some of the most spectacular scenery on the Yellowstone, along with some of the best fishing. The scenery is dominated by the Absaroka Range to the east and the Gallatin Mountains to the west. Along this stretch numerous spring creeks flow into the river, many of which are blue ribbon trout streams in their own right, such as DePuy Spring Creek. Rainbows dominate this part of the river, but browns can be found here also.
	Carter's Bridge to Highway 89 Bridge
Winter Ice Near Carter's Bridge, January 2008	Because the Yellowstone flows right through Livingston between these points, this is known as the "town stretch". Given the presence of the upstream spring creeks for spawning, this reach of fast water is ideal habitat for rainbows which make up most of the population here. The use of a drift boat is the best way to access this stretch, though there are some good access points for walking and wading as well.
	Highway 89 Bridge to Big Timber
	This section starts about 5 miles (8.0 km) to the east of Livingston, just off Interstate 90, where Highway 89 turns north, toward White Sulphur Springs. This lower river, from here on down through Big Timber is similar to the water around Livingston, but the riffles and pools are farther apart so there is more unproductive water. The fish populations are not as high as in the upper river and water through town, but there are some very large rainbows and browns to be caught in this stretch. In late summer, wind gusting across hayfields blows a lot of grasshoppers in the river which creates explosive reactions from big fish.

== See also ==
- Angling in Yellowstone National Park
- List of fishes of Yellowstone National Park
- Montana Stream Access Law
- List of longest rivers of the United States
- List of rivers of Montana
- List of rivers of North Dakota
- List of rivers of Wyoming
- List of waterfalls in Yellowstone National Park
