= The Murray Hotel =

Hotel in Livingston, Montana, US

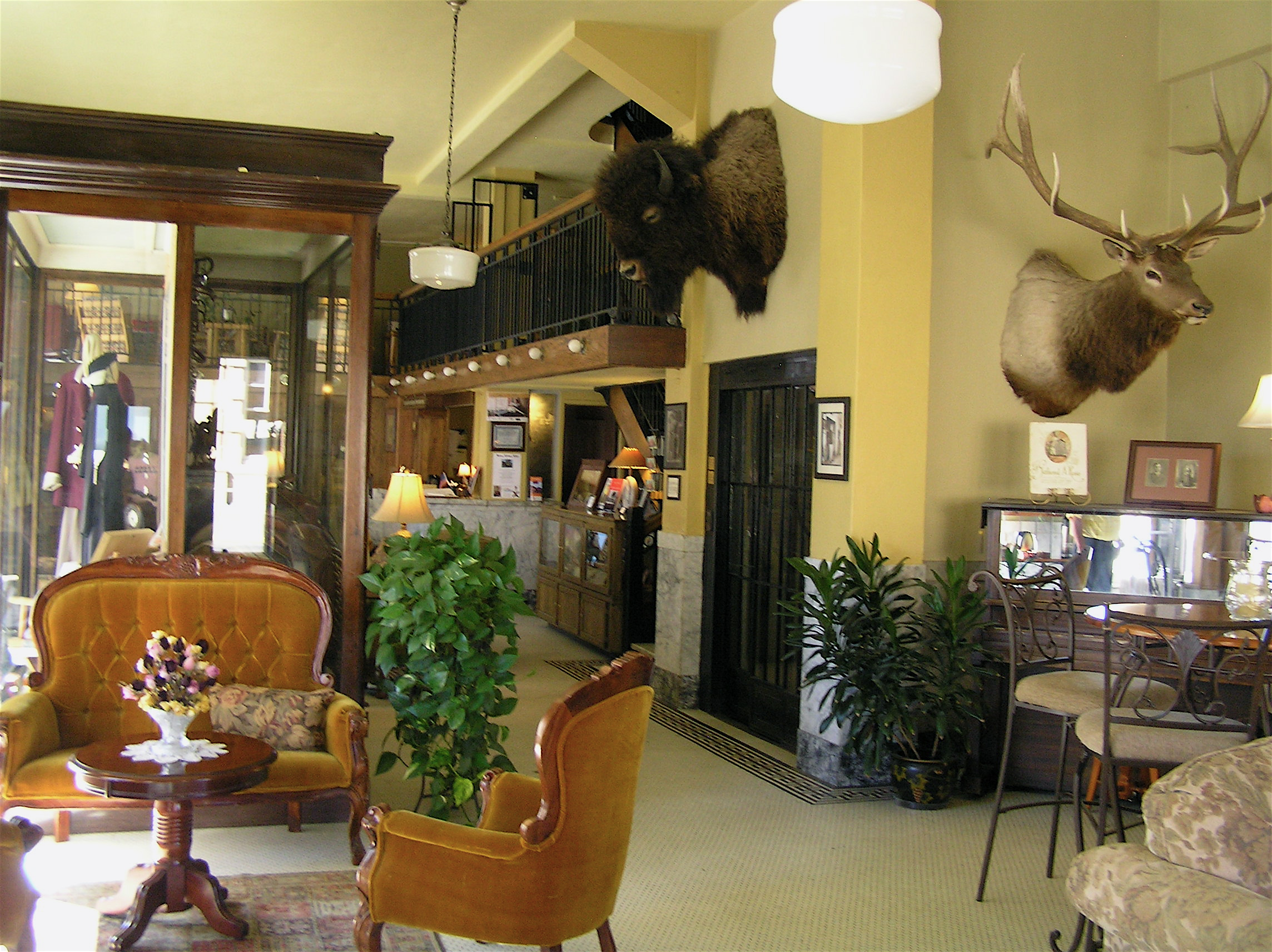
- Lobby of the Murray Hotel
- Interactive map of the The Murray Hotel area

General information
- Location: Livingston, Montana, United States, 201 West Park Street, Livingston, Montana 59047
- Coordinates: 45°39′41″N 110°33′44″W
- Opening: 1904
- Owner: Dan and Kathleen Kaul

Technical details
- Floor count: 4

Other information
- Number of rooms: 29
- Number of restaurants: 1
- Parking
- The Murray Hotel
- U.S. Historic district – Contributing property
- Added to NRHP: September 5, 1979

Website
- http://murrayhotel.com/

The Murray Hotel, originally named the Elite Hotel, is a historic hotel in Livingston, Montana, United States. The original two story hotel was built at the corner of Park and Second St. in 1904 by Josephine Kline to accommodate passengers from the Northern Pacific Railway. The Elite was one of thirteen hotels built in downtown Livingston between 1884 and 1914 to service railroad travelers. Its construction was financed by the family of a future U.S. Senator from Montana, James E. Murray. The hotel's location opposite the Northern Pacific Railway's Livingston Depot made it a prime destination for railroad travelers. The hotel is located within the Livingston Commercial District, a registered National Historic District.

== Expansion, foreclosure and renaming ==
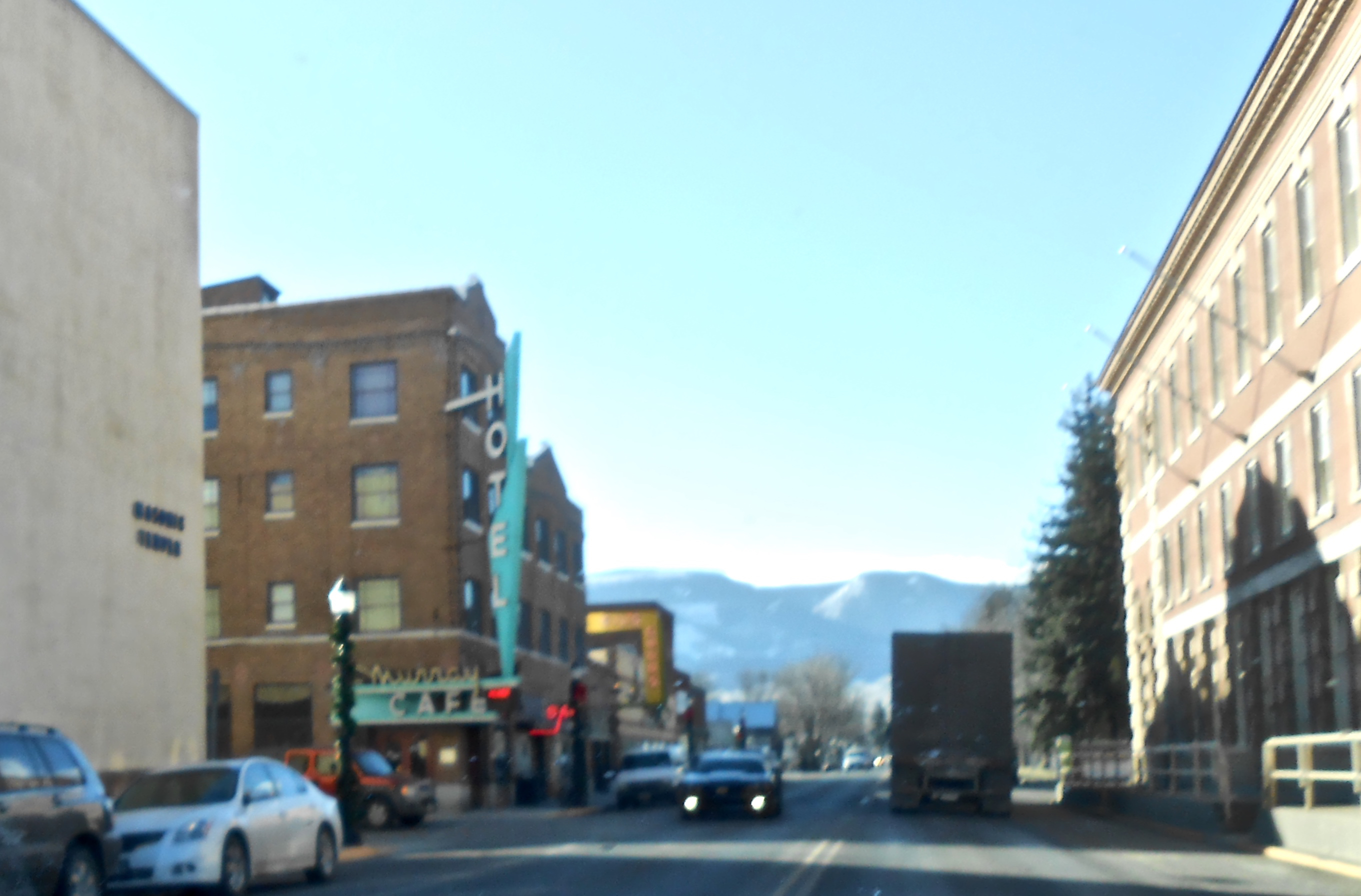
Street view of the Murray (to left)

In the 1920s, the hotel expanded to four floors and 66 rooms. In the mid-1920s, the Murray family foreclosed on Josephine Kline, took over the operation of the hotel and renamed it The Murray. Although Kline contested the foreclosure all the way to Washington D.C. as late as 1934, she failed to recover ownership from the Murrays. One of the unique aspects of the Murray was the installation of a 1905 hand-cranked Otis Elevator, at the time the only elevator in Livingston.

== Watering hole ==
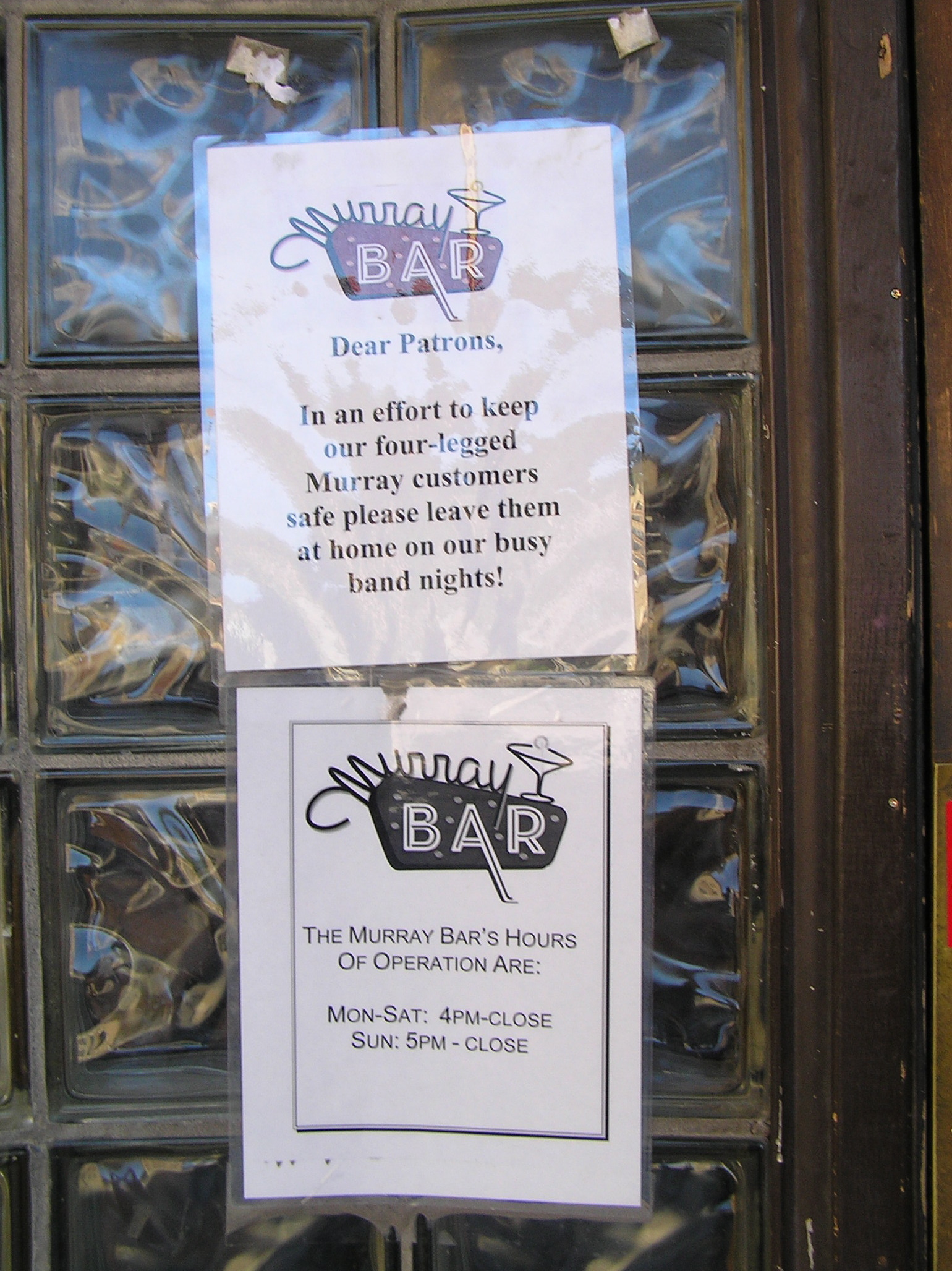
Dogs are usually welcome at the Murray Bar

The Murray has always hosted a café or restaurant and a bar. The Murray Bar is well known for its celebrity visitors during filming of movies in the Paradise Valley. The 2nd Street Bistro, opened in 2004 and preceded in years prior by the Peterson and the Winchester Cafe, is the current hotel restaurant. The Bistro was featured in Anthony Bourdain: No Reservations 2009 episode on Montana where he dined with author Jim Harrison and artist Russell Chatham.

== Ownership ==
The Murray experienced a serious reduction in business during the 1960s, mostly due to the decline in rail travel and growth of the Interstate Highway System. In 1978, local Montana ranchers Cliff and Pat Miller purchased the hotel from the Murray family and made modest renovations. The hotel was purchased by Dan and Kathleen Kaul, formerly from Minneapolis, Minnesota in 1991. They undertook major renovations and reduced the number of hotel suites to 29. In 2001 the Kauls changed the business model of the hotel allowing individual investors to own individual suites, much like a condominium. Today, most of the hotel is available to the public, with 30 rooms and suites available.

== Notable visitors and events ==
The following notable individuals have lived or stayed at the Murray Hotel:

- Whoopi Goldberg, comedian, actress
- Walter Jerome Hill, youngest son of James Jerome Hill, builder of the Great Northern Railway
- Margot Kidder, actress, activist
- Margrethe II, Queen of Denmark
- Jack Palance, actor
- Sam Peckinpah, director, lived in a three-room suite at the Murray from 1979 to 1984
- Robert Redford, actor, director
- Will Rogers, humorist
- Rip Torn, actor
- Robert Wadlow, the tallest man in the world, stayed in October 1939

== Notes ==
Melcher, Joan (2009). Montana Watering Holes: The Big Sky's Best Bars. Guildford, CT: Globe Pequot Press. pp. 4–5. ISBN 978-0-7627-4948-5.
