= KPRK =

Simulcast of KMMS Bozeman
- Livingston, Montana; United States
- Broadcast area: Bozeman, Montana
- Frequency: 1340 kHz
- Branding: AM 1450 KMMS

Programming
- Format: News/talk
- Affiliations: Fox News Radio; Genesis Communications Network; Premiere Networks; Westwood One

Ownership
- Owner: Townsquare Media; (Townsquare License, LLC)
- Sister stations: KISN; KMMS; KMMS-FM; KXLB; KZMY

History
- First air date: 1946
- Call sign meaning: Park County

Technical information
- Licensing authority: FCC
- Facility ID: 37816
- Class: C
- Power: 1,000 watts unlimited
- Transmitter coordinates: 45°40′20.8″N 110°32′23.7″W

Links
- Public license information: Public file; LMS
- Webcast: Listen live
- Website: kmmsam.com

KPRK (1340 AM) is a radio station licensed to serve Livingston, Montana. The station is owned by Townsquare Media and the broadcast license is held by Townsquare License, LLC. KPRK airs a news/talk format, simulcasting sister station KMMS.

== History ==
Previous formats included country, Saturday night rock and roll, and Sunday morning big band. During the weekdays a segment of the afternoon shift was dedicated to local callers to hawk their goods with free advertising through the "Swap Shop" segment. Broadcasts started around 5:30 a.m. local time with the broadcast day ending at midnight. KPRK also broadcast local high school sports, rodeos and fairs. Several locals were also familiar faces or voices on the station for many years. KPRK also broadcast local news three times a day with the local court report during that time. KPRK staff received several awards for their news contributions to the Montana Associated Press for news reports gathered during 1999. The former country music slogan was "Cool Country 1340 KPRK". The station also featured an uninterrupted "Cool Country Triple Play" where two newer songs were played followed by a "Hit from Yesterday", otherwise known as a country classic.

As of 2019, KPRK is simulcasting its news/talk sister station KMMS.

The station was assigned the KPRK call letters by the Federal Communications Commission.

== Ownership ==
In February 2008, Colorado-based GAPWEST Broadcasting completed the acquisition of 57 radio stations in 13 markets in the Pacific Northwest-Rocky Mountain region from Clear Channel Communications. The deal, valued at a reported $74 million, included six Bozeman stations, seven in Missoula and five in Billings. Other stations in the deal are located in Shelby, Montana; and in Casper and Cheyenne, Wyoming; plus Pocatello and Twin Falls, Idaho; and Yakima, Washington. GapWest was folded into Townsquare Media on August 13, 2010.

Previous owners include Jann Berntsen, Marathon Media, and Clear Channel.

== Historic building ==
- KPRK Radio
- U.S. National Register of Historic Places
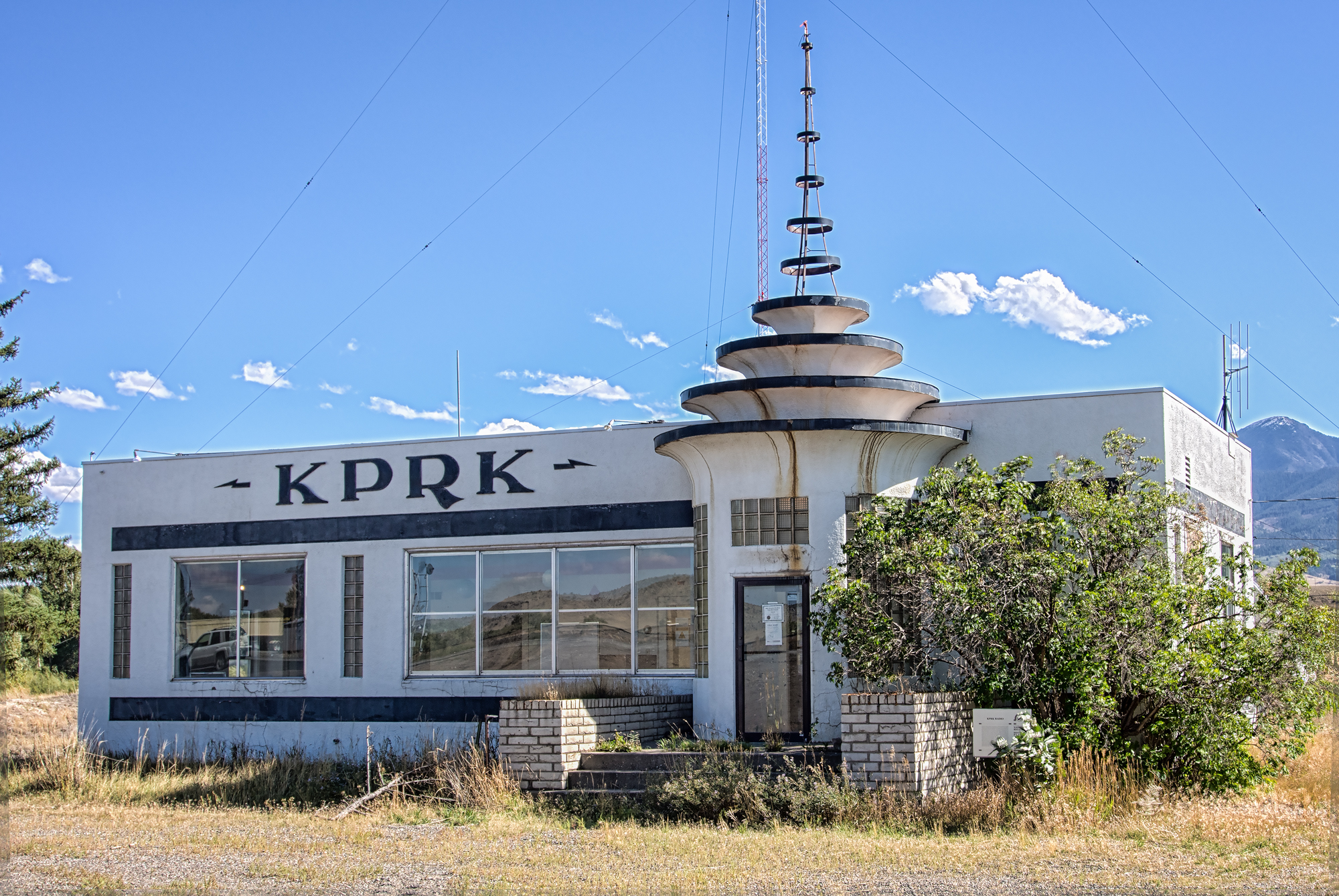

- Location within Montana Location within the United States
- Nearest city: Livingston, Montana
- Coordinates: 45°40′22″N 110°32′24″W
- Area: less than one acre
- Built: 1947
- Architect: Fox, William
- Architectural style: Moderne
- MPS: Livingston MRA
- NRHP reference No.: 79001414
- Added to NRHP: September 05, 1979

The KPRK radio building in Livingston is on the National Register of Historic Places. To the right of the front door, a plaque says that Missoula architect William Fox designed the building, complete with the "stylized radio tower" above the front door, in 1946.

According to reports in the Livingston Enterprise, Gap West stopped broadcasting from the historic building. All broadcasts are now fed from a studio in Bozeman.
