= KXLB =

- Churchill, Montana; United States
- Broadcast area: Bozeman, Montana
- Frequency: 100.7 MHz
- Branding: XL Country 100.7

Programming
- Format: Country
- Affiliations: Compass Media Networks; Premiere Networks

Ownership
- Owner: Townsquare Media; (Townsquare License, LLC)
- Sister stations: KISN, KMMS, KMMS-FM, KPRK, KZMY

History
- First air date: 2000
- Former call signs: KYLO (1999–2000)

Technical information
- Licensing authority: FCC
- Facility ID: 30566
- Class: C1
- ERP: 100,000 watts
- HAAT: 248 meters (814 feet)
- Transmitter coordinates: 45°40′24″N 110°52′02″W

Links
- Public license information: Public file; LMS
- Webcast: Listen Live
- Website: xlcountry.com

KXLB (100.7 FM, "XL Country 100.7") is a radio station licensed to serve Churchill, Montana. The station is owned by Townsquare Media and the broadcast license is held by Townsquare License, LLC.

All Townsquare Media Bozeman studios are located at 125 West Mendenhall Street, downtown Bozeman. KXLB, KMMS-FM, KZMY, and KISN all share a transmitter site on Green Mountain, east of Bozeman.

== Programming ==
KXLB airs a country music format to the greater Bozeman, Montana, area.

== History ==
This station received its original construction permit from the Federal Communications Commission on May 8, 1998. In January 1999, permit holder Jann Holter Bernsten applied to transfer the construction permit to Marathon Media of Montana, LP. The transfer was approved by the FCC on May 27, 1999, and the transaction was consummated on August 2, 1999.

The new station was assigned call sign KYLO by the FCC on December 28, 1999. This call sign was changed to KXLB on January 26, 2000. KXLB received its license to cover from the FCC on January 4, 2001.

In late-December 2000, Marathon Media Group, LLC, announced an agreement to sell KXLB to Clear Channel Communications subsidiary Clear Channel Broadcasting Licenses, Inc., as part of a multi-station transaction. The deal was approved by the FCC on February 21, 2001, and the transaction was consummated on the same day.

In October 2007, Clear Channel Communications applied to the FCC to sell this station along with 56 sister stations in 13 markets across the Pacific Northwest-Rocky Mountain region to Colorado-based GapWest Broadcasting. The deal, valued at a reported $74 million, included six Bozeman stations, seven in Missoula and five in Billings. Other stations in the deal are located in Shelby, Montana, and in Casper and Cheyenne, Wyoming, plus Pocatello and Twin Falls, Idaho, and Yakima, Washington. The deal was approved by the FCC on December 5, 2007, and the transaction was consummated on February 13, 2008. GapWest was folded into Townsquare Media on August 13, 2010.

== Translators ==
KXLB programming is also carried on a broadcast translator station to extend or improve the coverage area of the station.

Call sign	Frequency	City of license	FID	ERP (W)	Class	FCC info
K254AL	(98.7 FM) FM	Livingston, Montana	11009	250	D	LMS
