= Paradise Valley (Montana) =

River valley in Montana, United States

- Aerial view of Paradise Valley in autumn

- Location within Montana Location within the United States

Geography
- Country: United States
- State: Montana
- Region: Greater Yellowstone
- Coordinates: 45°23′47″N 110°44′9″W
- River: Yellowstone River
- Interactive map of Paradise Valley

Paradise Valley is a major river valley of the Yellowstone River in Southwestern Montana just north of Yellowstone National Park in Park County. The valley is flanked by the Absaroka Range on the east and the Gallatin Range on the west.

The Paradise Valley is separated from the Gallatin Valley and Bozeman, Montana, by the Bozeman Pass. Interstate 90 passes through both communities. The valley lies predominantly along a north–south axis, and is anchored to the north by Livingston, Montana, and to the south by Yankee Jim Canyon, approximately fifteen miles north of Gardiner, Montana, and the north entrance of Yellowstone Park. US Route 89 passes through the valley and into Yellowstone National Park. The valley was the route taken by early Yellowstone expeditions and the only recognized route into the park when it was established in 1872.

The Yellowstone River flows through the valley and is noted for world-class fly fishing in the river and nearby spring creeks such as DePuy Spring Creek. The valley also features several natural hot springs, including Chico Hot Springs near Emigrant, Montana, La Duke Hot Springs near Gardiner, and Hunter's Hot Springs near Livingston.

Mount Cowen is the largest peak near the valley, at 11,212 feet (3,417 m) in elevation. It is located in the southern portion of the valley on the eastern side of the river within the Absaroka mountain range.

The valley is winter range for elk, specifically The Paradise Valley Herd and The Northern Herd.

== In popular culture ==
In the Paramount Network show Yellowstone, Paradise Valley is the home to the (fictional) Yellowstone Ranch owned by John Dutton. It was also the namesake for resident John Mayer's 2013 album.

Images of Paradise Valley, Montana
Mule deer are common in the valley.

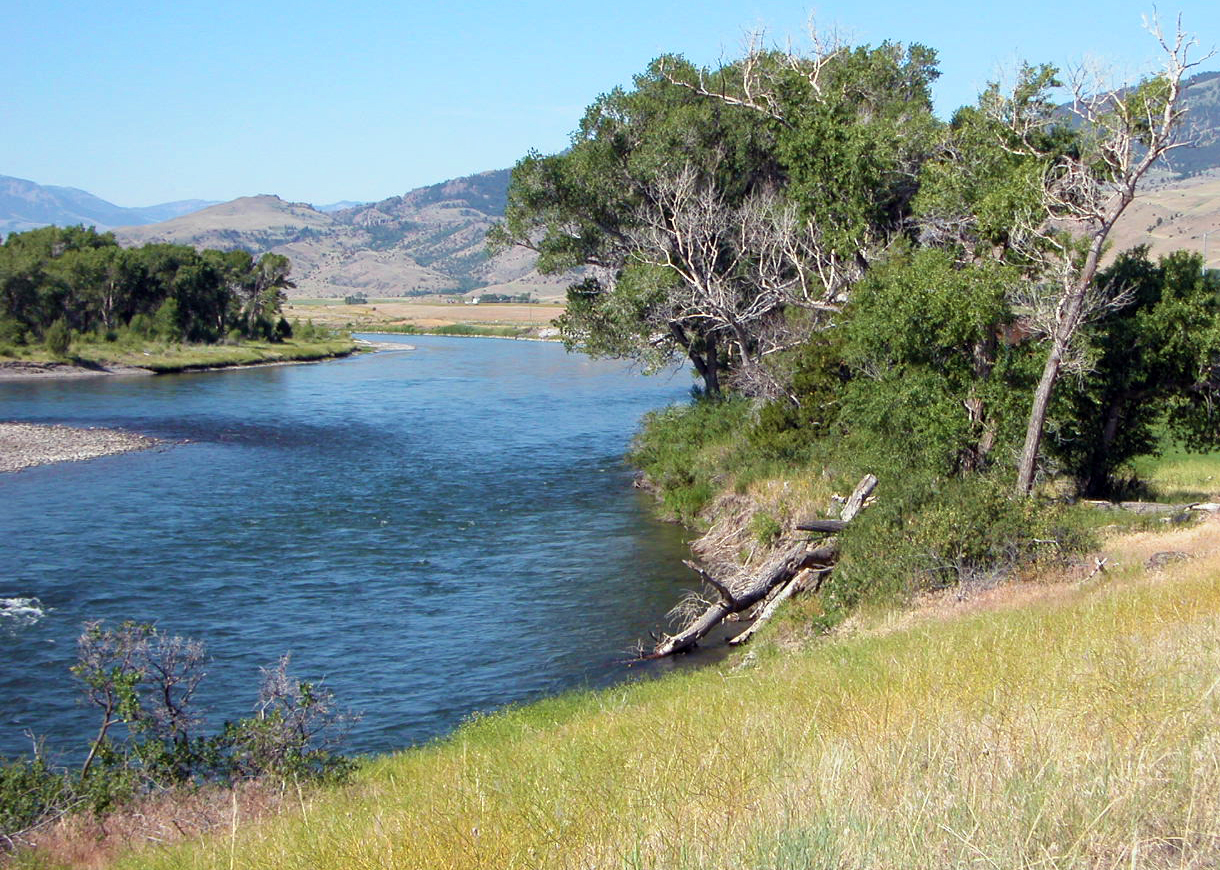
Yellowstone River in Emigrant, Montana

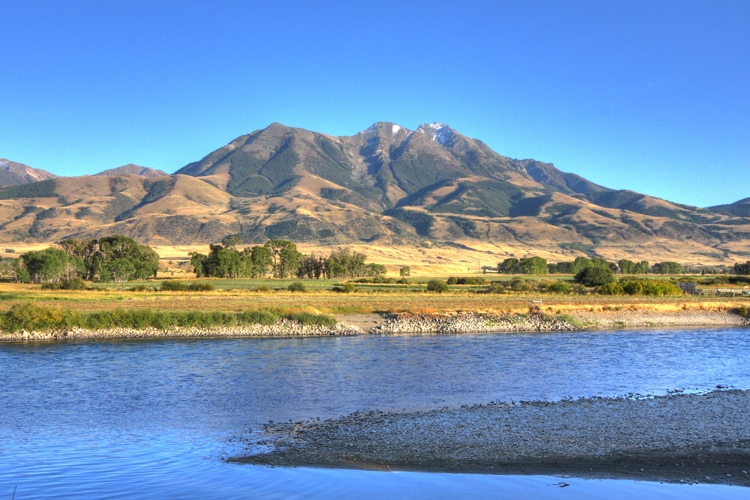
Emigrant Peak viewed from Rivers Bend Ranch near the town of Emigrant

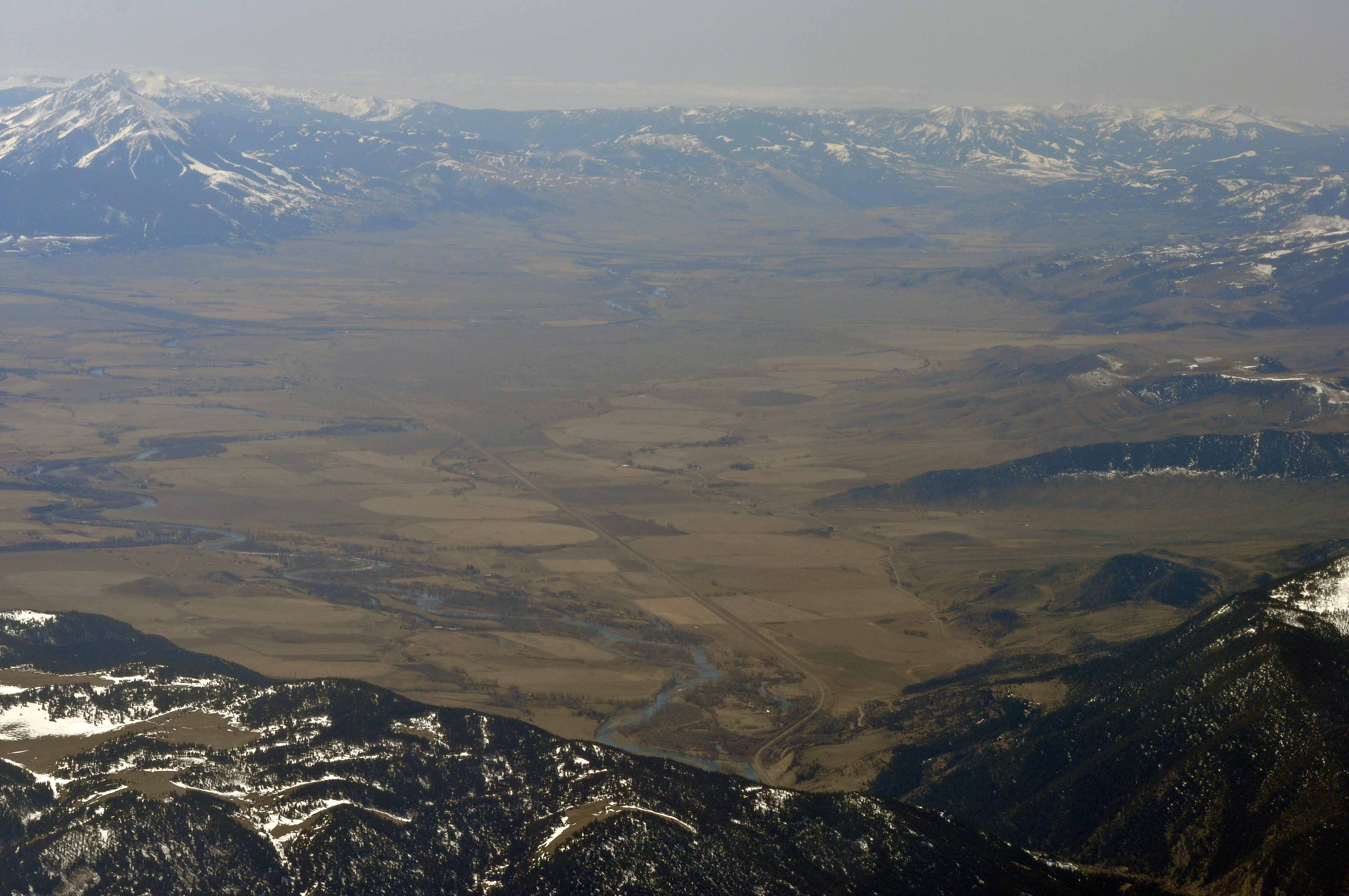
Paradise Valley from 15,000 feet (4,600 m) over Livingston, Montana (looking south)

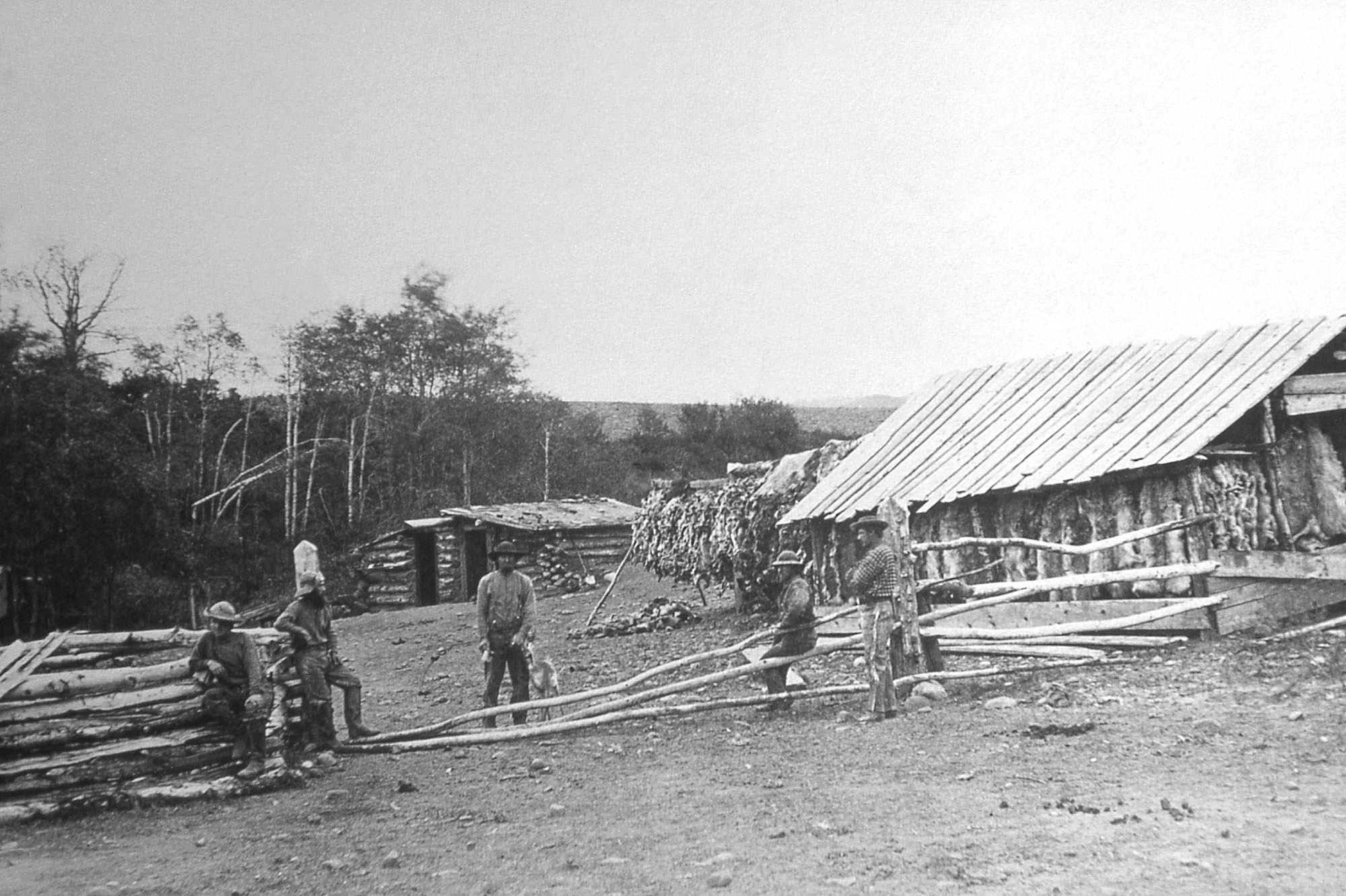
Bottler Ranch near Emigrant in 1871 during Hayden Geological Survey of 1871

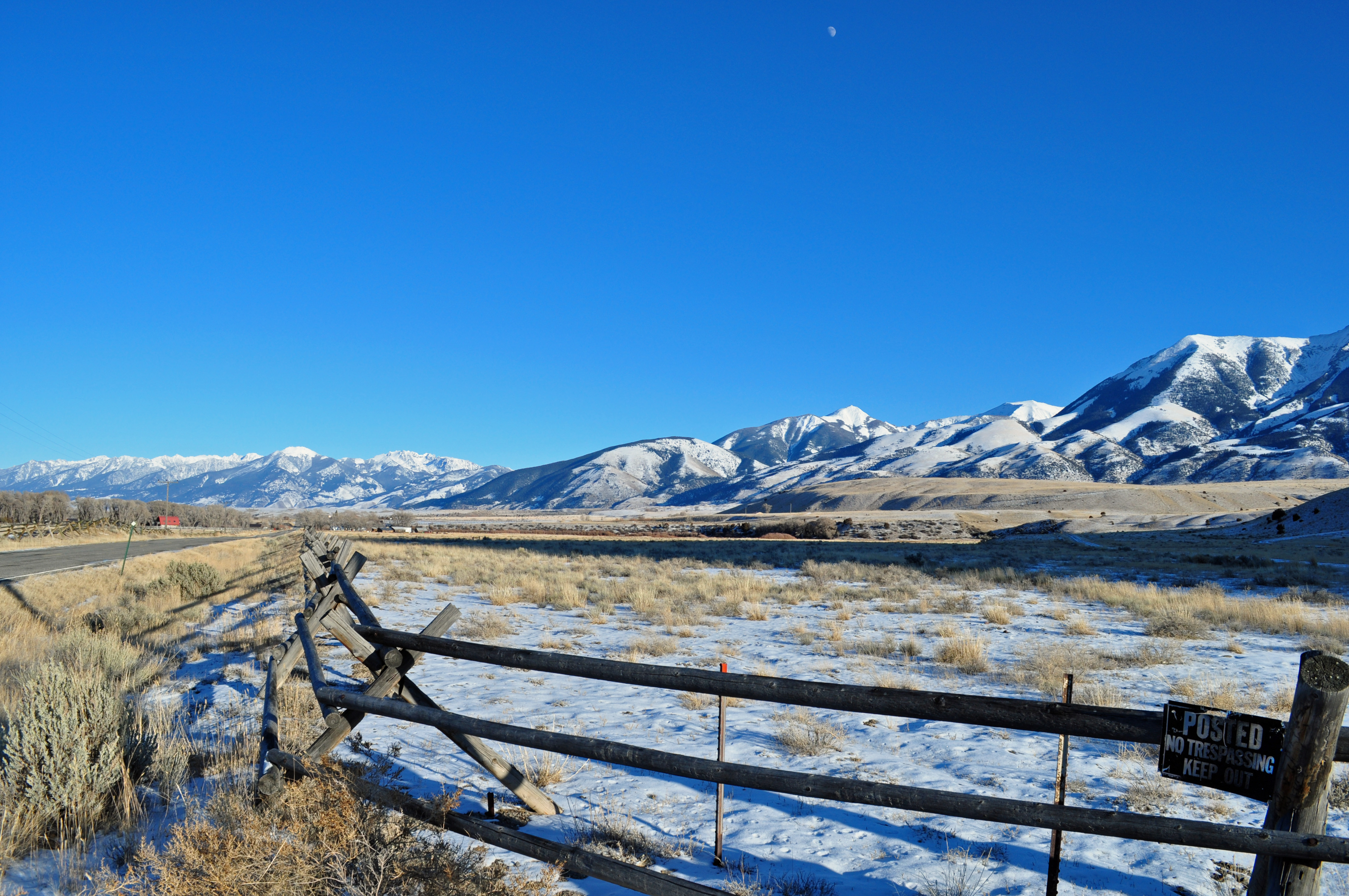
View of the Absaroka Range from the valley

== Notable residents ==
- Al Agnew, artist
- Casey Anderson, filmmaker and wildlife naturalist
- John Banovich, artist/conservationist
- Richard Brautigan, poet
- Jeff Bridges, actor
- Austen S. Cargill II, billionaire heir of Cargill
- Russell Chatham, American landscape artist, author, and fly fisherman
- Al Feldstein, Mad magazine founder
- Peter Fonda, actor/director
- Eduardo Garcia, chef, outdoorsman, public speaker
- Jim Harrison, author
- Margot Kidder, actress
- Patrick Markey, producer
- John Mayer, singer-songwriter
- Thomas McGuane, author
- Ken Niles, radio announcer, actor
- Wendell Niles, radio announcer, actor
- Christopher Paolini, author
- Missi Pyle, actress
