= DePuy Spring Creek =

Coordinates: 45°33′43″N 110°35′25″W

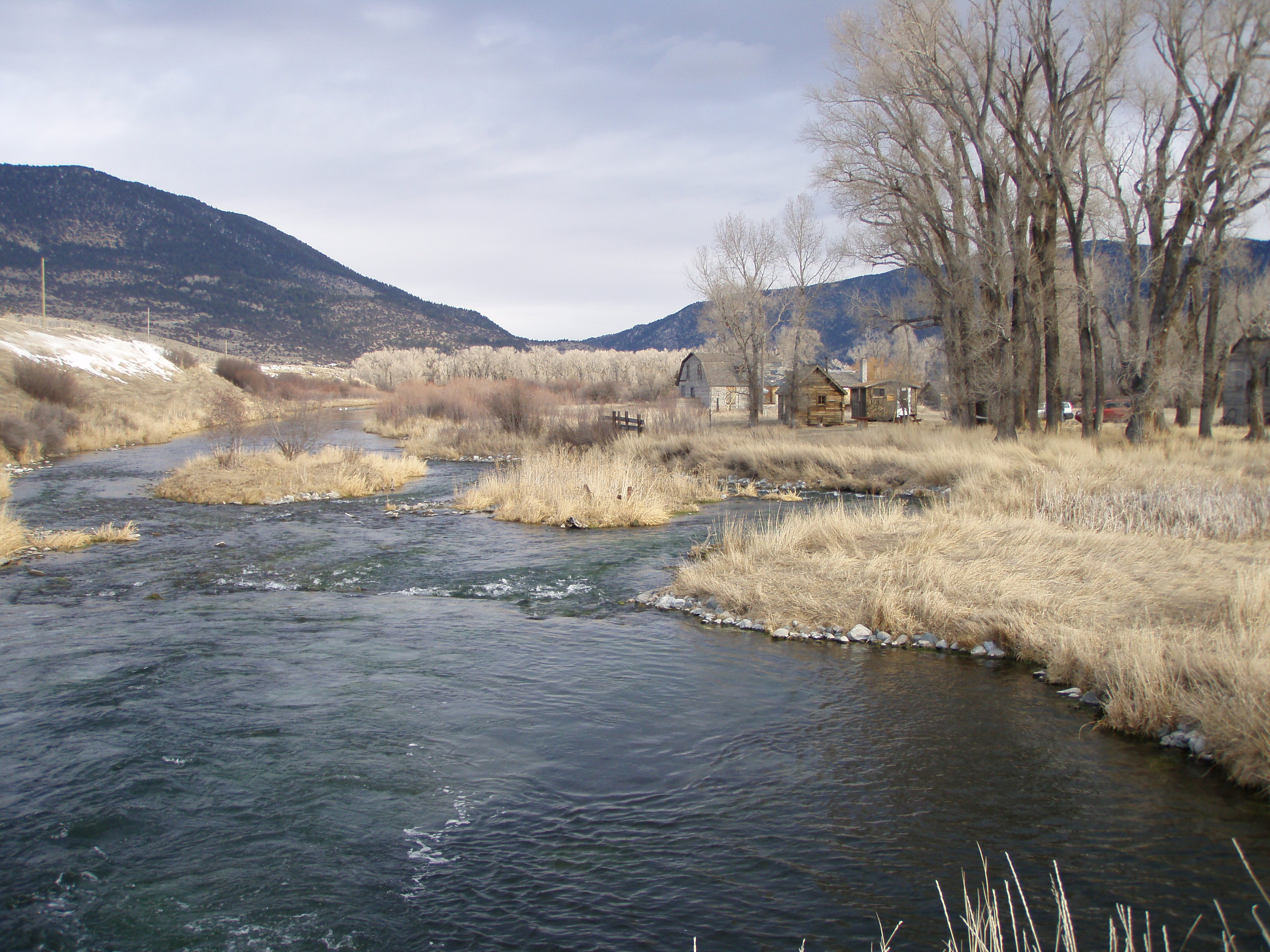
Upper Section of DePuy Spring Creek, January 2008

DePuy Spring Creek is a three mile long trout fishery located between the Absaroka and Gallatin mountain ranges in Paradise Valley, south of Livingston, Montana. The creek is a small tributary of the Yellowstone River. This fishery supports a population of brown, Yellowstone cutthroat and rainbow trout.
