= Al Agnew =

American naturalist painter

- Born: Al Agnew; 1952 (age 73–74)
- Known for: Painting
- Movement: Realism
- Spouse: Mary Agnew

Al Agnew (born 1952) is an American naturalist painter best known for his realistic wildlife and landscapes.

== Biography ==
Agnew was born in 1952, and grew up in the Missouri Ozarks where he was an avid fisherman studying and becoming knowledge of smallmouth bass. He received his degree in secondary education from Southeast Missouri State University at Cape Girardeau, Missouri where he began his art career working in watercolor, later transitioning to oils, and acrylics.

Recognition of Agnew's paintings of North American predators, particularly wolves lead to his art published on numerous Bass Pro Shop catalogues covers, and on several wildlife magazine covers, including Outdoor Life, Field & Stream, Sporting Classics, and Fish and Game among others.

Noted for his attention to detail and accuracy, Agnew has studied various game fish species in detail, paying particular attention to their dramatic change in appearance under differing light conditions.

A fisherman and conservationist, Agnew has served on advisory boards and concerning river conservation and is active in the Smallmouth Alliance, a national organization that devoted to preserving smallmouth bass fisheries. He has donated artwork to several wild animal conservation organizations for their fundraising efforts, including the Wolf Education Task Force and the International Grizzly Bear Committee. Overall, through specially commissioned artwork and his efforts as a conservationist he has raised funds that benefit wildlife organizations such as Ducks Unlimited, The National Wild Turkey Federation, The Rocky Mountain Elk Foundation, the Black Bass Foundation, and the Wolf Recovery Project.

== Personal life ==
He and his wife Mary split their time between rural Ste. Genevieve County, Missouri. and a log home in Paradise Valley, Montana.
