= KMMS (AM) =

Radio station in Bozeman, Montana, US

- Bozeman, Montana; United States
- Broadcast area: Bozeman, Montana
- Frequency: 1450 kHz
- Branding: AM 1450 KMMS

Programming
- Format: News/talk
- Affiliations: Fox News Radio; Genesis Communications Network; Premiere Networks; Westwood One

Ownership
- Owner: Townsquare Media; (Townsquare License, LLC)
- Sister stations: KISN; KMMS-FM; KPRK; KXLB; KZMY

History
- First air date: 1939
- Former call signs: KRBM (1939–1946); KXLQ (1946–1959); KXXL (1959–1988); KUUB (1988–1991)

Technical information
- Licensing authority: FCC
- Facility ID: 24170
- Class: C
- Power: 1,000 watts
- Transmitter coordinates: 45°41′53.8″N 111°1′43.8″W
- Translator: 95.1 K236CY (Bozeman)
- Repeater: 1340 KPRK (Livingston)

Links
- Public license information: Public file; LMS
- Webcast: Listen live
- Website: kmmsam.com

KMMS (1450 kHz) is an AM radio station licensed to serve Bozeman, Montana. The station is owned by Townsquare Media, licensed to Townsquare License, LLC. It airs a news/talk format.

All Townsquare Media Bozeman studios are located at 125 West Mendenhall Street, downtown Bozeman. The KMMS transmitter site is on East Griffin, north of Bozeman.

The station was assigned the KMMS call letters by the Federal Communications Commission on July 14, 1991.

== Ownership ==
In February 2008, Colorado-based GAPWEST Broadcasting completed the acquisition of 57 radio stations in 13 markets in the Pacific Northwest-Rocky Mountain region from Clear Channel Communications. The deal, valued at a reported $74 million, included six Bozeman stations, seven in Missoula and five in Billings. Other stations in the deal were located in Shelby, Montana, and in Casper and Cheyenne, Wyoming, plus Pocatello and Twin Falls, Idaho, and Yakima, Washington. GapWest was folded into Townsquare Media on August 13, 2010.
