= KISN (FM) =

- Belgrade, Montana; United States
- Broadcast area: Bozeman, Montana
- Frequency: 96.7 MHz
- Branding: 96.7 KISS FM

Programming
- Format: Top 40 (CHR)
- Affiliations: Compass Media Networks; Premiere Networks

Ownership
- Owner: Townsquare Media; (Townsquare License, LLC)
- Sister stations: KMMS, KMMS-FM, KPRK, KXLB, KZMY

History
- First air date: 1982 (as KCDQ)
- Former call signs: KCDQ (1982–1987); KGVW-FM (1987–1994); KSCY (1994–2004)
- Call sign meaning: "Kissin"

Technical information
- Licensing authority: FCC
- Facility ID: 24172
- Class: C2
- ERP: 18,500 watts
- HAAT: 248 meters (814 ft)
- Transmitter coordinates: 45°40′24″N 110°52′02″W

Links
- Public license information: Public file; LMS
- Webcast: Listen Live
- Website: bozemanskissfm.com

KISN (96.7 MHz, "96.7 KISS FM") is an FM radio station licensed to serve Belgrade, Montana. The station is owned by Townsquare Media, licensed to Townsquare License, LLC. It airs a top 40 (CHR) music format.

All Townsquare Media Bozeman studios are located at 125 West Mendenhall Street, downtown Bozeman. KXLB, KMMS-FM, KZMY, and KISN all share a transmitter site on Green Mountain, east of Bozeman.

The station was assigned the KISN call letters by the Federal Communications Commission on January 14, 2004.

== Ownership ==
In February 2008, Colorado-based GAPWEST Broadcasting completed the acquisition of 57 radio stations in 13 markets in the Pacific Northwest-Rocky Mountain region from Clear Channel Communications. The deal, valued at a reported $74 million, included six Bozeman stations, seven in Missoula and five in Billings. Other stations in the deal are located in Shelby, Montana, and in Casper and Cheyenne, Wyoming, plus Pocatello and Twin Falls, Idaho, and Yakima, Washington. GapWest was folded into Townsquare Media on August 13, 2010.

== History ==
96.7 started out as the easy listening station for Southwest Montana. In between 1983 and 1984, it became a Top 40 format. However it could not keep up with KUUB. By 1985, it became an Adult Contemporary format station. By 1990, it took the moniker 96 the sky, Montana's soft rock. Throughout the next ten years, The Sky would move towards a CHR format. It first moved towards hot AC in 1998. Through the next years, the sky moved towards adult top 40 with a CHR format consisting of Destiny's Child, Britney Spears and Creed, N'Sync, and The Backstreet Boys. By 2002 it became a full-blown top 40 under the All-hit 96 The sky moniker. In 2004 The callsign changed to KISN, the callsign used to be that of an Adult top 40 radio station in Salt Lake City. That frequency is now KZHT also a top 40 station owned by the same company until IHeartMedia (Clear Channel Radio) spun off its radio stations in small-town markets with Bozeman being one of them. For much of the 2000s, Kiss FM was known for mixing in hard rock since Bozeman did not have an active rock outlet. They also have thrown in local artists especially those in the hip hop genre.

Former KISN logo
