= Spring creek =

Underground spring(s) that feeds a unique river

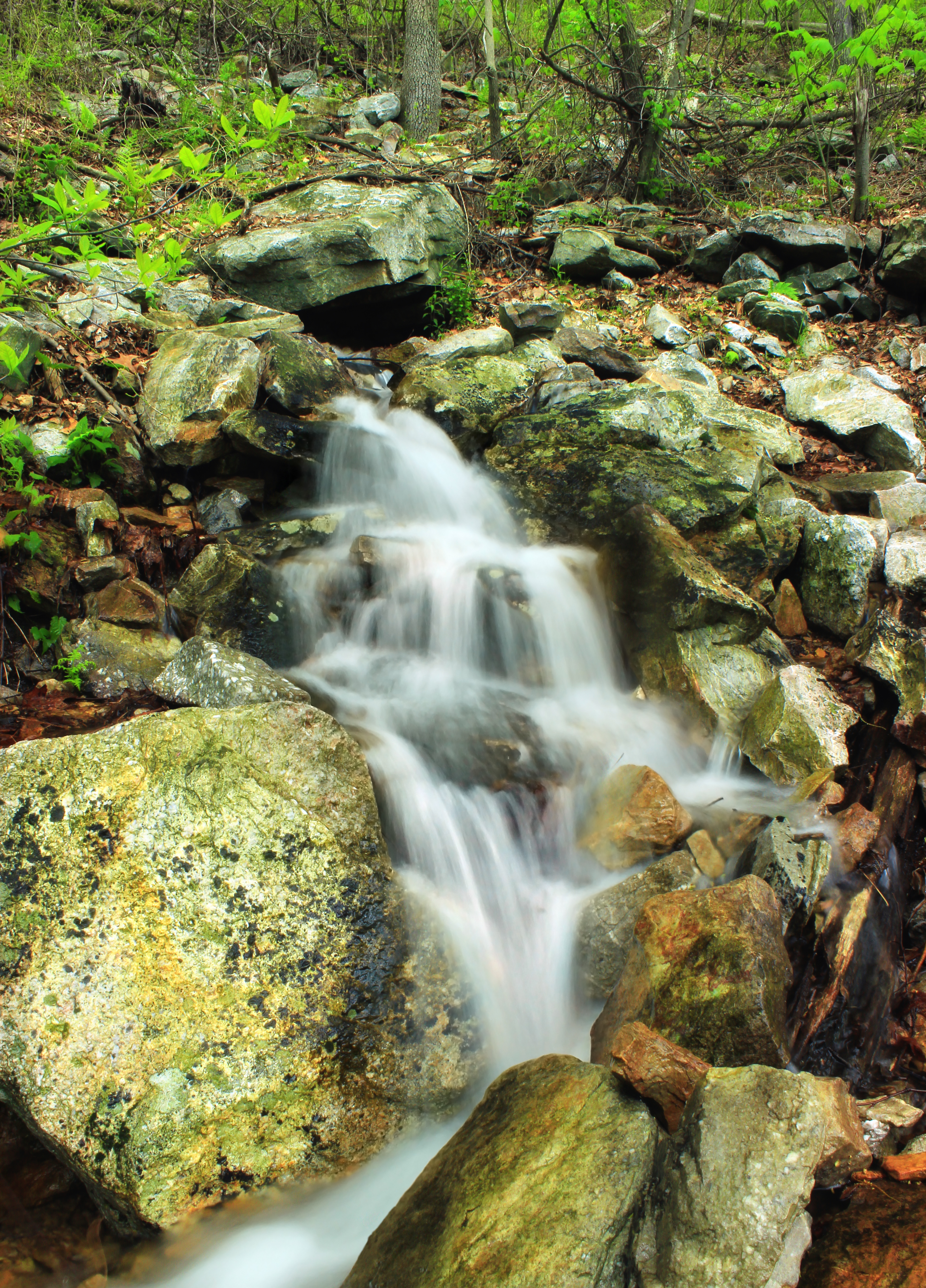
Delps Spring in Northampton County, Pennsylvania, U.S.

A spring creek is a type of free-flowing river whose name derives from its origin: an underground spring or set of springs which produces sufficient water to consistently feed a unique river. The water flowing in a spring creek may additionally be fed by snow pack or rain run-off, as in most traditional free-flowing rivers, but often the entire water source for a spring creek is an aquifer or other underground water source. For this reason, spring creeks are often filled with very pure, clean water and also demonstrate water flows that are smooth, consistent, and unwavering throughout the seasons of the year - unlike rivers filled with run-off or spring and summer melt-off from snow pack, whose water flows, water clarity, and water conditions often vary highly over the course of the year.

In addition, water temperatures in spring creeks tend to vary less throughout the seasons of the year than traditional creeks and rivers because they are fed by underground water sources. Because of the depths of these water sources, spring creeks often emerge from their source or headwaters very cold and stay that way over the length of their runs. In addition, due to the consistent water flows and the fact that spring creek water is "pushed" by the force of pressure from the source rather than "pulled" by the force of gravity downhill, spring creeks can flow through very flat sections of land with minimal depths over grades that might not sustain run-off creeks and rivers. In these low-grade or flat sections of spring creeks, water flows can appear almost laminar with the surface of the creek appearing to be nearly flat and without the prominent riffles and surface disturbances caused by more rough or uneven surface bottoms found below free-stone run-off creeks and rivers surfaces.

Due to the characteristics described above, spring creeks are often well known in the context of trout and other freshwater fly fishing as excellent riparian habitats. Trout, particularly sport fish such as brown trout and rainbow trout, often thrive and grow rapidly in spring creeks due not only to the consistent water flows and low temperatures, but also due to the advantageous insect environments they foster. Insects such as mayflies (baetis and callibaetis, among others) and caddis flies find spring creek habitats very appealing and often live, mate, and hatch on these waterways in great numbers throughout the year. Because these insects in pupal and winged form represent the principal diet of freshwater trout, the fish living in spring creeks often have an ample food supply throughout the year. This element of spring creek habitats, combined with the advantageous water conditions, can create the ideal conditions for large, healthy, hefty local populations of the kind of trout that fly fishermen pursue.

Some examples of spring creeks famous for their fly fishing conditions are the Henrys Fork, in southeastern Idaho, the Silver Creek, in central southern Idaho, and the Metolius River, in central Oregon. In this context, fly fishermen often refer to creeks and rivers as "like a spring creek" if the water flows and habitat display the characteristics described above.

== See also ==
- Aquifer
- Surface runoff
- DePuy Spring Creek
