= Livingston Municipal Airport =

Livingston Municipal Airport may refer to:

- Livingston Municipal Airport (Tennessee) in Livingston, Tennessee, United States (FAA: 8A3)
- Livingston Municipal Airport (Texas) in Livingston, Texas, United States (FAA: 00R)
