= KZMY =

- Bozeman, Montana; United States
- Broadcast area: Bozeman, Montana; Helena, Montana
- Frequency: 103.5 MHz
- Branding: My 103.5

Programming
- Format: Hot adult contemporary
- Affiliations: Compass Media Networks; Premiere Networks

Ownership
- Owner: Townsquare Media; (Townsquare License, LLC)
- Sister stations: KISN, KMMS, KMMS-FM, KPRK, KXLB

History
- First air date: 2004
- Call sign meaning: "Bozeman's My" (branding)

Technical information
- Licensing authority: FCC
- Facility ID: 72722
- Class: C1
- ERP: 100,000 watts
- HAAT: 289 meters (949 feet)
- Transmitter coordinates: 45°57′25″N 111°22′11″W

Links
- Public license information: Public file; LMS
- Webcast: Listen Live
- Website: my1035.com

KZMY (103.5 FM, "My 103.5") is a radio station licensed to serve Bozeman, Montana. The station is owned by Townsquare Media, licensed to Townsquare License, LLC. It airs a hot adult contemporary music format.

All Townsquare Media Bozeman studios are located at 125 West Mendenhall Street, downtown Bozeman. KXLB, KMMS-FM, KZMY, and KISN all share a transmitter site on Green Mountain, east of Bozeman.

The station was assigned the KZMY call letters by the Federal Communications Commission on June 20, 2002.

== Ownership ==
In February 2008, Colorado-based GAPWEST Broadcasting completed the acquisition of 57 radio stations in 13 markets in the Pacific Northwest-Rocky Mountain region from Clear Channel Communications. The deal, valued at a reported $74 million, included six Bozeman stations, seven in Missoula and five in Billings. Other stations in the deal are located in Shelby, Montana, and in Casper and Cheyenne, Wyoming, plus Pocatello and Twin Falls, Idaho, and Yakima, Washington. GapWest was folded into Townsquare Media on August 13, 2010.
