= KMMS-FM =

- Bozeman, Montana; United States
- Broadcast area: Bozeman, Montana
- Frequency: 94.7 MHz
- Branding: The Moose 94.7

Programming
- Format: Adult album alternative

Ownership
- Owner: Townsquare Media; (Townsquare License, LLC)
- Sister stations: KISN; KMMS (AM); KPRK; KXLB; KZMY

History
- Former call signs: KUUB (1985–1988); KUUB-FM (1988–1991)
- Former frequencies: 95.1 MHz (1987–2020)

Technical information
- Licensing authority: FCC
- Facility ID: 24171
- Class: C3
- ERP: 5,300 watts horizontal; 18,000 watts vertical
- HAAT: 220 meters (720 ft)
- Transmitter coordinates: 45°38′19.8″N 110°15′57.5″W

Links
- Public license information: Public file; LMS
- Webcast: Listen live
- Website: mooseradio.com

KMMS-FM (94.7 MHz, "The Moose 94.7") is a radio station licensed to serve Bozeman, Montana. The station is owned by Townsquare Media, licensed to Townsquare License, LLC. It airs an adult album alternative music format.

All Townsquare Media Bozeman studios are located at 125 West Mendenhall Street, downtown Bozeman. KXLB, KMMS-FM, KZMY, and KISN all share a transmitter site on Green Mountain, east of Bozeman.

The station was assigned the KMMS-FM call letters by the Federal Communications Commission on May 15, 1991.

After 30 years on the 95.1 frequency, KMMS moved to 94.7 FM at 12 pm MT on May 28, 2020.

== Ownership ==
In February 2008, Colorado-based GAPWEST Broadcasting completed the acquisition of 57 radio stations in 13 markets in the Pacific Northwest-Rocky Mountain region from Clear Channel Communications. The deal, valued at a reported $74 million, included six Bozeman stations, seven in Missoula and five in Billings. Other stations in the deal are located in Shelby, Montana, and in Casper and Cheyenne, Wyoming, plus Pocatello and Twin Falls, Idaho, and Yakima, Washington. GapWest was folded into Townsquare Media on August 13, 2010.

== History ==
KMMS started out as KUUB 95 the Kube, Yellowstone Country's hit music. It was Bozeman's home of the original American Top 40. In 1991, the station flipped to a hybrid rock/alternative/adult rock format. This left Bozeman without a pop music station for ten years until KSCY (KISN) started transitioning from adult contemporary to top 40 in 2002.

== Translators ==
| Call sign | Frequency | City of license | FID | ERP (W) | Class | FCC info |
|---|---|---|---|---|---|---|
| K228EN | (93.5 FM) FM | Helena, Montana | | 22 | D | |
