= Lower Foster Lake =

Lake in Saskatchewan, Canada

- Location in Saskatchewan Lower Foster Lake (Canada)
- Location: Northern Administration District, Saskatchewan
- Coordinates: 56.5845°N 105.3237°W
- Type: Glacial lake
- Part of: Churchill River drainage basin
- Primary inflows: Foster River
- River sources: Canadian Shield
- Primary outflows: Foster River
- Basin countries: Canada
- Surface area: 4,466 ha (11,040 acres)
- Max. depth: 42.6 m (140 ft)
- Shore length^{1}: 248 km (154 mi)
- Settlements: None
- ^{1} Shore length is not a well-defined measure.

Lower Foster Lake is a glacial lake in the Canadian province of Saskatchewan. It is along the course of the Foster River, which is a south-flowing tributary of the Churchill River, in the Canadian Shield. The climate is subarctic.

There are no communities at the lake, nor is there any highway access. There is a small fly-in only fishing lodge.

== Description ==
Lower Foster Lake is a large, deep lake along the course of the Foster River. It is an irregularly-shaped lake that has an area of 4,466 hectares (11,040 acres) and a shoreline measuring 248 kilometres (154 mi). Its deepest point is 42.6 metres (140 ft). The Foster River flows into Lower Foster Lake over Grand Rapids from Middle Foster Lake. The river then leaves the lake at the southern end.

== Fish species ==
Fish commonly found in Lower Foster Lake include lake trout, northern pike, cisco, longnose sucker, lake whitefish, burbot, white sucker, and yellow perch.

== See also ==
- List of lakes of Saskatchewan
- Middle Foster Lake
- Upper Foster Lake
