= Upper Foster Lake =

Lake in Saskatchewan, Canada

- Location in Saskatchewan Upper Foster Lake (Canada)
- Location: Northern Saskatchewan Administration District
- Coordinates: 56.8081°N 105.2622°W
- Type: Glacial lake
- Part of: Churchill River drainage basin
- River sources: Canadian Shield
- Primary outflows: Foster River
- Basin countries: Canada
- Surface area: 10,559 ha (26,090 acres)
- Max. depth: 24.4 m (80 ft)
- Shore length^{1}: 493 km (306 mi)
- Surface elevation: 517 m (1,696 ft)
- Islands: Burnard Island; Miller Island; Partridge Island
- Settlements: None
- ^{1} Shore length is not a well-defined measure.

Upper Foster Lake is a large glacial lake in the Canadian province of Saskatchewan. It is the source of the Foster River, which is a south flowing tributary of the Churchill River. There are no communities at the lake, nor is there any highway access.

== Description ==
Covering an area of 10,559 hectares (26,090 acres) and with a shoreline measuring 493 kilometres (306 mi), Upper Foster Lake is a large lake in Northern Saskatchewan. It is irregularly shaped with many bays, peninsulas, inlets, and islands surrounded by boreal forest in the Canadian Shield. The climate is subarctic. The lake is the source of the Foster River, which flows out of the lake at its southern end. About 500 metres (1,600 ft) downstream is Middle Foster Lake.

Two islands in the lake were named after men who had lost their lives in the service of Canada. On the western side of the lake is Burnard Island, which was named after Harvey Simion Burnard. Miller Island on the eastern side was named after Alfred Stephen Miller.

== Fish species ==
Fish commonly found in Upper Foster Lake include lake trout, northern pike, cisco, white sucker, longnose sucker, lake whitefish, burbot, yellow perch, and char. There is a fly-in fishing outpost at the lake.

== See also ==
- List of lakes of Saskatchewan
- Middle Foster Lake
- Lower Foster Lake
