= Robert C. Mathis =

United States Air Force general

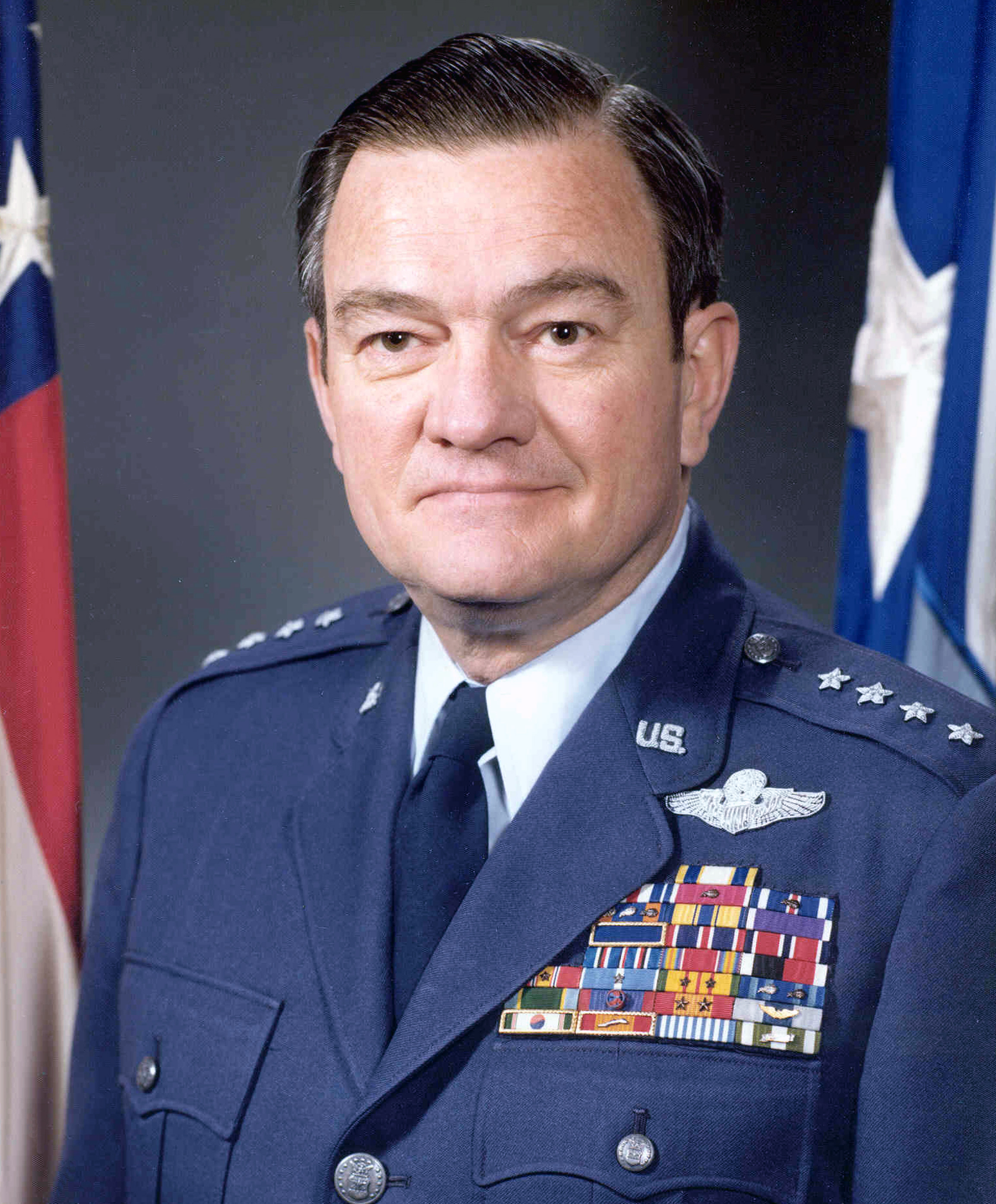
- General Robert C. Mathis
- Born: July 3, 1927; Eagle Pass, Texas, U.S.
- Died: April 27, 2016 (aged 88); Billings, Montana, U.S.
- Burial place: Sunset Hills Cemetery in Bozeman, Montana
- Military career
- Allegiance: United States of America
- Branch: United States Air Force
- Service years: 1948–1982
- Rank: General
- Conflicts: Korean War; Vietnam War
- Awards: Air Force Distinguished Service Medal; Silver Star; Legion of Merit (2)

Robert Couth Mathis (July 3, 1927 – April 27, 2016) was a United States Air Force four-star general who served as Vice Chief of Staff, U.S. Air Force (VCSAF) from 1980 to 1982.

== Biography ==
Mathis was born in 1927, in Eagle Pass, Texas, where he graduated from high school in 1944. He graduated from the United States Military Academy at West Point, New York, in 1948 with a Bachelor of Science degree and a commission as second lieutenant. Later in his career he received advanced degrees from the University of Illinois and the University of Texas.

In November 1949, after pilot training at Randolph Air Force Base, Texas, and Williams Air Force Base, Arizona, he was assigned to the 51st Fighter Group on Okinawa, a unit equipped with the F-80 Shooting Star. During the Korean War Mathis served as an F-80 fighter pilot in the 16th Fighter-Interceptor Squadron and as a forward air controller with the 6148th Tactical Control Squadron. In addition to the Purple Heart, he also received the Silver Star and Distinguished Flying Cross for his combat tour in Korea.

In August 1956, following a tour as an instructor at the United States Naval Academy, Annapolis, Maryland, he transferred to the Rome Air Development Center, Griffiss Air Force Base, New York, as the program director of the center's Trinidad Test Site. During this period he played a major role in the critical development phases of the Ballistic Missile Warning System, the Echo Satellite Program and the Project Mercury Downrange Tracking Program. After receiving his doctorate in Electrical Engineering from the University of Texas in 1963, he served as a project officer in the Development Division, Air Force Weapons Laboratory, Kirtland Air Force Base, New Mexico, where he was responsible for the development of special weapons delivery systems.

Mathis completed the Industrial College of the Armed Forces at Fort Lesley J. McNair, Washington, D.C., in August 1967 and was assigned as the senior U.S. adviser to the Vietnamese air force with IV Corps in the Mekong Delta. From October 1967 to November 1968, he flew more than 200 combat missions, including an air strike in the A-1 Skyraider for which he received his second Distinguished Flying Cross.

Mathis returned to the United States in November 1968 for duty in the Office of the Secretary of Defense. In August 1969 he was named commander of the Rome Air Development Center. Under his direction the center established one of the best flight safety and test aircraft utilization rates in the Air Force Systems Command.

In January 1971 Mathis transferred to the Aeronautical Systems Division, Wright-Patterson Air Force Base, Ohio, where he became system program director for the General Dynamics F-111 and later the F-15. During this tour of duty he also managed tactical reconnaissance, strike and electronic warfare programs.

Mathis served as deputy chief of staff, systems, at Air Force Systems Command headquarters, Andrews Air Force Base, Maryland., from October 1976 to May 1977, when he became vice commander of Air Force Systems Command. He became the vice commander of Tactical Air Command at Langley Air Force Base, Virginia, in March 1979. He became the Air Force Vice Chief of Staff on March 1, 1980. On June 1, 1982, General Robert C. Mathis retired from the Air Force.

Upon retirement, Mathis and his wife, Greta, founded Eagle Mount, a nonprofit organization for therapeutic recreation in Bozeman, Montana. Eagle Mount provides recreational services for people of all ages with physical and developmental disabilities and summer camps for children with cancer. He died on April 27, 2016, in Billings, Montana. He was cremated and later interred at Sunset Hills Cemetery in Bozeman.

== Awards and decorations ==
Command Pilot Badge

Defense Distinguished Service Medal
Air Force Distinguished Service Medal
Silver Star
Legion of Merit with one bronze oak leaf cluster
Distinguished Flying Cross with oak leaf cluster
Purple Heart
Air Medal with eleven oak leaf clusters
Air Force Commendation Medal
Air Force Presidential Unit Citation
Air Force Outstanding Unit Award
Air Force Organizational Excellence Award
American Campaign Medal
World War II Victory Medal
Army of Occupation Medal
National Defense Service Medal with one bronze service star
Korean Service Medal with five campaign stars
Vietnam Service Medal with two campaign stars
Air Force Longevity Service Award with seven oak leaf clusters
Small Arms Expert Marksmanship Medal
Vietnam Air Force Distinguished Service Order, 1st Class
Vietnam Gallantry Cross with two gold stars
Vietnam Air Gallantry Cross with gold wings
Republic of Korea Presidential Unit Citation
Vietnam Gallantry Cross Unit Citation
United Nations Korea Medal
Vietnam Campaign Medal

Military offices
Preceded by Gen. James A. Hill	Vice Chief of Staff of the United States Air Force; 1980–1982	Succeeded by Gen. Jerome F. O'Malley
