= Middle Foster Lake =

Lake in Saskatchewan, Canada

- Location in Saskatchewan Middle Foster Lake (Canada)
- Location: Northern Administration District, Saskatchewan
- Coordinates: 56.5868°N 105.4982°W
- Type: Glacial Lake
- Part of: Churchill River drainage basin
- Primary inflows: Foster River
- River sources: Canadian Shield
- Primary outflows: Foster River
- Basin countries: Canada
- Surface area: 3,694 ha (9,130 acres)
- Max. depth: 20.8 m (68 ft)
- Shore length^{1}: 96 km (60 mi)
- Surface elevation: 511 m (1,677 ft)
- Settlements: None
- ^{1} Shore length is not a well-defined measure.

Middle Foster Lake is a glacial lake in Saskatchewan, Canada. It is along the course of the Foster River, which is a south-flowing tributary of the Churchill River, in the Canadian Shield. Upstream is Upper Foster Lake and downstream is Lower Foster Lake. The climate is subarctic.

There are no communities at the lake, nor is there any highway access. There is a small fly-in fishing lodge located at the lake's eastern end.

== Description ==
Middle Foster Lake is an irregularly-shaped glacial lake in northern Saskatchewan. It covers an area of 3,694 hectares (9,130 acres) and has a shoreline measuring about 96 kilometres (60 mi) long. It is almost 21 metres (69 ft) deep at its deepest point. Its primary inflow and outflow is the Foster River. The Foster River begins at Upper Foster Lake and flows for about 500 metres (1,600 ft) south into the northern end of Middle Foster Lake. The river exits the lake over the Grand Rapids at the lake's eastern end. The Grand Rapids separate Middle and Lower Foster Lakes. On Middle Lake's shore, near the rapids, is a fly-in only fishing lodge.

== Fish species ==
Fish commonly found in Middle Foster Lake include walleye, lake trout, northern pike, cisco, longnose sucker, lake whitefish, burbot, white sucker, and yellow perch.

== See also ==
- List of lakes of Saskatchewan
- Lower Foster Lake
- Upper Foster Lake
