= Gallatin High School (Bozeman, Montana) =

Location
- 4455 Annie Street; Bozeman, Montana 59718; United States
- Coordinates: 45°41′29″N 111°06′04″W

Information
- Type: Public
- Established: 2020, 6 years ago
- School district: Bozeman School District
- Grades: 9–12
- Enrollment: 1,480 (2023–2024)
- Colors: Blue and black
- Mascot: Velociraptor
- Team name: Raptors
- Website: ghs.bsd7.org

Gallatin High School is one of two public high schools in Bozeman, Montana, and opened in 2020 to address concerns of the city's rapidly growing population. In 2023, enrollment was roughly 1,480 students, making it the largest high school in Bozeman.

== History ==
Gallatin High School was opened in the fall of 2020. The city of Bozeman, as one of the fastest growing cities in the United States, was running out of room in the city's only public high school at the time, Bozeman High School, spurring the school's creation. Gallatin High School was placed in the northwest portion of Bozeman, where the majority of new development is located.

The school's mascot was picked via a district-wide election process open to all students of the district. Other contenders included the Cutthroats and the Lizards. The school's name was picked through a similar process. The current mascot, the Raptors, contrasts well with Bozeman High School's Hawks, as both can be types of birds. Raptors here, however, refers to Velociraptors.

== Curriculum and awards ==
Like Bozeman High School, Gallatin High School offers two main types of diplomas: The standard diploma, and diplomas with distinctions. GHS offers a career and technical education (CTE) distinction, a fine arts distinction, a humanities distinction, a merit distinction, and a STEM distinction.

Gallatin High School also offers numerous Advanced Placement Courses.

== Facilities ==
Gallatin High School contains numerous shop spaces and a large auditorium. The school was also supposed to have its own football stadium, but it was deemed unsafe shortly after opening. In lieu of their own stadium, GHS sports teams utilize Bozeman High School's Van Winkle Stadium.
