= Human Resource Development Council =

Organization promoting workforce development and education

The Human Resource Development Council (HRDC) is an American not-for-profit corporation based in Bozeman, Montana, providing volunteer and community development organization in three counties – Gallatin, Park and Meagher Counties. It was founded in 1975.

HRDC occupies one of Bozeman's notable historical buildings, the first Federal Building and Post Office built in 1915.

== The Fork and Spoon ==
The Fork and Spoon is a service funded through the HRDC. It is the first pay-what-you-can restaurant in Montana.

== Streamline bus ==
HRDC operates the Streamline bus, which runs bidirectionally around Gallatin Valley. Weekday routes include Purple line, Blue line, Gold line, Brown line, and Pink line. The bus also runs during the weekends, with the exception of Pink line and a shorter area being covered by Gold line. Commuter lines to the neighboring towns of Livingston and Belgrade also run year-round. Buses are operated by Karst Stage.
