= Bozeman, Montana =

Bozeman
- City
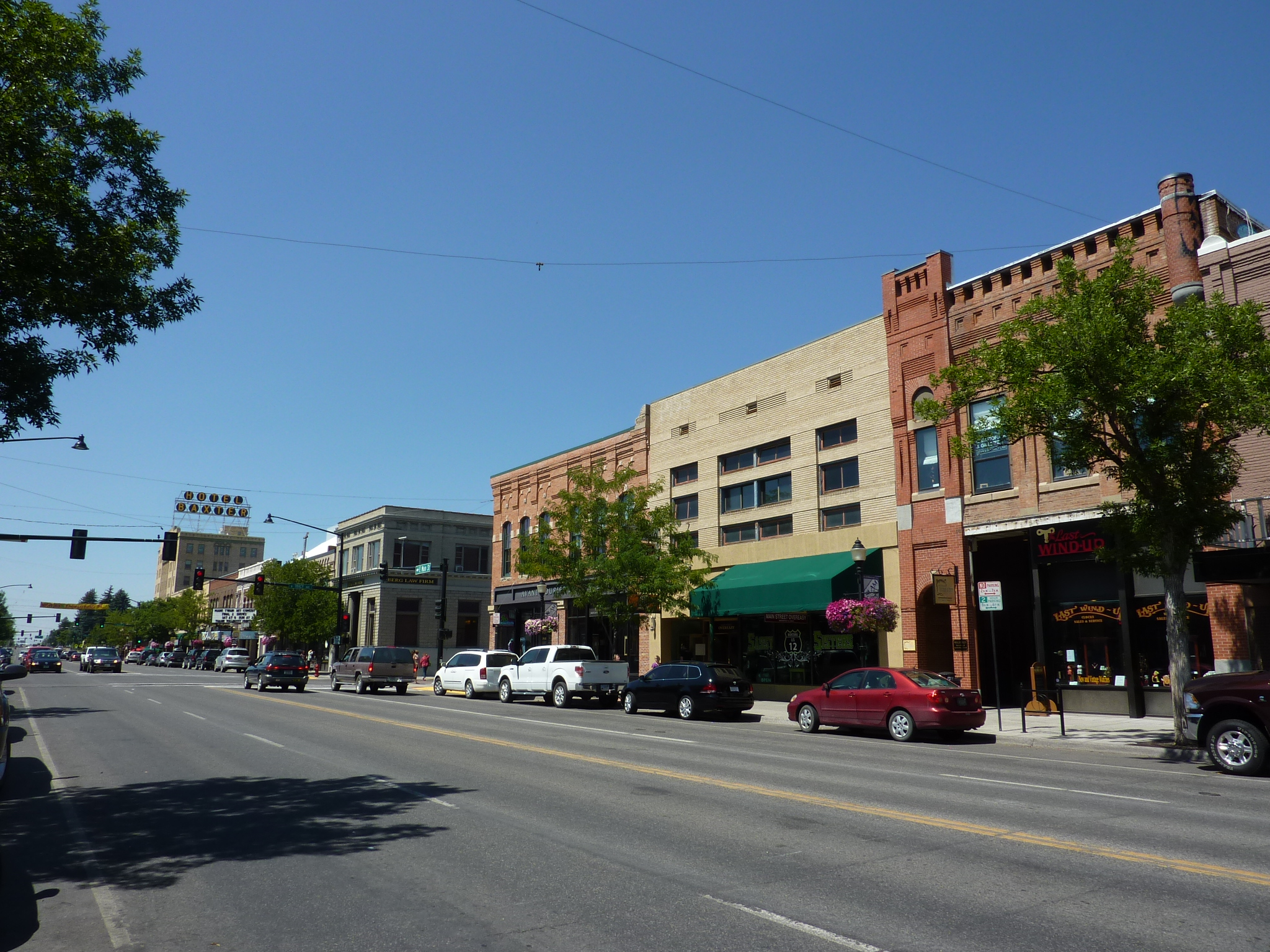
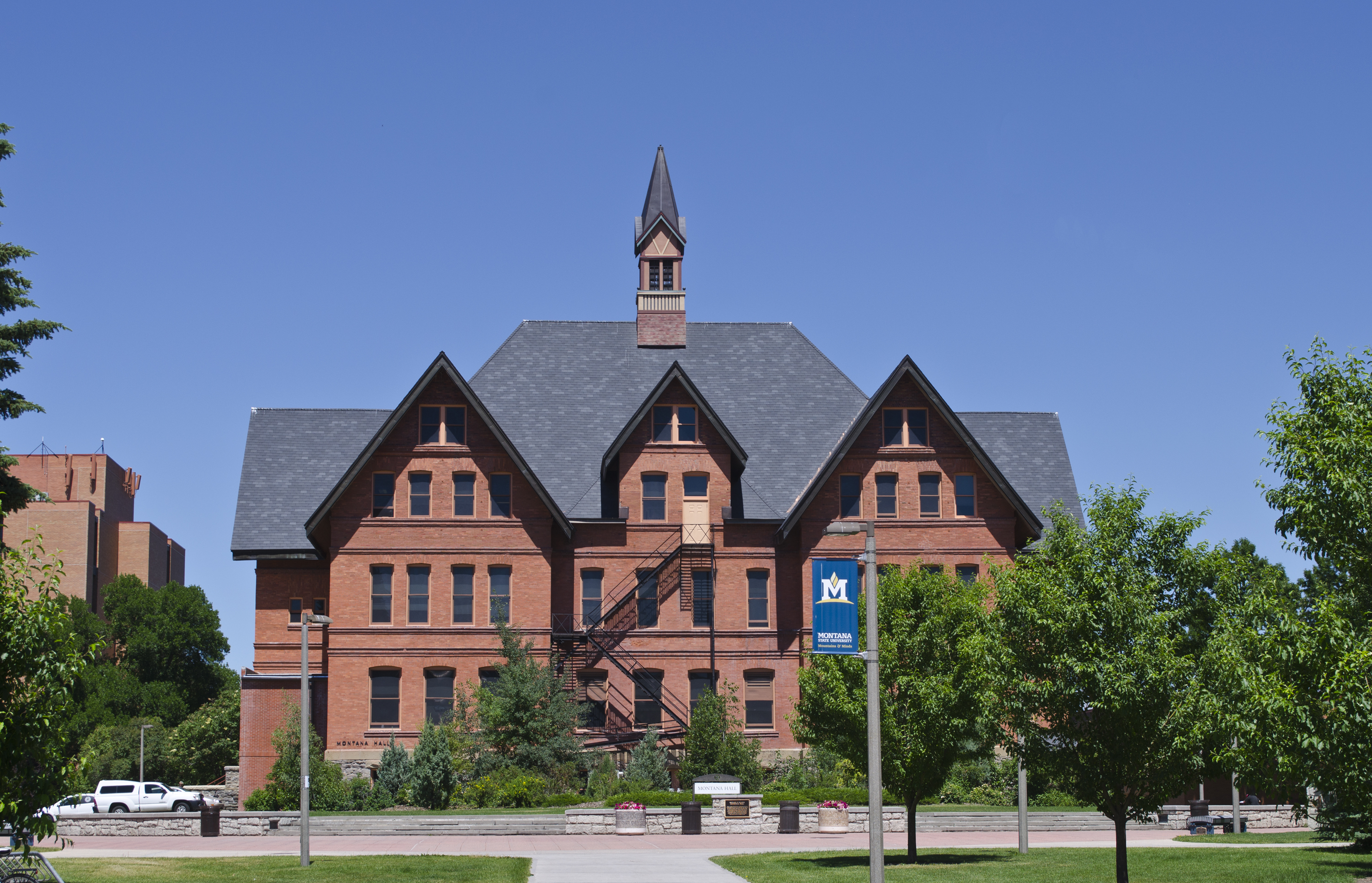
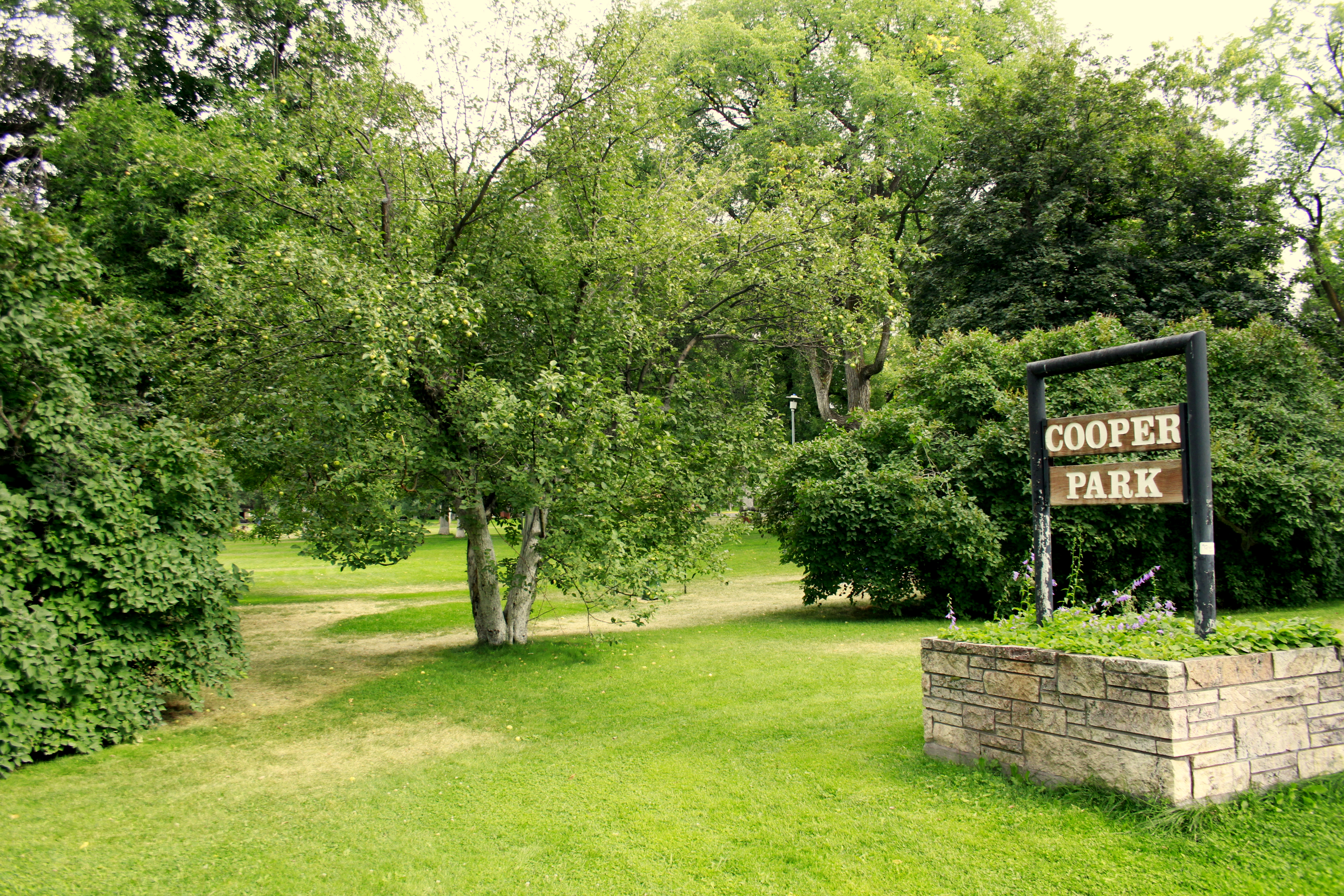
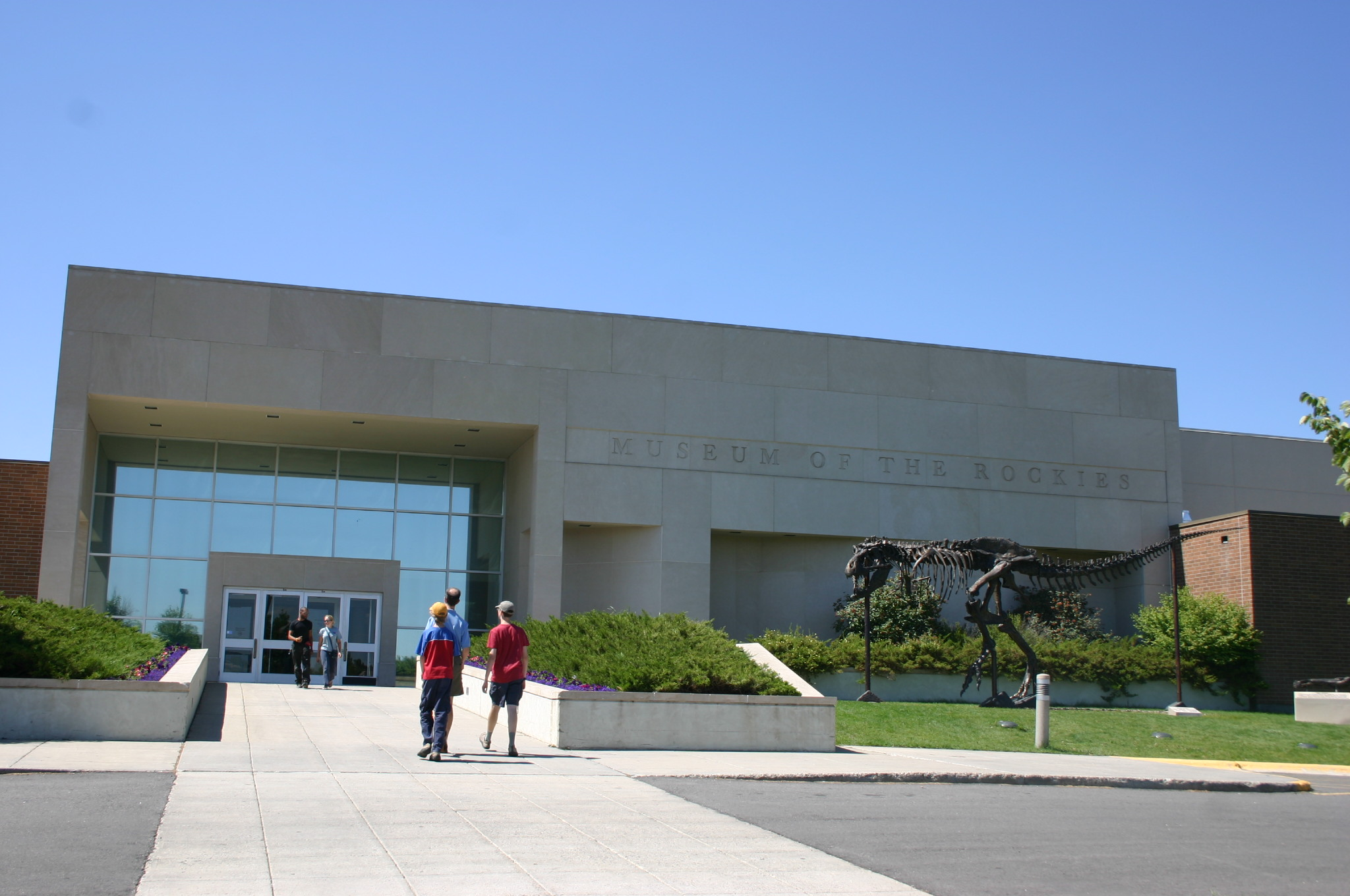
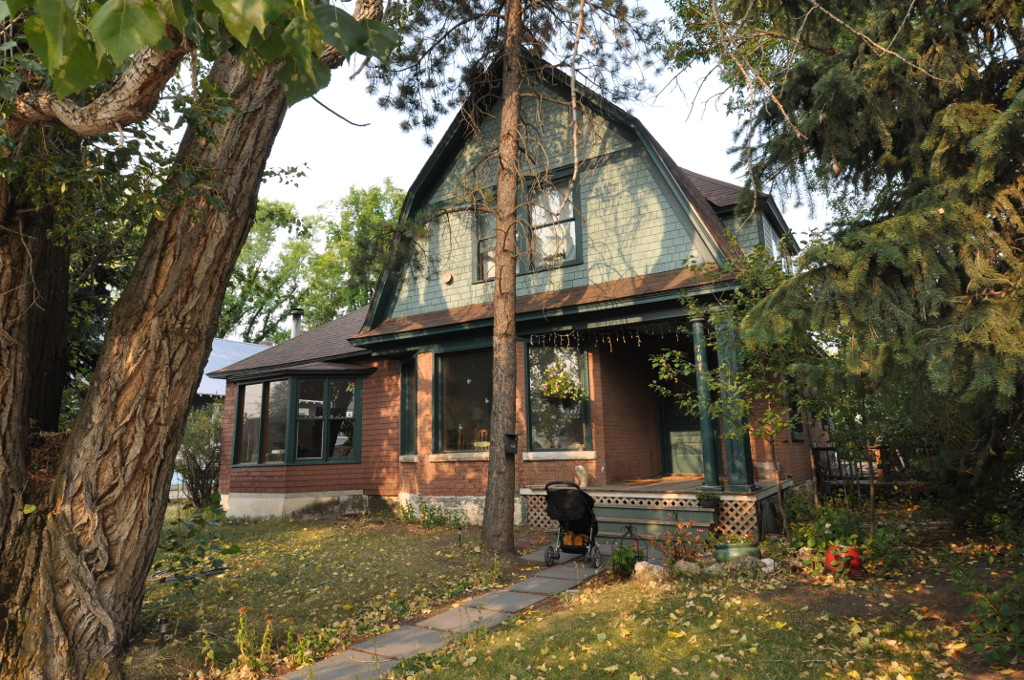
- Downtown Bozeman Montana State University Cooper Park Museum of the Rockies Bozeman Brewery Historic District

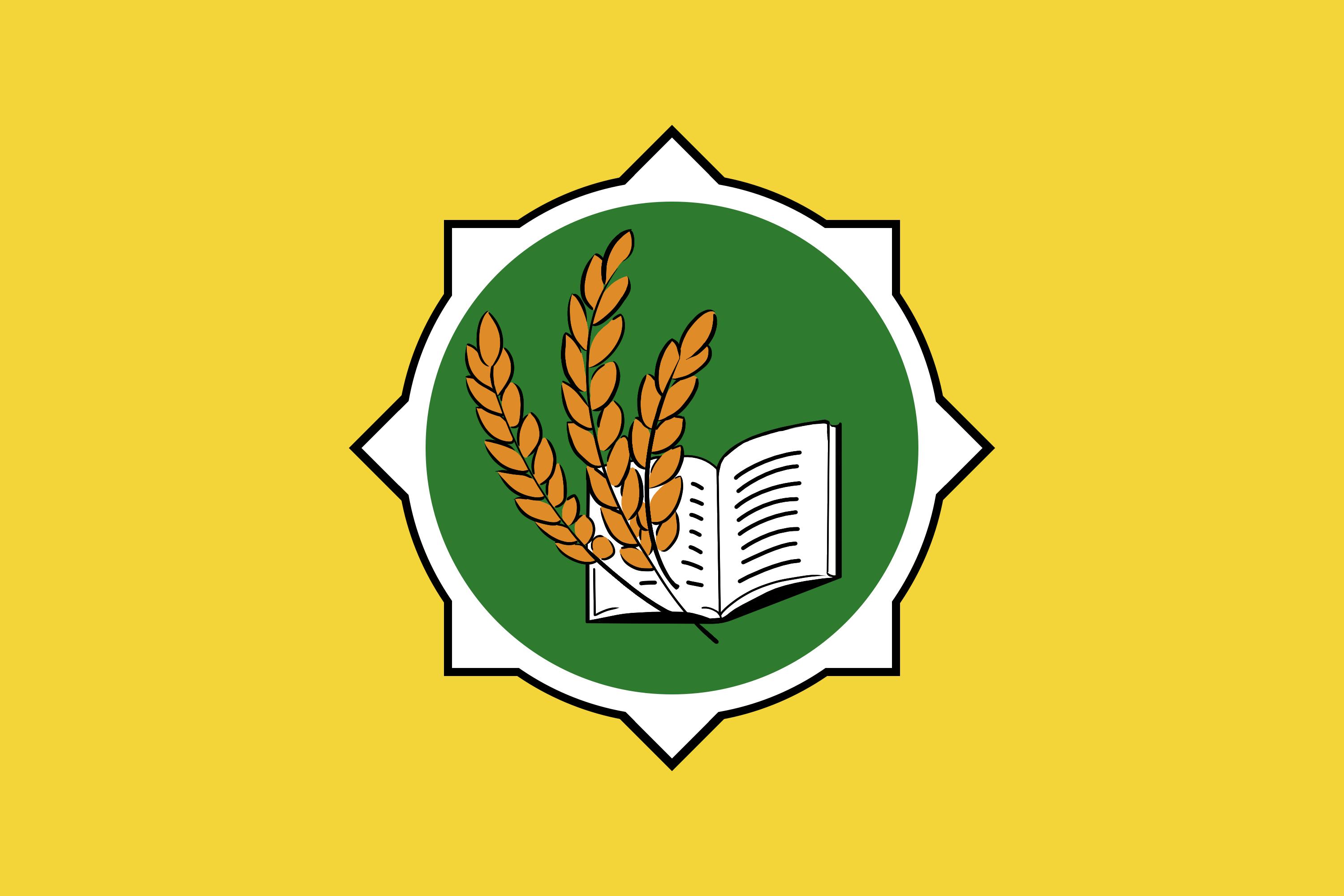
- Flag Seal
- Interactive map of Bozeman
- Location within Montana Location within the United States
- Coordinates: 45°40′46″N 111°02′14″W
- Country: United States
- State: Montana
- County: Gallatin
- Founded: August 9, 1864
- Named for: John Bozeman

Government
  - Type: City commission/City manager
  - Mayor: Joey Morrison

Area
  - City: 20.91 sq mi (54.16 km^{2})
  - Land: 20.86 sq mi (54.04 km^{2})
  - Water: 0.050 sq mi (0.13 km^{2})
- Elevation: 4,817 ft (1,468 m)

Population (2020)
  - City: 53,293
  - Estimate (2025): 58,814
  - Density: 2,554.4/sq mi (986.26/km^{2})
  - Metro: 118,960
  - Demonym: Bozemanite
- Time zone: UTC−7 (MST)
  - Summer (DST): UTC−6 (MDT)
- ZIP Codes: 59715, 59717–59719, 59718, 59771–59772
- Area code: 406
- FIPS code: 30-08950
- GNIS feature ID: 2409889
- Website: www.bozemanmt.gov

Bozeman (/ˈboʊzmən/ BOHZ-mən) is a city in and the county seat of Gallatin County, Montana, United States. As of the 2020 United States census, Bozeman's population was 53,293, making it Montana's fourth-largest city. It is the principal city of the Bozeman, Montana, metropolitan statistical area, consisting of all of Gallatin County, with a population of 118,960. It is the second-largest by population of Montana's statistical areas.

== History ==
=== Early history ===
For many years, indigenous people of the United States, including the Shoshone, Nez Perce, Blackfeet, Flathead, Crow, and Sioux traveled through the area, called the "Valley of the Flowers." The Gallatin Valley in particular, in which Bozeman is located, was primarily within the territory of the Crow people.

=== 19th century ===
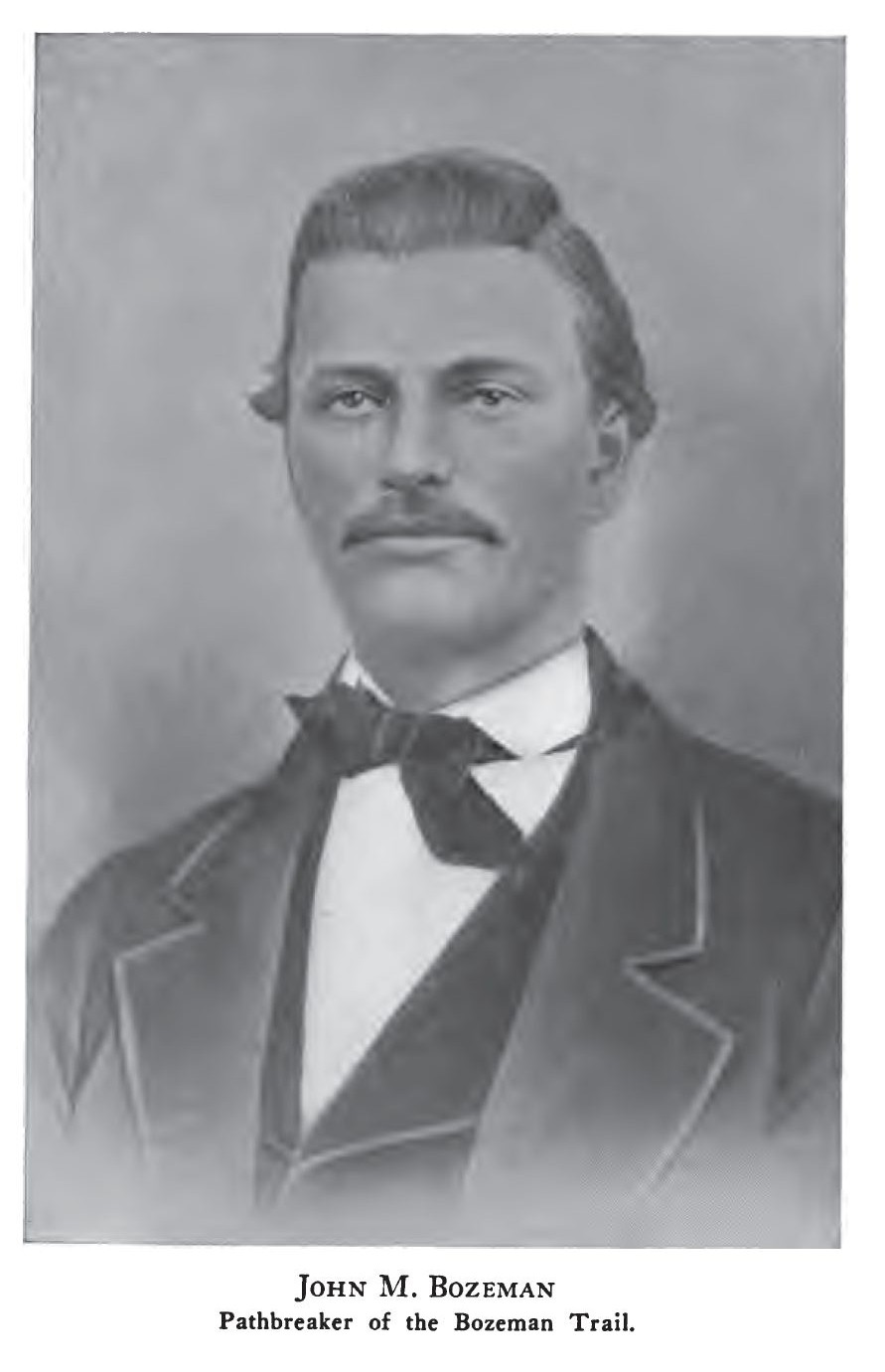
John Bozeman

William Clark visited the area in July 1806 as he traveled east from Three Forks along the Gallatin River. The party camped 3 miles (4.8 km) east of what is now Bozeman, at the mouth of Kelly Canyon. The journal entries from Clark's party briefly describe the future city's location.

==== John Bozeman ====
In 1863, John Bozeman, a pioneer and frontiersman from Pickens County, Georgia, along with a partner named John Jacob, opened the Bozeman Trail, a new northern trail off the Oregon Trail leading to the mining town of Virginia City through the Gallatin Valley and the future location of the city of Bozeman.

John Bozeman, with Daniel Rouse and William Beall, platted the town in August 1864, stating "standing right in the gate of the mountains ready to swallow up all tenderfeet that would reach the territory from the east, with their golden fleeces to be taken care of." Red Cloud's War closed the Bozeman Trail in 1868, but the town's fertile land still attracted permanent settlers.

Bozeman's death has been the source of much controversy. For years, the story was circulated that Bozeman and one of his friends, Tom Cover, were hiking to a neighboring town when Blackfeet attacked and killed Bozeman. Some accounts suggest that Cover committed the murder and blamed the Blackfeet for it.

==== Nelson Story ====
In 1866, Nelson Story, a successful Virginia City, Montana, gold miner originally from Ohio, entered the cattle business. Story braved the hostile Bozeman Trail to successfully drive some 1,000 head of Longhorn cattle into Paradise Valley just east of Bozeman. Eluding the U.S. Army, which tried to turn Story back to protect the drive from hostile Indigenous Americans, Story's cattle formed one of the earliest significant herds in Montana's cattle industry. Story established a sizable ranch in the Paradise Valley, with holdings in the Gallatin Valley. He later donated land to the state for the establishment of Montana State University.

==== Fort Ellis ====
Fort Ellis was established in 1867 by Captain R. S. LaMotte and two companies of the 2nd Cavalry, after the murder of John Bozeman near the mouth of Mission Creek on the Yellowstone River, and considerable political disturbance in the area led local settlers and miners to feel a need for added protection. The fort, named for Gettysburg casualty Colonel Augustus Van Horne Ellis, was decommissioned in 1886, and few remnants are left at the actual site, now occupied by the Fort Ellis Experimental Station of Montana State University. In addition to Fort Ellis, a short-lived fort, Fort Elizabeth Meagher (also simply known as Fort Meagher), was established in 1867 by volunteer militiamen. This fort was located 8 miles (12.9 km) east of town on Rocky Creek.

=== Other ===
In 1864, W. W. Alderson described Gallatin County as "one of the most beautiful and picturesque valleys the eye ever beheld, abounding in springs of clear water." Many tended to agree, and Bozeman quickly garnered the nickname of "The Egypt" of Montana.

After incorporation, the first issue of the weekly Avant Courier newspaper, the precursor of today's Bozeman Chronicle, was published in Bozeman on September 13, 1871.

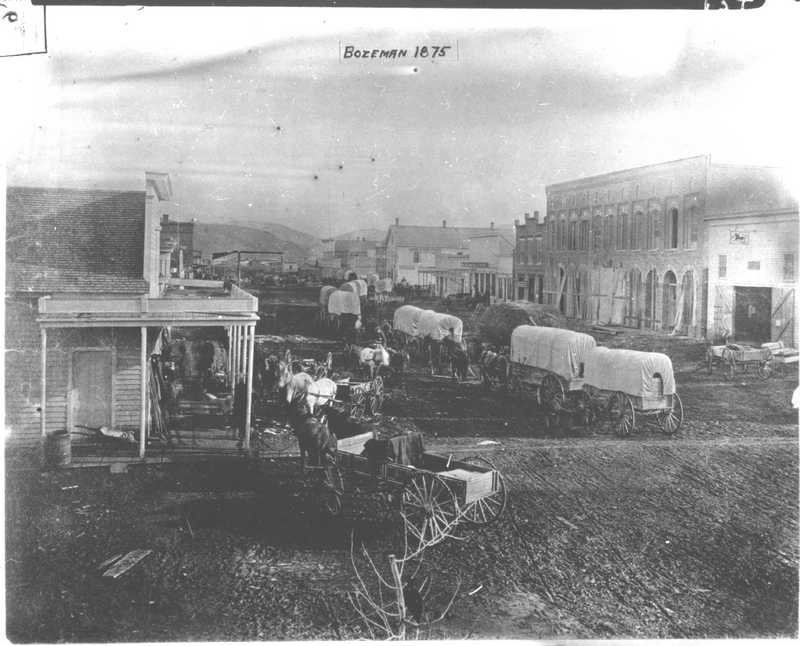
Main Street in Bozeman, 1875

Bozeman's main cemetery, Sunset Hills Cemetery, was given to the city in 1872, when English lawyer and philanthropist William Henry Blackmore purchased the land after his wife Mary Blackmore died of pneumonia in Bozeman in July 1872.

The first library in Bozeman was formed by the Young Men's Library Association in a room above a drugstore in 1872. It later moved to the mayor's office and was taken over by the city in 1890. The first Grange meeting in Montana Territory was held in Bozeman in 1873. The Northern Pacific Railway reached Bozeman from the east in 1883. By 1900, Bozeman's population had reached 3,500.

In 1891, Congress approved funding for a fish-rearing station in the Rocky Mountain region. In 1892, the United States Commission of Fish and Fisheries established a fish hatchery on Bridger Creek at the entrance to Bridger Canyon. The fourth-oldest fish hatchery in the United States, the facility ceased to be primarily a hatchery in 1966 and became the U.S. Fish and Wildlife Service's Bozeman National Fish Hatchery, later a fish technology and health center. The center receives around 5,000 visitors a year, observing biologists working on diet testing, feed manufacturing technology, fish diseases, brood stock development, and improvement of water quality.

Bozeman was home to early minor league baseball. In 1892, Bozeman fielded a team in the Class B level Montana State League. In 1909, the Bozeman Irrigators played as members of the Class D level Inter-Mountain League. Both leagues disbanded.

Montana State University was established in 1893 as the state's land-grant college, then named the Agricultural College of the State of Montana. By the 1920s, the institution was known as Montana State College, and in 1965, it became Montana State University. Montana State University's largest campus is in Bozeman, enrolling 17,165 students as of fall 2025.

=== 20th century ===
Bozeman's first high school, Gallatin Valley High School, was built on West Main Street in 1902. Later known as Willson School, named for notable Bozeman architect Fred Fielding Willson, son of Lester S. Willson, the building still stands today and functions as administrative offices for the Bozeman School District.

In the early 20th century, over 17,000 acres (69 km^{2}) of the Gallatin Valley were planted in edible peas harvested for both canning and seed. By the 1920s, canneries in the Bozeman area were major producers of canned peas, and at one point, Bozeman produced roughly 75% of all seed peas in the United States. The area was once known as the "Sweet Pea Capital of the Nation", referencing the prolific edible pea crop. To promote the area and celebrate its prosperity, local business owners began a "Sweet Pea Carnival" that included a parade and queen contest. The annual event lasted from 1906 to 1916. Promoters used the inedible but fragrant and colorful sweet pea flower as an emblem of the celebration. In 1977, the "Sweet Pea" concept was revived as an arts festival rather than a harvest celebration, growing into a three-day event that is one of the largest festivals in Montana.

The first federal building and post office was built in 1915. Many years later, while unused, it became a film location, along with downtown Bozeman, in A River Runs Through It (1992) by Robert Redford, starring Brad Pitt. It is now used by Human Resource Development Council, a community organization.

In 1986, the 60-acre (24 ha) site of the Idaho Pole Co. on Rouse Avenue was designated a Superfund site and placed on the National Priorities List. Idaho Pole treated wood products with creosote and pentachlorophenol on the site between 1945 and 1997.

The Museum of the Rockies, created in 1957 as the gift from Butte physician Caroline McGill, is a part of Montana State University and an affiliate institution of the Smithsonian. It is a natural and cultural history museum and houses permanent exhibits on dinosaurs, geology, and Montana history, as well as a planetarium and a living history farm. Paleontologist Jack Horner was the museum's first curator of paleontology and brought national notice to the museum for his fossil discoveries in the 1980s.

=== 21st century ===
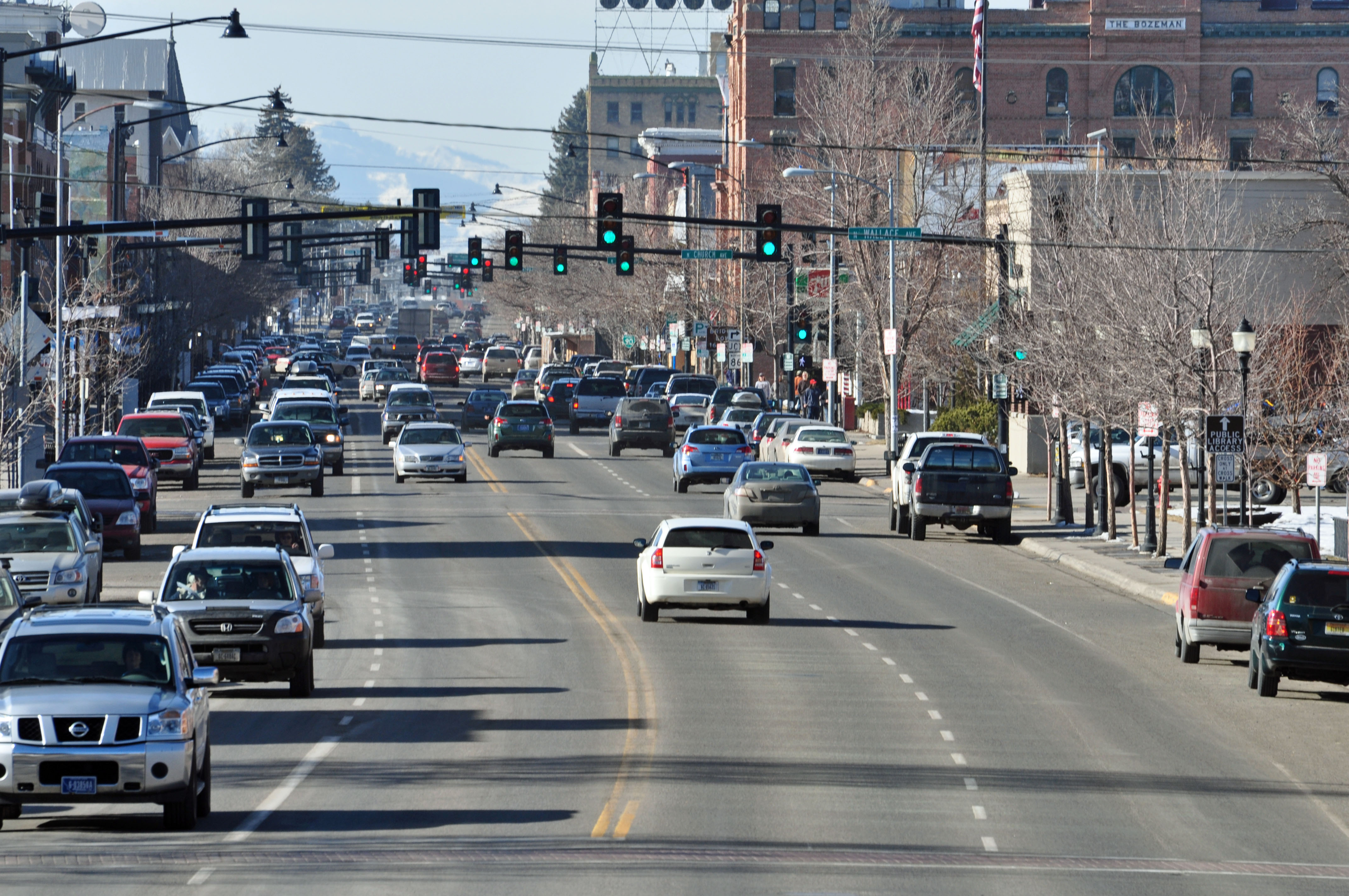
Main Street in Bozeman, 2011

From a rank of sixth in the early 1980s, Bozeman has grown to become the fourth-largest city in Montana with a population of 56,114.

Growth in the Gallatin Valley prompted the Gallatin Airport Authority in 2009 to expand the Gallatin Field Airport with two new gates, an expanded passenger screening area, and a third baggage carousel. Subsequently, Gallatin Field was renamed Bozeman Yellowstone International Airport. Bozeman has been one of Montana's fastest-growing cities from 1990 into the new millennium, currently growing at a fluctuating rate around 2–3% annually.

In 2020, a second high school named Gallatin High School opened in Bozeman. In 2009, a natural gas explosion on the 200 block of East Main Street destroyed five buildings housing several businesses, including Boodles Restaurant and the Montana Trails Gallery. The explosion, caused by a separation in an underground gas line, killed a 36-year-old gallery employee, and the resulting fire burned for more than a day.

== Geography ==
Bozeman is located at an elevation of 1,470 m (4,820 ft). The Bridger Mountains are to the north-northeast, the Tobacco Root Mountains to the west-southwest, the Big Belt Mountains and Horseshoe Hills to the northwest, the Hyalite Peaks of the northern Gallatin Range to the south and the Spanish Peaks of the northern Madison Range to the south-southwest. Bozeman is east of the continental divide, and Interstate 90 passes through the city. It is 84 miles (135 km) east of Butte, 125 miles (201 km) west of Billings, and 93 miles (150 km) north of Yellowstone National Park.

According to the United States Census Bureau, the city has a total area of 19.15 square miles (49.60 km^{2}), of which 0.03 sq mi (0.08 km^{2}) is covered by water.

=== Climate ===
Bozeman experiences a humid continental climate (Köppen: Dfb) as it is located in a more humid microclimate setting. Bozeman and the surrounding area receive significantly higher rainfall than much of the central and eastern parts of the state, up to 24 inches (610 mm) of precipitation annually compared to the 8 to 12 inches (200 to 300 mm) common throughout much of Montana east of the Continental Divide. Combined with fertile soils, this means plant growth is relatively lush. This undoubtedly contributed to the Gallatin Valley's early nickname as the "Valley of the Flowers", as well as the establishment of Montana State University, the state's agricultural college, in the city. Bozeman has cold, snowy winters and relatively warm summers, though due to high elevation, temperature changes from day to night can be significant. The highest temperature ever recorded in Bozeman was 105 °F (40.6 °C) on July 31, 1892. The lowest recorded temperature, −46 °F (−43.3 °C), occurred in 1957 and 1983.

In 2019, Bozeman experienced unusually warm and dry temperatures during December. Montana State University campus reported a daily average of 0.2 inches (5.1 mm) of precipitation for the month, some of the lowest numbers seen in over 120 years. The school also recorded just over 3 inches (0.076 m) of snowfall during December, the second-lowest snowfall ever recorded for that month. Additionally, maximum temperatures were 2 °F (1 °C) warmer and lowest temperatures were 6 °F (3 °C) above typical standards in previous Decembers. December 2023 was also unusually warm and dry, in line with the country as a whole.

Climate data for Bozeman, Montana (Montana State University), 1991–2020 normals, extremes 1892–present
Month	Jan	Feb	Mar	Apr	May	Jun	Jul	Aug	Sep	Oct	Nov	Dec	Year
Record high °F (°C)	65 (18)	65 (18)	78 (26)	83 (28)	91 (33)	96 (36)	105 (41)	100 (38)	99 (37)	88 (31)	73 (23)	64 (18)	105 (41)
Mean maximum °F (°C)	51.6 (10.9)	54.0 (12.2)	63.7 (17.6)	74.0 (23.3)	79.8 (26.6)	87.8 (31.0)	93.2 (34.0)	92.6 (33.7)	87.7 (30.9)	77.3 (25.2)	62.4 (16.9)	51.8 (11.0)	94.8 (34.9)
Mean daily maximum °F (°C)	34.2 (1.2)	36.8 (2.7)	46.1 (7.8)	54.5 (12.5)	63.2 (17.3)	71.7 (22.1)	82.1 (27.8)	81.3 (27.4)	71.4 (21.9)	57.3 (14.1)	42.3 (5.7)	33.3 (0.7)	56.2 (13.4)
Daily mean °F (°C)	24.6 (−4.1)	26.7 (−2.9)	35.0 (1.7)	42.5 (5.8)	51.0 (10.6)	58.6 (14.8)	66.9 (19.4)	65.6 (18.7)	56.9 (13.8)	44.9 (7.2)	32.3 (0.2)	23.9 (−4.5)	44.1 (6.7)
Mean daily minimum °F (°C)	15.1 (−9.4)	16.6 (−8.6)	23.9 (−4.5)	30.5 (−0.8)	38.8 (3.8)	45.6 (7.6)	51.7 (10.9)	50.0 (10.0)	42.4 (5.8)	32.4 (0.2)	22.2 (−5.4)	14.5 (−9.7)	32.0 (0.0)
Mean minimum °F (°C)	−10.3 (−23.5)	−5.9 (−21.1)	3.0 (−16.1)	16.1 (−8.8)	26.3 (−3.2)	33.2 (0.7)	41.6 (5.3)	38.9 (3.8)	29.5 (−1.4)	13.9 (−10.1)	−0.4 (−18.0)	−9.0 (−22.8)	−18.7 (−28.2)
Record low °F (°C)	−45 (−43)	−43 (−42)	−29 (−34)	−10 (−23)	16 (−9)	26 (−3)	32 (0)	26 (−3)	12 (−11)	−10 (−23)	−26 (−32)	−46 (−43)	−46 (−43)
Average precipitation inches (mm)	0.86 (22)	0.83 (21)	1.42 (36)	2.51 (64)	2.93 (74)	3.27 (83)	1.33 (34)	1.32 (34)	1.44 (37)	1.84 (47)	1.25 (32)	1.03 (26)	20.03 (510)
Average snowfall inches (cm)	12.7 (32)	13.0 (33)	13.1 (33)	12.9 (33)	3.6 (9.1)	0.8 (2.0)	0.0 (0.0)	0.1 (0.25)	0.4 (1.0)	6.0 (15)	12.5 (32)	16.2 (41)	91.3 (231.35)
Average extreme snow depth inches (cm)	11.8 (30)	11.9 (30)	9.5 (24)	4.2 (11)	1.0 (2.5)	.2 (0.51)	0 (0)	0 (0)	0 (0)	2.3 (5.8)	6.5 (17)	10.8 (27)	15.4 (39)
Average precipitation days (≥ 0.01 in.)	10.7	9.5	11.8	13.7	15.4	15.3	10.1	10.1	9.0	11.0	10.2	11.0	137.8
Average snowy days (≥ 0.1 in.)	9.2	8.4	8.4	6.7	1.5	0.2	0.0	0.0	0.2	3.0	7.1	9.4	54.1
Source 1: NOAA
Source 2: National Weather Service

== Demographics ==
Historical population
Census	Pop.	Note	%±
1870	168		—
1880	894		432.1%
1890	2,143		139.7%
1900	3,419		59.5%
1910	5,187		51.7%
1920	6,183		19.2%
1930	6,855		10.9%
1940	8,665		26.4%
1950	11,325		30.7%
1960	13,361		18.0%
1970	18,670		39.7%
1980	21,645		15.9%
1990	22,660		4.7%
2000	27,509		21.4%
2010	37,280		35.5%
2020	53,293		43.0%
2025 (est.)	58,814		10.4%
source: U.S. Decennial Census

=== 2020 census ===
As of the 2020 census, Bozeman had a population of 53,293 and 21,735 households. The population density was 2,587.2 inhabitants per square mile (998.9/km^{2}). About 99.6% of residents lived in urban areas, while 0.4% lived in rural areas.

The median age was 28.1 years; 15.4% of the residents were under 18 and 10.4% were 65 or older. For every 100 females, there were 108.9 males, and for every 100 females 18 and over, there were 110.2 males.

For residents 25 or older, 97.8% had graduated from high school or higher, and 64.2% held at least a bachelor's degree.

Of the 21,735 households, 21.5% had children under 18 living in them. About 33.6% were married-couple households, 27.9% had a male householder with no spouse or partner present, and 28.2% had a female householder with no spouse or partner present. Roughly 31.1% of all households were made up of individuals, 8.9% had someone living alone who was 65 or older, and the average household size was 2.24 people.

The city had 23,535 housing units, of which 7.6% were vacant. The homeowner vacancy rate was 1.4% and the rental vacancy rate was 4.0%.

Racial composition as of the 2020 census
Race	Number	Percentage
White	47,020	88.2%
Black or African American	331	0.6%
American Indian and Alaska Native	618	1.2%
Asian	956	1.8%
Native Hawaiian and other Pacific Islander	53	0.1%
Some other race	897	1.7%
Two or more races	3,418	6.4%
Hispanic or Latino (of any race)	2,646	5.0%

=== 2010 census ===
As of the census of 2010, 37,280 people, 15,775 households, and 6,900 families were residing in the city. The population density was 1,949.8 inhabitants per square mile (752.8/km^{2}). The 17,464 housing units had an average density of 913.4 per square mile (352.7/km^{2}). The racial makeup of the city was 93.6% White, 0.5% African American, 1.1% [Native American, 1.9% Asian, 0.1% Pacific Islander, 0.7% from other races, and 2.1% from two or more races. Hispanics or Latinos of any race were 2.9% of the population.

Of the 15,775 households, 21.3% had children under 18 living with them, 33.1% were married couples living together, 7.0% had a female householder with no husband present, 3.6% had a male householder with no wife present, and 56.3% were not families. About 33.5% of all households were made up of individuals, and 7.6% had someone living alone who was 65 or older. The average household size was 2.17, and the average family size was 2.80.

The median age in the city was 27.2 years, The age distribution was 15.7% under 18, 28.2% from 18 to 24, 31.4% from 25 to 44, 16.7% from 45 to 64, and 8.1% were 65 or older. The gender makeup of the city was 52.6% male and 47.4% female.

=== 2000 census ===
As of the 2000 United States census, 27,509 people, 10,877 households, and 5,014 families resided in the city. The population density was 2,183.8 inhabitants per square mile (843.2/km^{2}). The 11,577 housing units had an average density of 919.0 per square mile (354.8/km^{2}). The racial makeup of the city was 94.73% White, 0.33% African American, 1.24% Native American, 1.62% Asian, 0.07% Pacific Islander, 0.54% from other races, and 1.47% from two or more races. Hispanics or Latinos of any race were 1.59% of the population.

Of the 10,877 households, 22.3% had children under 18 living with them, 36.0% were married couples living together, 7.3% had a female householder with no husband present, and 53.9% were not families. Around 30.4% of all households were made up of individuals, and 6.7% had someone living alone who was 65 or older. The average household size was 2.26, and the average family size was 2.85.

In the city, the age distribution was 16.0% under 18, 33.0% from 18 to 24, 28.6% from 25 to 44, 14.4% from 45 to 64, and 8.0% who were 65 or older. The median age was 25 years. For every 100 females, there were 111.2 males. For every 100 females 18 and over, there were 112.6 males.

In the city, the median income for a household was $32,156 and for a family was $41,723. Males had a median income of $28,794 versus $20,743 for females. The per capita income for the city was $16,104. About 9.2% of families and 20.2% of the population were below the poverty line, including 14.8% of those under 18 and 4.4% of those 65 or over.

== Economy ==
Bozeman's top employers include Bozeman Health, Montana State University, Simms Fishing Products, and Mystery Ranch as well as at least two dozen high-tech companies engaged in research or production of lasers and other optical equipment, over a dozen bio-tech companies, and several large software companies. Nationally known companies based in Bozeman include ILX Lightwave (an MKS/Newport company), Quantel USA, RightNow Technologies, Snowflake Inc., Schedulicity, Workiva, onX, and Simms Fishing Products. Notable nonprofit organizations based in Bozeman include the Greater Yellowstone Coalition, Human Resource Development Council, and Eagle Mount.

== Arts and culture ==
=== Points of interest ===
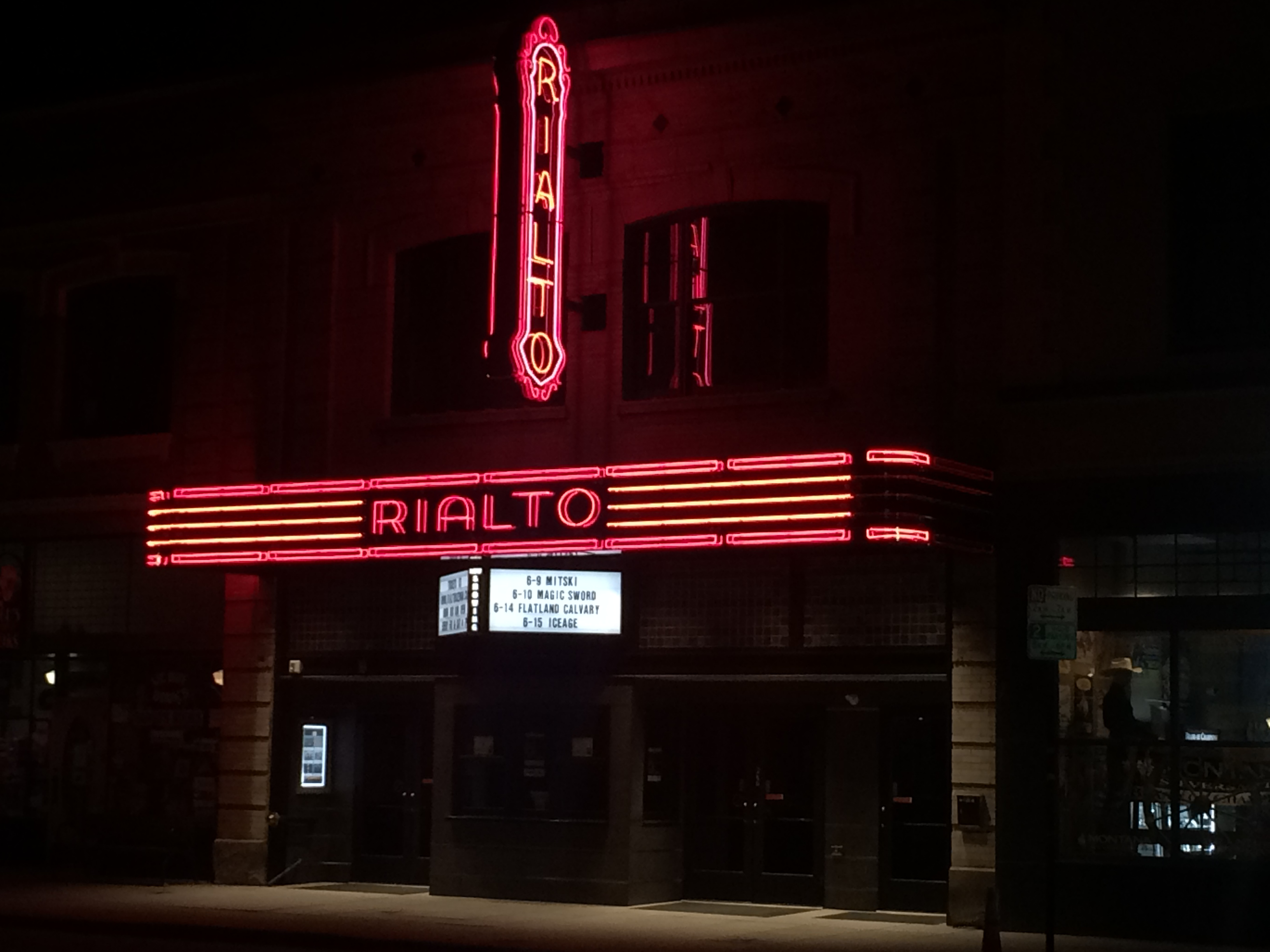
The Rialto

Museums and gardens:

- American Computer Museum
- Gallatin Historical Society-The Pioneer Museum
- Montana Arboretum and Gardens
- Museum of the Rockies
- Story Mansion

Libraries:

- Bozeman Public Library
- Renne Library, Montana State University

Other:

- BZN International Film Festival
- Gibson Guitar Factory
- Sweet Pea-A Festival of the Arts – Festival held annually since 1977. The Sweet Pea Carnival was first established in 1906.
- U.S. Fish and Wildlife Service Fish Technology Center, established 1892
- Last Best Comedy Club

== Recreation ==
The Bozeman area is noted for outdoor recreation, particularly skiing.

- East Gallatin Recreation Area
- Bridger Bowl Ski Area is located on the northeast face of the Bridger Mountains, utilizing state and federal land. Bridger Bowl was Bozeman's first ski area and opened to the public in 1955.
- Big Sky Ski Resort is reached via the Gallatin Canyon, 40 miles (64 km) south of Bozeman. The resort has grown considerably since 1973 into a residential community and major winter tourist destination.

== Government ==
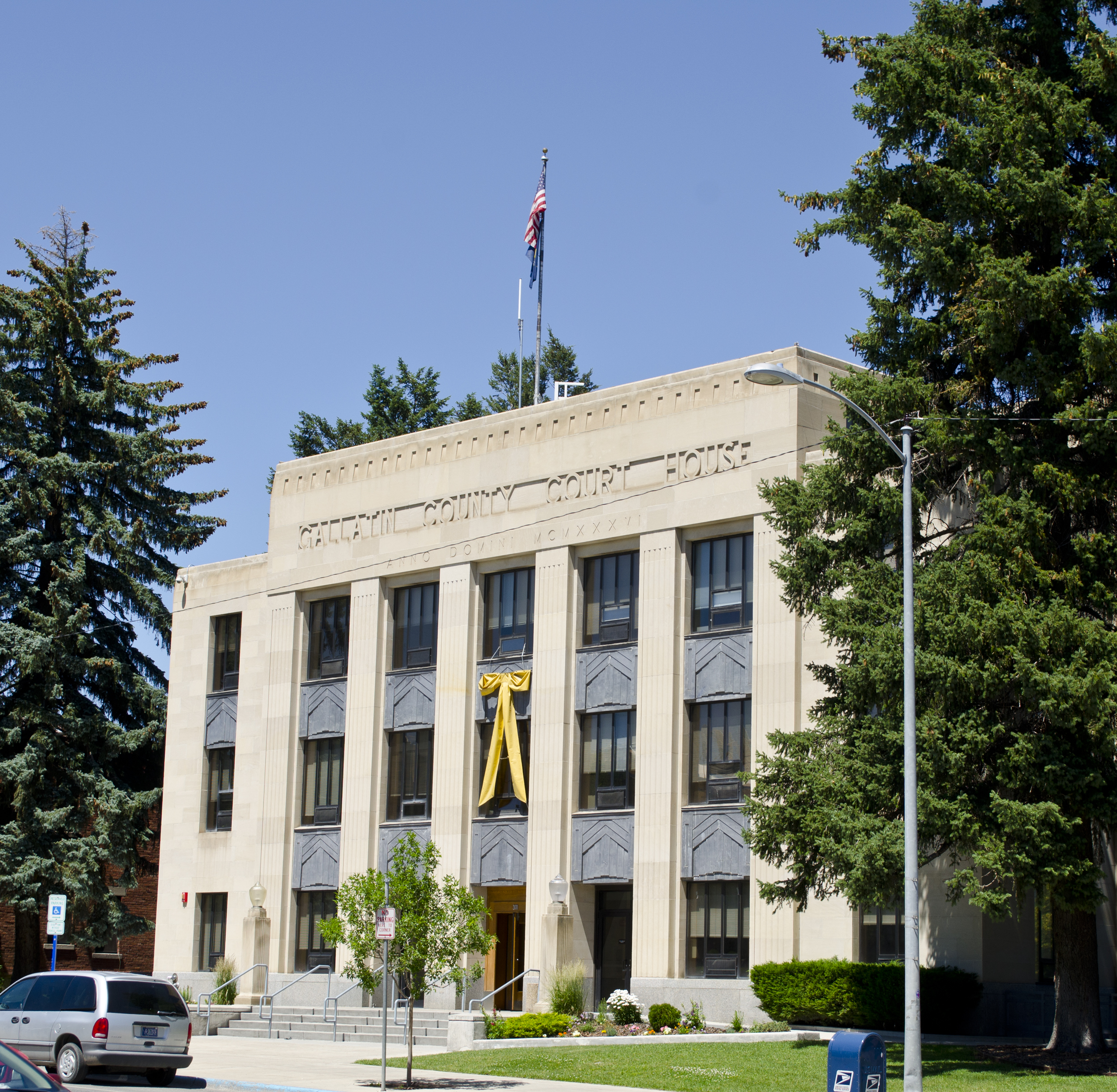
The Gallatin County Courthouse

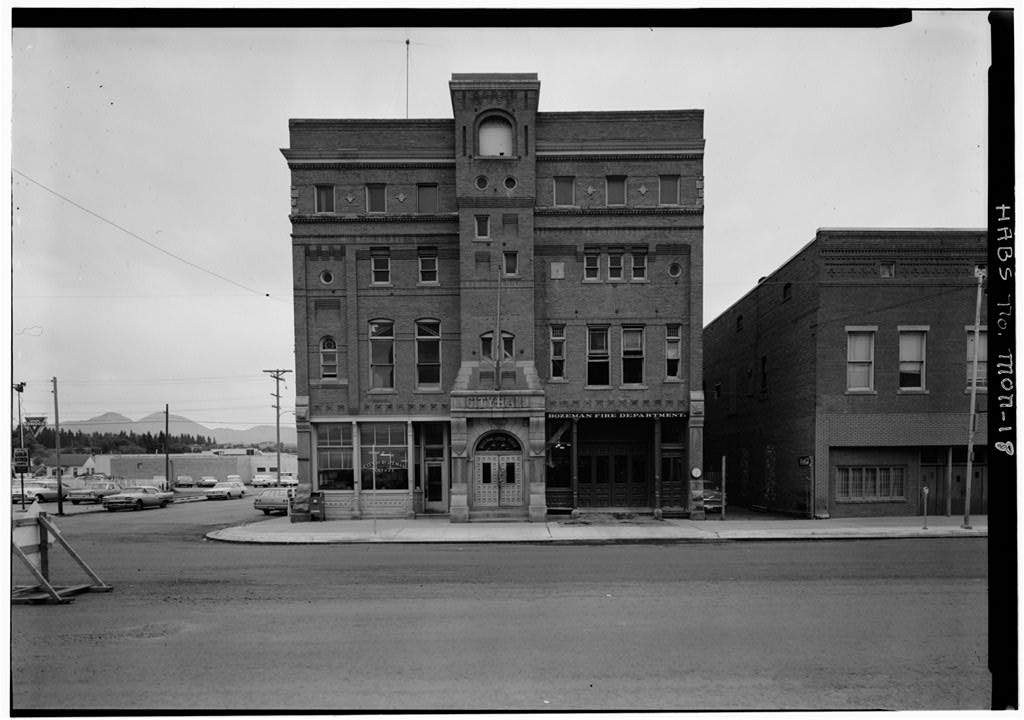
First City Hall (1965)

Bozeman became an incorporated Montana city in April 1883 and adopted a city council form of government. Currently, the City of Bozeman uses a city commission/city manager form of government, which the citizens adopted on January 1, 1922 with an elected municipal judge. The city commission is chaired by an elected mayor. These three entities form the legislative, executive, and judicial branches of government.

Each city election, the voters select a mayor at large. The elected mayors serve as deputy mayor for the first two years of their terms, then mayor for the balance of their terms. The City Commission appoints members to various citizen advisory boards that advise the City Commission on matters including development, zoning, parking, parks, transportation, and forestry. The city charter also establishes an Inter-Neighborhood Council, composed of representatives selected by each of the city's recognized neighborhood associations.

== Education ==
=== Public ===
Bozeman Public Schools has two components: Bozeman Elementary School District and Bozeman High School District. Belgrade Public Schools has two components: Belgrade Elementary School District and Belgrade High School District. Almost all of Bozeman is in Bozeman Elementary School District and Bozeman High School District. A small piece extends into Belgrade Elementary School District and Belgrade High School District.

- The Bozeman Public School District operates two high schools – Bozeman High School and Gallatin High School; two middle schools – Chief Joseph Middle School and Sacajawea Middle School; and eight elementary schools – Emily Dickinson Elementary School, Hawthorne Elementary School, Hyalite Elementary School, Irving Elementary School, Longfellow Elementary School, Meadowlark Elementary School, Morning Star Elementary School, and Whittier Elementary School.
- The district also operates the Bridger Alternative Program as a branch campus of Bozeman High School to serve "at-risk" secondary students.
- The former Emerson Elementary School is now a cultural community center. Willson School, originally a high school, then a middle school, then the base for an alternative high school, is still owned by the school district and houses a number of school district offices.

=== Private ===
- Headwaters Academy, located on Durston Rd, is a co-educational middle school (grades 6 through 8).
- Petra Academy is a co-educational school (prekindergarten through grade 12) affiliated with Protestant teachings.
- Heritage Christian School located off Durston Rd is a co-educational school (prekindergarten through grade 12).

=== Post-secondary ===
- Bozeman is home to Montana State University, the state's largest university and the flagship campus of the Montana State University System. It set a new fall enrollment record in the fall of 2024, at a total of 17,144 students on campus.

== Media ==
=== Newspapers and magazines ===
- Bozeman Avant Courier – published 1871–1905
- The Republican-Courier – published 1905–1913
- The Bozeman Courier – published 1919–1954
- Bozeman Daily Chronicle

=== AM radio ===
- KBOZ 1090, Talk/personality, Reier Broadcasting Company
- KOBB 1230, Sports talk, Reier Broadcasting Company
- KPRK AM 1340, News/talk, Townsquare Media
- KMMS 1450, News/talk, Townsquare Media
- KYWL AM 1490, Active Rock

=== FM radio ===
- KGLT 91.9, Variety, Montana State University
- KMMS-FM 94.7, Adult album, Townsquare Media
- KISN 96.7, Top 40 contemporary hit radio, Townsquare Media
- KXLB 100.7, Country music, Townsquare Media
- KBMC (FM) 102.1, Variety, Montana State University-Billings
- KZMY 103.5, Hot adult contemporary, Townsquare Media
- KBZM 104.7, Classic rock, Orion Media LLC
- KKQX 105.7, Classic rock, Orion Media LLC
- KSCY 106.9, Country music, Orion Media LLC
- KOZB 97.5, Active rock, Desert Mountain Broadcasting Company
- KBOZ-FM 99.9, Soft oldie, Desert Mountain Broadcasting Company
- KOBB-FM 93.7, Classic hits, Desert Mountain Broadcasting Company

=== Television ===
- KDBZ-CD 6 NBC, Sinclair Broadcast Group
- KBZK 7 CBS, E. W. Scripps Company
- KUSM 9 PBS, Montana State University
- KWYB-LD 28-1 ABC, Cowles Company (LP relay from Butte)
- KWYB-LD 28-2 FOX

=== Filming location ===
Movies filmed in Bozeman include:

- The Wildest Dream
- A River Runs Through It
- A Plumm Summer
- Amazing Grace and Chuck

== Infrastructure ==
=== Transportation ===
Highways include:

- Interstate 90
- U.S. Highway 191
- Montana Highway 86
- Montana Highway 84

Freight rail service is provided by Montana Rail Link, a privately held Class II railroad that connects Spokane, Washington, with Huntley, Montana. The city was last served by passenger rail in 1979 by the North Coast Hiawatha at Bozeman Depot.

Public transportation is provided by Streamline, a zero-fare public bus system. It was operated by the local nonprofit Human Resource Development Council from its inception in 2006 until July 1, 2025, when operations were taken over by the newly created Gallatin Valley Urban Transportation District.

The Skyline bus service, operated by the Gallatin County Big Sky Transportation District, provides service between Bozeman and Big Sky.

Intercity bus service to the city is provided by Jefferson Lines.

Bozeman Yellowstone International Airport serves travelers to Bozeman, Big Sky, West Yellowstone, and Yellowstone National Park.

=== Fire department ===
The Bozeman Fire Department is a full-time career fire department. Currently, 47 uniformed firefighters are at three stations, with four engines (one reserve), a ladder truck, a battalion chief's truck, two brush trucks, a hazardous material unit, and two medic units. The Bozeman Fire Department responded to approximately 5,000 emergency calls in 2020.

== Notable people ==
The following individuals are either notable current or former residents of Bozeman (R), were born or raised in Bozeman in their early years (B), or otherwise have a significant connection to the history of the Bozeman area (C).

Sports personalities:

- Conrad Anker, mountaineer C
- Brock Coyle, National Football League (NFL) linebacker for the San Francisco 49ers and Seattle Seahawks B
- Will Dissly, NFL tight end for the Seattle Seahawks B
- Jeff Fisher, head coach for the NFL Tennessee Titans and Los Angeles Rams R
- Nikki Kimball, distance runner R
- Dane Fletcher, NFL linebacker for the New England Patriots and Tampa Bay Buccaneers B
- Alex Lowe, ice-climber and alpinist R
- Mike McLeod, former NFL] safety B
- Heather McPhie, freestyle skier, member of 2010 US Olympic team B
- Phil Olsen, former NFL lineman R
- Willie Saunders, Bozeman-born Canadian Horse Racing Hall of Fame jockey, won U.S. Triple Crown B
- Jan Stenerud, member of Pro Football Hall of Fame, AFL and NFL placekicker for the Kansas City Chiefs, Green Bay Packers, and Minnesota Vikings, winner of Super Bowl IV R
- Kevin Sweeney, former NFL quarterback for the Dallas Cowboys B
- Tejay van Garderen, professional cyclist R
- Nick Faldo, six-time golf major winner R

Military and pioneers:

- Travis Atkins, Medal of Honor recipient R
- John Bozeman, pioneer and founder of the Bozeman Trail C
- Henry Comstock, a discoverer of Comstock Lode died (suicide) in Bozeman on September 29, 1870 C
- Gustavus Cheyney Doane, member of Washburn-Langford-Doane Expedition 1870 and buried in Sunset Hills Cemetery, Bozeman

Arts, culture, and entertainment:

- Kris Atteberry, Major League Baseball (MLB_ broadcaster, one of only two Montanans to call an MLB game B
- Brannon Braga, writer and producer of Star Trek television shows and films B
- Deborah Butterfield, sculptor known for use of horses in artwork R
- Gary Cooper, film actor, attended Gallatin Valley High School in Bozeman R
- Glenn Close, American actress R
- Daniella Deutscher, actress B
- Pablo Elvira, opera singer R
- Landon Jones, journalist and author R
- Taylor Kitsch, actor
- Donna Kelley, former CNN anchor and current KBZK anchor R
- Jane Lawrence, actress and opera singer B
- Jason Lytle, lead singer of Modesto band, Grandaddy, solo artist R
- Julian MacKay, ballet dancer B
- Ben Mikaelsen, author R
- Christopher Parkening, guitarist, fly casting champion R
- David Quammen, long-time columnist for Outside and author R
- Steven Rinella, American outdoorsman, conservationist, writer, and television personality
- Albert, Alfred and Chris Schlechten multigeneration family of photographers noted for portraiture and images of Yellowstone National Park and the Gallatin Valley R, R, B
- James Willard Schultz, author and Glacier National Park explorer, lived in Bozeman 1928–1929 with partner Jessica McDonald, professor at Montana State,R Schultz's papers are archived at Montana State Burlingame Special Collections Library.
- Michael Spears, actor R
- Eddie Spears, actor R
- Julia Thorne, writer and ex-wife of 2004 Democratic Presidential candidate John Kerry R
- Kathy Tyers, writer, particularly known for contribution to Star Wars series R
- Peter Voulkos, ceramic artist B
- Sarah Vowell, author, regular on This American Life, voice actress from The Incredibles, B
- Dave Walker, musician R

Science and academia:

- Loren Acton, astronaut and physicist R
- Sidney M. Cadwell, discoverer of anti-oxidants for rubber, made first scientific study of rubber's fatigue behavior. B
- Don G. Despain, botanist, ecologist, and fire behavior specialist R
- Christopher Langan, scientist, was born in San Francisco, but grew up mostly in Bozeman
- Diana L. Eck, professor of comparative religion at Harvard University B
- Dr. James A. Henshall, first superintendent of Bozeman Fish Technology Center C
- Alice Haskins, government botanist and professor R
- Jack Horner, preeminent paleontologist upon whom main character, Dr. Alan Grant, in book and film Jurassic Park was patterned R
- Dale W. Jorgenson, Harvard University professor and economist B
- Robert M. Pirsig, author and past instructor of English and rhetoric at Montana State University R
- Ann Linnea Sandberg, immunologist R

Politics, government and business:

- Brooke D. Anderson, former ambassador to the United Nations
- Les AuCoin, former U.S. congressman from Oregon R
- John Bohlinger, lieutenant governor of Montana B
- Dorothy Bradley, former state legislator, congressional and gubernatorial candidate R
- Will Brooke, former chief of staff of Conrad Burns R
- Steve Daines, entrepreneur, business leader and Montana's current senior senator R
- Zales Ecton, former U.S. senator from Montana B
- Greg Gianforte, Governor of Montana, former US representative in Montana's at-large congressional district R
- Charles S. Hartman, U.S. congressman from Montana R
- Christopher Hedrick, entrepreneur and international development expert R
- Stan Jones, Libertarian Party candidate for Montana governor and U.S. senator R
- Vanessa Kerry, daughter of politician John Kerry R
- Michael McFaul, former U.S. ambassador to Russia R
- Scott Sales, former speaker of the Montana House of Representatives R
- Raymond Strother, Democratic political consultant R
- Sidney Runyan Thomas, judge of the United States Court of Appeals for the Ninth Circuit B
- Ted Turner, entrepreneur (Ted's Montana Grill) and founder of cable television empires including CNN and TBS R
- Ryan Zinke, U.S. representative for Montana B

Other:

- Greg Mortenson, humanitarian and founder of the Central Asia Institute R
- Elizabeth Clare Prophet, co-founder of Church Universal and Triumphant R
- Fred F. Willson, designed many notable buildings in Bozeman between 1902 and 1956. R

== In popular culture ==
In the film Star Trek: First Contact, Bozeman was the launch site of the first warp-capable spacecraft and location of first contact with the Vulcans on April 5, 2063. The animated series Star Trek: Lower Decks features "Historic Bozeman" in episode one of season three, revisiting some plot points from First Contact.

The members of the noise rock group Steel Pole Bath Tub are originally from Bozeman.

The Bozeman area is one of the settings in Robert Pirsig's novel Zen and the Art of Motorcycle Maintenance.

== See also ==
- Bozeman Pass
