= Cooper Park Historic District =

Historic district in Montana, United States

- U.S. National Register of Historic Places
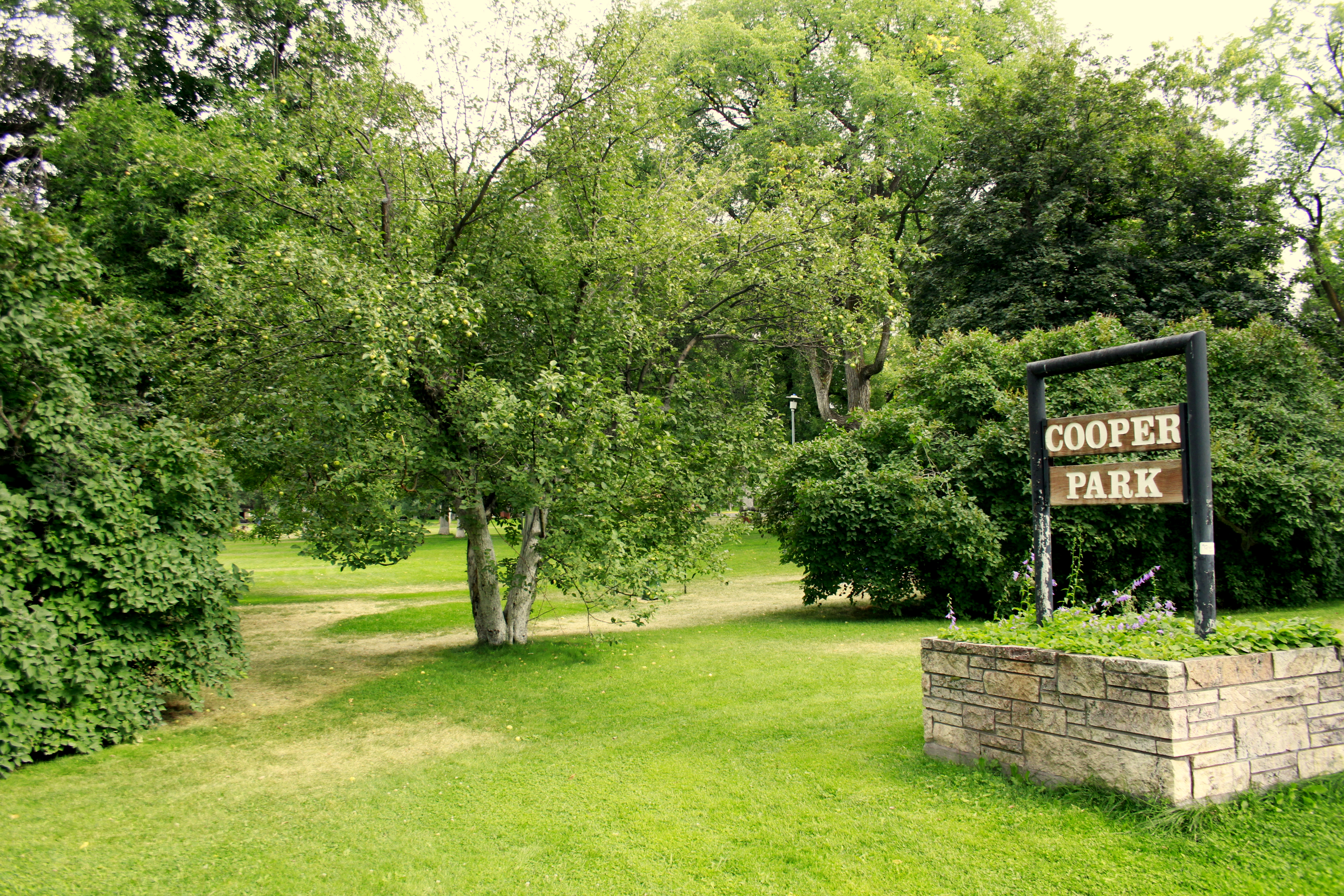

- Location within Montana Location within the United States
- Location: 200-700 blocks of S. Fifth, Sixth, Seventh, Eighth, & Cross Sts., Bozeman, Montana
- Coordinates: 45°40′31″N 111°02′40″W
- Area: 75 acres (30 ha)
- Built by: Elmer L. Bartholomew, others
- Architectural style: Colonial Revival, Bungalow/craftsman, Queen Anne
- MPS: Bozeman MRA
- NRHP reference No.: 87001845
- Added to NRHP: October 23, 1987

The Cooper Park Historic District, in Bozeman, Montana, is a 75 acres (30 ha) historic district which was listed on the National Register of Historic Places in 1987.

It includes Cooper Park, a two-block square that anchors the district, and the 200 to 700 blocks of S. Fifth, Sixth, Seventh, Eighth, & Cross Sts. in Bozeman, and includes 222 contributing buildings out of a total of 265 one- and two-story houses in the district.

It includes Colonial Revival, Bungalow/craftsman, and Queen Anne architecture.

There are several small clusters or pairs of houses clearly built by one hand, including four similar Bungalow-style houses at 507, 511, 515, and 523 W. Babcock, all probably built by carpenter Elmer Bartholomew around 1920, and 718 and 722 S. 7th Avenue, built by carpenter Ora E. Long.
