= Eagle Mount =

Eagle Mount Organization

Eagle Mount is a 501(c)(3) non-profit organization that facilitates and implements therapeutic recreational programs and opportunities for people with disabilities, children with cancer, and provides support for their families. The organization was founded in Bozeman, Montana, and additional independent Eagle Mount organizations currently exist in Billings, Montana, and Great Falls, Montana. The information in this article refers to Eagle Mount Bozeman.

== History ==
The I Am Third Foundation (based on Matthew 22) and Eagle Mount were founded in 1982 by General Robert C. Mathis and his wife, Greta, retired from a 34-year career in the Air Force. According to the Bozeman Daily Chronicle, “The couple created more than a program for people with disabilities. They created kinship between anyone who deigns to get involved".

They started in the fall of 1983 with the Eagle Mount ski program at the Bridger Bowl ski hill. The following summer, they added horseback riding at a local ranch. The next programs to be added were swimming and the Big Sky Kids camps for children with cancer.

Eagle Mount Bozeman's campus is currently 40 acres and includes administrative offices; adaptive horsemanship facilities which include the Storey Mills Horsemanship Education Center, the Murdoch’s indoor riding arena, barn and horse paddocks; the Tim and Mary Barnard Aquatics Center; a performing arts outdoor amphitheater, program gardens, a fully accessible playground, and play and reflective spaces.

== Programs Offered ==
Eagle Mount started with skiing in 1983. Other programs include adaptive horsemanship, aquatic therapy and adaptive swimming, Big Sky Kids oncology camps, horticultural therapy, the EMBLEM program for veterans, and parent support programs.

Eagle Mount does alpine skiing and snowboarding at Bridger Bowl and Big Sky Resort, and Nordic skiing and snowshoeing at Crosscut Mountain Sports Center. Other programs are hosted on Eagle Mount's 40-acre campus in south Bozeman.

== Number of Participants ==
The number of participants has increased from 100 in 1982 to 1,783 in 2014. Almost 2,000 volunteers assisted the participants in 2014.

== Fundraising ==
Eagle Mount is a private non-profit organization which does not take government funding, instead relying on private donors, grants, and foundations. In-kind donations such as program equipment, ski passes and rental services, horses and hay, and more also facilitate the variety of programs. Support has come from The M.J. Murdock Charitable Trust and the Dennis and Phyllis Washington Foundation. Three annual events are held in support of Eagle Mount Bozeman's programs including the Western Rendezvous, a barn dance and auction fundraiser; the Crystal Ball, a black-tie event; and Digger Days, a collaboration with local construction companies to let people of all ages drive heavy equipment with the support of professional operators.
