= Bozeman High School =

Public school in Montana, United States

Location
- 205 North 11th Avenue; Bozeman, Montana 59715; United States; 45°40′48″N 111°03′11″W

Information
- Type: Public
- Established: 1877, 149 years ago
- School district: Bozeman School District
- Principal: Dan Mills
- Staff: 136.70 (FTE)
- Grades: 9–12
- Enrollment: 1,263 (2023-2024)
- Student to teacher ratio: 16.12
- Colors: Black and red
- Mascot: Hawks
- Website: bhs.bsd7.org

Bozeman High School (or BHS) is a public high school for grades 9 through 12 located in Bozeman, Montana. It is the second-oldest high school in the state of Montana. In 2024, it had an enrollment of roughly 1,263 students, and was accredited by the Northwest Accreditation Commission. Before 2020, when Gallatin High School opened, enrollment was roughly 1,800 per year.

== History ==
Bozeman established its high school 149 years ago in 1877, housing it (along with other grades) in the newly built West Side School at 300 West Babcock. Students were few, and due to dropouts, the high school did not graduate its first class until 1882. In 1937, a new county high school building, Gallatin County High School, was constructed at 404 West Main Street.

Later renamed the Willson School (after its architect, Fred Willson), GCHS was closed in 1956 when the city of Bozeman constructed a new city high school, a mile west at 205 North 11th Avenue, designed by both Willson and Oswald Berg. This building serves as the current Bozeman High School, while the 1937 building was used to house Bridger Alternative High School until 2009. Bridger Alternative now resides in the second story of the new "D Wing" of the school. Also housed in the same building until 2009 was Chief Joseph Middle School, which now has its own building in north Bozeman. The portion of the building previously used for the old middle school was remodeled slightly with a new cafeteria and main offices and library, now called north campus, or "N Wing" to students. The majority of classes today are located in "N Wing", as "B Wing", the previous largest wing, was torn-down in 2021.

== Curriculum and awards ==
In 2002, BHS employed four administrators and 129 teachers and support staff. Most of the teaching faculty have master's degrees.

Bozeman High School offers two diplomas: the General Diploma and the Honors Diploma. More than half of the students in 2002 graduated with the College Prep Diploma. BHS offers courses in art, biomedical sciences, business education, engineering, English, foreign languages, health enhancement (health education and physical education), home economics, industrial arts, mathematics, music, science, and social studies. It also offers Advanced Placement courses in American history, art, biology, calculus, chemistry, English literature and composition, European history, French, German, human geography, government, microeconomics, music theory, physics, psychology, Spanish, statistics, and world history. In the early 2000s, Bozeman High School students scored consistently higher on the SAT than other students in Montana and nationally.

In 1989 and again in 1993, Bozeman High School was named a Blue Ribbon School of Excellence by the United States Department of Education. In 1994 and 1996 Redbook magazine named Bozeman High School one of the best high schools in the nation.

U.S. News & World Report ranks Bozeman High School 213 on its 2024 Best High Schools ranking. In 2010, Newsweek Magazine included Bozeman High School in its annual list of America's Best High Schools for the fifth time since 2003. The magazine ranked BHS 675 on its list of 1,600 top schools, placing it in the top 3% of high schools in the nation.

== Campus and athletics ==
The 54-acre (22 ha) campus includes a 50-meter (160 ft) swimming pool that, by a lease arrangement from the city, provides swimming opportunities for students. The campus has a 10-lane all-weather running track for use in the health enhancement curriculum as well as in extracurricular activities. The campus is also home to a football stadium used by both high schools in Bozeman, Van Winkle Stadium. The school's mascot is the hawk.

== Athletics ==
Athletic programs include Cross country, track, softball, cheerleading, football, basketball, volleyball, swimming, wrestling, soccer, and dance. The Hawks are in division AA, the largest division in Montana.

== Notable alumni ==
- Brock Coyle, linebacker; Seattle Seahawks, San Francisco 49ers
- Steve Daines, US Senator
- Will Dissly, Los Angeles Chargers(formerly Seattle Seahawks) tight end
- Jason R. Dunn, US Attorney for the District of Colorado (2018-2021)
- Dane Fletcher, former New England Patriots Tampa Bay Buccaneers linebacker
- Jesse Kelly, radio talk show host
- Karen Gibson, Former US Senate's Sergeant at Arms
- Sherry Matteucci, former US Attorney for Montana (class of 1965)
- Michael McFaul, former US Ambassador to Russia
- Stephanie Quayle, musician

== Bibliography ==
- Burlingame, Merrill G. The Montana Frontier. Bozeman, Mont.: Big Sky Books, 1980.
- Mulvaney, Tom. Bozeman and the Gallatin Valley. Charleston, S.C.: Arcadia Publishing, 2009.
- Smith, Phyllis. Bozeman and the Gallatin Valley: A History. Helena, Mont.: Falcon Press, 1996.
