= Montana Arboretum and Gardens =

Arboretum in Bozeman, Montana, United States

Coordinates: 45°40′06″N 111°03′00″W

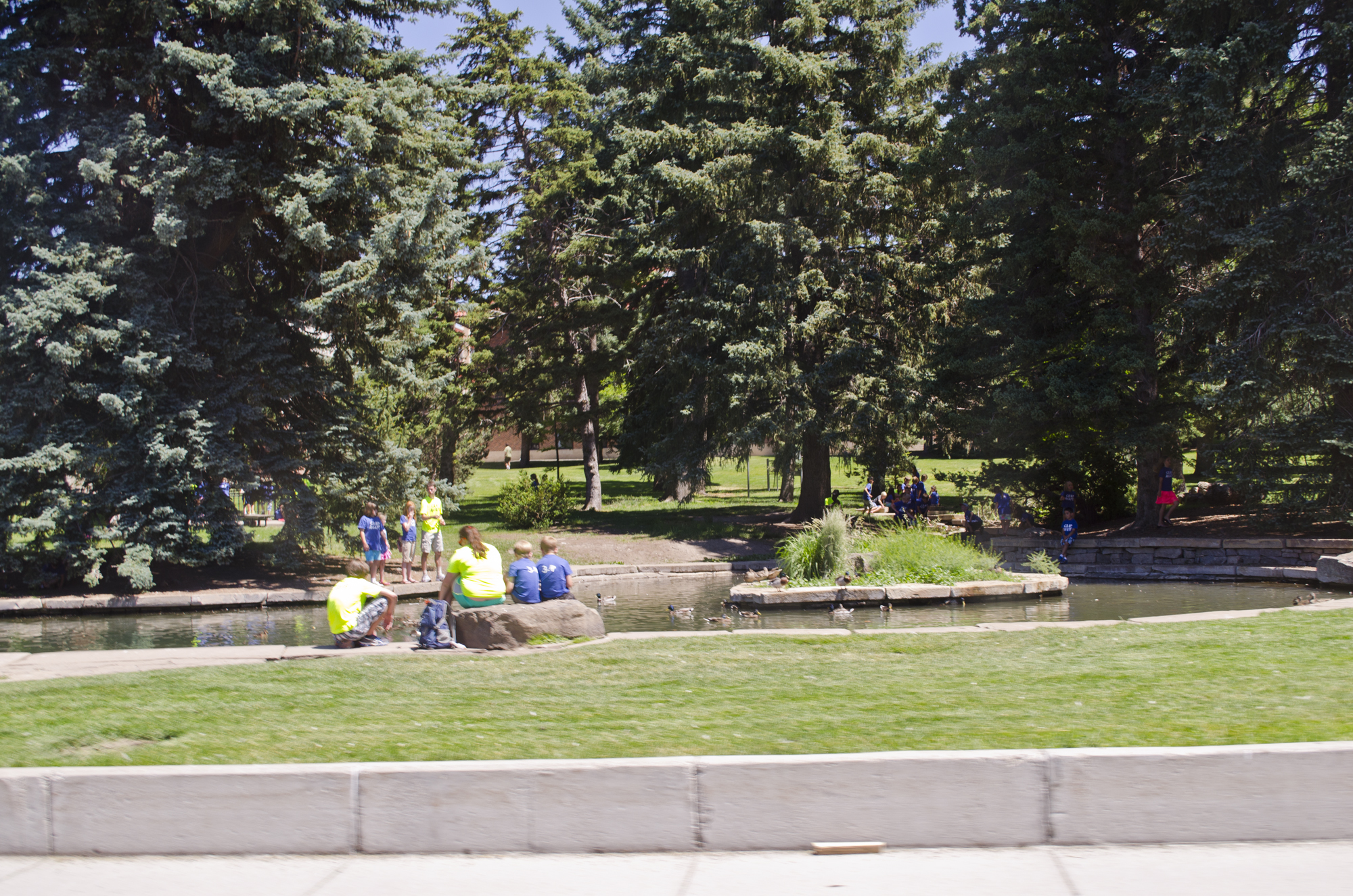
- Interactive map of Montana Arboretum and Gardens

The Montana Arboretum and Gardens are located on the Montana State University campus in Bozeman, Montana. The Arboretum proper is located at the northwestern corner of campus by the intersection of West College Avenue and South 11th Avenue, but plantings occur throughout campus.

The small arboretum features native plants from the north Rocky Mountain region, the plains, and drier areas of Montana. It includes a Xeriscape garden and many established large specimens.

== Plants ==
Plants in the arboretum proper include: Acer rubrum, Amelanchier alnifolia, Arctostaphylos uva-ursi, Caragana arboresens, Caragana frutex, Cercocarpus ledifolius, Fraxinus pennsylvanica, Juniperus chinensis, Juniperus communis, Lonicera tartarica, Lonicera x brownii, Malus spp., Pentaphylloides floribunda, Pinus ponderosa, Populus tremula, Rosa rugosa, Sorbus x hybrida, Syringa meyeri, Syringa vulgaris.

== See also ==
- List of botanical gardens in the United States
