= Inter-Neighborhood Council (Bozeman, Montana) =

Advisory body of neighborhood associations in Bozeman, Montana

- Abbreviation: INC
- Formation: January 1, 2008; 18 years ago
- Type: Municipal advisory body
- Purpose: Neighborhood representation and advisory input to city government
- Headquarters: Bozeman City Hall
- Location: Bozeman, Montana, United States
- Members: Representatives of 15 recognized neighborhood associations
- Official language: English
- Parent organization: City of Bozeman

The Inter-Neighborhood Council (INC) of Bozeman, Montana (as styled in the municipal charter) is a citizen advisory body in Bozeman, Montana, United States. It is composed of representatives selected by each of the city's officially recognized neighborhood associations, and provides a forum in which those associations share information and make recommendations to the Bozeman City Commission, city staff, and the mayor on citywide issues.

Unlike most municipal advisory committees, the council is established directly by the city charter rather than by ordinance alone. Section 4.06 of the Bozeman charter, approved by voters on November 7, 2006 and effective January 1, 2008, provides that "[t]here is hereby established an Inter-Neighborhood Council to be composed of representatives selected by each recognized neighborhood association." As of 2026 the council represents 15 active neighborhood associations; two additional associations are recognized but inactive.

== History ==
=== Establishment ===
The council originated in the work of Bozeman's 2004–2006 Local Government Study Commission, which drafted a new city charter for a commission–manager government. Voters approved the charter at the general election of November 7, 2006. Most of its provisions, including Section 4.06 on neighborhood associations, took effect on January 1, 2008.

Section 4.06 states that "[t]he citizens of Bozeman value the contribution neighborhoods can make to the governance of the city," and directs the City Commission to establish by ordinance minimum recognition requirements for neighborhood associations. Those requirements include clear geographic boundaries, bylaws providing for democratic deliberation and voting, periodic meetings including an annual meeting, inclusion of all residents within the association's boundaries, and a means of communicating with them. Only associations meeting and maintaining these standards are eligible to elect members to the council.

The City of Bozeman created its Neighborhoods Program in 2007 to support the new structure, with stated goals of enhancing communication between residents and the city, fostering cooperation among differing interests, expanding public participation in city processes, and recognizing residents' stewardship of their neighborhoods. The council adopted its first set of bylaws in December 2007, shortly before the charter provision took effect.

=== Growth ===
The number of recognized neighborhood associations grew incrementally rather than being established all at once. The Bozeman Daily Chronicle reported in August 2008 that residents near Bogert Park were organizing what would become the city's eighth neighborhood association.

By March 2018 the council represented 14 associations, seven of which had formed within the preceding two years. The Chronicle reported at that time that the associations covered about 22 percent of the city's residential area and roughly one-third of Bozeman residents. Council coordinator Tanya Andreasen said of the remaining coverage, "there's a lot of room to grow."

Meeting records held in the city's public records system show that the council's regular meeting schedule was interrupted in March 2020 during the COVID-19 pandemic and did not return to its previous near-monthly cadence for several years.

== Structure and function ==
The council is composed of representatives selected by each recognized neighborhood association; some associations designate more than one representative. Vacancies may be filled only by the affected neighborhood association, and the city may appoint a city commissioner as a non-voting member. The council adopts bylaws governing the conduct of its business, which are subject to approval by the City Commission or as designated by ordinance. The charter further requires the city to designate a staff member as liaison to the council and to the neighborhood associations.

The council is advisory and holds no independent regulatory or budgetary authority. The charter specifies that its existence "does not preclude a neighborhood association from taking its concerns directly to the city or the commission."

As of 2026 the council generally meets on the second Thursday of each month.

The city distinguishes neighborhood associations, which are open to all residents and businesses within a defined boundary, from homeowners' associations, whose membership is limited to property owners.

=== Member neighborhood associations ===
As of September 2026 the council represented the following 15 active neighborhood associations:

- Bogert Park Neighborhood Association
- Bozeman Creek Neighborhood Association
- Bridger Creeklands Association of Neighbors
- Cooper Park Neighborhood Association
- Figgins Addition Neighborhood Association
- Jandt Neighborhood Association
- Kirk Park Neighborhood Association
- Marwyn-Lindley Neighborhood Association
- Midtown Neighborhood Association
- New Hyalite View Neighborhood Association
- Northeast Neighborhood Association
- South Central Association of Neighbors
- University Neighborhood Association
- Valley Unit Neighborhood Association
- Valley West and The Lakes Neighborhood Association

Two further associations, Flanders Creek and South East, are recognized by the city but listed as inactive.

== Activities ==
=== Land use and development ===
Much of the council's documented activity concerns land use. In September 2012 it convened a meeting to address potential impacts of increased rail traffic through the city. In January 2017 it transmitted detailed recommendations to the mayor, City Commission, and Community Development staff on accessory dwelling unit regulations as part of a rewrite of the city's Unified Development Code, addressing lot-size thresholds, building size and height, solar access, occupancy, and short-term rental use.

In June 2024 the council held a special meeting at which residents of the Midtown neighborhood presented concerns about The Guthrie, a proposed five-story, 111-unit apartment building at North Fifth Avenue and Villard Street, roughly half of whose units were to be affordable to households earning below 80 percent of area median income. Residents objected in particular to the absence of a minimum parking requirement. The council deferred a vote so that representatives could consult their associations before reconvening the following week. The episode drew attention to the council's role as a venue for organized neighborhood response to individual development proposals.

== 2026 charter review ==
Under Montana law, local governments periodically convene study commissions to review their form of government. Bozeman's 2024–2026 Local Government Study Commission placed a set of proposed charter amendments before voters at the November 3, 2026 election. Neighborhood representation was among the subjects the study commission considered. Working materials prepared for an April 24, 2026 meeting set out proposed revisions to Section 4.06 intended to strengthen its effect, including language requiring timely City Commission responses to council recommendations and consultation with neighborhoods "during formative stages of citywide planning efforts, major policy initiatives, and budget priority discussions." Study commissioner Jan Strout said the commission had found "strong interest in advisory boards and committees that speak for neighborhoods or specific issues" and sought to make such bodies "as representative of the community as possible."

== See also ==
- Neighborhood association
- Bozeman, Montana
