= Glen Lake Rotary Park =

Park in Montana, United States

Coordinates: 45°42′20″N 111°02′06″W

Glen Lake Rotary Park, formerly the East Gallatin Recreation Area, is an 83-acre recreation area in Bozeman, Montana, United States. The lake was originally a water filled old gravel pit.

The conversion of the gravel pit and adjacent old city landfill into a recreation area was awarded a national Take Pride in America award.

== History ==
The Glen Lake Rotary Park (originally called East Gallatin Recreation Area) began as a gravel pit and the city dump. Early photos show a steep sided water filled pit, surrounded by weeds and adjacent to an old city junk yard and landfill, with refrigerators with doors removed and car parts poking out of the ground. The land was sold to the state parks department by Glen Hash and partners, whose business owned the gravel pit and some adjacent land. Shortly after the land became owned as park land, Mr. Glen Hash died in an accident. This eventually led to the current name of Glen Lake.

The cleanup around the water filled gravel pit, now called a lake, was accomplished in partnership with the City through local donations and volunteer labor. Early volunteer work was performed by local people and businesses under the leadership of the volunteer group organized as the "East Gallatin Recreation Area Task Force" which received a national award at the White House.

The renovation of the landfill was accomplished by a combination of local government (City and Soil Conservation Service) and donations from others. Now it is a large walking trail through tall grass.

After about ten years, the newly formed Bozeman Sunrise Rotary Club took over the volunteer leadership.

In late December 2018, the Montana Fish, Wildlife and Parks Department gave a 50 year lease agreement for the park to the City of Bozeman, which also owns the larger grassland and river bottom park area to the east. Under the terms of that agreement, the name of the area was changed to "Glen Lake Rotary Park" in honor of all the work done by the Rotary Club.

Starting in about 2018, detailed plans were made to improve the roads and parking and create an additional entrance on the south side. As of August 2023 this progress still exists only on paper, but the first 1/3 might be created by the end of 2023. Rising costs and available cash are the main impediments. However, a new paved road to the South border of the Park has been constructed, mostly due to the Park neighbor Northwestern Energy. The Bozeman Sunrise Rotary Club contributed approximately $125,000 of the projected $441,000 cost for the first third of the project, which was completed in the summer of 2024

Starting in late 2022 and continuing through 2025, the Bozeman Sunrise Rotary Club, with help from a nearby land owner and others, has converted an old 2 acre horse pasture with a small ditch into a landscaped park area containing a meandering stream.

The City of Bozeman provides the maintenance and legal administration of the Park, while the Bozeman Sunrise Rotary Club continues an almost 30 year process of adding improvements.

Donations for more improvements can be made by contacting the Bozeman Sunrise Rotary Club which has created an IRS 501c3 foundation that can provide receipts which qualify for tax deductions.
