= Book of the Black Bass =

1881 book on fishing

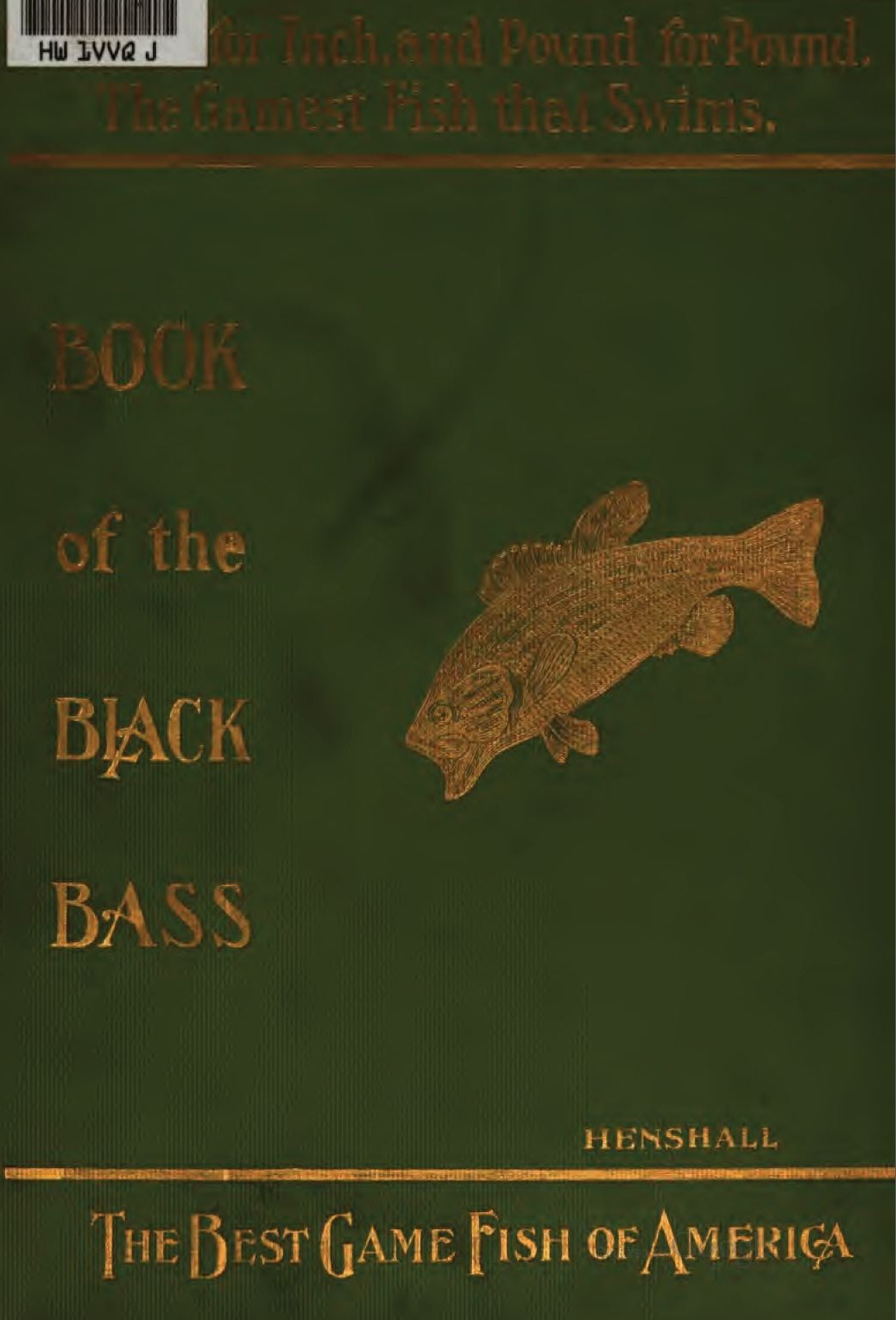
- Cover, 1904 2nd edition
- Author: James A. Henshall, M.D.
- Language: English
- Subject: Black Bass, Bass fishing, Fly fishing
- Publisher: Robert Clarke & Co., Cincinnati
- Publication date: 1881
- Publication place: United States
- Pages: 463
- Followed by: More About the Black Bass (1889)

Book of the Black Bass - Comprising Its Complete and Scientific and Life History with a Practical Treatise On Angling and Fly Fishing and a Full Description of Tools, Tackle and Implements is a work of angling and fly fishing literature on the subject of Black Bass written by James A. Henshall, M.D., a mid-western medical doctor and first published in Cincinnati in 1881 by Robert Clarke & Co.

== Synopsis ==
Henshall's Book of Black Bass is really three books in one. There are nearly 180 pages devoted to the biology of the Black Basses known at the time. A slightly lesser number of pages in Part Second are focused on the fishing tackle necessary for successful Black Bass fishing. Henshall himself was a leading reel collector when his book was published and his chapters on fishing reels and their development are often quoted and valued by tackle collectors today. The Part Third as Henshall named it is focused on the various fishing techniques to be used in Black Bass fishing to include fly fishing.

Henshall published a companion book entitled More About the Black Bass is 1889 and in 1904 published Book of the Black Bass in a revised 2nd edition that included much of the writings in More About the Black Bass.

In the 1881 Preface, Henshall introduces the book thus:

This book owes its origin to a long-cherished desire on the part of the author, to give to the Black Bass its proper place among game fishes, and to create among anglers, and the public generally, an interest in a fish that has never been so fully appreciated as its merits deserve, because of the want of suitable tackle for its capture, on the one hand, and a lack of information regarding its habits and economic value on the other.

The Book of the Black Bass is of an entirely practical nature, both as regards its subject-matter and its illustrations. It has been written more with a view to instruct, than to amuse or entertain the reader; he will, therefore, look in vain, between its covers, for those rhetorical flights, poetic descriptions or entertaining accounts and pleasing illustrations of the pleasures and vicissitudes of angling, which are usually found in works of this character. Nor is it to be regarded, on the other hand, as a book of a purely scientific nature—far from it—for the author has written as an angler rather than as a naturalist. With these apologies, I trust the reader will not be disappointed in its perusal.

== Reviews ==
- In his book My Angling Friends, Fred Mather, editor of Field and Stream, devoted a whole chapter to Henshall and said this about his book:

But his book, "The Book of the Black Bass," will be all the monument and "obituary" that any man might crave. It is the most distinctively American of any fishing book ever published. It deals with a grand pair of American game fishes which had received scant attention from angling authors; not more than had been accorded to the perch and similar fish until Henshall made the declaration that: "Pound for pound, the black bass is the gamiest fish that swims." Then Americans began to regard these fishes in a new light and Henshall was dubbed "the apostle of the black bass."

- The 1904 revised 2nd Edition received this review from The New York Times:

James A. Henshall's name will always be associated with the Black Bass. Not alone is the sportsman indebted to him, but the ichthyologist as well for the knowledge of this fish. ... In a masterly manner the author gives the fullest instruction concerning tools, tackle and implements to be used in black bass fishing, and at the conclusion there is to be read a chapter on fly fishing in its broadest sense.

The last word the author has to say is: "Always kill your fish as soon as taken from the water, and ever be satisfied with a moderate creel." In the volume there are to be read the names of many men of science and fisherman, American born, whose memories we cherish.

- Robert Page Lincoln, a noted bass fisherman and angling author of the mid-20th century wrote in his Black Bass Fishing (1952):

Once upon a time in this country there lived an eminent fish culturist, angling authority and traveler. His name was James Alexander Henshall... Henshall was a bass fisherman all his life. Henshall fished the length and breadth of the black bass range in this country and wrote a famous treatise, Book of the Black Bass. He is indeed, the father of bass fishing in this country.

- Ted Kesting, once the editor of Sports Afield compiled Bass Fishing (1962) and introduced Henshall in a chapter entitled 200 Years of Bass Fishing.

And Dr. Henshall wrote a volume in 1881 quite simply entitled Book of the Black Bass which practically clubbed the angling world into accepting bass as one of the world's great sporting fishes. "Inch for inch, pound for pound, the gamest fish that swims," the doctor said in his now-famous dictum. This was the statement that made bass socially acceptable, which they had not been before.

- In American Fly Fishing - A History (1996), Paul Schullery said this about Henshall:

Henshall's writings, especially his Book of the Black Bass (1881), were the best, most comprehensive and scientifically authoritative works on bass for more than sixty years (and how often can that be said of a popular fishing book?), and he championed a good cause, alerting thousands of fly fishers to the sporting possibilities of the basses just as those fish were finding homes in new waters in many parts of the country.

- Will Ryan, author of Smallmouth Strategies for the Fly Rod (1996) wrote about Henshall:

What distinguished Henshall's prose, however was less the technical subject matter than his enthusiasm for the sporting quality of the black bass. "Inch for inch and pound for pound, the gamest fish that swims" does not exactly stand as an equivocal statement, even given the rhetorical nature of magazine writing in the latter part of the nineteenth century. It may be the most quoted line in American sportfishing. And with it, Henshall ensured his place in fishing history as the father of black bass fishing.

== Other editions ==
From Antiquarian Book Exchange

- Henshall, James A. M.D. (1889). Book of the Black Bass (1st edition, 2nd printing ed.). Cincinnati, OH: Robert Clarke & Co.
- Henshall, James A. M.D. (1904). Book of the Black Bass (2nd edition revised ed.). Cincinnati, OH: Stewart & Kidd Co.
- Henshall, James A. M.D. (1978). Book of the Black Bass (1st edition facsimile ed.). Cleveland, OH: Bass Anglers Sportsman Society.
- Henshall, James A. M.D. (1987). Book of the Black Bass (1st edition facsimile ed.). Cleveland, OH: Bass Anglers Sportsman Society.
- Henshall, James A. M.D. (2006). Book of the Black Bass (1st edition facsimile ed.). Whitefish, MT: Kessinger Publishing. ISBN 978-1-4286-2595-2.

== See also ==
- Bibliography of fly fishing
- Bass fishing
