= Flag of Bozeman, Montana =

City flag in Montana

Flag of Bozeman
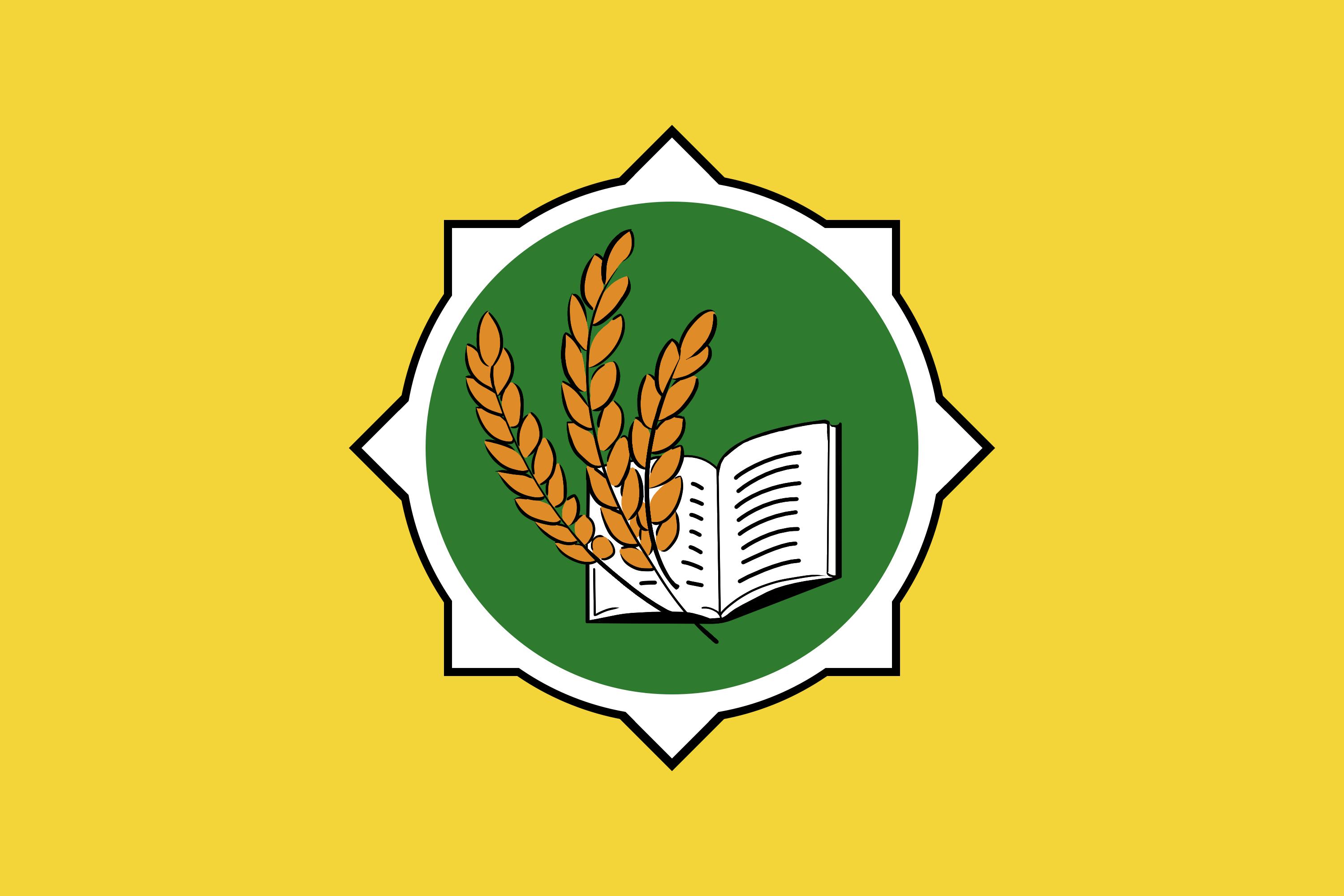
- Proportion: 2:3
- Adopted: April 27, 1966; 60 years ago (chosen); June 29, 1966; 60 years ago (first displayed)
- Designed by: Doris Ward

The flag of Bozeman, Montana, is the banner representing the city of Bozeman. It consists of a green circle containing three heads of wheat as well as an open book; the green circle is surrounded by a white circle with eight points coming out of it.

Bozeman is the fourth-largest city in Montana and is home to Montana State University. As of the 2020 census, Bozeman has a population of 53,293. The flag of Bozeman was adopted on April 27, 1966, after a flag design competition for the city; a design made by Doris Ward, a resident of Bozeman, won the competition.

== Symbolism ==
The flag's golden background symbolizes Bozeman's history. The white circle with points surrounding the green circle symbolizes snowy mountains surrounding a green valley. The heads of wheat symbolize agriculture and productivity and the book symbolizes education and progress. The 2:3 proportion has no known symbolism.

== Other official flags ==
A pride flag, one of the many official flags of Bozeman

In July 2025, a resolution entitled "A Resolution of the City Commission of the City of Bozeman, Montana, Declaring the Pride Flag and its Variants to be Official Flags of the City of Bozeman" was approved 4-1 by the city to make all pride flags official flags of Bozeman. The decision and resolution was similar to the town of Missoula, Montana, and their resolution to also make pride flags official flags of the city.
