= Foster River =

River in Saskatchewan, Canada

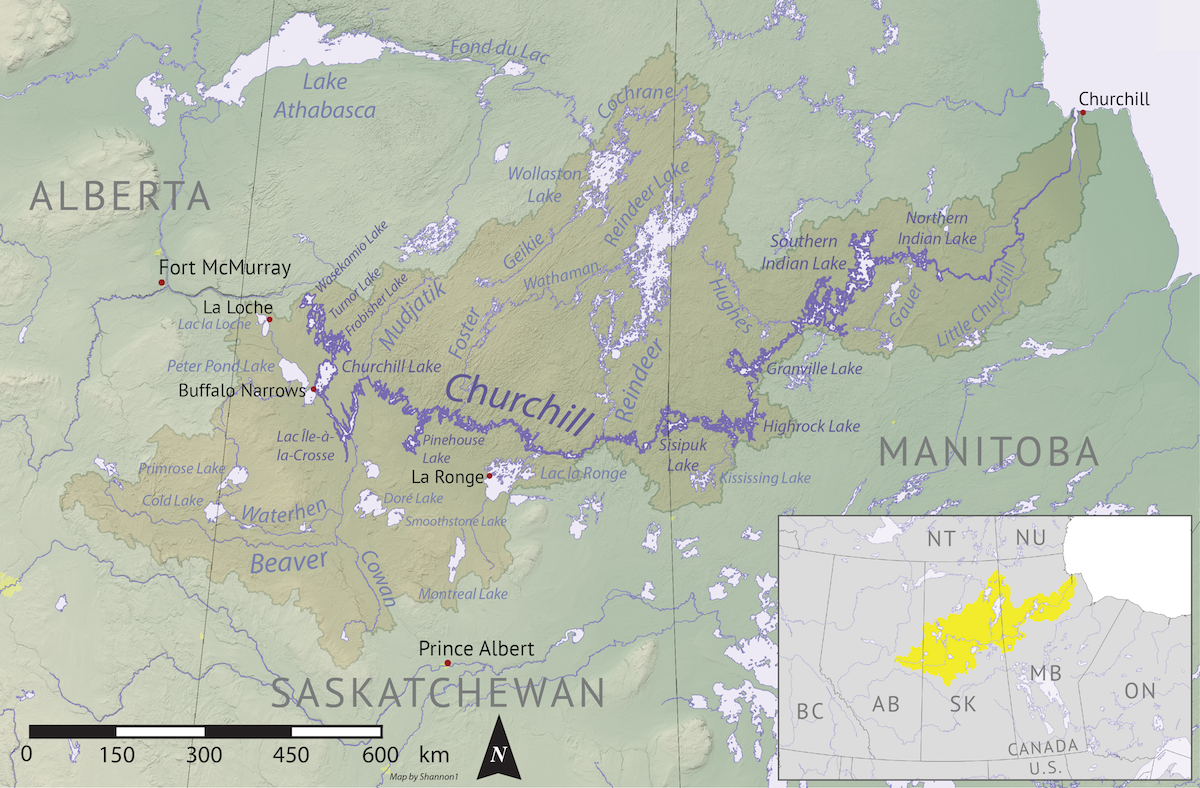
- Map of the Churchill River drainage basin

- Location of the river's mouth in Saskatchewan Foster River (Canada)

Location
- Country: Canada
- Province: Saskatchewan

Physical characteristics
- Source: Upper Foster Lake
  - location: Northern Saskatchewan Administration District
  - coordinates: 56.7337°N 105.3176°W
- Mouth: Churchill River
  - location: Northern Saskatchewan Administration District
  - coordinates: 55.7834°N 105.8172°W

Basin features
- River system: Churchill River
- Tributaries
  - left: Sandy Creek
- Waterbodies: Middle Foster Lake; Lower Foster Lake; Fiest Lake; Drew Lake; Eulas Lake
- Waterfalls: Grand Rapids

Foster River is a river in the Canadian province of Saskatchewan. It flows from Upper Foster Lake south through the Canadian Shield and boreal forest to the Churchill River. The climate is subarctic. There are several fly-in hunting and fishing outfitters along the course of the river.

== Description ==
Foster River is a major tributary of the Churchill River. Beginning at Upper Foster Lake, the river flows south for about 500 metres (1,600 ft) into the north end of Middle Foster Lake. It leaves Middle Foster Lake at the lake's eastern end and flows over Grand Rapids into Lower Foster Lake. Leaving Lower Foster Lake, the river meanders south through boreal forest and the Canadian Shield en route to the Churchill River. Along the way, it passes through several more lakes, including Fiest, Drew, and Eulas. It enters the Churchill River at Kinosaskaw Lake.

Outfitters found along Foster River include Foster Lake Lodge on Middle Foster Lake near Grand Rapids, Beaver Lodge Fly-Inn at Lower Foster Lake, and Foster River Camps at Eulas Lake.

== See also ==
- List of rivers of Saskatchewan
- Hudson Bay drainage basin
