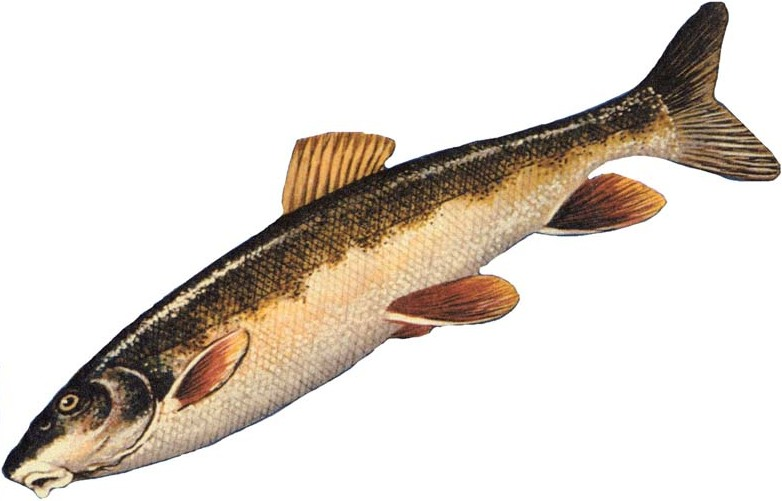

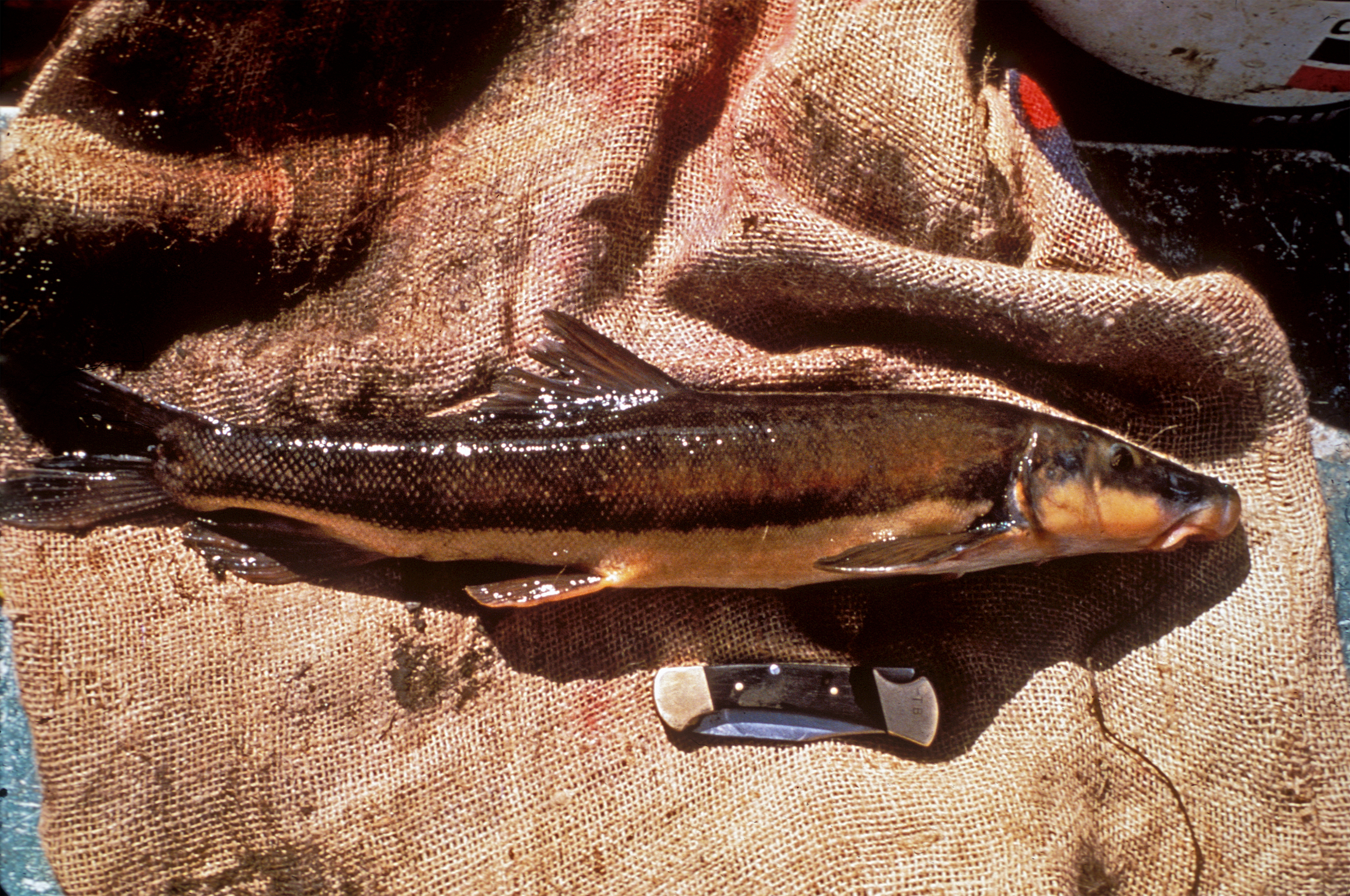

Conservation status
- Least Concern (IUCN 3.1)

Scientific classification
- Kingdom: Animalia
- Phylum: Chordata
- Class: Actinopterygii
- Order: Cypriniformes
- Family: Catostomidae
- Genus: Catostomus
- Species: C. catostomus

Binomial name
- Catostomus catostomus J. R. Forster, 1773

Subspecies
- C. c. catostomus; C. c. cristatus Cope, 1883; C. c. lacustris

Synonyms
- Cyprinus catostomus Forster, 1773; Cyprinus rostratus Tilesius, 1813; Catostomus longirostrum Lesueur, 1817; Catostomus hudsonius Lesueur, 1817; Cyprinus hudsonius (Lesueur, 1817); Catostomus communis Lesueur, 1817; Catostomus forsterianus Richardson, 1823; Catostomus aurora Agassiz, 1850; Catostomus griseus Girard, 1856; Catostomus nanomyzon Mather, 1886

= Longnose sucker =

Species of fish

The longnose sucker (Catostomus catostomus) is a species of cypriniform freshwater fish in the family Catostomidae. It is native to North America from the northern United States to the top of the continent. It is also found in Russia in rivers of eastern Siberia, and is one of only two species of sucker native to Asia (the other is the Chinese Myxocyprinus asiaticus).

== Description ==
The body of the longnose sucker is long and round with dark olive or grey sides and top and a light underside. They are up to 64 cm (25 in) in total length and weigh up to 3.3 kg (7.3 lb).

Longnose suckers are easily confused with white suckers (Catostomus commersoni), which appear very similar. However, longnose suckers can be distinguished by their comparatively finer scales.

The longnose sucker is distinctive for its physical characteristics.

First, the longnose sucker, as the name suggests, has an elongated snout which helps to distinguish the species from other suckers. The elongated snout can be 1/3 of the total body length. The longnose sucker has a circular suction disc (large lips) on the ventral side, located near the mouth. These large lips are an adaptation that allows the longnose sucker to attach itself to rocks and other substrate types in a fast-moving environment. The longnose sucker also has large and prominent scales that cover the body. These large scales provide protection from potential predators.

== Distribution and ecology ==
The longnose sucker inhabits cold, clear waters, including lakes, pools, rivers and streams, and occasionally also brackish waters. In North America, it ranges north from the Columbia, Delaware, Missouri and Monongahela river basins, as well as the Great Lakes basin. The Russian population, which sometimes is referred to as the Siberian sucker (C. c. rostratus), is found in the Yana, Indigirka, Alazeya and Kolyma river basins.

It is a bottom-feeding fish, eating aquatic plants, algae, and small invertebrates. They are preyed upon by larger predatory fish, such as bass, walleye, trout, northern pike, muskellunge and burbot.

== Relationship with humans ==
They are fished for game and food and also used as bait to catch the larger predators. The International Game Fish Association (IGFA) world record sits at 2.97 kg (6 lb 9 oz) taken from the St. Joseph River in Michigan on December 2, 1989, by angler Ben Knoll.

The longnose sucker is a freshwater fish native to North America, particularly found in rivers and lakes. Its relationship with humans is based around recreational fishing.

In recreational fishing, longnose suckers are occasionally targeted by anglers for sport or as bait fish. They provide a challenge to anglers as they have strong fighting abilities. Longnose suckers are typically not sought after for human consumption.

The longnose sucker plays a crucial and vital ecological role as they are bottom feeders. As bottom feeders, the longnose suckers consume detritus and algae while stirring up the sediment. The bottom feeding behavior helps maintain water quality and helps improve the health of the aquatic ecosystem.

As for conservation, the longnose sucker faces habitat loss, water pollution, and competition from invasive species. Trout Unlimited, a conservation organization, is focused on habitat restoration and research initiatives to protect and enhance longnose sucker populations.

== Breeding process ==
During the spring, when water temperatures rise, longnose suckers migrate to their spawning grounds in rivers and streams. Males develop tubercles on their heads and bodies, indicating their readiness to breed. They compete for the attention of females by displaying vibrant colors and engaging in energetic courtship behaviors. Once a female selects a mate, they engage in an elaborate spawning ritual. The female releases her eggs while the male fertilizes them externally. After spawning, the adults return to their regular habitats, leaving the eggs to develop and hatch. The young longnose suckers then begin their journey, growing and adapting to their environment. The breeding life of longnose suckers contributes to the biodiversity and vitality of freshwater ecosystems.
