= Fred Mather =

American pisciculturist and educator

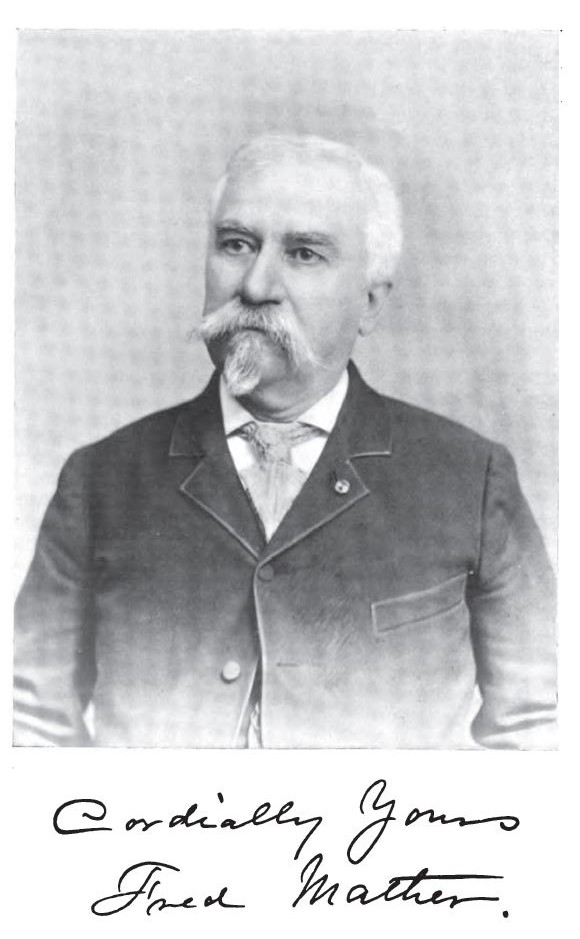
Fred Mather, Frontispiece from The Men I Have Fished With, 1897

Fred Mather (January 2, 1833, in Albany, New York – February 14, 1900) was a United States pisciculturist and a writer and editor on fishing topics.

== Life and career ==
In 1854 he became interested in the lead mines of Potosi, Wisconsin, and afterward hunted and trapped in the Bad Axe country in that state. Here he learned enough of the Chippewa language to become interpreter to the government survey in northern Minnesota. During the political troubles in Kansas he served under General James Lane, and was one of Jennison's "Jayhawkers." He enlisted in the 113th New York regiment in 1862, and became 1st lieutenant two years later. At the close of the American Civil War, he took a clerkship in the stock yards near Albany.

In 1868 he bought a farm at Honeoye Falls, New York, and began to hatch fish of various kinds. When the U.S. Fish Commission was formed in 1872 he was sent for by Professor Spencer F. Baird to hatch shad for the Potomac River. In 1875, he established hatcheries at Lexington and Blacksburg for the state of Virginia. A year earlier he had hatched the first sea bass and graylings.

After several vain attempts to transport salmon eggs to Europe, he devised a refrigerator box, and in 1875 succeeded in carrying the eggs to Germany. He also, at the same time, invented a conical hatching apparatus, by which, through the admission of water at the bottom, shad and other eggs were hatched in bulk instead of in layers upon trays or floating boxes. In 1884 he hatched the adhesive eggs of the smelt, although all previous attempts had been failures.

He was sent abroad several times by the U. S. government in connection with fish culture, and he received medals and testimonials from many scientific societies of Europe. In 1877 he became fishery editor of The Chicago Field, and from 1880 he held a like position with Forest and Stream in New York City. In 1882 he was sent by Professor Baird to Roslyn, Long Island, to hatch salmon for the Hudson River. In 1883 he was appointed superintendent of the New York Fish Commission station at Cold Spring Harbor, Long Island. Here the hatching of lobsters, codfish, and other marine forms was begun.

He published Ichthyology of the Adirondacks (1885), which described several fishes previously unknown.
