= National Register of Historic Places listings in Park County, Montana =

Location of Park County in Montana

This is a list of the National Register of Historic Places listings in Park County, Montana.

This is intended to be a complete list of the properties and districts on the National Register of Historic Places in Park County, Montana, United States. The locations of National Register properties and districts for which the latitude and longitude coordinates are included below, may be seen in a map.

There are 35 properties and districts listed on the National Register in the county, including 1 National Historic Landmark.

This National Park Service list is complete through NPS recent listings posted April 24, 2026.

== Current listings ==
	Name on the Register	Image	Date listed	Location	City or town	Description
1	B Street District	B Street District	September 5, 1979 (#79001408)	307-317 B St. 45°39′35″N 110°33′18″W	Livingston	Four small one-story houses
2	Oliver and Lucy Bonnell Gothic Arch Roofed Barn		September 15, 2004 (#04000978)	247 Shields River Road, E. 45°47′31″N 110°29′55″W	Clyde Park	
3	Carbella Bridge	Carbella Bridge	January 4, 2010 (#09001184)	Milepost 0 on Tom Miner Rd., near its junction with U.S. Route 89; 45°12′16″N 110°54′06″W	Gardiner	Destroyed by the 2022 Montana floods, June 13, 2022.
4	Carter Bridge	Carter Bridge	April 28, 2011 (#11000226)	Milepost 31.6 on MT 540; 45°35′49″N 110°34′02″W	Livingston vicinity	Reinforced Concrete Bridges in Montana, 1900-1958 MPS
5	Chicken Creek Farmstead Historic District		December 12, 2008 (#08001194)	790 Rock Creek Rd., N. 45°53′23″N 110°25′32″W	Clyde Park	
6	Chico Hot Springs	Chico Hot Springs	August 21, 1998 (#98001085)	2 miles northeast of Chico, 3.5 miles southeast of Emigrant; 45°20′10″N 110°41′35″W	Pray	
7	Commercial District	Commercial District	September 5, 1979 (#79001409)	Roughly bounded by Park, C, Clark, 3rd, and Callendar Sts. 45°39′34″N 110°33′48″W	Livingston	
8	Convict Grade Historic District		August 3, 2015 (#15000485)	1 mi. E. of jct. with US 89; 45°43′46″N 110°26′15″W	Springdale vicinity	
9	Cooke City Store	Cooke City Store	March 27, 1986 (#86000527)	Main St. 45°01′10″N 109°56′02″W	Cooke City	
10	Detention Hospital	Detention Hospital	September 5, 1979 (#79001410)	325 E. Gallatin St. 45°40′04″N 110°33′35″W	Livingston	
11	East Side Residential District	East Side Residential District	September 5, 1979 (#79001411)	Roughly bounded by I, Clark, E, and Park Sts. 45°39′53″N 110°33′07″W	Livingston	
12	Ebert Ranch		September 5, 1979 (#79001412)	U.S. Route 89; 45°42′03″N 110°31′11″W	Livingston	
13	Gardiner Bridge		February 6, 2025 (#100011446)	Milepost 0.1 on U.S. Highway 89/Second Street; 45°01′56″N 110°42′20″W	Gardiner	
14	Gardiner Jail	Gardiner Jail	August 3, 2015 (#15000486)	2nd St. 45°01′55″N 110°42′21″W	Gardiner	
15	Harvat Ranch		September 5, 1979 (#79001413)	Southeast of Livingston off U.S. Route 89; 45°40′05″N 110°31′59″W	Livingston	
16	John Hepburn Place	John Hepburn Place	October 19, 2005 (#05001177)	626 E. River Rd. 45°17′40″N 110°49′53″W	Emigrant	
17	Herbert Summer Cabin		August 4, 2025 (#100012056)	West Boulder tract 45°33′01″N 110°18′43″W	Big Timber vicinity	
18	KPRK Radio	KPRK Radio	September 5, 1979 (#79001414)	East of dowtwon Livingston off U.S. Route 89; 45°40′22″N 110°32′24″W	Livingston vicinity	
19	Krohne Island House		September 5, 1979 (#79001415)	Krohne Island; 45°40′15″N 110°32′30″W	Livingston	
20	Krohne Spring House	Krohne Spring House	September 5, 1979 (#79001416)	329 S. H St. 45°39′47″N 110°32′53″W	Livingston	
21	Livingston Memorial Hospital	Livingston Memorial Hospital	April 16, 2018 (#100002309)	504 S. 13th St. 45°38′59″N 110°34′08″W	Livingston	
22	Main Boulder Ranger Station		July 1, 2024 (#100010504)	2815 Main Boulder Rd; 45°31′22″N 110°13′27″W	McLeod	
23	Billy Miles & Bros. Grain Elevator	Billy Miles & Bros. Grain Elevator	September 23, 2020 (#100005604)	Jct. of East Park St. (US 89 Bus.) and North G St. 45°39′59″N 110°33′15″W	Livingston	
24	North Entrance Road Historic District	North Entrance Road Historic District	May 22, 2002 (#02000529)	Yellowstone National Park; 45°00′24″N 110°41′58″W	Yellowstone National Park	Road between North Entrance and Mammoth Hot Springs; extends into Park County, Wyoming.
25	Northeast Entrance Station	Northeast Entrance Station	May 28, 1987 (#87001435)	U.S. Route 212; 45°00′17″N 110°00′33″W	Yellowstone National Park	
26	Northside School	Northside School	September 5, 1979 (#79001417)	118 W. Chinook St. 45°39′51″N 110°33′49″W	Livingston	
27	OTO Homestead and Dude Ranch	OTO Homestead and Dude Ranch	October 12, 2004 (#99000054)	15 miles north of Gardiner; 45°08′41″N 110°21′13″W	Gardiner	
28	Red Lodge-Cooke City Approach Road Historic District	Red Lodge-Cooke City Approach Road Historic District	May 8, 2014 (#14000219)	US 212; 45°01′06″N 109°56′25″W	Cooke City	Extends into Carbon County, Montana and Park County, Wyoming
29	Rolfson House	Rolfson House	September 5, 1979 (#79001418)	West of Livingston on Bozeman Rd. 45°39′42″N 110°40′17″W	Livingston vicinity	
30	Sacajawea-Miles Parks Historic District	Sacajawea-Miles Parks Historic District	April 24, 2023 (#100008882)	Roughly bounded by West Butte and South 2nd Sts., River Dr., a channel of the lagoon to the north and west, the Yellowstone R., and River Dr. 45°39′15″N 110°33′18″W	Livingston	
31	Sixty-Three Ranch	Sixty-Three Ranch	December 7, 1982 (#82000595)	Address restricted	Livingston	
32	Trowbridge Dairy	Trowbridge Dairy	September 5, 1979 (#79001419)	207 S. M St. 45°40′04″N 110°32′40″W	Livingston	
33	Urbach Cabin	Urbach Cabin	September 5, 1979 (#79001420)	9th St. Island; 45°38′54″N 110°33′34″W	Livingston	
34	US Post Office-Livingston Main	US Post Office-Livingston Main	March 14, 1986 (#86000685)	105 N. 2nd St. 45°39′39″N 110°33′40″W	Livingston	
35	West Side Residential District	West Side Residential District	September 5, 1979 (#79001421)	Roughly bounded by Sacajawea Park, 7th, Park, and 3rd Sts. 45°39′26″N 110°33′42″W	Livingston	

== See also ==
- List of National Historic Landmarks in Montana
- National Register of Historic Places listings in Montana
