= Gardiner, Montana =

Unincorporated community in Park County, Montana, United States

- Unincorporated community
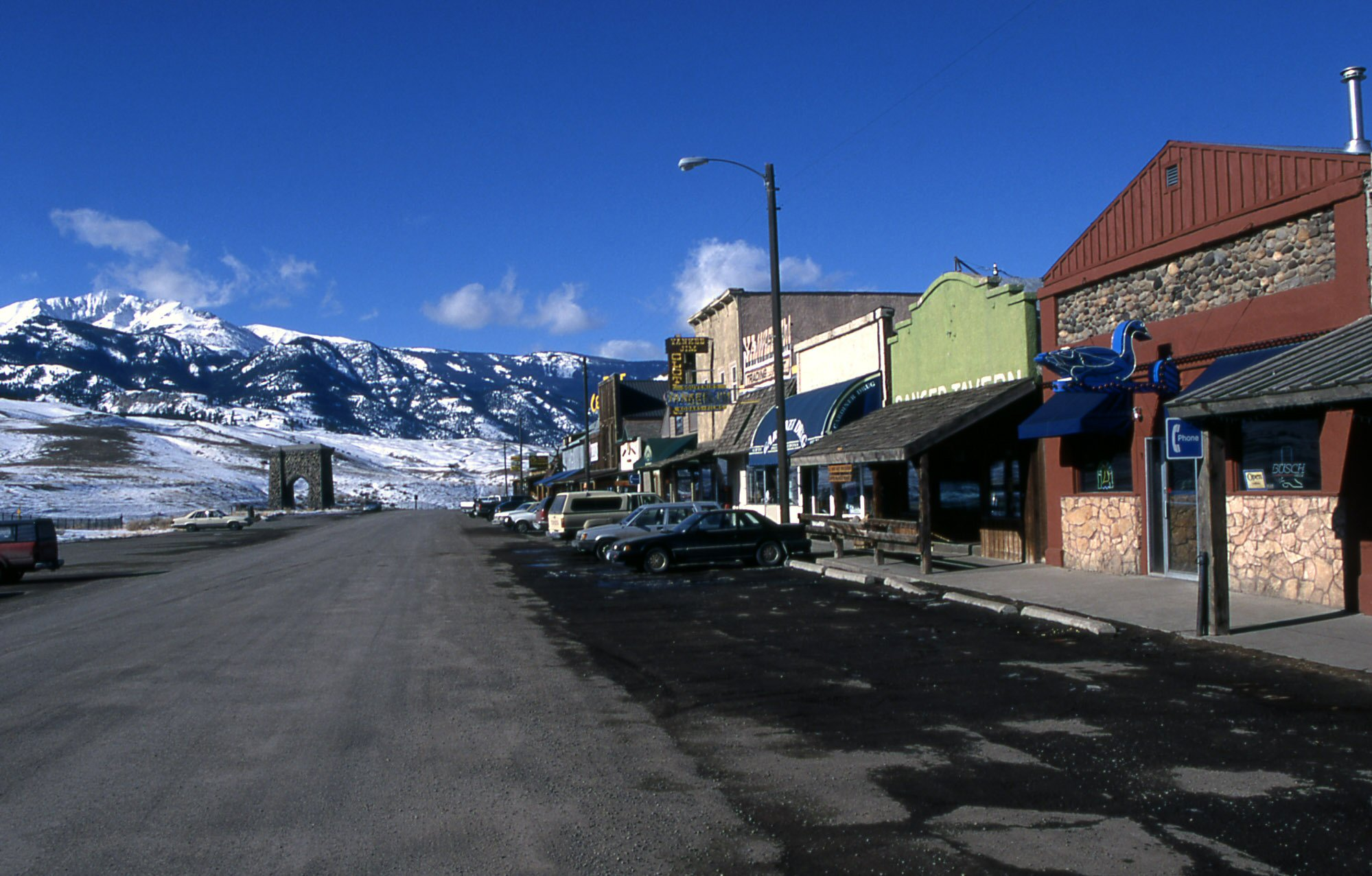
- Downtown (1999)

- Location within Park County and Montana
- Coordinates: 45°03′43″N 110°45′20″W
- Country: United States
- State: Montana
- County: Park
- Founded: 1880

Area
  - Total: 5.90 sq mi (15.27 km^{2})
  - Land: 5.79 sq mi (15.00 km^{2})
  - Water: 0.10 sq mi (0.27 km^{2})
- Elevation: 5,939 ft (1,810 m)

Population (2020)
  - Total: 833
  - Density: 143.8/sq mi (55.52/km^{2})
- Time zone: UTC-7 (Mountain (MST))
  - Summer (DST): UTC-6 (MDT)
- ZIP code: 59030
- Area code: 406
- FIPS code: 30-29950
- GNIS ID: 2408279

Gardiner is a census-designated place (CDP) in Park County, Montana, United States, along the 45th parallel. As of the 2020 census, the population of the community and nearby areas was 833.

Gardiner was officially founded in 1880. The area has served as a main entrance to Yellowstone National Park since its creation in 1872. Yellowstone National Park Heritage and Research Center, which opened May 18, 2005, is located in Gardiner and houses National Park Service archives, Yellowstone museum collections and reference libraries.

Gardiner was impacted by the 2022 Montana floods.

== Etymology ==
The name "Gardiner" derives from Johnson Gardner, a fur trapper who operated in the area in 1830–31. He named the lush headwaters valley of today's Gardner River "Gardner's Hole". Originally named "Gardner's Fork", the river took on Gardner's name, although prospectors and explorers who visited the area later in the century were unaware of the trapper Johnson Gardner. In 1870, when the Washburn–Langford–Doane Expedition passed through the area, they began calling the river "Gardiner," a phonetic error. Hiram M. Chittenden (1895) and Nathaniel P. Langford (1905) confirmed this spelling in their accounts of the expedition.

=== McCartney's hotel ===
When the Hayden Geological Survey of 1871 passed through the Gardiner area, they encountered two men, named J.C. McCartney and H. R. Horr, who had laid claim to 320 acres (1.3 km^{2}) and established a ranch and bath house on the Mammoth terraces near Liberty Cap. These entrepreneurs eventually established a primitive hotel at Mammoth, and were not evicted from the area until many years after the park was established. McCartney also went by the name "Jim Gardiner" and received messages, consignments and such destined for guests of his hotel addressed to "Jim on the Gardiner".

== History ==
=== Pre-contact ===
Evidence shows that Native Americans have lived and hunted in the Gardiner area since at least 11,000 years ago. In the Nez Perce War of 1877, the United States forced all the Nez Perce people who formerly lived on the Yellowstone Plateau, which includes Gardiner, onto reservations.

=== Early Gardiner ===
Between 1860 and 1880, the confluence of the Gardner and Yellowstone Rivers (exactly where Gardiner is located today) was settled by prospectors and entrepreneurs interested in placer claims and the local hot springs. Gold was discovered along Bear Gulch in 1865, and claims caused a large rise in new settlers. Along with prospecting the rivers themselves, new settlers would arrive and start ranches in order to make a living supplying them. A notable homesteader was James C. McCartney, who had initially built a hotel near Mammoth Hot Springs, but due to his relationship with park officials and shifting park policies relocated to Gardiner in 1879.

Yellowstone National Park was established in 1872. Settlers now also started businesses catering to early park visitors and the U.S. Army, facing the park and located very closely on the park's north boundary. Gardiner's future location was well-placed for this.

Notable services the town provided to coal miners, gold miners, and soldiers nearby were drinking, gambling, and prostitutution. Early on, the small town of Gardiner was described in one account as "a veritable Shantyville... an ideal squatter town, with the rudest houses."

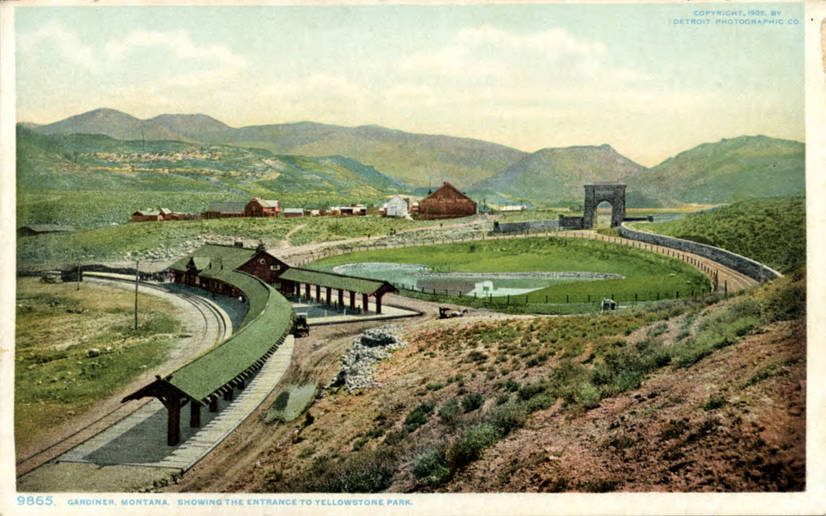
Early 1900s postcard showing Gardiner

In the early 1880s, the Northern Pacific Railroad announced a planned branch line to Yellowstone Park near Gardiner. In 1883, the Northern Pacific Railway had completed the extension of their Park Branch Line from Livingston, Montana to Cinnabar, a new town north of Gardiner that grew up around the rail line terminus. The terminus would have been in Gardiner itself, but land disputes made that impossible until 1902. Despite this, Gardiner continued to grow, spurred on strongly by the speculation that the railroad terminus would eventually arrive.

On February 9, 1880, a territorial post office was established just outside the park boundary. Park County was created in 1887, and county officials both hired a constable and built the first jail in Gardiner. Unfortunately, this jail burned down in 1898, making it impossible to lock up drunks and criminals.

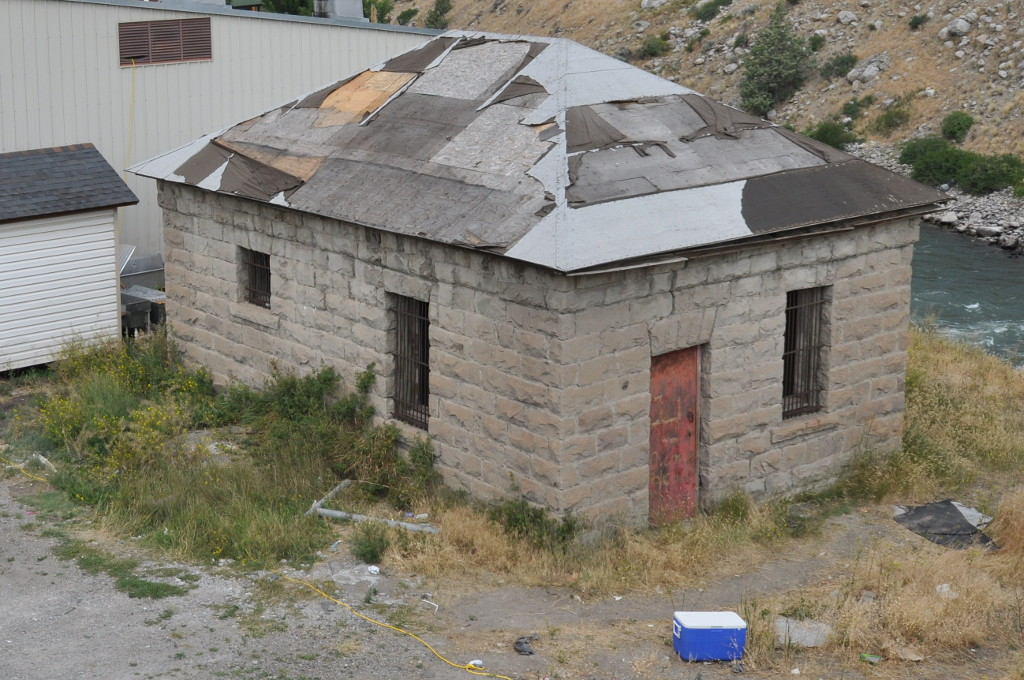
Gardiner Jail (the second one)

The first trains finally arriving in Gardiner in 1902, filled with tourists, arrived to views of prostitutes showing off in front of the train windows. According to a local newspaper account, "Monday night there was almost continuous yelling and shooting from midnight to daylight. Women of ill-fame live in the central part of town and exhibit themselves daily on the streets in bedroom wrappers and make a show of themselves in doors and windows on arrival of the train." A new jail was ready by mid-September 1903.

The arrival of the railroad caused the town to flourish, continuing to serve tourists and local soldiers.

Later, as automobiles became more important, the town adapted to serve them.

=== Modern history ===
Railway service at Gardiner station was eventually discontinued, specifically in 1948. Its role was taken on by the state highway passing through the town.

By 2022 housing prices had increased in Gardiner, and there were fewer families.

== Geography ==
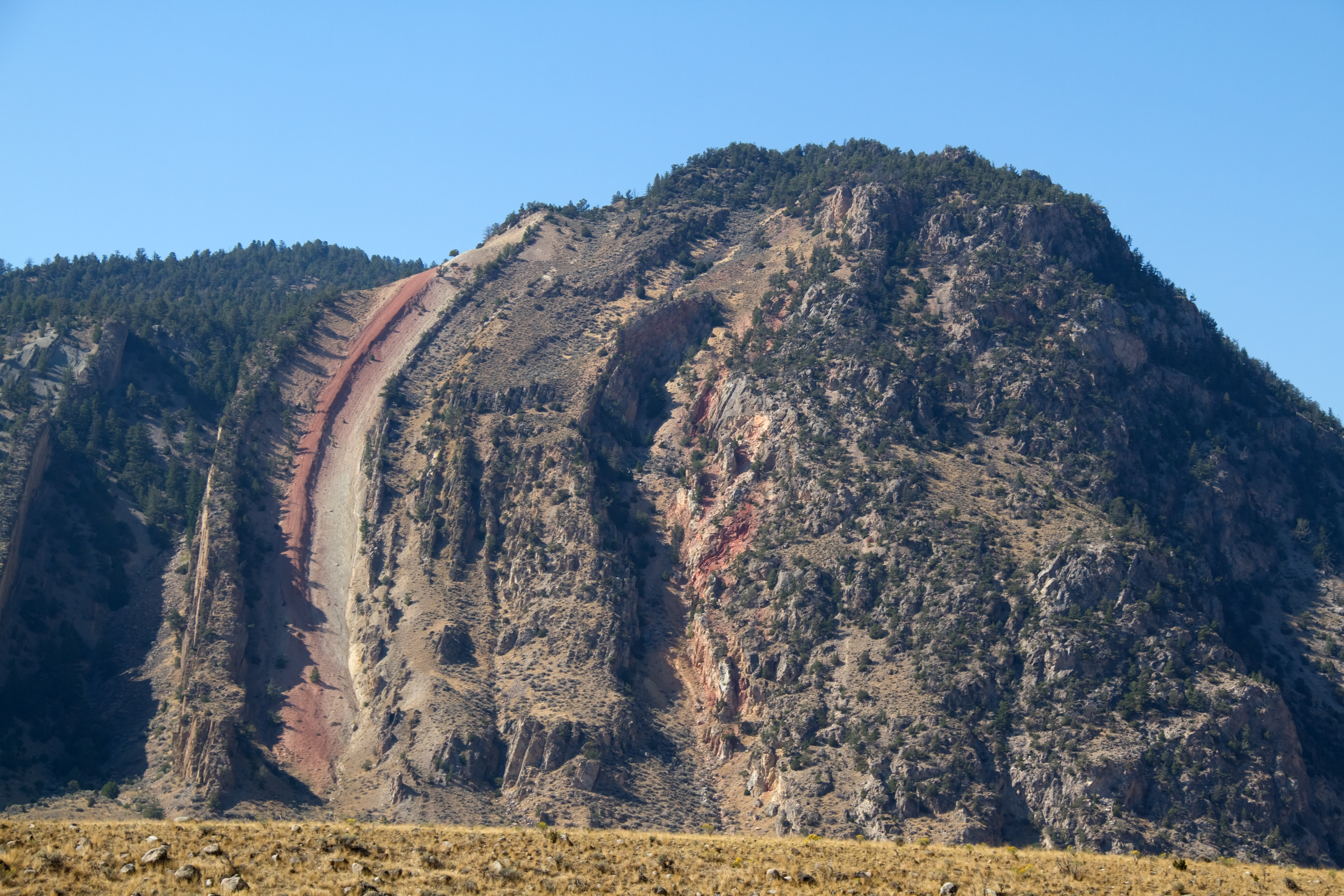
Devil's Slide, north of Gardiner

According to the United States Census Bureau, the CDP has a total area of 3.9 square miles (10 km^{2}), of which 3.8 square miles (9.8 km^{2}) is land and 0.1 square miles (0.26 km^{2}) (2.32%) is water.

Gardiner acts as a gateway community for Yellowstone National Park.

It is located at the confluence of the Gardiner River and the Yellowstone River.

== Climate ==
According to the Köppen Climate Classification system, Gardiner has a cold semi-arid climate, abbreviated "BSk" on climate maps.

Climate data for Gardiner, Montana, 1991–2020 normals, extremes 1956–present
Month	Jan	Feb	Mar	Apr	May	Jun	Jul	Aug	Sep	Oct	Nov	Dec	Year
Record high °F (°C)	58 (14)	62 (17)	70 (21)	88 (31)	92 (33)	100 (38)	103 (39)	102 (39)	97 (36)	87 (31)	70 (21)	62 (17)	103 (39)
Mean maximum °F (°C)	47.3 (8.5)	50.7 (10.4)	63.0 (17.2)	72.7 (22.6)	81.9 (27.7)	90.8 (32.7)	95.8 (35.4)	94.7 (34.8)	89.6 (32.0)	76.8 (24.9)	59.8 (15.4)	48.1 (8.9)	96.6 (35.9)
Mean daily maximum °F (°C)	34.7 (1.5)	38.4 (3.6)	48.5 (9.2)	57.2 (14.0)	66.9 (19.4)	77.4 (25.2)	87.2 (30.7)	86.0 (30.0)	75.5 (24.2)	59.8 (15.4)	43.7 (6.5)	33.8 (1.0)	59.1 (15.1)
Daily mean °F (°C)	25.8 (−3.4)	28.3 (−2.1)	36.9 (2.7)	44.5 (6.9)	53.0 (11.7)	61.9 (16.6)	70.2 (21.2)	68.9 (20.5)	59.9 (15.5)	47.1 (8.4)	33.8 (1.0)	25.3 (−3.7)	46.3 (7.9)
Mean daily minimum °F (°C)	16.9 (−8.4)	18.1 (−7.7)	25.4 (−3.7)	31.8 (−0.1)	39.2 (4.0)	46.4 (8.0)	53.2 (11.8)	51.7 (10.9)	44.2 (6.8)	34.4 (1.3)	24.0 (−4.4)	16.8 (−8.4)	33.5 (0.8)
Mean minimum °F (°C)	−4.2 (−20.1)	−4.1 (−20.1)	6.2 (−14.3)	18.8 (−7.3)	26.2 (−3.2)	35.0 (1.7)	44.4 (6.9)	41.6 (5.3)	31.2 (−0.4)	18.6 (−7.4)	3.3 (−15.9)	−5.2 (−20.7)	−14.0 (−25.6)
Record low °F (°C)	−30 (−34)	−31 (−35)	−16 (−27)	4 (−16)	11 (−12)	25 (−4)	30 (−1)	30 (−1)	12 (−11)	−8 (−22)	−23 (−31)	−30 (−34)	−31 (−35)
Average precipitation inches (mm)	0.77 (20)	0.63 (16)	0.91 (23)	0.92 (23)	1.97 (50)	1.89 (48)	1.33 (34)	0.98 (25)	1.24 (31)	1.48 (38)	0.96 (24)	0.81 (21)	13.89 (353)
Average snowfall inches (cm)	4.5 (11)	3.2 (8.1)	2.3 (5.8)	1.9 (4.8)	0.7 (1.8)	0.1 (0.25)	0.0 (0.0)	0.0 (0.0)	0.0 (0.0)	0.5 (1.3)	4.9 (12)	4.1 (10)	22.2 (55.05)
Average precipitation days (≥ 0.01 in)	5.1	4.8	5.1	6.3	8.1	8.2	6.5	5.7	5.1	6.4	6.5	5.8	73.6
Average snowy days (≥ 0.1 in)	3.0	2.4	1.9	1.5	0.5	0.1	0.0	0.0	0.1	0.5	2.4	2.8	15.2
Source 1: NOAA
Source 2: National Weather Service

== Demographics ==
Historical population
Census	Pop.	Note	%±
2000	851		—
2010	875		2.8%
2020	833		−4.8%
U.S. Decennial Census

As of the census of 2000, there were 851 people residing in Gardiner. The population density was 224.9 inhabitants per square mile (86.8/km^{2}). The racial makeup of was 97.30% White, 0.35% African American, 1.41% Native American, 0.24% Asian, 0.12% from other races, and 0.59% from two or more races. Hispanic or Latino people of any race were 0.47% of the population.

There were 435 households, of which 22.1% had children under the age of 18 living with them, 40.0% were married couples living together, and 51.5% were non-families. 43.2% of all households were made up of individuals, and 4.8% had someone living alone who was 65 years of age or older. The average household size was 1.96 people and the average family size 2.73.

In 2000, 20.8% were under the age of 18, 2.9% from 18 to 24, 40.5% from 25 to 44, 28.0% from 45 to 64, and 7.8% who were 65 years of age or older.

The median income for a household was $30,125, and the median income for a family was $46,071. Men had a median income of $30,240 versus $17,614 for women. About 8.2% of the population were below the poverty line, including 4.8% of those under age 18 and none of those age 65 or over.

== Economy ==
From the beginning, tourism has been the primary industry in Gardiner.

The Jardine Mine closed in 1996. After that point, tourism became even more dominant in Gardiner.

== Education ==
Gardiner Public Schools has a single educational building. Its divisions are:

- Gardiner School (grades K-6; 101 students)
- Gardiner 7-8 School (grades 7–8; 44 students)
- Gardiner High School (grades 9–12; 85 students)

The CDP is in both Gardiner Elementary School District and Gardiner High School District, the two components of the Gardiner Public Schools school district.

A library in Gardiner opened in the 20th century.

== Infrastructure ==
Gardiner Airport is a public use airport located two miles (3.7 km) northwest of town.

== Media ==
AM radio	FM radio	Television
KBOZ 1090	KOBB-FM 93.7	KTVM 6 NBC
KOBB 1230	KMMS-FM 94.7	KBZK 7 CBS
KPRK 1340	KISN 96.7	KUSM 9 PBS
KMMS 1450	KOZB 97.5	
	KBOZ-FM 99.9 Gardiner Field, Montana was reported destroyed by an "enemy A-bomb" in the movie Invasion U.S.A.	
	KXLB 100.7	
	KZMY 103.5	
	KBZM 104.7	
	KSCY 106.9	

== Gallery ==
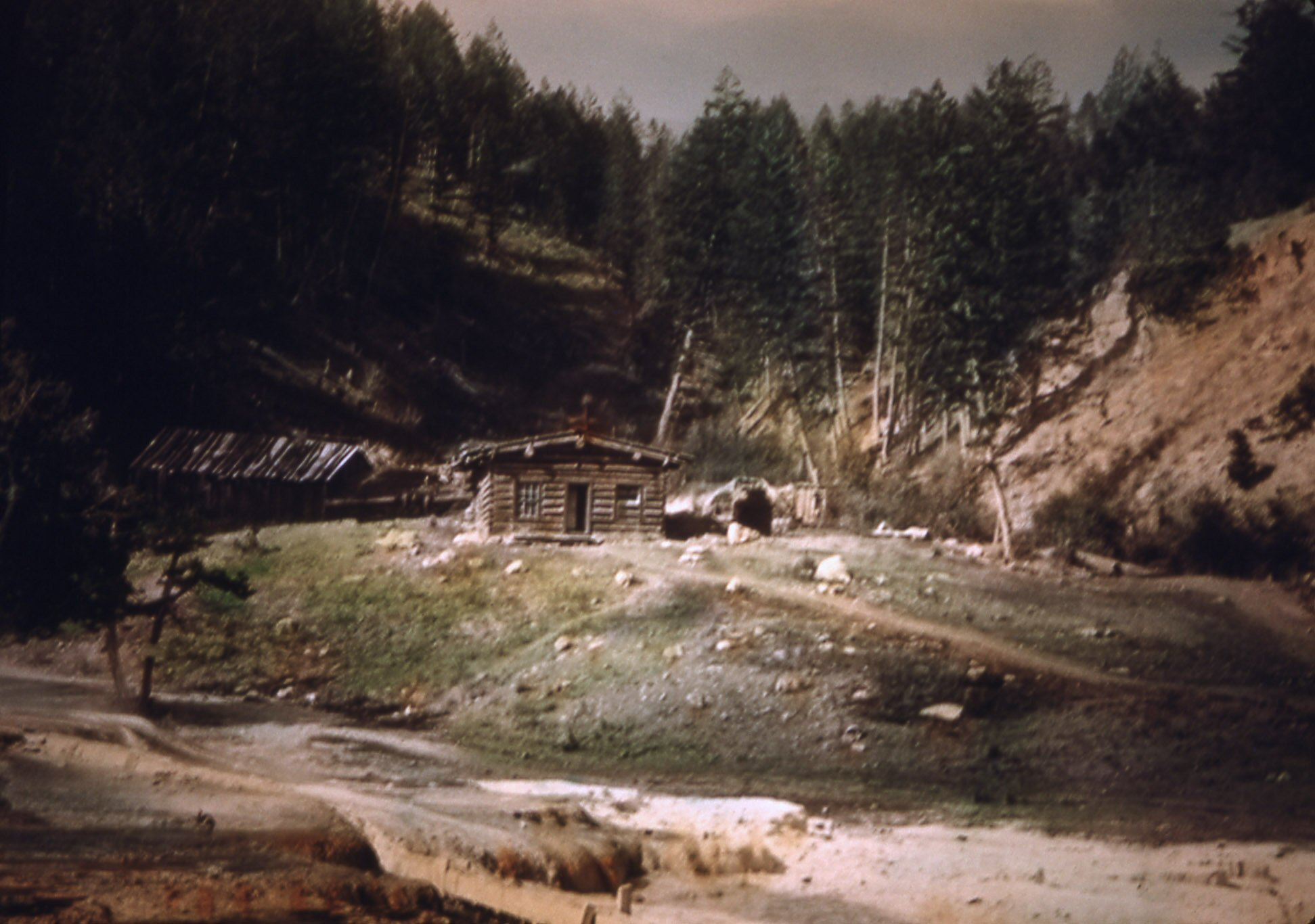
McCartney's Hotel, precursor of the Gardiner settlement

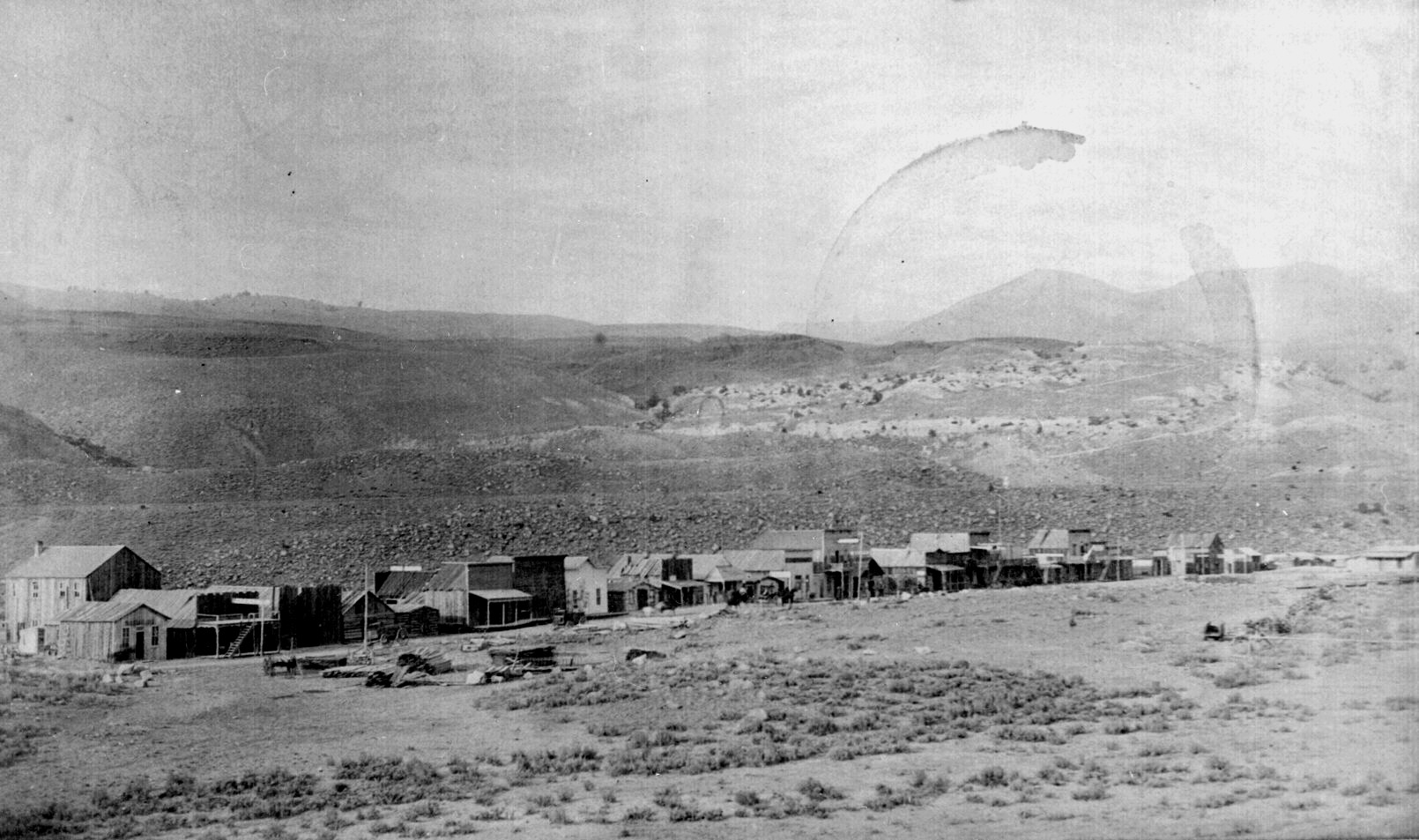
Gardiner, Park County, Montana, looking northeast, 1887. A one-sided street backed up to rocky foothills.

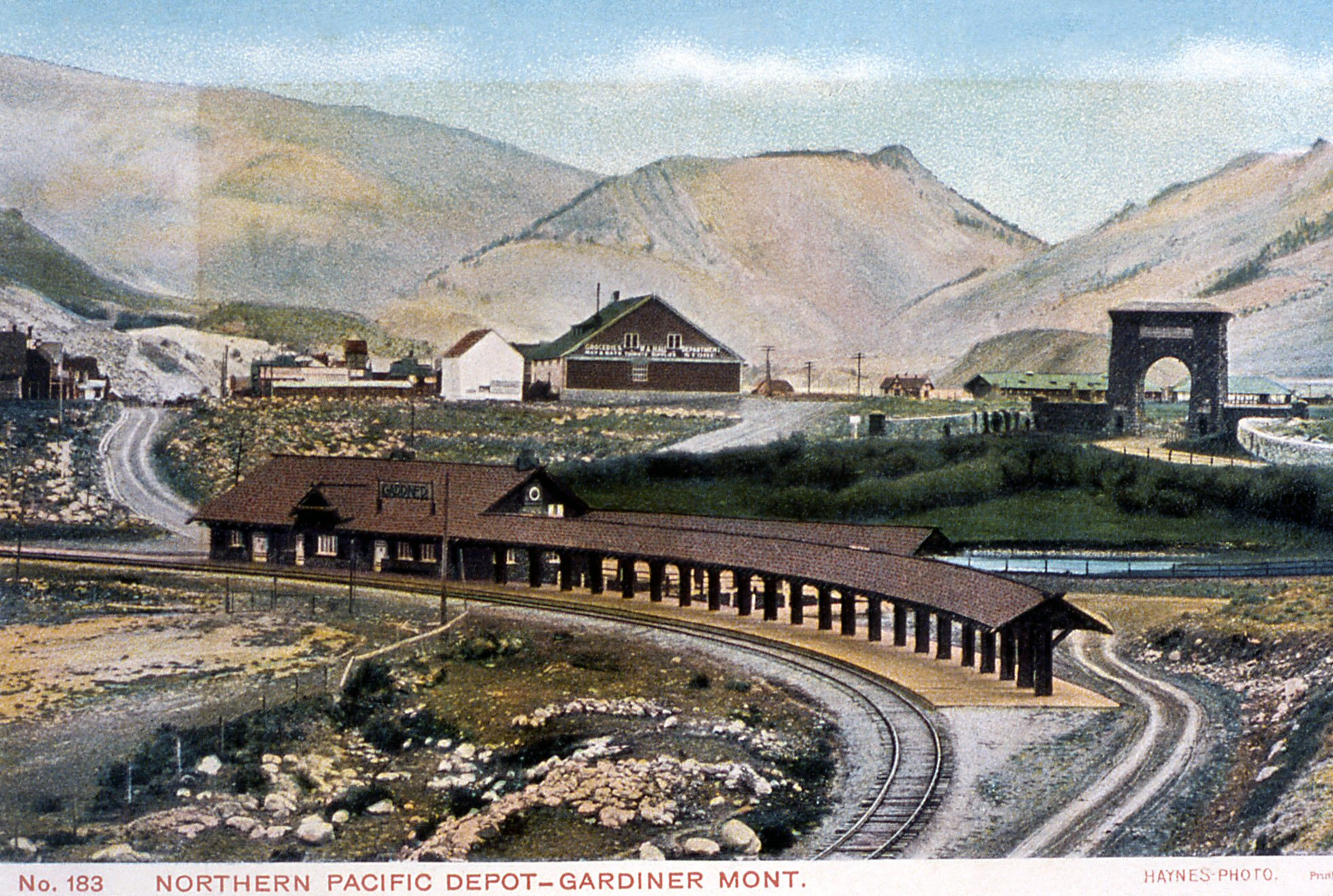
Northern Pacific Railway Terminal postcard, F. Jay Haynes

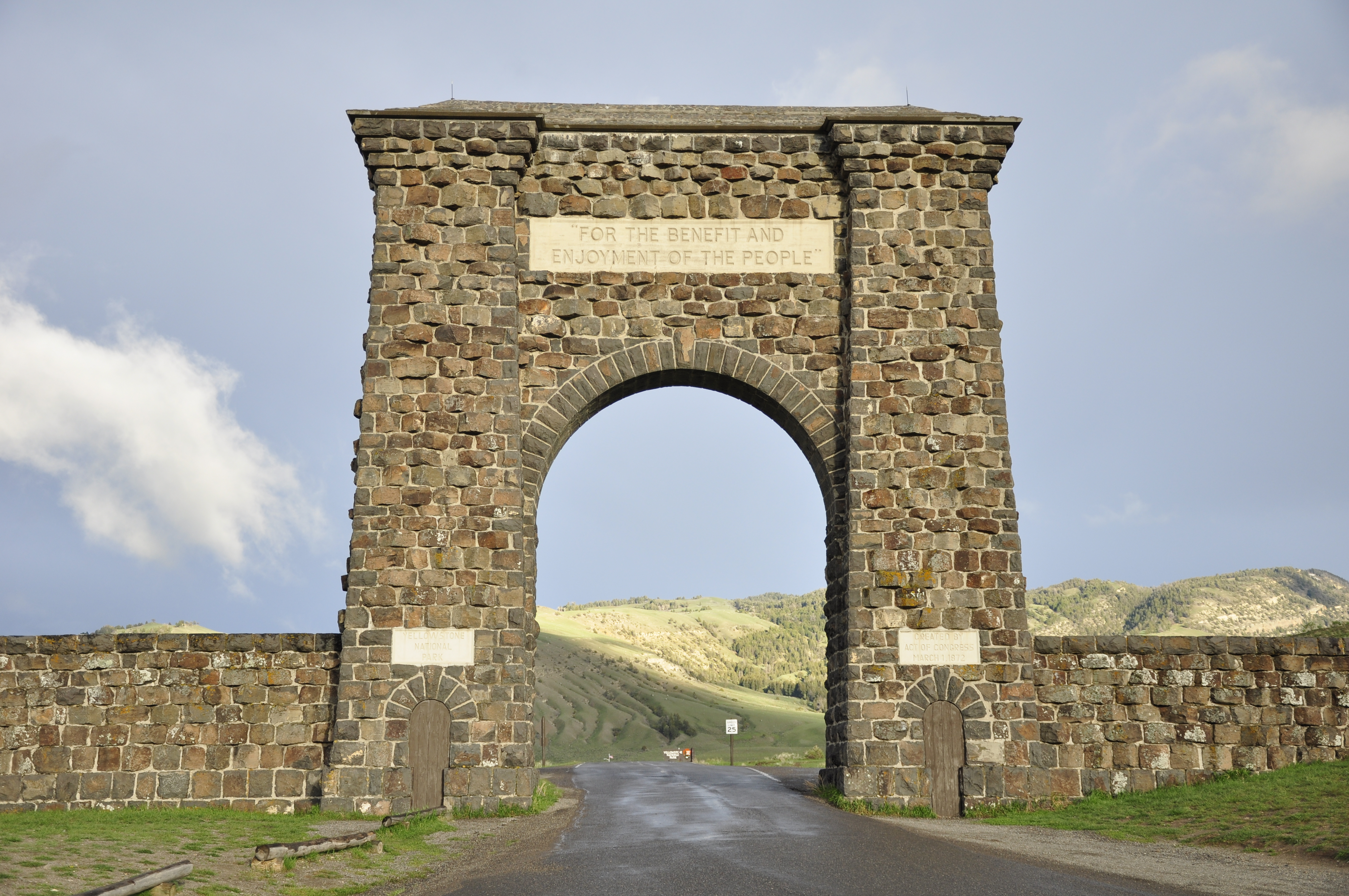
Roosevelt Arch at Yellowstone's north entrance

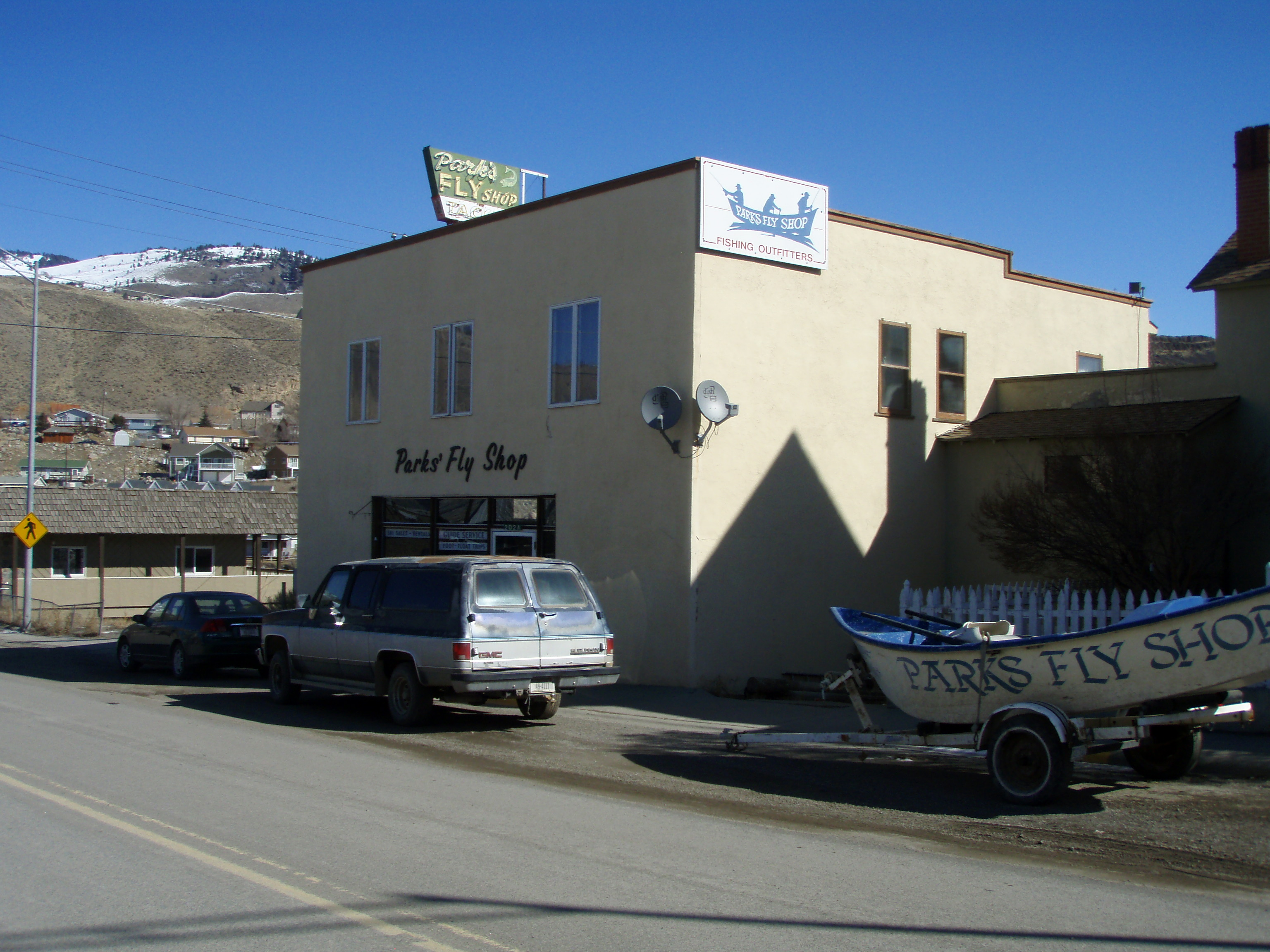
Parks' Fly Shop, 2nd Street, 2009

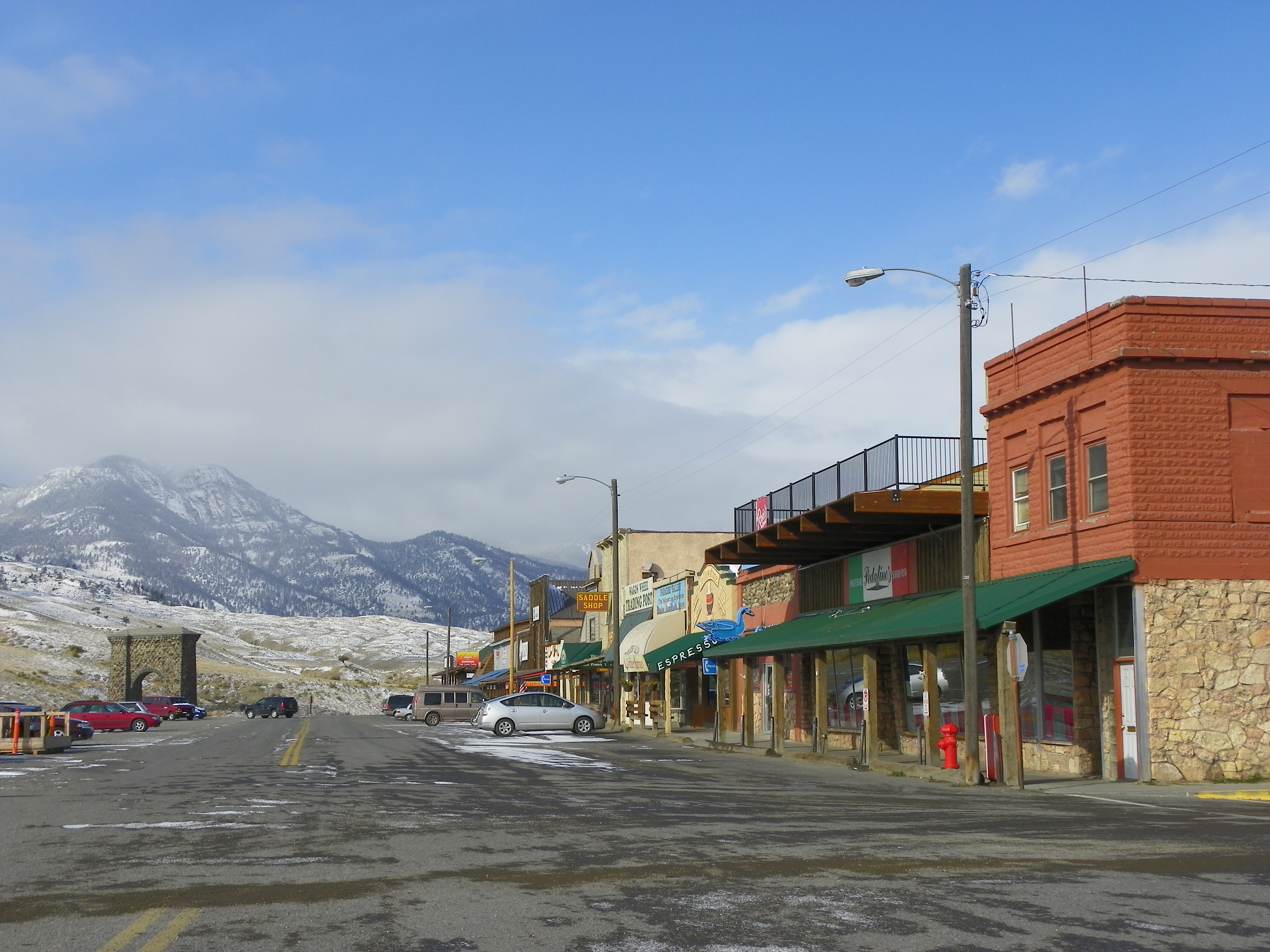
Park Street, October 2009 with Roosevelt Arch

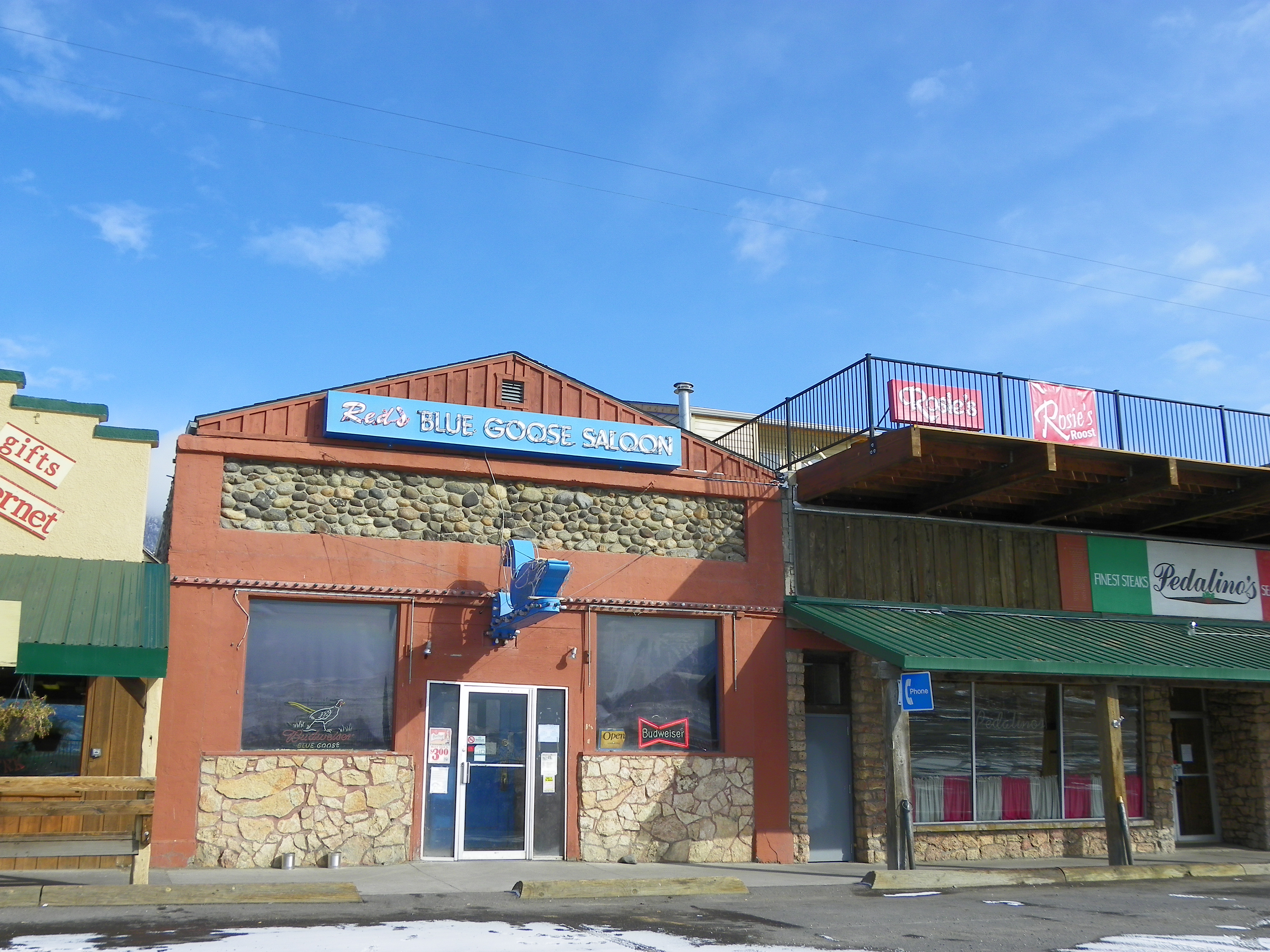
Red's Blue Goose

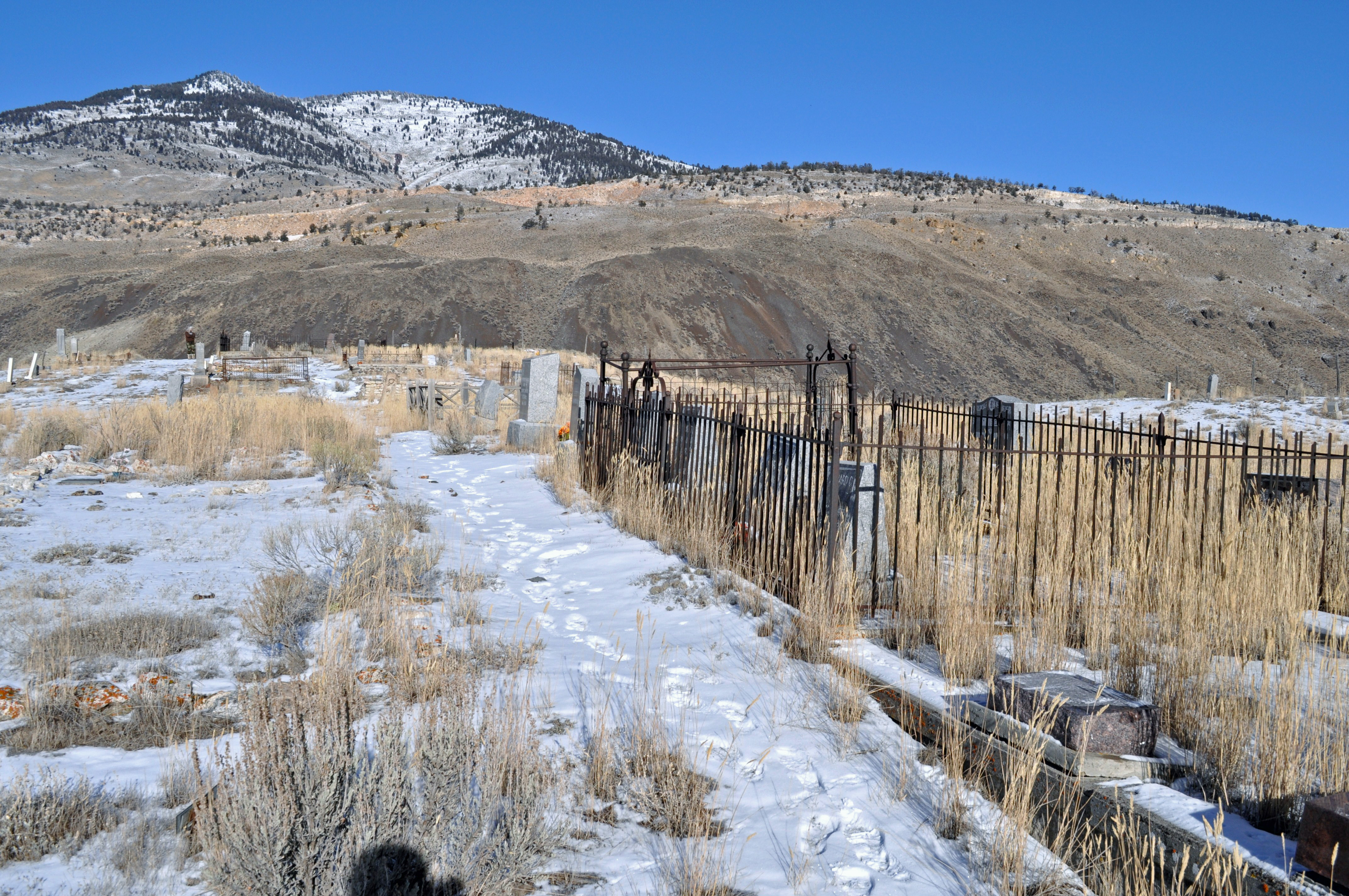
Tinker's Cemetery, just north of town in Yellowstone National Park

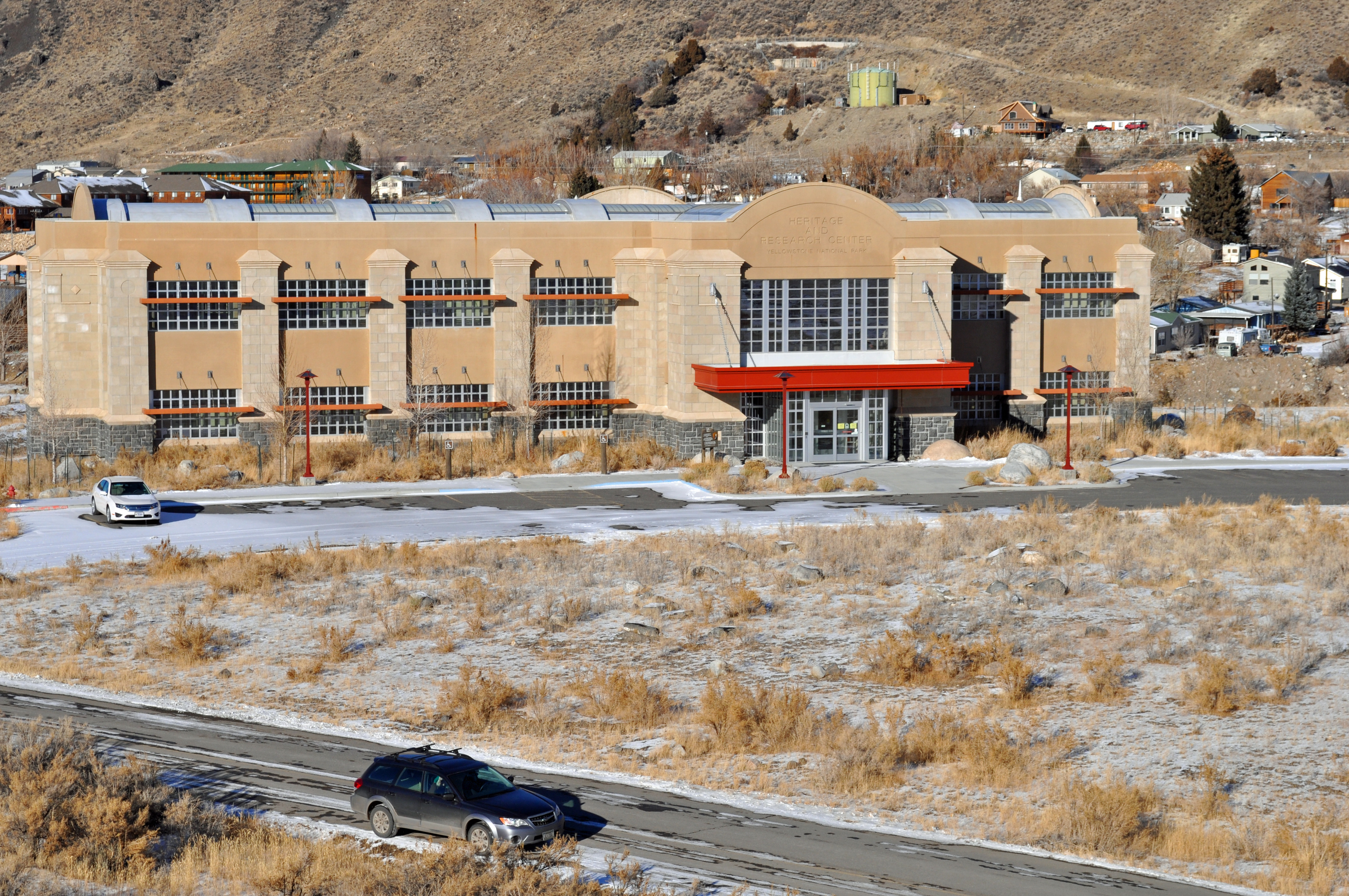
Yellowstone Heritage and Research Center

== See also ==
- Angling in Yellowstone National Park
- The Summit Lighthouse - international headquarters located in Gardiner
- North Entrance Road Historic District
