= KOBB =

KOBB may refer to:

- KOBB (AM), a radio station (1230 AM) licensed to Bozeman, Montana, United States
- KOBB-FM, a radio station (93.7 FM) licensed to Bozeman, Montana, United States
