= KBOZ =

KBOZ may refer to:

- KBOZ (AM), a radio station (1090 AM) licensed to Bozeman, Montana, United States
- KBOZ-FM, a radio station (99.9 FM) licensed to Bozeman, Montana, United States
