= KOBB (AM) =

Frmer simulcast of KOBB-FM Bozeman
- Bozeman, Montana; United States
- Frequency: 1230 kHz
- Branding: 93.7 The River

Programming
- Format: Classic hits

Ownership
- Owner: Cameron Maxwell; (Desert Mountain Broadcasting Licenses LLC)
- Sister stations: KBOZ; KBOZ-FM; KOBB-FM; KOZB

History
- First air date: September 14, 1949 (as KBMN)
- Last air date: 2026
- Former call signs: KBMN (1949–1993); KZLO (1993–1994)

Technical information
- Licensing authority: FCC
- Facility ID: 55677
- Class: C
- Power: 1,000 watts unlimited
- Transmitter coordinates: 45°39′32.7″N 111°03′24.8″W

Links
- Public license information: Public file; LMS
- Webcast: Listen live
- Website: 937theriverfm.com

KOBB (1230 kHz) was an AM radio station licensed to serve Bozeman, Montana, United States. The station's license was held by Desert Mountain Broadcasting Licenses LLC. It operated from 1949 to 2026.

== History ==
=== Beginning ===
The station began regular operations on September 14, 1949, broadcasting to Bozeman, Montana, with 250 watts of power on a frequency of 1230 kHz. The station was assigned the KBMN call sign by the Federal Communications Commission (FCC). Under the ownership of the Penn Engineering Company, KBMN was led by G. Norman Penwell as company president, Gerald E. Tyo as program director, and Jack Penwell as chief engineer.

The original KBMN radio studios were located in a building in the northern part of Bozeman next to its original broadcast tower site on North 7th Avenue. The original tower was torn down in 1992 and the studio building now serves as a small casino.

=== New owners ===
Dale G. Moore acquired Penn Engineering, license holder of KBMN, in June 1958. Moore served as the station's general manager while Harold "Hal" Phelps took over both program director and news director duties at KBMN. In 1962, the FCC granted the station authorization to increase the strength of its daytime signal to 1,000 watts while keeping the nighttime signal at the previous 250 watts.

Penn Engineering sold KBMN outright to William A. Merrick who formed a new company called KBMN, Inc., to serve as the license holder. Merrick served as company president and general manager of KBMN while Ray Styles assumed the program director role. Hal Phelps stayed on as news director and had regained the program director duties by the end of the 1960s.

Throughout the 1970s, KBMN broadcast a mix of middle of the road and contemporary music. The station was acquired by Western Media, Inc., in a transaction that was consummated on September 1, 1975. Len Kehl became the station's general manager while Don Tuggle handled both program director and music director duties.

=== Decade of change ===
In June 1989, Western Media agreed to sell the station to Tony Kehl and general manager Leonard Kehl. The deal was approved by the FCC on June 21, 1989, and the transaction was consummated on November 16, 1989. One year later, in June 1990, Leonard Kehl and Tony Kehl, doing business in partnership as Western Media, announced a deal to sell this station to Robert F. Pipinich and Cathryn L. Pipinich, a joint proprietorship. The deal was approved by the FCC on July 26, 1990, and consummated on the same day.

Just over one year after that, Robert Pipinich and Cathryn Pipinich agreed in July 1991 to transfer the broadcast license for KBMN to Buz Cowdrey's Cowdrey Broadcasting Company. The deal was approved by the FCC on August 20, 1991, and the transaction was consummated on August 27, 1991. This change would also be short-lived as in February 1993 the Cowdrey Broadcasting Company contracted to sell this station to Reier Broadcasting Company, Inc. The deal was approved by the FCC on April 28, 1993, and the transaction was consummated on June 21, 1993.

After more than 43 years as KBMN, the station was assigned the new call sign KZLO by the FCC on March 22, 1993. The change accompanied a format change to adult standards and a branding as an "older oldies" station. The station was assigned the call sign KOBB by the FCC on September 15, 1994. This matched a branding shift to "Bob, Sr." while maintaining the "older oldies" adult standards format. By 2004, the station had shifted to a more modern soft adult contemporary format under the name "Lite 1230" that persisted until 2008.

=== KOBB today ===
In 2008, the station dropped its soft adult contemporary music format to become a full-time affiliate of ESPN Radio, airing a sports talk format. KOBB also aired the syndicated The Dan Patrick Show on weekday afternoons. The station also broadcast play-by-play for the Belgrade Bandits, an American Legion Baseball team, as well as Belgrade High School Panther football and boys and girls' basketball.

On June 3, 2018, KOBB and its sister stations went off the air. Effective December 6, 2019, the licenses for KOBB and its sister stations were involuntary assigned from Reier Broadcasting Company, Inc. to Richard J. Samson, as Receiver. The licenses for these stations were sold to Desert Mountain Broadcasting Licenses LLC for $300,000 in a deal completed on January 31, 2022.

The FCC cancelled the station's license on August 6, 2026.
