= B Street =

B Street or "B" Street is the second of a sequence of alphabetical streets in many cities.

It may refer to:

- Constitution Avenue, Washington, D.C., known originally and also as B Street
- Independence Avenue (Washington, D.C.), also known as B Street South, or South B Street
- B Street Theatre, Sacramento, California
- B Street District, Livingston, Montana, a historic district listed on the National Register of Historic Places

== See also ==
- Avenue B (disambiguation)
