= Oto =

Oto, Ōtō, or OTO may refer to:

== People ==
- Oto (name), including a list of people with the name
- The Otoe tribe (also spelled Oto), a Native American people

== Places ==
- Oto, Spain, a village in the Valle de Broto, in Huesca, Aragon

=== Japan ===
- Ōtō, Fukuoka
- Ōtō, Nara, merged into Gojō in 2005
- Ōtō, Wakayama, merged into Tanabe in 2005

=== United States ===
- Oto, Iowa
- Oto, Missouri
- Oto Reservation, formerly located in southeastern Nebraska
- OTO Homestead and Dude Ranch, Montana

== Other uses ==
- Greta oto, a butterfly of family Nymphalidae
- Ordo Templi Orientis, organization centered on the Law of Thelema
- Oto (album), the third album by Fluke, released in 1995
- OTO Awards, a Slovak awards show
- Otocinclus, a genus of armored catfish
  - Zebra oto
- Oto-Manguean languages, a large family comprising several families of Native American languages
  - Oto-Pamean languages
- Oto Melara, an Italian defense company, formerly known as Odero Terni Orlando
- OTO (Slovenian TV channel), part of media company Pro Plus
- Seibi Oto, a fictional character in the anime series Sky Girls
- Osu! Tatakae! Ouendan!, a 2005 rhythm video game

== See also ==
- Aloadae, Greek mythological figures also known as Otos
- Otoe (disambiguation)
- Otology, a branch of medicine which studies the ear
- Otos, Valencia, Spain
