= Carbella Bridge =

United States historic bridge

- U.S. National Register of Historic Places
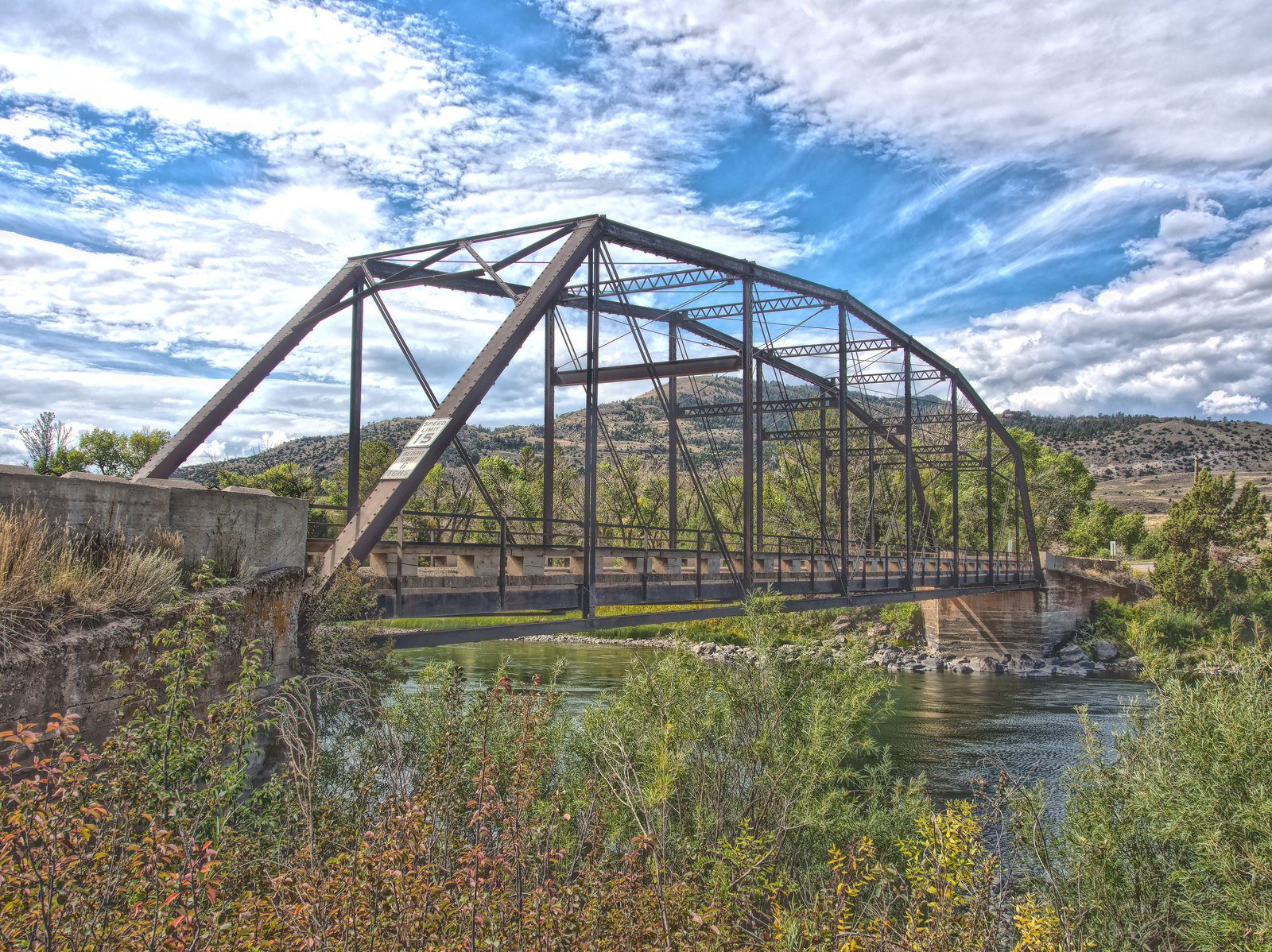
- The Carbella Bridge in 2013

- Location within Montana
- Location: Milepost 0 on Tom Miner Creek Rd., near its junction with U.S. Route 89
- Coordinates: 45.204514°N 110.901558°W
- Built: 1918
- NRHP reference No.: 09001184
- Added to NRHP: January 4, 2010

The Carbella Bridge was a historic bridge near Gardiner, Montana crossing the Yellowstone River in Park County. The bridge carried Tom Miner Creek Road. Constructed in 1918, it was destroyed by the 2022 Montana floods. A replacement bridge opened in 2024.

== See also ==
- National Register of Historic Places listings in Park County, Montana
- List of bridges on the National Register of Historic Places in Montana
