= KBZK =

Television station in Bozeman, Montana

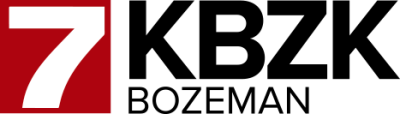
- Bozeman, Montana; United States
- Channels: Digital: 27 (UHF); Virtual: 7
- Branding: KBZK 7; MTN News

Programming
- Network: Montana Television Network
- Affiliations: 7.1: CBS; 7.2: MTN; for others, see § Subchannels

Ownership
- Owner: E. W. Scripps Company; (Scripps Broadcasting Holdings LLC)
- Sister stations: KXLF-TV

History
- First air date: August 31, 1987
- Former call signs: KCTZ (1987–2000); KBZK-TV (2000)
- Former channel numbers: Analog: 7 (VHF, 1987–2009); Digital: 12 (VHF, until 2025)
- Former affiliations: ABC (1987–1993); Fox (1996–2000); UPN (secondary, 1996–2006); ABC (as KSVI satellite, 1993−1996); The CW (7.2, 2006–2023)
- Call sign meaning: "Bozeman"

Technical information
- Licensing authority: FCC
- Facility ID: 33756
- ERP: DTS1: 850 kW; DTS2: 4 kW
- HAAT: DTS1: 220.6 m (724 ft); DTS2: 371.3 m (1,218 ft)
- Transmitter coordinates: DTS1: 45°40′24″N 110°52′5″W; DTS2: 45°41′47.3″N 110°46′7.1″W

Links
- Public license information: Public file; LMS
- Website: kbzk.com

KBZK (channel 7) is a television station in Bozeman, Montana, United States, affiliated with CBS. Owned by the E. W. Scripps Company, it is part of the Montana Television Network (MTN), a statewide network of CBS-affiliated stations. KBZK has its studios on Television Way in Bozeman; its primary transmitter is located atop High Flat, southwest of Four Corners. KBZK shares a media market with the MTN station in Butte, KXLF-TV; the stations share network and syndicated programming but broadcast separate commercials. News programming for the Bozeman and Butte areas originates from KBZK.

Bozeman's first commercial television station, channel 7 has been on the air since 1987, when it debuted as KCTZ. Plans for it had existed for much of the decade, but the unavailability of a network affiliation and a lawsuit by local radio station owners complicated its creation and led to its near-immediate sale to Big Horn Communications, which owned KOUS, the ABC affiliate in Billings.

The station was on the market from 1990 to 1993, when the Evening Post Publishing Company, through its Cordillera Communications division, acquired KCTZ from Big Horn. Because of signal overlap with KXLF-TV, Evening Post had to run KCTZ as a rebroadcaster of the Butte station, shunting Bozeman-area local newscasts and ABC programming to a pair of low-power TV stations in Butte and Bozeman. In 1996, KWYB came on the air as the ABC affiliate for Butte and Bozeman; KCTZ switched to Fox. In 2000, this was reversed, and KCTZ changed to CBS under new KBZK call letters.

== History ==
=== Early years ===
Very high frequency (VHF) channel 7 was originally allocated as the educational channel for Butte. However, plans for educational broadcasting in Montana had failed to get off the ground; the 1975 Montana Legislature scuttled a proposed educational network using the Butte channel 7 allotment. When Robert L. Cooper, a Bozeman native, decided to pursue a television station for the city, he filed with the Federal Communications Commission (FCC) to have channel 7 moved from Butte to Bozeman for commercial use, rejecting the use of a channel on the ultra high frequency (UHF) band as unsuitable. PBS agreed to the idea of adding channel 2 to Butte for educational use there, making it feasible for channel 7 to be reallocated to Bozeman. Several groups objected to the proposal, including Butte station KXLF-TV; Rocky Mountain Public Television; and Governor Thomas Judge, who continued his objection even after learning that plans would keep an educational channel in Butte. KXLF had objected as part of the Montana Television Network (MTN) as a whole; it feared that putting channel 2 at Butte would cause eventual interference issues with KTVQ in Billings on the same channel. The FCC, however, found that a growing Bozeman merited a commercial VHF station and granted Cooper's request in November 1980.

Cooper was among four applicants for the channel once applications closed in September 1981, joined by Edward Johnson, an attorney from Knoxville, Tennessee; Tri-B Broadcasting of Plentywood; and Bee Broadcasting, owned by Benny Bee, a radio DJ from Whitefish. However, a comparative hearing among the four applicants, scheduled for August 1982, was forestalled when merger negotiations began among the group; by this time, Johnson had all but dropped out. Bee Broadcasting owned 90 percent and Tri-B the remainder of the merged entity; Cooper's company, New West Broadcasting, dropped out in exchange for reimbursement of its expenses. The construction permit was issued by the FCC on December 22, 1982.

Bee approached the three major networks seeking affiliation. However, he was denied, first by CBS and later by ABC and NBC. At the time, in the Missoula–Butte market, the existing two stations each had their own network affiliations. The Eagle Communications network (KECI-TV in Missoula and KTVM-TV in Butte) was an NBC–CBS affiliate, while KXLF-TV and KPAX-TV in Missoula had held first call rights to ABC programs while also airing some CBS shows. The networks believed Bozeman was adequately covered. With no network affiliation and no building permits locally for studios, Bee declared in July 1983 that he had "had his fill" of television and wanted to sell the construction permit. However, he reactivated plans for the station in February 1984, this time proposing to operate it as an independent station without network affiliation.

At that time, however, a brief opening appeared in western Montana television affiliations. Later in 1984, KXLF and KPAX, along with the other stations in MTN, became sole CBS affiliates. The Missoula-based Eagle Communications network—which also had a station in Butte—then obtained the ABC affiliation, which precluded it from being available to Bee's proposed Bozeman outlet. In September 1984, Eagle Communications then filed to buy the KCTZ construction permit for $179,000, with a third of the purchase price to be paid in advertising credits with Eagle. However, the application—contingent on the FCC reversing a decision to delete the permit for failure to build—languished at the commission for more than a year. The reason why was that the Reier family, which owned KBOZ-AM-FM, had objected to the sale at the start of 1985. It felt that local interests should have the opportunity to file for the channel and propose their own service. The commission granted the necessary extension in January 1986.

The Eagle acquisition never panned out; in January 1987, the FCC denied the proposed sale, claiming that KTVM-TV was already seen in Bozeman and that a new satellite station would be duplicative. Bee then set out to build the station itself, only to find yet more opposition from the Reiers. Bee claimed that Karen Reier had telephoned him in March 1987 and inquired as to whether Bee would sell the permit; in July, Bee then sued the Reiers for $10 million in damage, claiming their actions had caused potential deals with Eagle and KOUS-TV in Billings to fall through. Meanwhile, construction of the station took place.

At last, KCTZ began broadcasting on August 31, 1987. On its fourth day of operation, the station had to go off the air for five hours because its broadcasts interfered with medical telemetry equipment at Bozeman Deaconess Hospital that also used channel 7 spectrum. Having fought years of battles, however, Bee was thinly capitalized. When Bozeman Cable TV could not include the station on its lineup until after the start of 1988, starving it of much-needed advertising revenue, Bee decided he could hold out no longer and decided to put the station up for sale. He reached a deal with Big Horn Communications, owner of KOUS-TV, though he first had to offer Cooper the ability to buy KCTZ under the terms of his 1982 buyout. The transfer to Big Horn was approved in July 1988 and consummated that November, though the Reiers alleged that Big Horn had taken control without a formal application, leading to proceedings that did not end until 1991.

=== Sale to KXLF ===
Big Horn put KCTZ on the market in 1990, but because of the overlap of contours of KCTZ and the Butte stations, at least one prospective buyer opted not to make a deal. In 1993, the Evening Post Publishing Company, owner of KXLF-TV, acquired the station and received permission to operate it as a satellite of the Butte outlet.

When the sale closed, KXLF's CBS programming and news moved to KCTZ from translator K26DE. "K26" and K43DU in Butte then inherited most of the ABC programming and the Bozeman local news that KCTZ had aired. After KWYB (channel 18) signed on in September 1996 and took the ABC affiliation in the Butte-Bozeman market, K43DU was taken off the air (the repeater was sold to Montana State University in 2001 and now carries Montana PBS); on October 31, after K26DE's ABC affiliation ended in advance of the launch of KWYB repeater K28FB (channel 28, now KWYB-LD), KCTZ became a Fox affiliate, and channel 26 returned to translating KXLF. During this time, channel 7 also took on a secondary affiliation with UPN.

KCTZ dropped Fox on August 21, 2000, saying that the network usually generated lower ratings than the Big Three television networks in smaller markets. At that point, the station once again became a satellite of KXLF-TV (though with separate advertising) and changed its call sign to KBZK-TV (the "-TV" suffix was dropped eight days later). Area cable systems then picked up Foxnet for Fox programming after an unsuccessful attempt to pipe in KHMT from Billings; the Butte–Bozeman market would not get another Fox affiliate until KBTZ (channel 24) signed on in 2003. In Butte, Foxnet was still used by Bresnan Communications until its discontinuation in 2006.

== News operation ==
In April 1988, KCTZ began producing a local 6 p.m. newscast. The news programs aired on weekdays only. When KCTZ was sold to Evening Post, the newscasts moved to K26DE. Local news returned to KCTZ after the switch to Fox in 1996; the station aired a 9 p.m. newscast, replacing its prior 6 and 10 p.m. programs. In April 1999, the 9 p.m. news was moved back to 10 p.m., where its ratings tripled, and a 6 p.m. newscast was reintroduced, citing advertiser demand. However, after channel 7 became KBZK in 2000, the newscasts were canceled and replaced with simulcasts of KXLF's newscasts, retaining a small newsroom in Bozeman to cover stories from the area.

In 2006, KXLF and KBZK began presenting a newscast with an anchor in Butte and another in Bozeman; this was later replaced with separate local newscasts for both areas. When the anchor for the KXLF newscasts opted not to continue with the station, in 2011, Bozeman began producing newscasts for both areas, with KBZK evening anchor Donna Kelley anchoring the Butte programs.

=== Notable former on-air staff ===
- Cara Capuano – sports director and play-by-play announcer, 1998–1999

== Technical information ==
In December 2021, Scripps filed petitions for rulemaking to relocate all five high-power MTN transmitters to the UHF band, including KBZK, for which Scripps proposed operation on channel 27.

=== Subchannels ===
KBZK airs the same subchannels as KXLF-TV:

Subchannels of KXLF-TV and KBZK
Subchannel		Res.	Short name		Programming
KXLF-TV	KBZK	Res.	KXLF-TV	KBZK	Programming
4.1	7.1	1080i	KXLF-TV	KBZK	CBS
4.2	7.2	720p	MTN		MTN
4.3	7.3	480i	Grit	GRIT	Grit
4.4	7.4	480i	ION		Ion
4.5	7.5	480i	CourtTV	COURT	Court TV
4.6	7.6	480i	BUSTED	SCRIPPS	Busted

=== Translators ===
- K26DE-D Bozeman
- K36PI-D Livingston, etc.

Livingston is also served by a second transmitter of KBZK itself, which was approved in 2020 after the main KBZK facility was relocated to High Flat to retain service to Livingston.
