= Oliver and Lucy Bonnell Gothic Arch Roofed Barn =

- U.S. National Register of Historic Places
- Location within Montana Location within the United States
- Location: 247 Shields River Road, E., near Clyde Park, Montana
- Coordinates: 45°47′31″N 110°29′55″W
- Area: less than one acre
- Built: 1922
- Architectural style: Gothic Arch Roofed Barn
- NRHP reference No.: 04000978
- Added to NRHP: September 15, 2004

The Oliver and Lucy Bonnell Gothic Arch Roofed Barn in Park County, Montana, or simply the Bonnell Barn, is a Gothic-arch barn which was built in 1922. It was listed on the National Register of Historic Places in 2004.

It is visible from as far as 15 miles (24 km) away, overlooking the confluence of Falls Creek and the Shields River. It is about 5 miles (8.0 km) southeast of the town Clyde Park.

It was deemed notable as "an excellent and rare example" of a Gothic arched-roof barn, the only one in Park County and one of the only 10 known in Montana.

It has a hay hood.
