= Otoe (disambiguation) =

The Otoe are a Native American people of the Midwestern United States.

Otoe may also refer to:

- Otoe-Missouria Tribe of Indians, a federally recognized tribe in Oklahoma
- Otoe language
- Otoe, Nebraska
- Otoe County, Nebraska
- Otoe City, Nebraska, another name for the railroad town of Minersville, Nebraska
- A name for Taro used in Panama

== See also ==
- Oto (disambiguation)
