= Cara Capuano =

American sports anchor for ESPNU

- Education: University of California, San Diego
- Occupation: ESPN Anchor/Sideline Reporter
- Employer: ESPN

Cara Capuano is an American sports anchor for ESPNU. Before joining ESPNU in 2008, she was a former sports reporter for FSN. She joined Fox Sports Northwest in August 2004, as a reporter and anchor for the Northwest Sports Report and the Detroit Sports Report. She is a Southern Californian and will often go by the nickname "Cappy."

== Other duties ==
- Sideline reporter for Fox Sports NFL games.
- NFL scoreboard in stadium update announcer for the Seattle Seahawks.

== Life before sports ==
In 1995, Capuano graduated from University of California, San Diego with a cell biology and biochemistry degree and summa cum laude honors; she was also a Phi Beta Kappa.

She spent a year working on her doctorate at UCLA before deciding to leave the laboratory and pursue her dream career in sportscasting.

== Sports career ==
Her sports journey started when she worked at both KCOP-TV and FSN in Los Angeles, where she started as a sports assistant.

In 1998, Capuano moved in front of the camera, moving to Bozeman, Montana, to work as the sports director at KCTZ.

Like Colin Cowherd, she spent some time serving as a play-by-play announcer, color analyst and sideline reporter for the matches between Montana State University and the University of Montana in football, volleyball and basketball. She worked for a year as a sports anchor and reporter in Corpus Christi, Texas.

=== ESPN ===
In 2000, she landed a position at ESPN. While in Bristol, Connecticut, Capuano spent her time on the anchor desk between ESPNEWS and SportsCenter. She also returned to the sidelines, calling play-by-play for Division I women's college basketball.
