= Donna Kelley =

American journalist

- Born: 1955 (age 70–71); Havre, Montana, U.S.
- Occupations: Television producer News anchor Reporter
- Notable credit: CNN

Donna J. Kelley (born 1956) is executive producer and evening news anchor for KBZK-TV in Bozeman, Montana, which she joined in 2007 after a six-year retirement from the broadcast news industry.

Prior to returning to the broadcasting field, Kelley worked for CNN as a lead anchor and reporter from 1985 through 2001, working primarily out of the Atlanta headquarters.

Kelley had previously worked in Spokane, Washington and Helena, Montana before joining CNN.

Known for her poised on-air performance, Kelley has won many broadcasting awards including two Cable Ace awards and an Emmy.

She was previously married to fellow CNN anchor Patrick Emory.

Kelley is a Bozeman native and a graduate of Bozeman High School.
