= Avenue B =

Avenue B may refer to:

- Avenue B (album), by Iggy Pop
- Avenue B (Brooklyn), in Canarsie, Brooklyn, New York City
- Avenue B (Manhattan), in the Alphabet City area of East Village, Manhattan, New York City
- Avenue B Productions, a film production company run by Julie Paratian and Caroline Bonmarchand

== See also ==
- B Street (disambiguation)
