= Gardiner Airport =

Airport in Park County, Montana, United States

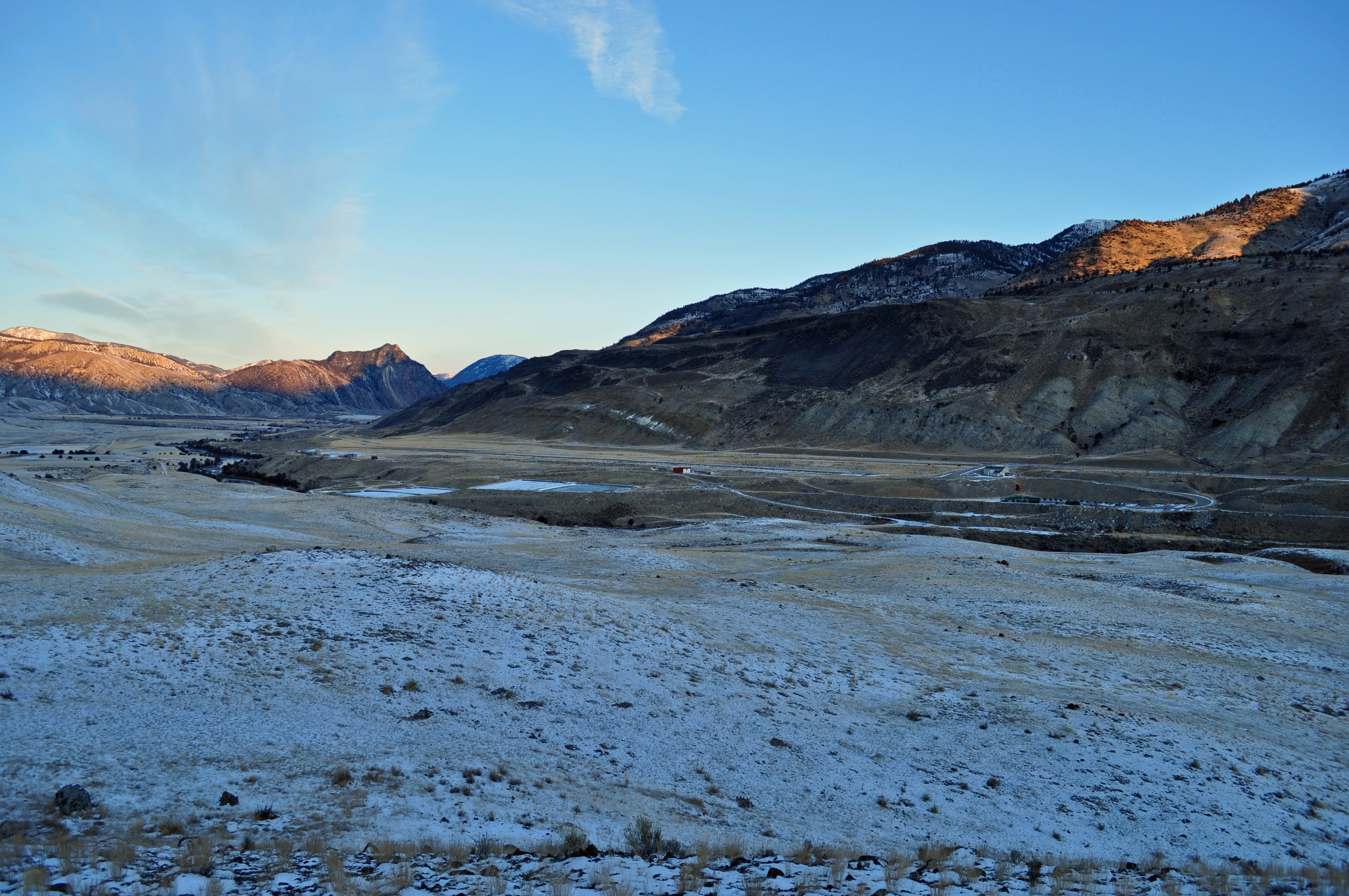
- IATA: none; ICAO: none; FAA LID: 29S

Summary
- Airport type: Public
- Owner: City of Gardiner & Park County
- Serves: Gardiner, Montana
- Elevation AMSL: 5,286 ft (1,611 m)
- Coordinates: 45°03′00″N 110°44′48″W
- Interactive map of Gardiner Airport

Runways
| Direction | Length | | Surface |
| Direction | ft | m | Surface |
|---|---|---|---|
| 10/28 | 3,200 | 975 | Asphalt |

Statistics (2004)
- Aircraft operations: 8,600
- Based aircraft: 9
- Source: Federal Aviation Administration

Gardiner Airport (FAA LID: 29S) is a public use airport located two nautical miles (3.7 km) northwest of the central business district of Gardiner, a city in Park County, Montana, United States. The airport is owned by the city and county.

== Facilities and aircraft ==
Gardiner Airport covers an area of 38 acres (15 ha) at an elevation of 5,286 feet (1,611 m) above mean sea level. It has one asphalt paved runway designated 10/28 which measures 3,200 by 55 feet (975 x 17 m).

For the 12-month period ending August 31, 2004, the airport had 8,600 aircraft operations, an average of 23 per day: 93% general aviation and 7% air taxi. At that time there were 9 aircraft based at this airport, all single-engine.

== See also ==
- List of airports in Montana
