= Rolfson House =

Historic house in Montana, United States

- U.S. National Register of Historic Places
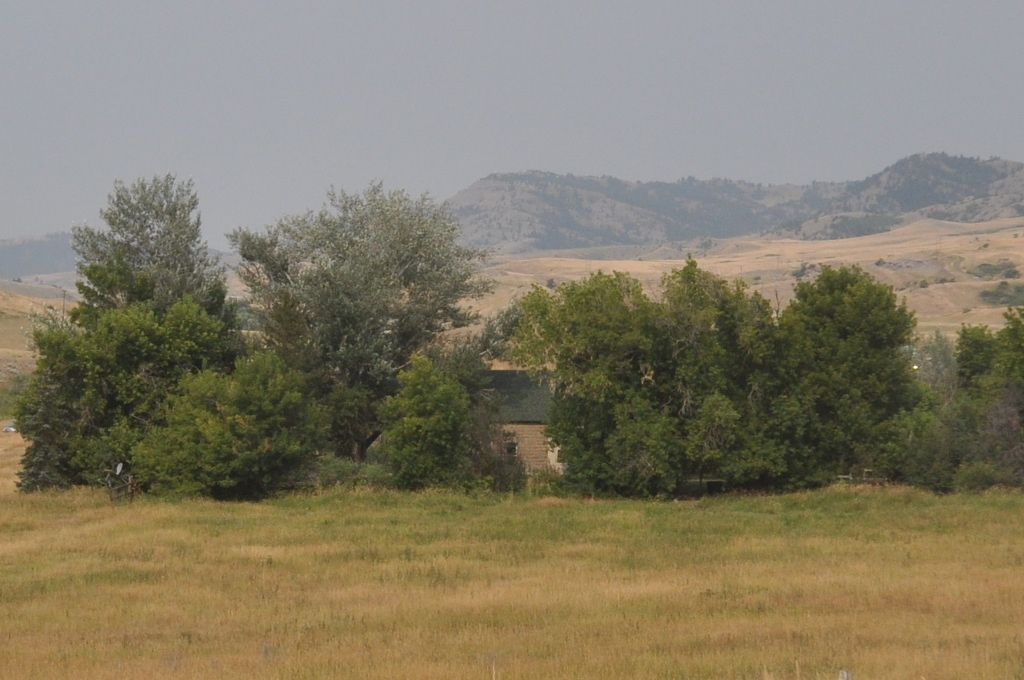

- Location within Montana Location within the United States
- Location: West of Livingston, Montana on Bozeman Road
- Coordinates: 45°39′42″N 110°40′17″W
- Area: less than one acre
- Built: 1900
- Built by: Rolfson, Martin
- MPS: Livingston MRA
- NRHP reference No.: 79001418
- Added to NRHP: September 5, 1979

The Rolfson House near Livingston, Montana was built in 1900. It was listed on the National Register of Historic Places in 1979.

It is a tall one-and-a-half-story stone house, built by stonemason Martin Rolfson. Its walls are built of squared sandstone blocks about 9 by 12 by 36 inches (0.23 m × 0.30 m × 0.91 m) in size, from a quarry on the property.
