= 2022 Montana floods =

Natural disaster in the United States

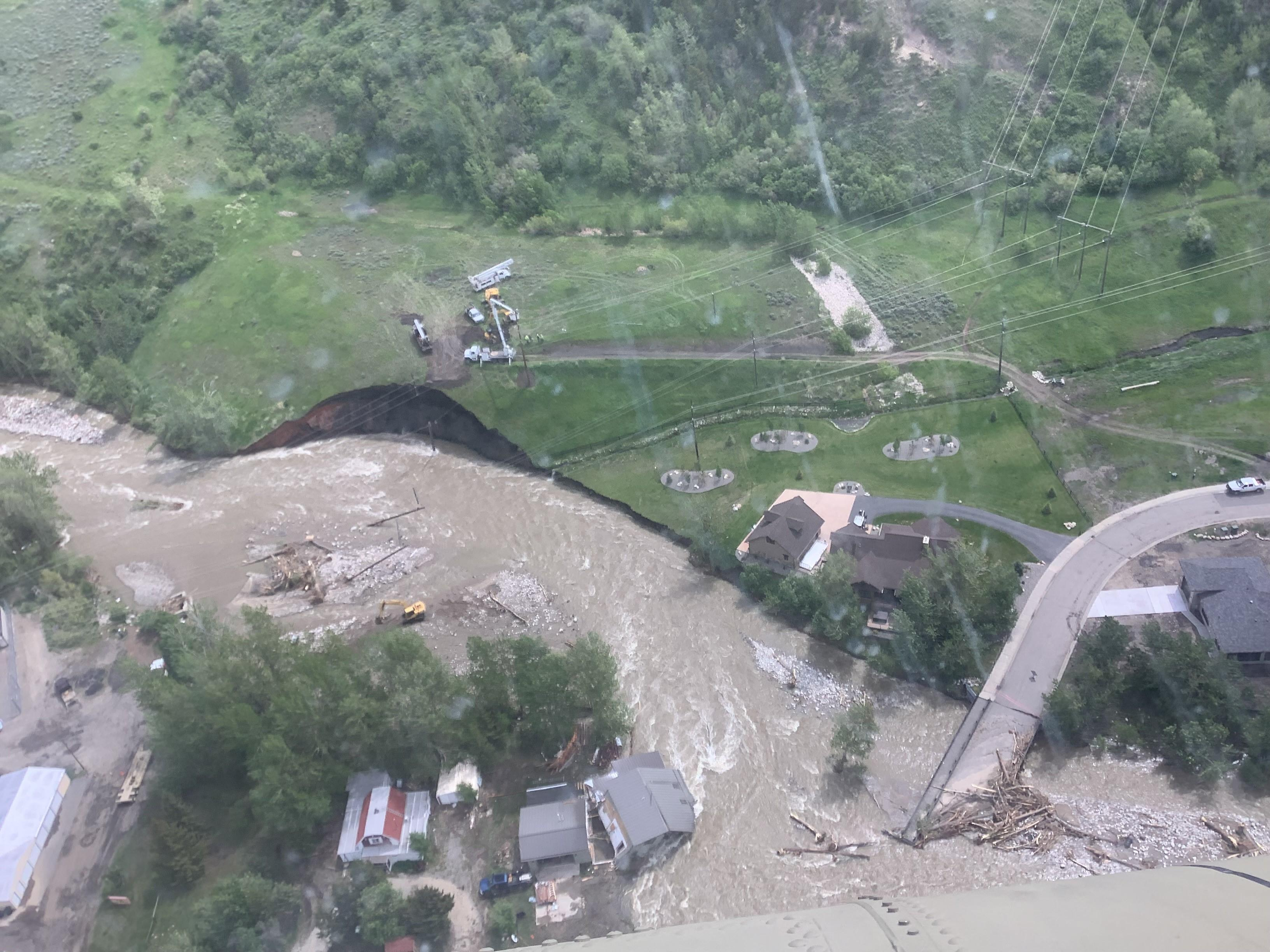
- Flood damage in Red Lodge on June 14
- Date: June 13, 2022 – June 24, 2022
- Location: Montana, Yellowstone National Park
- Deaths: 1
- Property damage: $29 million

In June 2022, the U.S. state of Montana was hit by heavy, damaging floods in multiple major watersheds including the Yellowstone River. Heavy rain and melting snow over the weekend June 10–13 caused large areas of Yellowstone National Park to be evacuated. On June 14, the water plant in Billings was temporarily shut down. Many houses were damaged as a result, and a number of roads and bridges were destroyed by floodwaters.

The National Weather Service said that heavy rain on top of melting mountain snow pushed the Yellowstone, Stillwater and Clarks Fork rivers to record levels and triggered rock and mudslides. The Montana National Guard said that 87 people had been airlifted by helicopter to safety. Cities and towns affected include Gardiner, Fromberg, Livingston, Red Lodge. On Monday, June 13 Governor Greg Gianforte verbally authorized Lt Governor Kristen Juras to declare a state of emergency. Governor Gianforte was vacationing in Italy, and returned Thursday, June 16. On June 16, the Federal Emergency Management Agency announced that federal disaster assistance has been made available to the state of Montana.

On June 18, it was reported that heavier flooding was expected to reach Billings and other areas in Eastern Montana. The flooding reportedly caused at least $29 million in damage.

== Multiple watersheds impacted ==
=== Yellowstone River headwaters ===
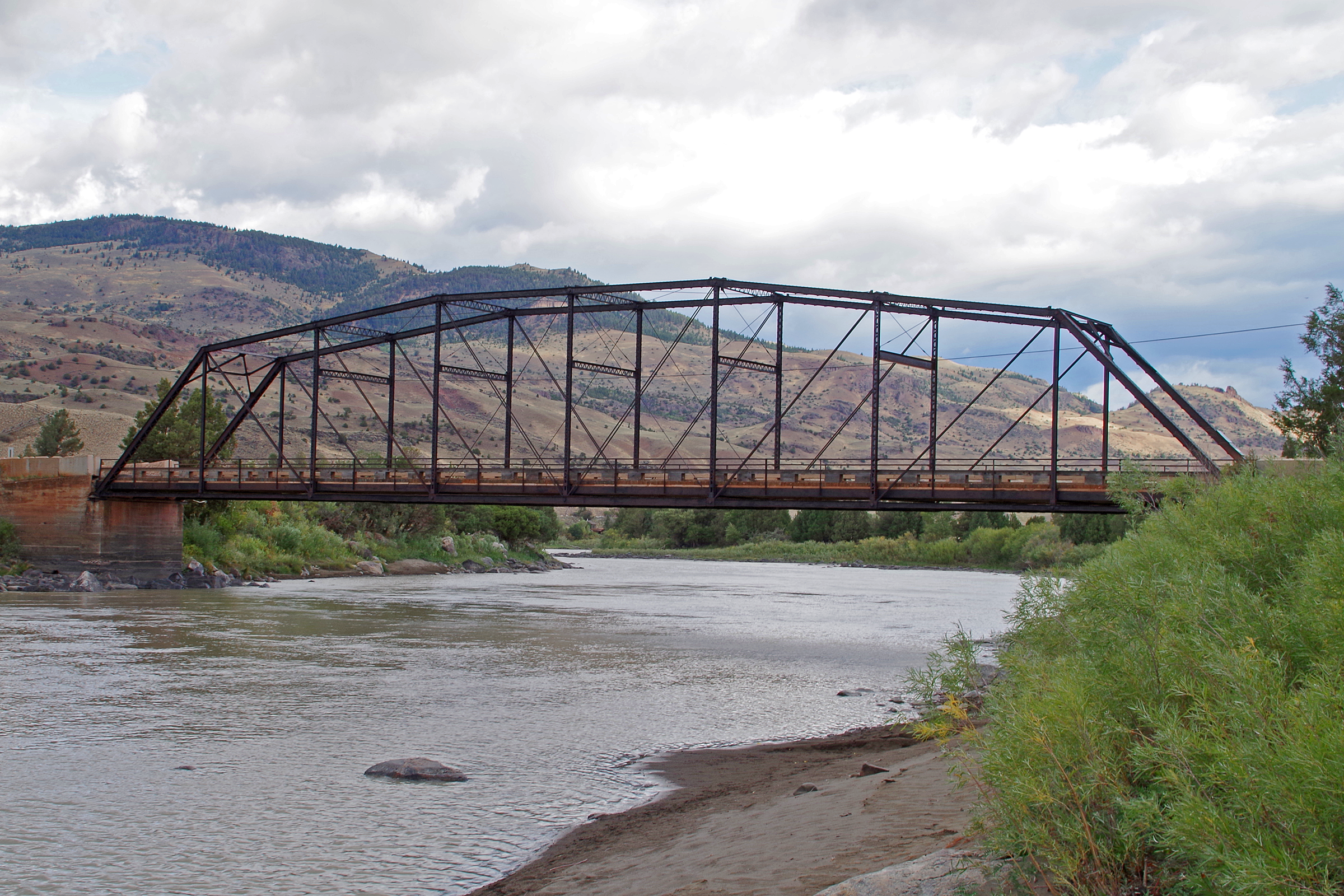
Carbella Bridge (1918–2022)

The Carbella Bridge, which crossed the Yellowstone River was destroyed.

=== Stillwater River ===
Homes near Absarokee were threatened when the Stillwater River flooded, eroding the riverbanks. Extensive flooding of the river also affected Nye and Fishtail.

=== Clarks Fork of the Yellowstone ===
On June 13, Rock Creek, a tributary of the Clarks Fork of the Yellowstone, flooded Red Lodge, Montana damaging roads, bridges and buildings. The flood caused severe damage to infrastructure on the north side of the park including the north entrance road, wastewater systems, facilities, and trails.

=== Missouri River headwaters ===
Fishing Access Sites along the Madison River near Ennis, Montana and several roads near tributary creeks were closed due to flooding in the Madison River watershed. The Ruby River in the Jefferson River watershed experienced flooding, closing roads above and below Ruby Reservoir near Alder, Montana.

=== Flathead River ===
A 43-year-old man was killed in a rafting incident on the Flathead River on June 21. High water levels and debris have reportedly made the river dangerous.

=== Yellowstone National Park ===
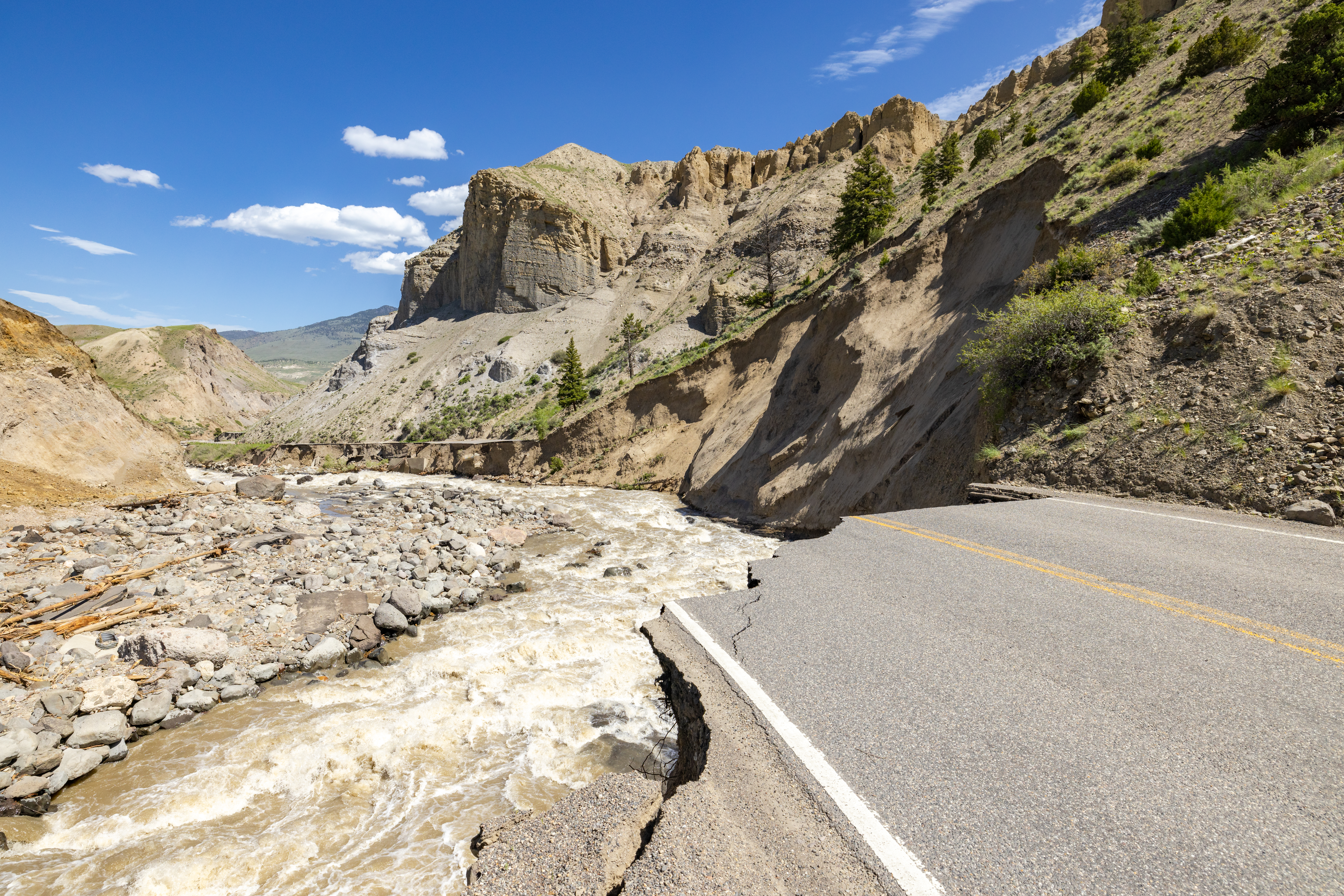
North Entrance Road washout along Gardner River

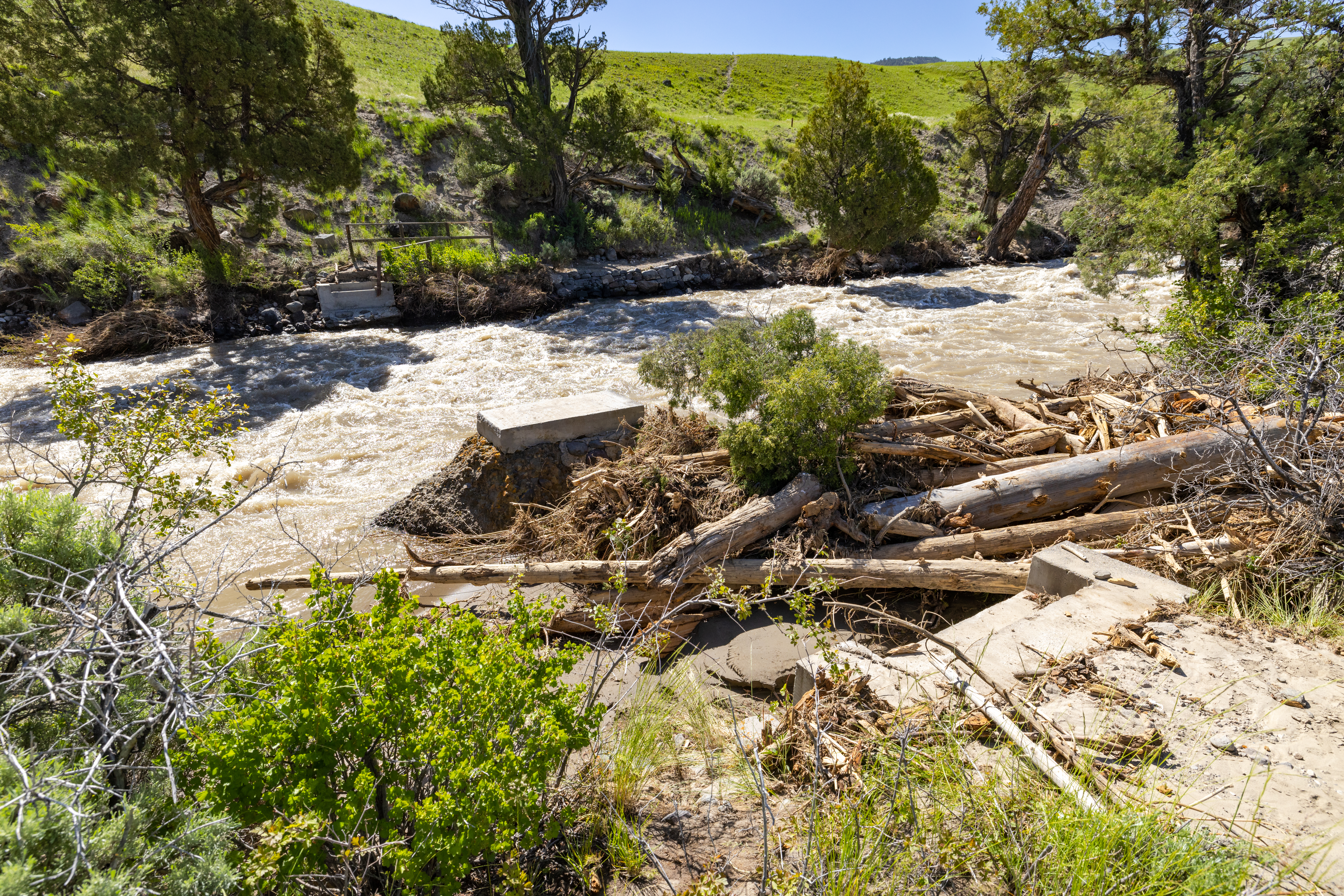
Rescue Creek Bridge washed away on Gardner River

On June 14, 2022, Yellowstone National Park shut down all of its entrances, and began evacuation of approximately 10,000 visitors currently in the park. The National Park Service had stated that many parts, including the North part of Yellowstone, would be closed for "a substantial length of time". Flood damage, mostly road washouts and mudslides, were extensive on the Yellowstone River headwaters of Soda Butte Creek, Lamar River and Gardner River. Multiple road washouts in the Gardner River canyon made the park inaccessible from the Northern Entrance road, including park administrative, maintenance and concessionaire facilities in Gardiner.
