= Trowbridge Dairy =

- U.S. National Register of Historic Places
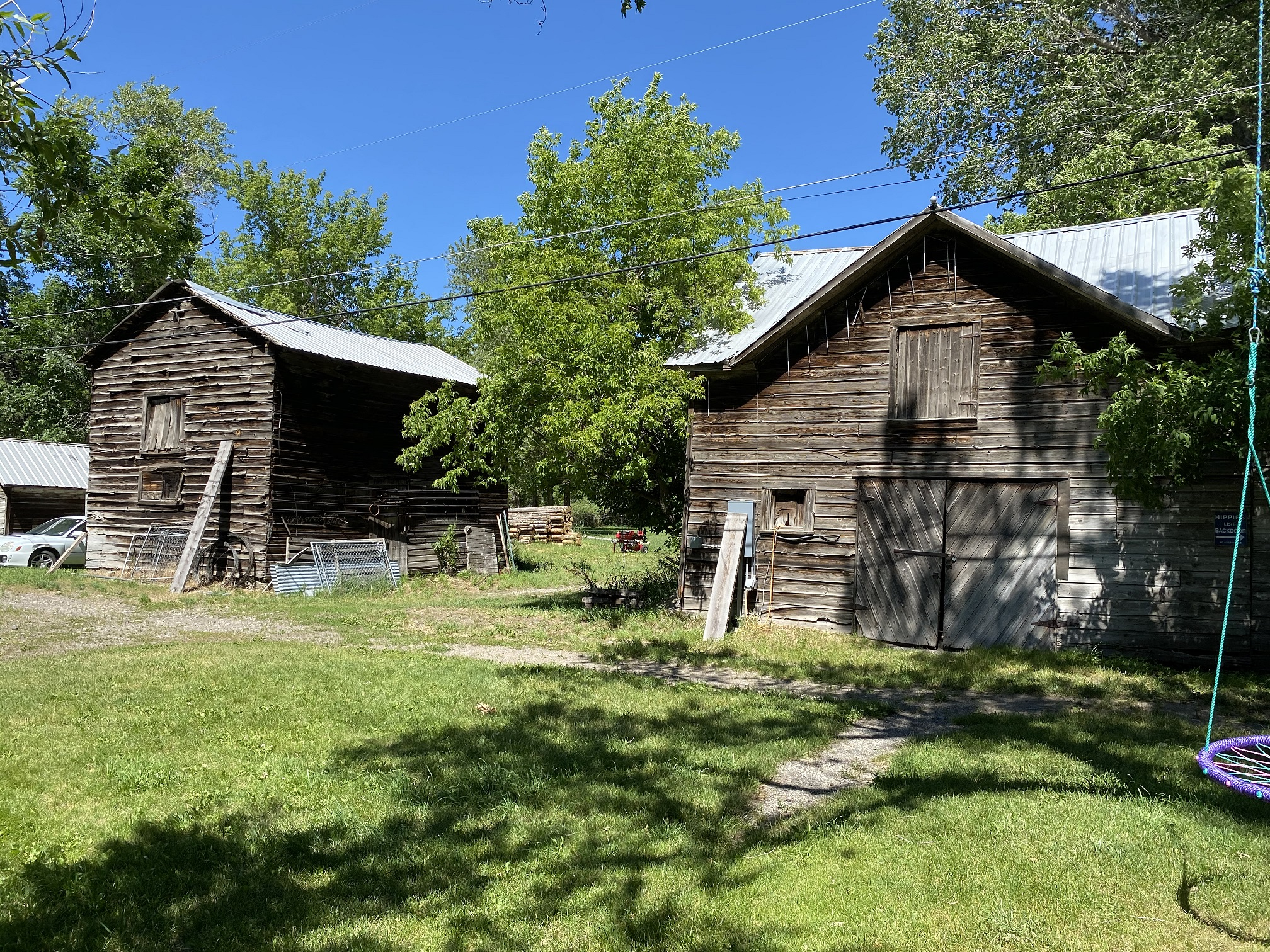

- Location within Montana Location within the United States
- Location: 207 S. M St. Livingston, Montana
- Coordinates: 45°40′4″N 110°32′40″W
- Area: 1.5 acres (0.61 ha)
- Built: 1906
- Built by: Wolcott, Henry J.
- MPS: Livingston MRA
- NRHP reference No.: 79001419
- Added to NRHP: September 5, 1979

The Trowbridge Dairy is a property with four buildings which was listed on the National Register of Historic Places in 1979.

The listing included four contributing buildings: a main house, two barns, and a shed. The main house was built by contractor Henry J. Wolcott in 1906. J. Frank Trowbridge bought the property in 1909 and built a large barn to house three stallion horses; he turned to dairying by 1919 and operated the property as a local dairy until driven out of business in the Depression, selling the property in 1933.
