= OTO Homestead and Dude Ranch =

- U.S. National Register of Historic Places
- U.S. Historic district
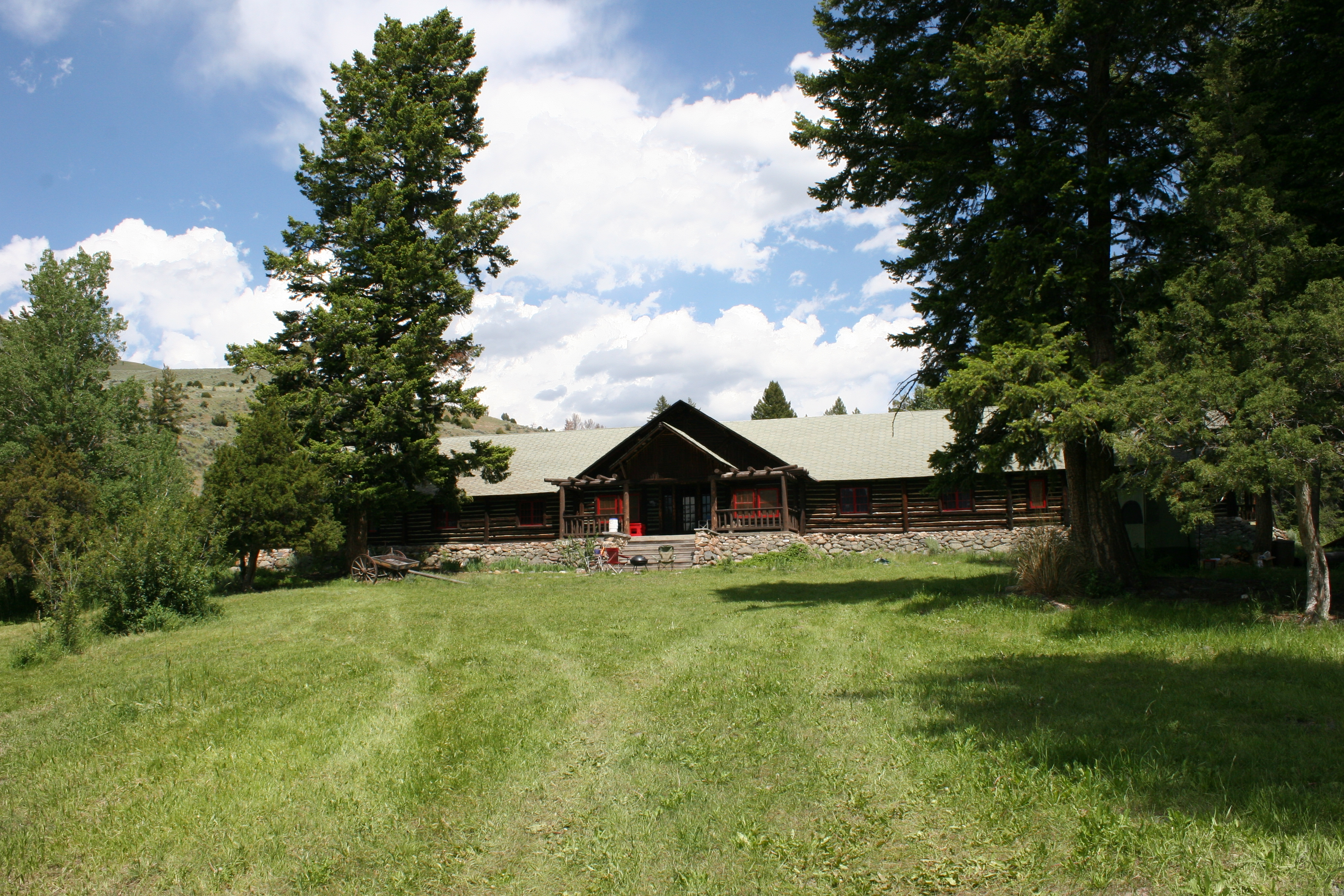
- The lodge at the OTO ranch (completed 1921)

- Location within Montana Location within the United States
- Location: Park County, Montana
- Nearest city: Gardiner, Montana
- Coordinates: 45°08′54.36″N 110°46′56.31″W
- NRHP reference No.: 99000054
- Added to NRHP: 4 October 2004

The OTO Homestead and Dude Ranch was the first dude ranch in the US state of Montana. It was started by James Norris (Dick) Randall and his wife Dora after they purchased squatters rights on a small cabin along Cedar Creek in the Absaroka Range. The original cabin had a dirt floor cabin with a sod roof. Randall courted wealthy eastern clients (the Dudes) and by 1912 they came to the OTO to experience a "genuine" western ranch lifestyle. The property grew to meet the needs of guests and by the 1920s included an impressive lodge (1921), cabins, barns, post office, and outbuildings. Notable guests included Theodore Roosevelt and Marcellus Hartley Dodge, Jr.

The Randalls sold the OTO in 1934 to Chan Libby (a former guest). In 1939 the OTO closed its dude ranching operations permanently. After its 1939 closing the property was sold to John Paul and Jessie Shields, who owned for more than 30 years and worked it as cattle and horse ranch. Two of their granddaughters would come and spend summers with them and go to the OTO, Gayle (Shields) Terry and Nikki Shields. They sold it to the Elk Foundation in 1989. The 3,265 acre (1,321 hectare) property was eventually acquired by the Rocky Mountain Elk Foundation, who donated it (1991) to the United States Forest Service (Gallatin National Forest District). In 2004 the site was listed on the National Register of Historic Places, and buildings are currently undergoing renovations with labor provided by volunteer groups including Passport in Time, Elderhostel and Amizade. The site continues to provide habitat for large wildlife.
