= Clyde Park, Montana =

- Town
- Nickname: Sunnyside
- Location of Clyde Park, Montana
- Coordinates: 45°53′02″N 110°36′21″W
- Country: United States
- State: Montana
- County: Park

Area
  - Total: 0.37 sq mi (0.97 km^{2})
  - Land: 0.37 sq mi (0.97 km^{2})
  - Water: 0 sq mi (0.00 km^{2})
- Elevation: 4,853 ft (1,479 m)

Population (2020)
  - Total: 332
  - Density: 889.0/sq mi (343.24/km^{2})
- Time zone: UTC-7 (Mountain (MST))
  - Summer (DST): UTC-6 (MDT)
- ZIP code: 59018
- Area code: 406
- FIPS code: 30-15550
- GNIS feature ID: 2413217
- Website: clydeparkmt.net

Clyde Park is a town in Park County, Montana, United States. The population was 332 at the 2020 census. Originally known as Sunnyside, the town was renamed in the 1890s.

== History ==
Founded in the 1870s, the present-day site of Clyde Park was founded as Sunnyside by Texas cattlemen who were attracted to the area for grazing their herds. The post office in Sunnyside was established in 1887. In 1887, a post office called Clyde Park was established at the historic Harvey and Tregloan Ranch, where John Harvey owned a Clydesdale horse which he had imported from England in the late 1890s. A stagecoach from Livingston, Montana, reached the town in the 1880s.

In 1901, the Clyde Park post office was merged with Sunnyside, and the town was renamed Clyde Park. However, the reason is unclear. Another source suggests that the town was called Clyde Park in honor of Clyde Durand, a local rancher; or for Harvey's Clydesdale horse. The Harvey and Tregloan Ranch eventually was sold to Robert Shiplet. The present-day Shiplet Ranch has historic barns that date to the 1870s or 80s, and its livestock brand is notably the shape of Montana.

In 1909 the Northern Pacific Railway established a branch line to the town, and in 1912 it incorporated as Clyde Park. That year it was reported to have a bank, a newspaper, a creamery, and an elevator. A major fire burned much of the town in 1919.

Today, Clyde Park is the home of the G Bar M Ranch, a 3,200-acre dude ranch that opened in 1934. The ranch itself dates back to 1900. The town is also home to the Old Settler's Days, an annual celebration of pioneer history. It includes an art show and parade.

== Geography ==
The town is in the Shields River valley. Area farmers have won world prizes for raising grain.

According to the United States Census Bureau, the town has an area of 0.32 square miles (0.83 km^{2}), all land.

=== Climate ===
This climatic region is typified by large seasonal temperature differences, with warm to hot (and often humid) summers and cold (sometimes severely cold) winters. According to the Köppen Climate Classification system, Clyde Park has a humid continental climate, abbreviated "Dfb" on climate maps.

== Demographics ==
Historical population
Census	Pop.	Note	%±
1920	352		—
1930	302		−14.2%
1940	216		−28.5%
1950	280		29.6%
1960	253		−9.6%
1970	244		−3.6%
1980	283		16.0%
1990	282		−0.4%
2000	310		9.9%
2010	288		−7.1%
2020	332		15.3%
U.S. Decennial Census

=== 2010 census ===
As of the census of 2010, there were 288 people, 136 households, and 80 families residing in the town. The population density was 900.0 inhabitants per square mile (347.5/km^{2}). There were 153 housing units at an average density of 478.1 per square mile (184.6/km^{2}). The racial makeup of the town was 98.3% White, 0.7% Native American, 0.3% Asian, and 0.7% from other races. Hispanic or Latino people of any race were 1.0% of the population.

There were 136 households, of which 25.7% had children under the age of 18 living with them, 47.8% were married couples living together, 9.6% had a female householder with no husband present, 1.5% had a male householder with no wife present, and 41.2% were non-families. 36.0% of all households were made up of individuals, and 14.7% had someone living alone who was 65 years of age or older. The average household size was 2.12 and the average family size was 2.79.

The median age in the town was 45.8 years. 21.2% of residents were under the age of 18; 4.8% were between the ages of 18 and 24; 22.6% were from 25 to 44; 36.5% were from 45 to 64; and 14.9% were 65 years of age or older. The gender makeup of the town was 50.7% male and 49.3% female.

=== 2000 census ===
As of the census of 2000, there were 310 people, including 137 households, and 83 families residing in the town. The population density was 908.9 inhabitants per square mile (350.9/km^{2}). There were 157 housing units at an average density of 460.3 per square mile (177.7/km^{2}). The racial makeup of the town was 100.00% White. Hispanic or Latino people of any race were 0.32% of the population.

There were 137 households, out of which 27.7% had children under the age of 18 living with them, 53.3% were married couples living together, 3.6% had a female householder with no husband present, and 38.7% were non-families. 35.8% of all households were made up of individuals, and 18.2% had someone living alone who was 65 years of age or older. The average household size was 2.26 and the average family size was 2.96.

In the town, the population was spread out, with 23.5% under the age of 18, 6.8% from 18 to 24, 23.5% from 25 to 44, 30.0% from 45 to 64, and 16.1% who were 65 years of age or older. The median age was 43 years. For every 100 females there were 105.3 males. For every 100 females age 18 and over, there were 111.6 males.

The median income for a household in the town was $28,194, and the median income for a family was $35,278. Males had a median income of $27,500 versus $20,556 for females. The per capita income for the town was $15,646. About 2.2% of families and 10.0% of the population were below the poverty line, including 11.5% of those under age 18 and 11.8% of those age 65 or over.

== Education ==
Shields Valley Public Schools has two components: Shields Valley Elementary School District and Shields Valley High School District. The municipality is in both districts.

Shields Valley Public Schools educates students from kindergarten through 12th grade. The elementary school is in Wilsall. The Jr/Sr High School is located in Clyde Park. The Shields Valley High School team name is the Rebels.
