= B Street District =

Historic district in Montana, United States

- U.S. National Register of Historic Places
- U.S. Historic district
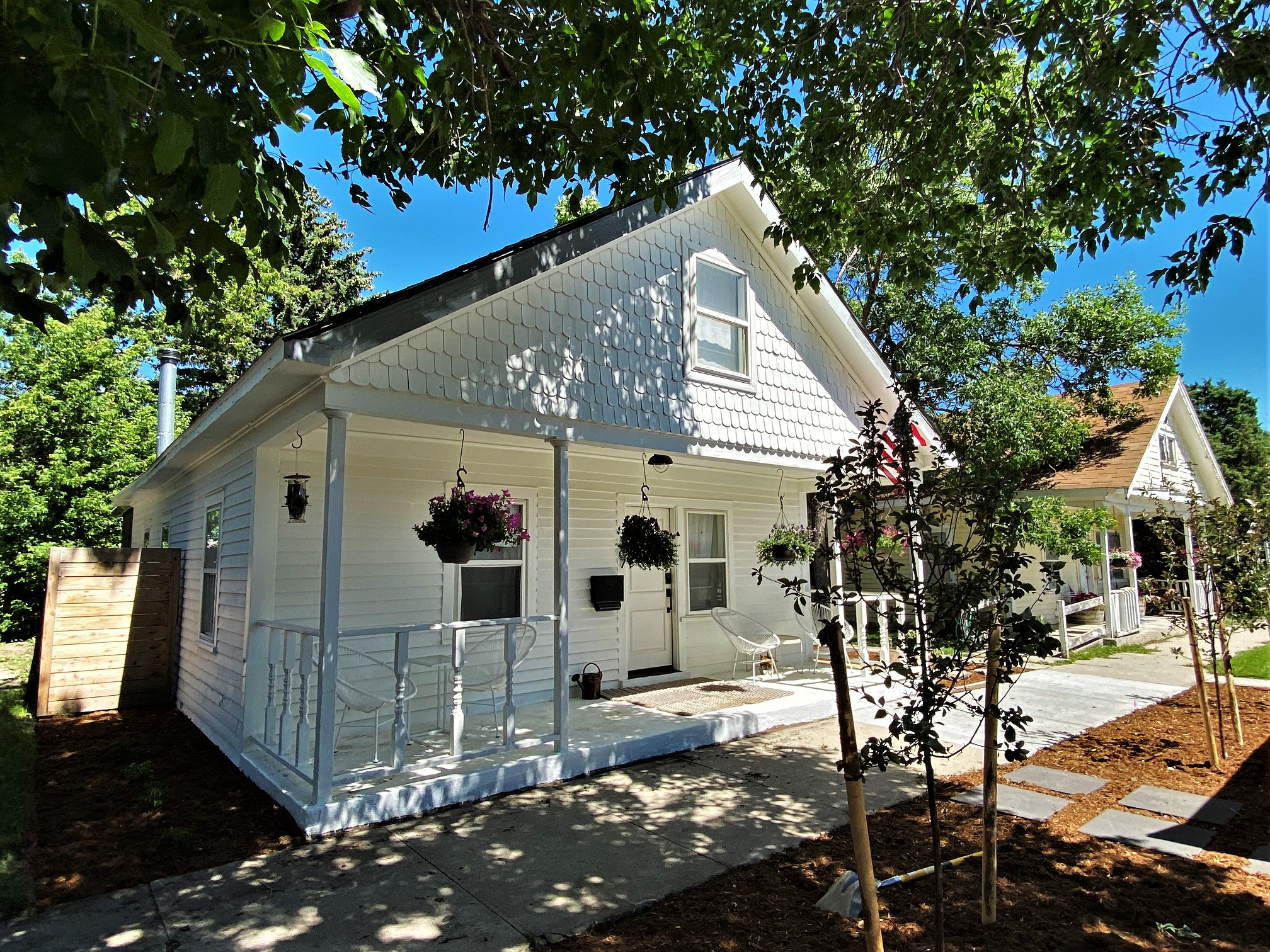

- Location within Montana Location within the United States
- Location: B St. Livingston, Montana
- Coordinates: 45°39′35″N 110°33′18″W
- Area: 0.5 acres (0.20 ha)
- Built: 1901
- MPS: Livingston MRA
- NRHP reference No.: 79001408
- Added to NRHP: September 5, 1979

B Street District is a 0.5 acres (0.20 ha) historic district in Livingston, Montana which was listed on the National Register of Historic Places in 1979.

It included four small (approximately 20 by 40 feet (6.1 m × 12.2 m) one-story houses built in 1901.
