= KOZB =

- Livingston, Montana; United States
- Broadcast area: Bozeman, Montana
- Frequency: 97.5 MHz
- Branding: 97.5 The Zone

Programming
- Format: Active rock

Ownership
- Owner: Cameron Maxwell; (Desert Mountain Broadcasting Licenses LLC)
- Sister stations: KBOZ; KBOZ-FM; KOBB-FM

History
- First air date: December 1977 (as KYBS)
- Former call signs: KYBS (1977–1993); KATH (1993); KBOZ-FM (1993–1995); KPKX (1995–2004)

Technical information
- Licensing authority: FCC
- Facility ID: 16777
- Class: C1
- ERP: 100,000 watts
- HAAT: 75 meters (246 ft)
- Transmitter coordinates: 45°39′26″N 110°58′22″W

Links
- Public license information: Public file; LMS
- Website: thezone975.com

KOZB (97.5 FM) is a radio station licensed to serve Livingston, Montana, United States. The station's license is held by Desert Mountain Broadcasting Licenses LLC.

Its transmitter site is east of Bozeman, on Bozeman Trail Road. KBOZ-FM, KOZB, and KOBB-FM all have construction permits to move to a new shared transmitter site on top of Green Mountain, along I-90 east of Bozeman.

== History ==
Logo as "Rock 97.5"

The station signed on in December 1977 as KYBS. It changed its call sign to KATH in April 1993; on November 25, 1993, it became KBOZ-FM. On August 1, 1995, the station switched its call sign to KPKX, and on August 3, 2004, it became KOZB.

On June 1, 2018, KOZB and its sister stations went off the air. Effective December 6, 2019, the licenses for KOZB and its sister stations were involuntary assigned from Reier Broadcasting Company, Inc. to Richard J. Samson, as Receiver. The licenses for these stations were sold to Desert Mountain Broadcasting Licenses LLC for $300,000 in a deal completed on January 31, 2022. The station came back on the air as active rock 97.5 the Zone.
