= KOBB-FM =

- Bozeman, Montana; United States
- Frequency: 93.7 MHz
- Branding: 93.7 The River

Programming
- Format: Classic hits

Ownership
- Owner: Cameron Maxwell; (Desert Mountain Broadcasting Licenses LLC)
- Sister stations: KBOZ; KBOZ-FM; KOZB

History
- First air date: November 1, 1980
- Former call signs: KBZN (1978–1983); KBOZ-FM (1983–1993); KATH (1993–1997)

Technical information
- Licensing authority: FCC
- Facility ID: 16776
- Class: C1
- ERP: 51,000 watts
- HAAT: −39 meters (−128 ft)
- Transmitter coordinates: 45°41′35″N 110°58′50″W

Links
- Public license information: Public file; LMS
- Webcast: Listen live
- Website: 937theriverfm.com

KOBB-FM (93.7 MHz) is a radio station licensed to serve Bozeman, Montana, United States. The station's license is held by Desert Mountain Broadcasting Licenses LLC.

KOBB-FM shares a transmitter site with KBOZ (AM) and KBOZ-FM, east of the studios on Johnson Road and Fowler Lane. KBOZ-FM, KOZB, and KOBB-FM all have construction permits to move to a new shared transmitter site on top of Green Mountain, along I-90 east of Bozeman.

Logo as an oldies station

In 1984, it aired a Top-40 music format, competing against KCDQ. The station was assigned the KOBB-FM call sign by the Federal Communications Commission on April 11, 1997. The station previously carried a country music format as "The Kat". Later, it began airing an oldies music format. The station derived most of its programming from Scott Shannon's The True Oldies Channel.

On June 3, 2018, KOBB-FM and its sister stations went off the air. Effective December 6, 2019, the licenses for KOBB-FM and its sister stations were involuntary assigned from Reier Broadcasting Company to Richard J. Samson, as Receiver. The licenses for these stations were sold to Desert Mountain Broadcasting Licenses LLC for $300,000 in a deal completed on January 31, 2022.

== Translators ==
KOBB-FM programming is also carried on a broadcast translator station to extend or improve the coverage area of the primary station.

Call sign	Frequency	City of license	FID	ERP (W)	Class	FCC info
K280CS	103.9 FM	Mammoth Hot Springs, Wyoming	39763	44	D	LMS
