= KBOZ-FM =

- Bozeman, Montana; United States
- Frequency: 99.9 MHz
- Branding: 99.9 K-Bear

Programming
- Format: Oldies
- Affiliations: ABC News Radio

Ownership
- Owner: Cameron Maxwell; (Desert Mountain Broadcasting Licenses LLC)
- Sister stations: KBOZ; KOBB-FM; KOZB

History
- First air date: April 1993 (as KZLO-FM)
- Former call signs: KZLO (1992–1993); KZLO-FM (1993–2004)

Technical information
- Licensing authority: FCC
- Facility ID: 55676
- Class: C1
- ERP: 19,000 watts
- HAAT: −56 meters (−184 ft)
- Transmitter coordinates: 45°41′34″N 110°58′57″W

Links
- Public license information: Public file; LMS
- Webcast: Listen live
- Website: 999kbear.com

KBOZ-FM (99.9 MHz, "99.9 K-Bear") is a radio station licensed to Bozeman, Montana, United States. The station serves the Bozeman area. The station's license is held by Desert Mountain Broadcasting Licenses LLC.

KBOZ-FM shares a transmitter site with KBOZ and KOBB-FM, east of the studios on Johnson Road and Fowler Lane. KBOZ-FM, KOZB, and KOBB-FM all have construction permits to move to a new shared transmitter site on top of Green Mountain, along I-90 east of Bozeman.

== History ==
The station was assigned the call sign KZLO on December 17, 1992; an "-FM" suffix was added on March 22, 1993, allowing KBMN (1230 AM) to become KZLO. KZLO-FM signed on in April 1993 as a country music station branded as "The Fox". On May 21, 2004, the station became KBOZ-FM.

On June 1, 2018, KBOZ-FM and its sister stations went off the air. Effective December 6, 2019, the licenses for KBOZ-FM and its sister stations were involuntary assigned from Reier Broadcasting Company, Inc. to Richard J. Samson, as Receiver. The licenses for these stations were sold to Desert Mountain Broadcasting Licenses LLC for $300,000 in a deal completed on January 31, 2022.
