= KBOZ (AM) =

- Bozeman, Montana; United States
- Frequency: 1090 kHz
- Branding: 1090 KBOZ

Programming
- Format: Classic country; ag news

Ownership
- Owner: Cameron Maxwell; (Desert Mountain Broadcasting Licenses LLC)
- Sister stations: KBOZ-FM; KOBB-FM; KOZB

History
- First air date: December 19, 1975
- Call sign meaning: Bozeman

Technical information
- Licensing authority: FCC
- Facility ID: 16775
- Class: B
- Power: 5,000 watts
- Transmitter coordinates: 45°36′58″N 111°5′16″W

Links
- Public license information: Public file; LMS
- Website: 1090kboz.com

KBOZ (1090 kHz) is an AM radio station licensed to Bozeman, Montana, United States. The station serves the greater Bozeman area. The station's license is held by Desert Mountain Broadcasting Licenses LLC.

KBOZ shares a transmitter site with KBOZ-FM and KOBB-FM, east of the studios on Johnson Road and Fowler Lane. KBOZ-FM, KOZB, and KOBB-FM all have construction permits to move to a new shared transmitter site on top of Green Mountain, along I-90 east of Bozeman.

Logo as a talk radio station

On June 1, 2018, KBOZ and its sister stations went off the air. Effective December 6, 2019, KBOZ and its sister stations' licenses were involuntarily assigned from Reier Broadcasting Company, Inc. to Richard J. Samson, as Receiver. The licenses for these stations were sold to Desert Mountain Broadcasting Licenses LLC for $300,000 in a deal completed on January 31, 2022.
