= Union Station =

A union station is a railroad station used by more than one railroad company.

Union Station, Union Terminal, Union Depot, or Union Passenger Station may refer to:

== Railway stations ==
=== Australia ===
- Union railway station, Melbourne, Victoria

=== Canada ===
- Union Station (Toronto), Ontario
  - Union station (TTC), subway station in Toronto, Ontario
- Ottawa Union Station, Ontario, 1912-1966, today the Senate of Canada Building
- Union Station (Winnipeg), Manitoba
- Union Station (Regina), Saskatchewan, now the Casino Regina

=== United States ===
==== Alabama ====
- Montgomery Union Station

==== Arizona ====
- Union Station (Phoenix, Arizona)

==== Arkansas ====
- Brinkley Union Station, in the Lick Skillet Railroad Work Station Historic District
- Little Rock Union Station
- Union Station (Pine Bluff, Arkansas), also known as the Pine Bluff-Jefferson County Historical Museum
- Texarkana Union Station

==== California ====
- Los Angeles Union Station
- Santa Fe Depot (San Diego)
- Sacramento Union Traction Depot

==== Colorado ====
- Union Depot (Pueblo, Colorado)
- Denver Union Station

==== Connecticut ====
- Hartford Union Station
- New London Union Station
- Canaan Union Depot
- Union Station, Danbury, now the Danbury Railway Museum
- Union Station (New Haven)
- Waterbury Union Station

==== Florida ====
- Jacksonville Union Station
- Ocala Union Station
- Tampa Union Station

==== Georgia ====
- Union Station (Albany, Georgia)
- Atlanta Union Station (1930)
- Augusta Union Station
- Union Station (Columbus, Georgia)
- Savannah Union Station

==== Illinois ====
- Chicago Union Station
- Englewood Union Station
- Joliet Union Station
- Peoria Union Station
- Springfield Union Station (Illinois)
- Watseka Union Depot
- Wells Street Station, or Galena and Chicago Union Railroad Depot, Chicago

==== Indiana ====
- Indianapolis Union Station
- Muncie Union Station
- Union Station (Gary, Indiana)
- Union Station (South Bend, Indiana)
- Terre Haute Union Station

==== Iowa ====
- Cedar Rapids Union Station
- Iowa Falls Union Depot
- Union Station (Davenport, Iowa)

==== Kansas ====
- Union Station (Wichita, Kansas)

==== Kentucky ====
- Union Station (Louisville)
- Union Station (Owensboro, Kentucky)
- Lexington Union Station

==== Louisiana ====
- New Orleans Union Passenger Terminal
- New Orleans Union Station
- Shreveport Union Station

==== Maine ====
- Bangor Union Station
- Union Station (Portland, Maine)

==== Maryland ====
- Pennsylvania Station (Baltimore), originally called Union Station
- Union Station (Salisbury, Maryland)

==== Massachusetts ====
- North Station, Boston
- South Station (originally called South Union Station), Boston
- Union Station (Clinton, Massachusetts)
- Union Station (Northampton, Massachusetts)
- Union Station (Palmer, Massachusetts)
- Union Station, two Pittsfield predecessors to Joseph Scelsi Intermodal Transportation Center
- Springfield Union Station (Massachusetts)
- Union Station, predecessor to South Sudbury station
- Union Station (Walpole, Massachusetts)
- West Concord station, formerly called Union Station
- Union Station (Worcester, Massachusetts)

==== Michigan ====
- Durand Union Station
- Fort Street Union Depot, Detroit
- Grand Rapids Union Station
- Holly Union Depot, Oakland County
- Union Depot (Lansing, Michigan)
- Union Depot (Muskegon, Michigan)

==== Minnesota ====
- Duluth Depot
- Saint Paul Union Depot

==== Mississippi ====
- Godbold Transportation Center, Brookhaven
- Gulfport station
- Union Station (Jackson, Mississippi)
- Union Station (Meridian, Mississippi)
  - Union Station Historic District, Meridian

==== Missouri ====
- Joplin Union Depot
- St. Louis Union Station
- Kansas City Union Station
- Union Station (MetroLink), St. Louis

==== Nebraska ====
- Union Station (Omaha)

==== New Hampshire ====
- Union Station (Manchester, New Hampshire)

==== New Jersey ====
- Phillipsburg Union Station
- Union station (NJ Transit), Union

==== New Mexico ====
- Tucumcari station

==== New York ====
- Union Station (Albany, New York)
- Union Station (Chatham, New York)
- Union Station (Kingston, New York)
- Union Station (Lockport, New York)
- Union Station (Troy, New York)
- Union Station (Utica, New York)

==== North Carolina ====
- Apex Union Depot
- Goldsboro Union Station
- Selma Union Depot
- Raleigh Union Station
- Union Station (Wilmington, North Carolina)
- Union Station (Winston-Salem, North Carolina)

==== Ohio ====
- Akron Union Station
- Berea Union Depot
- Cincinnati Union Terminal
- Cleveland Union Depot
- Union Station (Columbus, Ohio)
- Dayton Union Station
- Marion Union Station
- Martin Luther King Jr. Plaza (Toledo)
- Tower City Center (formerly Cleveland Union Terminal)

==== Oklahoma ====
- Union Station (Oklahoma City)
- Tulsa Union Depot

==== Oregon ====
- Portland Union Station

==== Pennsylvania ====
- Bethlehem Union Station
- Connellsville Union Passenger Depot
- Union Station (Erie, Pennsylvania)
- Union Station (Pittsburgh)

==== Rhode Island ====
- Union Station (Providence)

==== South Carolina ====
- North Charleston station
- Union Station (Columbia, South Carolina)
- Spartanburg station

==== Tennessee ====
- Memphis Union Station
- Union Station (Chattanooga)
- Union Station (Columbia, Tennessee)
- Union Station, former station in Jackson
- Union Station (Nashville)

==== Texas ====
- Galveston Railroad Museum (formerly Union Station), Galveston
- Union Depot (El Paso)
- Dallas Union Station
- Gulf, Colorado and Santa Fe Railroad Passenger Station, Fort Worth
- Union Station (Houston)
- Texarkana Union Station

==== Utah ====
- Salt Lake City Union Pacific Depot
- Union Station (Ogden, Utah)

==== Vermont ====
- White River Junction station, a union station
- Union Station (Brattleboro, Vermont)
- Union Station (Burlington, Vermont)

==== Virginia ====
- Alexandria Union Station
- Broad Street Station (Richmond), or Union Station
- Charlottesville Union Station
- Union Station (Petersburg)

==== Washington ====
- Centralia station (Washington)
- Union Station (Seattle)
- Union Station (Tacoma, Washington)
- Union Station/South 19th Street station, Tacoma

==== Washington, D.C. ====
- Washington Union Station
- Union Station (Washington Metro)
- Union Station (DC Streetcar)

==== Wisconsin ====
- Ashland Union Station
- Everett Street Depot
- Superior Union Station

=== United Arab Emirates ===
- Union (Dubai Metro), on the red and green lines

== Art, entertainment, and media ==
- Union Station (band), a country music/bluegrass band
- Union Depot (film), 1932
- Union Station (film), 1950
- Union Station (mural), a public artwork in Columbus, Ohio, US

== Communities and districts ==
- Union Station, Denver, Colorado, a downtown neighborhood
- Union Station, Ohio, an unincorporated community
- Union Station (electoral district), in Winnipeg, Manitoba

== Other uses ==
- Old Union Depot Hotel, Tampa, Florida
- Union Station (shopping mall), a former mall in Union City, Georgia
- Union Station School, a historic building in Paducah, Kentucky

== See also ==
- Union Square station (disambiguation)
- Union Street station (disambiguation)
- Union Pacific Depot (disambiguation), including variations on the name
- Central Station (disambiguation)
