= Union Square =

Union Square may refer to:

== Places ==
=== United States ===
- Union Square, Baltimore, Maryland
- Union Square, Boston, Massachusetts
  - Union Square station (Allston), a former Massachusetts Bay Transportation Authority station on the Green Line A branch
- Union Square (Greensboro), North Carolina
- Union Square Park, adjacent to Springfield Union Station, Springfield, Illinois
- Union Square, Manhattan, New York
  - 14th Street–Union Square station, a New York City Subway station on the BMT Broadway Line, the BMT Canarsie Line and the IRT Lexington Avenue Line
- Union Square (Salt Lake City), Utah
- Union Square, San Francisco, California
  - Union Square/Market Street station, a Muni Metro station on the Central Subway of the T Third Street line
- Union Square (Seattle), Washington
- Union Square (Somerville), Massachusetts
  - Union Square station (Somerville), a Massachusetts Bay Transportation Authority station on the Green Line D branch
- Union Square (Washington, D.C.)

=== Other places ===
- Union Square, a shopping centre in Brunswick West, Victoria, Australia
- Union Square, Nova Scotia, Canada
- Union Square (Hong Kong), in Kowloon to the west of Kwun Chung and the northwest of Tsim Sha Tsui
- Union Square, Lima, Peru, since renamed after Ramón Castilla
- Union Square Aberdeen, Scotland, a leisure/retail/transport hub in Aberdeen
- Union Square Saigon, Vietnam, a complex building of shopping mall and hotel
- Union of Lublin Square, Warsaw, Poland
- Piața Unirii (disambiguation), "Union Square" in Romanian

== Other ==
- Union Square (TV series), an NBC comedy series that aired during the 1997–1998 season
- Union Square (film), a 2011 film
- Union Square, a 1988 book by author Meredith Tax
- "Union Square", a song by Tom Waits from Rain Dogs
- Union Square & Co., publishing company formerly Sterling Publishing
