= Toronto Union Station (disambiguation) =

Toronto Union Station may refer to:

- Union Station (Toronto), a major intermodal transit hub in Toronto, Ontario, Canada
  - Toronto Union Station (1858), Toronto's first Union Station
  - Toronto Union Station (1873), Toronto's second Union Station
- Union station (TTC), a Toronto subway station adjacent to the current Union Station
- Union Station Bus Terminal

== See also ==
- Union station, explaining the generic term
- Union Station (disambiguation)
