= Gardiner station =

Railway station in Gardiner, Montana, US

Gardiner
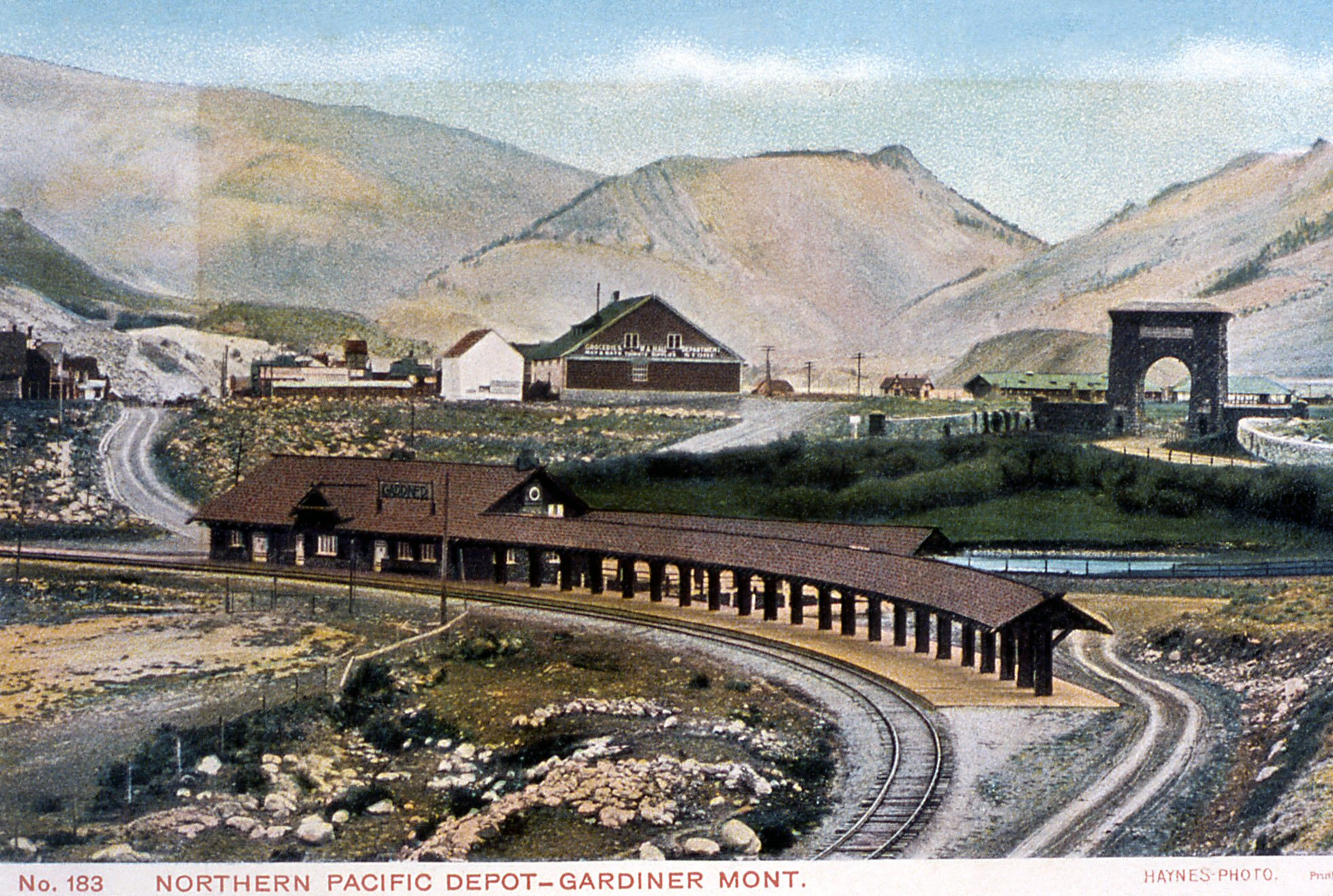
- A postcard of the station, with the town of Gardiner and the Roosevelt Arch in the background

General information
- Coordinates: 45.031635°N 110.712709°W
- System: Northern Pacific Railway station
- Owner: Northern Pacific Railway
- Line: Yellowstone Park Branch
- Platforms: 1 side platform
- Tracks: 1 (on a balloon loop)

Construction
- Structure type: At-grade

History
- Opened: 1903
- Closed: 1954

Services
Preceding station	Northern Pacific Railway	Following station
Terminus	Yellowstone National Park Line	Corwin Springs toward Livingston
Location

Gardiner station was a railway station in Gardiner, Montana, serving the Northern Pacific Railway. Gardiner was on the southern terminus of a branch line from Livingston and is at the northern border of Yellowstone National Park. Passengers would be shuttled to/from the park via stagecoach. The station was designed by Robert Reamer in the rustic style. Passenger service eventually diminished from Gardiner, and the station was torn down in 1954.

== Site description ==
The station was designed by architect Robert Reamer in 1903, who also designed the Old Faithful Inn at Yellowstone. These structures were both designed in the rustic style, and this style was set as a precedent for other national park buildings. The walls were made out of logs, with the foundation set with stone. The red and black Northern Pacific yin-yang symbol was used throughout the building, including on the stations' floor and doors. The exterior of the station featured a curving platform, with the rail track on one side and space for carriages on one side. A pond was also created between the station and the Roosevelt Arch.

== History ==
The Yellowstone Park branch line was first completed in 1883 by the Northern Pacific Railway. The line ended at Cinnabar station, 3 miles (4.8 km) north of Gardiner. The line was marketed as the first railroad line to a national park. The line was not completed to Gardiner due to a disagreement between the railroad and the owner of a land claim in Gardiner. The line was extended to Gardiner in June 1902. Cinnabar was abandoned and became a ghost town after operations shifted to Gardiner.

The initial track to Gardiner was not built with turning capabilities and trains had to backtrack to Cinnabar to reverse. President Theodore Roosevelt visited the town via the railroad in 1903, but the track and depot were not fully operational yet. The nearby Roosevelt Arch had its cornerstone placed by Roosevelt on April 24, 1903. A new turning track along with a permanent depot opened later in 1903. Throughout the majority of the station's life, one train in each direction was operated to/from Livingston, 51 miles (82 km) north. During the peak summer months, through Pullman sleeping car service was available from Chicago and Seattle via the North Coast Limited. A peak of "more than 17,000" annual passengers used the branch line in 1925.

With the introduction of the automobile and bus, rail service to Gardiner declined significantly. In 1915, the Northern Pacific (plus other railroads at other gates) brought in 44,477 people compared to 7,418 by car. This greatly decreased to 26,845 rail passengers out of 194,771 total visitors in 1930. The last scheduled passenger service ran in 1948. Special charter trains operated until 1955, and the last service to Gardiner was a troop of Girl Scouts. The depot was demolished in 1954, and replaced by a joint building serving the city's water department, public library, and sheriff's department. Gardiner High School was also built on the former railroad land. A new library designed in the style of the old station was considered has been proposed under the 2015 "Gardiner Gateway Project", although the current status of the project is unknown. The track between Livingston and Gardiner was abandoned by Northern Pacific successor Burlington Northern in 1981.
