= C.B. Power Bungalow =

- U.S. National Register of Historic Places
- Location within Montana Location within the United States
- Location: Lewis and Clark County, Montana in vicinity of Wolf Creek, Montana, 1.2 miles (1.9 km) north of Interstate 15 and 1 mile (1.6 km) west of U.S. Route 287
- Coordinates: 47.04618°N 112.06776°W
- Area: 28 acres (11 ha)
- Built: 1911
- Architect: Robert C. Reamer
- Architectural style: Bungalow/Craftsman
- NRHP reference No.: 95000380
- Added to NRHP: April 7, 1995

The C.B. Power Bungalow, also known as The Bungalow Bed and Breakfast, in Lewis and Clark County, Montana in the vicinity of Wolf Creek, Montana was built in 1911. It was listed on the National Register of Historic Places in 1995 for its architecture. It was opened as a bed and breakfast in 1993.

According to its National Register nomination, it "is an excellent example of Adirondack/Craftsman style architecture", and it "is a masterful example of Craftsman/Bungalow style architecture at its best. Designed by Robert C. Reamer, the C.B. Power Bungalow, outbuildings and setting embody the rustic ideals which Reamer helped to popularize for early 20th century building. Although his original sketches are not located at this time, historic correspondence and the bungalow itself attest to his involvement in conceptualizing the design. The strength of the Bungalow's rustic design links it clearly with Reamer's other work, for which he drew upon naturalistic inspiration. Set against a dramatic rise of granite bluffs, this environment not only influences choices of materials, it becomes an integral component of the overall design."

The 28 acres (11 ha) listing includes four contributing buildings besides the main house: a library/caretaker's residence, a garage, an ice house, and a dog house. The original stable is gone, destroyed by a fire; a horse barn is non-contributing. The patterns of the main house's design "are carried over into the design of the C.B. Power Bungalow outbuildings, particularly the library and the garage. These buildings are small gems of Craftsman design, overshadowed by the Bungalow's commanding design, yet they capture on a small scale the same qualities of architecture."

The property also includes a contributing structure, and a contributing site.

It was designed by architect Robert C. Reamer. Supervision of its construction was delegated to architect William E. Donovan of Great Falls, Montana.
