= Duck River Valley Narrow Gauge Railway =

Railway line

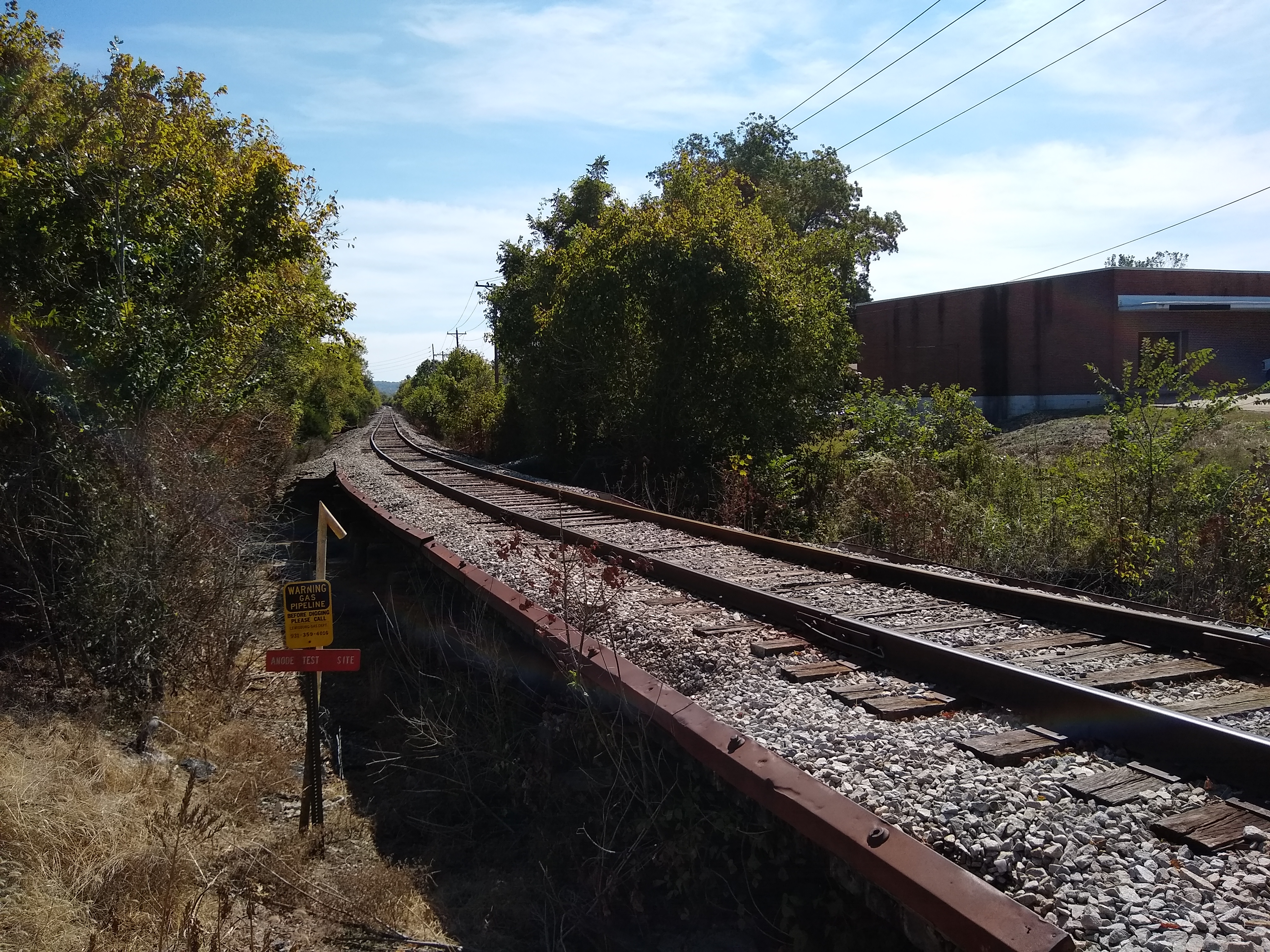
- A spur of the line remains in operation in Lewisburg

Overview
- Termini: Columbia, Tennessee; Fayetteville, Tennessee

History
- Opened: 1877
- Completed: 1879
- Closed: 1961

Technical
- Line length: 77 km (48 mi)
- Number of tracks: Single
- Track gauge: 3 ft (914 mm)

The Duck River Valley Narrow Gauge Railway was a narrow gauge railway that connected the cities of Columbia, Lewisburg, and Fayetteville, Tennessee along the Duck River.

Chartered on November 4, 1870, construction began from Columbia southward, with the line to Lewisburg opening in 1877. The railway fell into financial difficulty, and was leased to the Nashville, Chattanooga and St. Louis Railway in 1879. It assumed full control of the line in 1888, and converted it to standard gauge. Union Station in Columbia was built to serve the line. Both it and the Belfast Railroad Depot are on the National Register of Historic Places.

The line between Columbia and Lewisburg closed in 1945 and between Lewisburg and Petersburg in 1961. Only a spur serving factories in Lewisburg remains. Parts of the route were used to build Tennessee State Route 50 in Maury and Marshall counties.

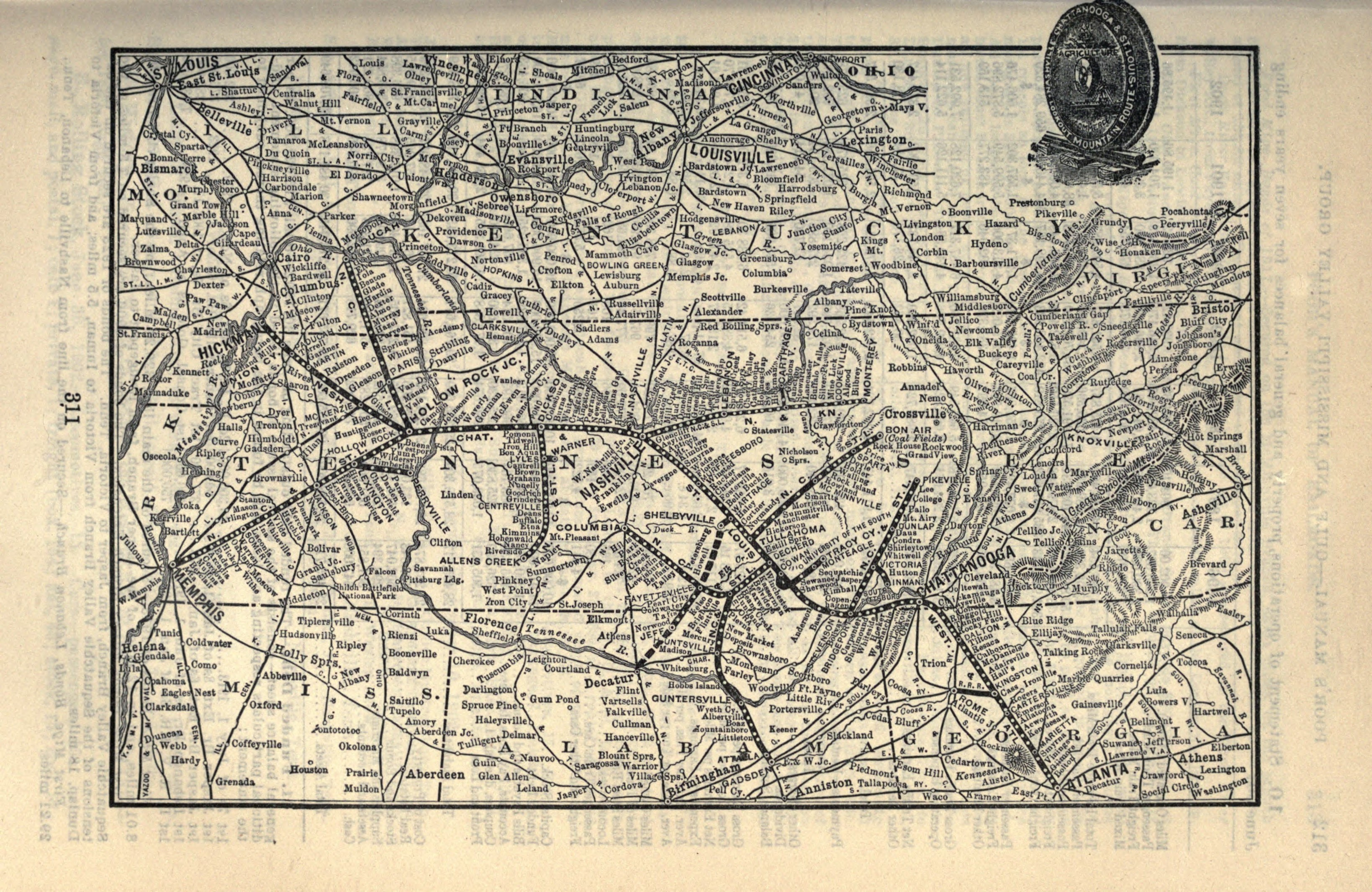
A 1903 map of the NC&StL, showing the route between Columbia and Fayetteville

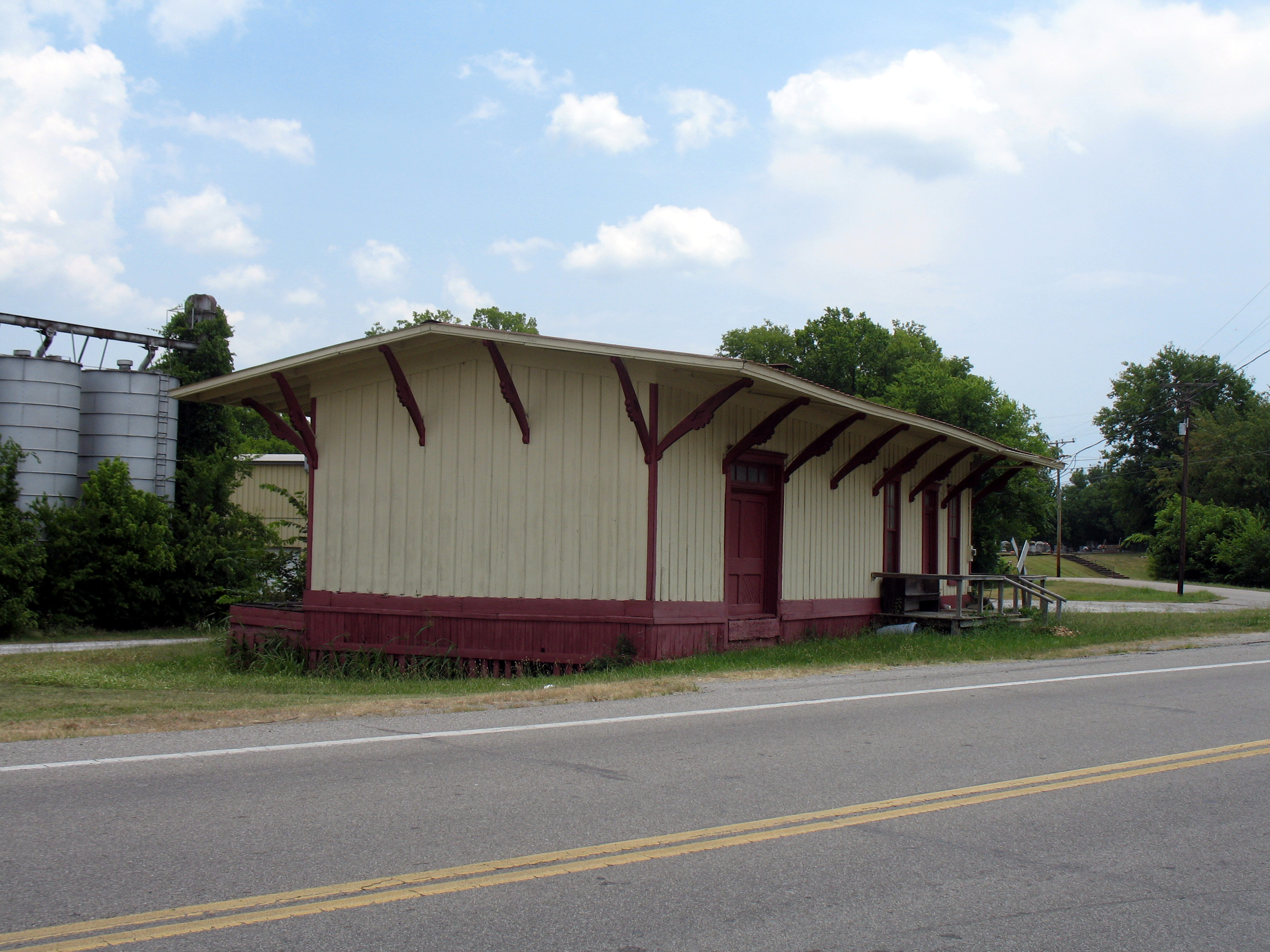
The depot in Belfast was added to the National List of Historic Places in 1984
