= Mount Baker Theatre =

Theater in Bellingham, Washington, United States

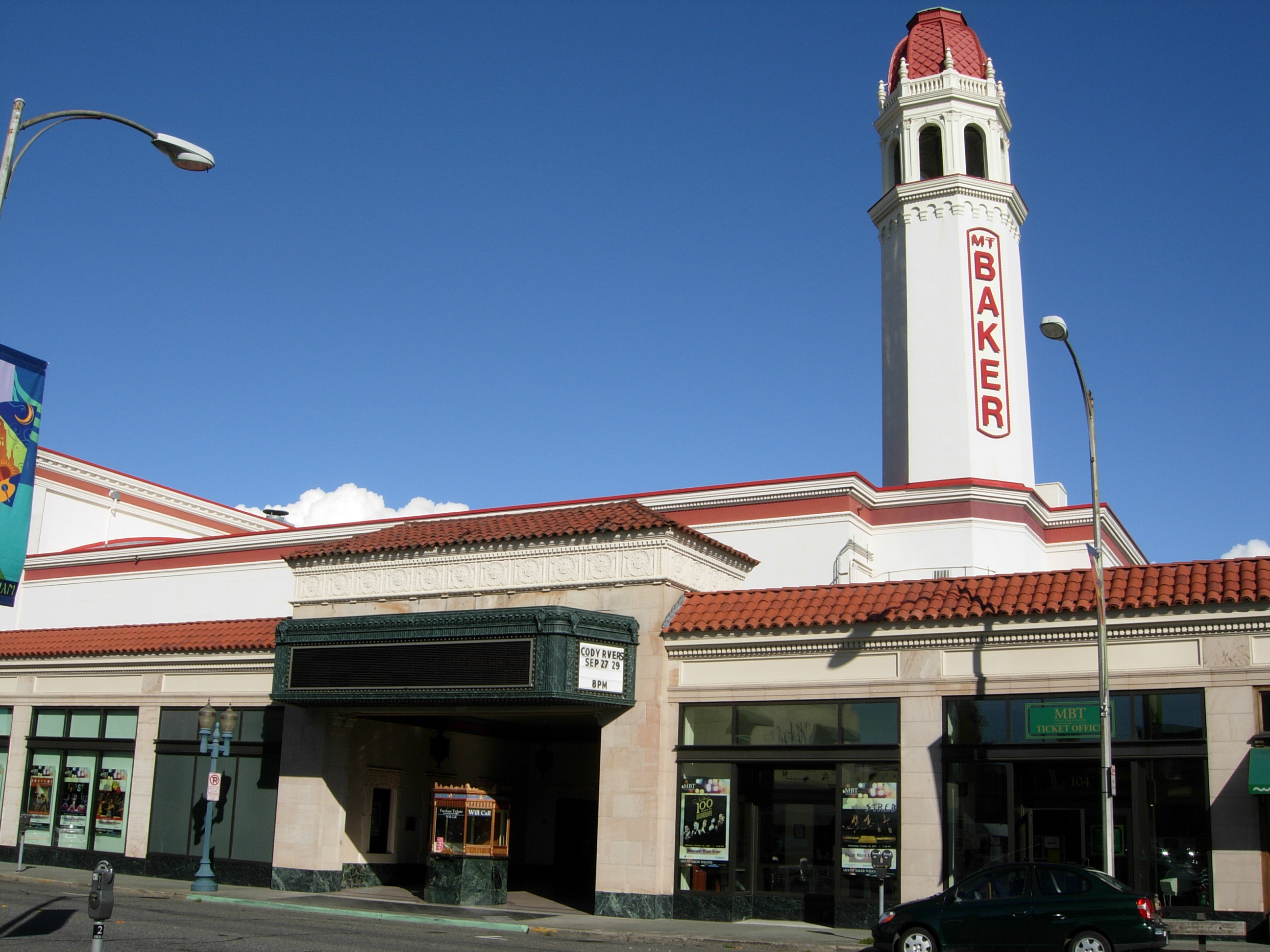
- Interactive map of Mount Baker Theatre
- Address: 104 North Commercial Street; Bellingham, Washington; 98225
- Owner: City of Bellingham
- Operator: Mount Baker Theatre
- Capacity: Main Theatre: 1,517; Walton Theatre: 200

Construction
- Opened: April 29, 1927; 99 years ago
- Years active: 1927–present

Website
- www.mountbakertheatre.com
- Mount Baker Theatre
- U.S. National Register of Historic Places
- Coordinates: 48°45′8″N 122°28′36″W
- Architect: Robert Reamer
- Architectural style: Moorish–Spanish
- NRHP reference No.: 78002786
- Added to NRHP: December 14, 1978

The Mount Baker Theatre (officially abbreviated MBT) is a 1,517-seat performing arts venue and national historic landmark in Bellingham, Washington, United States. The theater hosts professional productions and concerts as well as community performances from the north of Puget Sound. The theater's main stage is the largest theatrical venue in Washington north of Seattle's Paramount and 5th Avenue.

Popular legend holds that the building is haunted by a ghost named Judy. The facility is owned by the city of Bellingham and managed by the nonprofit Mount Baker Theatre organization.

== Facility ==
The Mount Baker Theatre occupies half a city block. It has three distinct facilities for concerts, live theater, films, receptions, and other events. All public facilities, except the balcony, are fully ADA accessible. Some non-public facilities, such as backstage and storage spaces, may not be accessible.

=== Main Stage ===
The main theatre contains large stage facing floor and balcony seating. Using the main floor and balcony, seating capacity is 1,517 people. An orchestra pit sits five feet below the stage and can hold 25 musicians. The theatre has a professional lighting and sound system, a large movie screen and projection room, and a historic pipe organ.

=== Encore Room ===
The Encore Room is a 1,200 square feet (111 m^{2}) reception hall or meeting space in the southern portion of the theater. It can accommodate 120 people in standard seating and 60-80 seated at tables. A kitchen is adjacent to the room. The Encore Room is primarily used for serving Concessions during Main Stage performances.

=== Walton Theatre ===
The Walton Theatre is named in honor of Harold and Irene Walton. It is a smaller performance space west of the main theater. There are attached restrooms and a kitchen.

== Events ==
The Mount Baker Theatre has hosted a variety of events over the years, including live theater, concerts, movies, arts festivals, and comedy shows.

Some notable events include a free show put on by Leo the Lion of MGM Studios on August 27, 1930.

== Architecture ==
The Mount Baker Theatre was designed by architect Robert Reamer (who also designed Seattle's 5th Avenue Theatre) in a Moorish–Spanish style.

The original light that topped the theater's spire was a search light taken from the decommissioned USS Oregon (BB-3), a battleship that served in the Spanish-American War. The light was made by the General Electric Company. It was purchased at auction in Bremerton while the USS Oregon was docked there in 1926. While hoisting the light into place during the construction of the theater, the boom used to lift it broke due to the weight of the light. The light crashed into the supportive framing below but was undamaged. When installed, the searchlight had a range of about 16 miles when lit. On a clear night, the light could be seen as far as Burlington and Blaine.

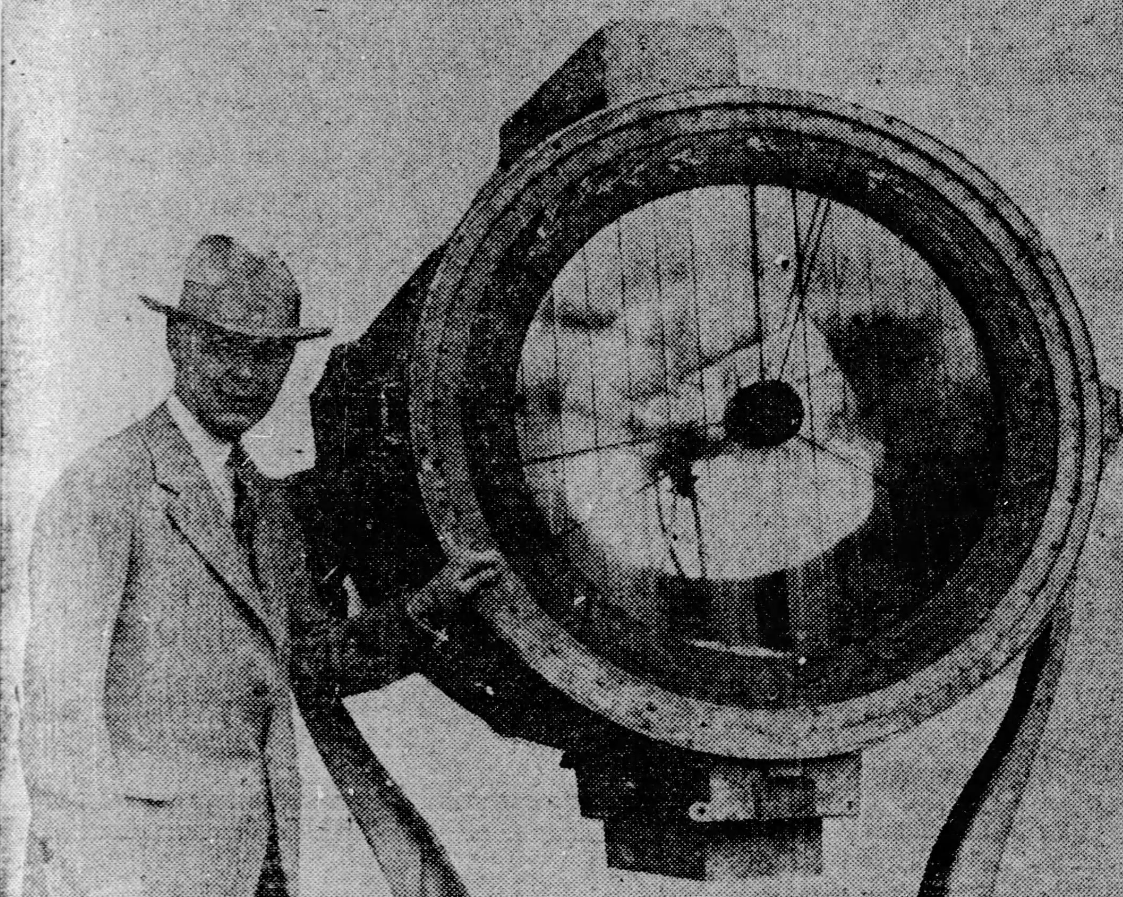
Photo of searchlight from USS Oregon, 1927

== History ==
The Mount Baker Theater was built to provide entertainment and a community space for the fast-growing city of Bellingham. It was designed by architect Robert Reamer.

Geographically, the theater is located in the arts/historic district of downtown. Bellingham's Carnegie library was located just south of the theater. The Bellingham Tower stands tall directly to the theater's west. The tower was built as a luxurious hotel; it is an office building with a café at street level. At 15 stories, it is the tallest building in Bellingham and Whatcom County. The original City Hall, built in 1891, stands two blocks west of the theater and is home to the Whatcom Museum. The Bellingham Bank Building, Federal Building, and Crown Plaza are within a few blocks to the southeast.

Construction on the theater began in the fall of 1926, with the original opening date set for March 1, 1927. The cost to build the theater was estimated to be $300,000, which is about $5.6 million in modern day. The theater was built for Pacific Northwest Theaters Inc. At the time of construction, Pacific Northwest Theaters ran 36 movie palaces, including the recently opened 5th Avenue Theater in Seattle and the Broadway Theater in Portland, Oregon.

A Style 215 Wurlitzer brand theatre organ was installed in April 1927, which was considered top of the line at the time. The total cost of the organ was $20,000, which is about $370,000 in modern day. The original electric signage was installed on the front of the theater on April 25, 1927.

The theater officially opened on Friday, April 29, 1927, to much fanfare across the community. Decorations were placed on streets surrounding the theater. A live band played outside the theater from 7 p.m. to 10 p.m. The first movie to be screened at the theater was Slide Kelly Slide, a sports comedy film directed by Edward Sedgwick. The movie screened for 4 days after opening.

Upon opening, the theater manager was George Douglas. Doris Winters was named head usher on opening. She had previously worked as head usher at the United Artists Theater in Seattle. The ushers on opening were female, and the uniform consisted of a satin white dress with red trim that was designed by Catherine Grofton. Douglas and Winters hired exclusively brunette ushers, as they believed brunettes would fit the theater's Spanish architecture.

On November 8, 1931, during a showing of the film Get-Rich-Quick Wallingford, theater manager Art Hile and cashier Olive Keener were robbed at gunpoint. Hile and Keener were taking the money from that evening's show to the from the box office to the administration office when they were held up by two armed men brandishing a .45 automatic and a .38 revolver. Hile claimed that both assailants seemed like they were on drugs during the robbery. The pair robbed the theater of $800, which is about $17,000 in modern day. It was one of the largest robberies to happen in Bellingham at the time.

In October 2025, a windstorm knocked the letters "B" and "A" off the theater's spire. The letters were replaced in February 2026.

== Managers ==
- George S. Douglas (1927-1929)
- Art Hile (1929-1934)
- Jack Rosenberg (1934-1935)
- Bob Monaghan (1935-1950s)
- LeRoy S. Kastner (1951-1974, 1977-1984)

== Ghosts ==

For decades, theatre staff have reported unusual phenomena, which has led to an urban legend of the theatre being haunted. Reports of the theatre being haunted date back to at least the 1970s. Allegedly, the theatre is haunted by a ghost named Judy, whose house was either burned down before the theater was built, or torn down to build the theater. Historical records show that two residential structures and a church were demolished to build the theater. Another version of Judy's background is that she was the daughter of one of the construction workers building the theater and was killed in an accident. Judy is said to haunt a corridor leading from the balcony to the mezzanine. She is said to be fond of male workers, often calling their names and touching them.

Other lesser known entities include the ghost of a feral cat in the basement and a man in a pin-striped suit named Geoffry. The theater is also supposedly haunted by Michael Chervenock, who was a theater worker during the late 1970s and died in 1992.

In August 2010, paranormal investigators, affiliated with the Syfy Channel's show Ghost Hunters, and psychics spent a night in the theater to find evidence of paranormal activity.
