= 1411 Fourth Avenue Building =

Building in Seattle, Washington, U.S.

- U.S. National Register of Historic Places
- Seattle Landmark
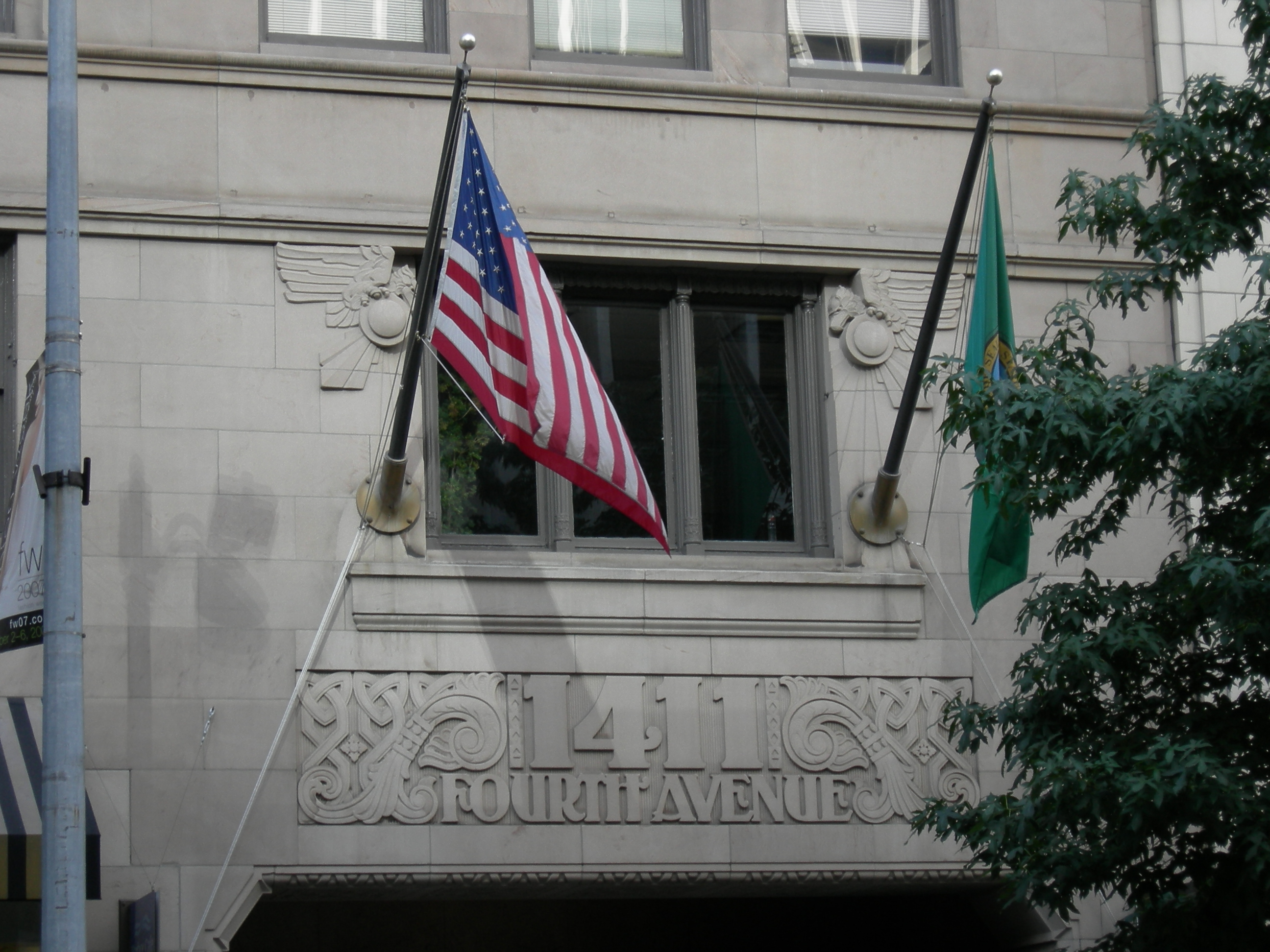
- The 1411 Fourth Avenue Building

- Location within Downtown Seattle Location within Washington (state)
- Location: Seattle, Washington
- Coordinates: 47°36′33.84″N 122°20′10.25″W
- Built: 1928
- Architect: Robert C. Reamer
- Architectural style: Art Deco
- NRHP reference No.: 91000633

Significant dates
- Added to NRHP: 1991
- Designated SEATL: October 16, 1989

The 1411 Fourth Avenue Building is a historic building in Seattle, Washington, that was listed on the National Register of Historic Places on May 28, 1991 (ID #91000633). The 15-story plus basement Art Deco structure is located at the Northwest corner of Fourth Avenue and Union Street. The main entrance is located at 1411 Fourth Avenue.

The building was built in 1928 for the Stimson Realty Company under the direction of the Metropolitan Building Company for $1.1 million by Teufel & Carlson, contractors. Robert C. Reamer was the architect. The building was fully constructed within seven months in 1928, setting a record for a building of its size.

From 1997 to 2012 the ground floor housed Tully's Coffee flagship store on the corner of Fourth Avenue and Union Street. The store was among those closed following Tully's bankruptcy protection filing.

In 2016, it was sold to the Onni Group for $29.6 million.

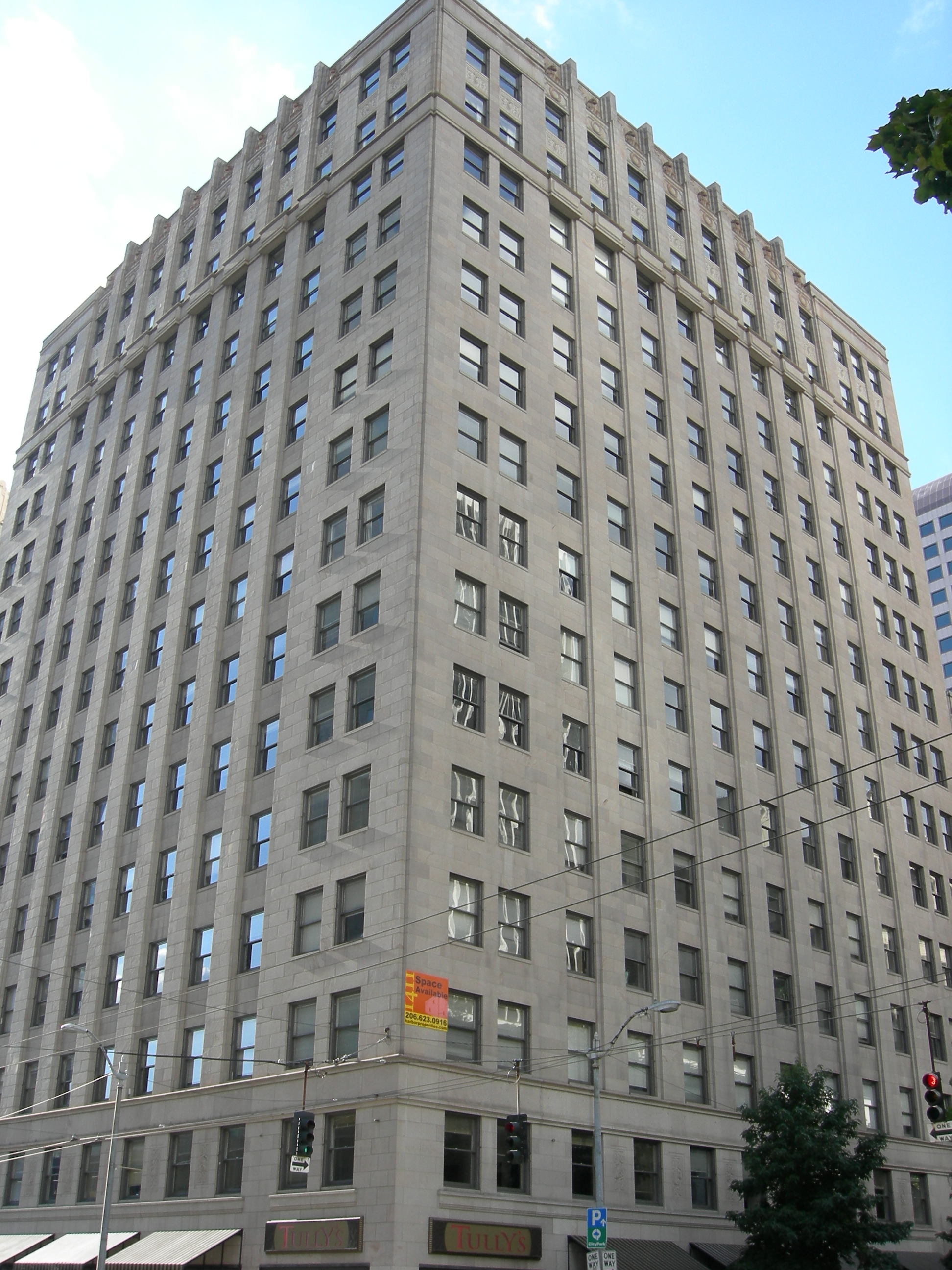
Exterior

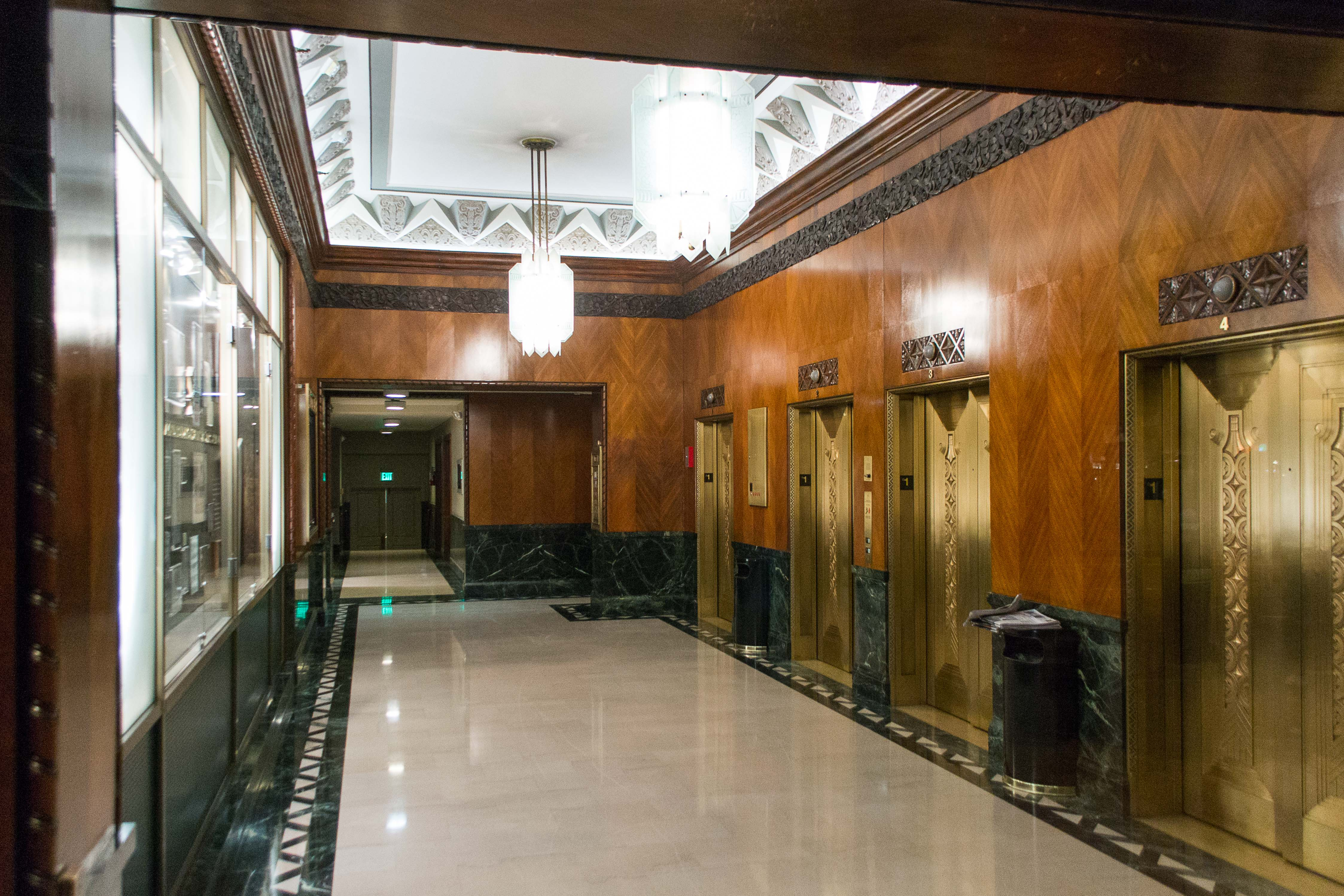
Elevator lobby
