= Robert Reamer =

American architect

Robert C. Reamer
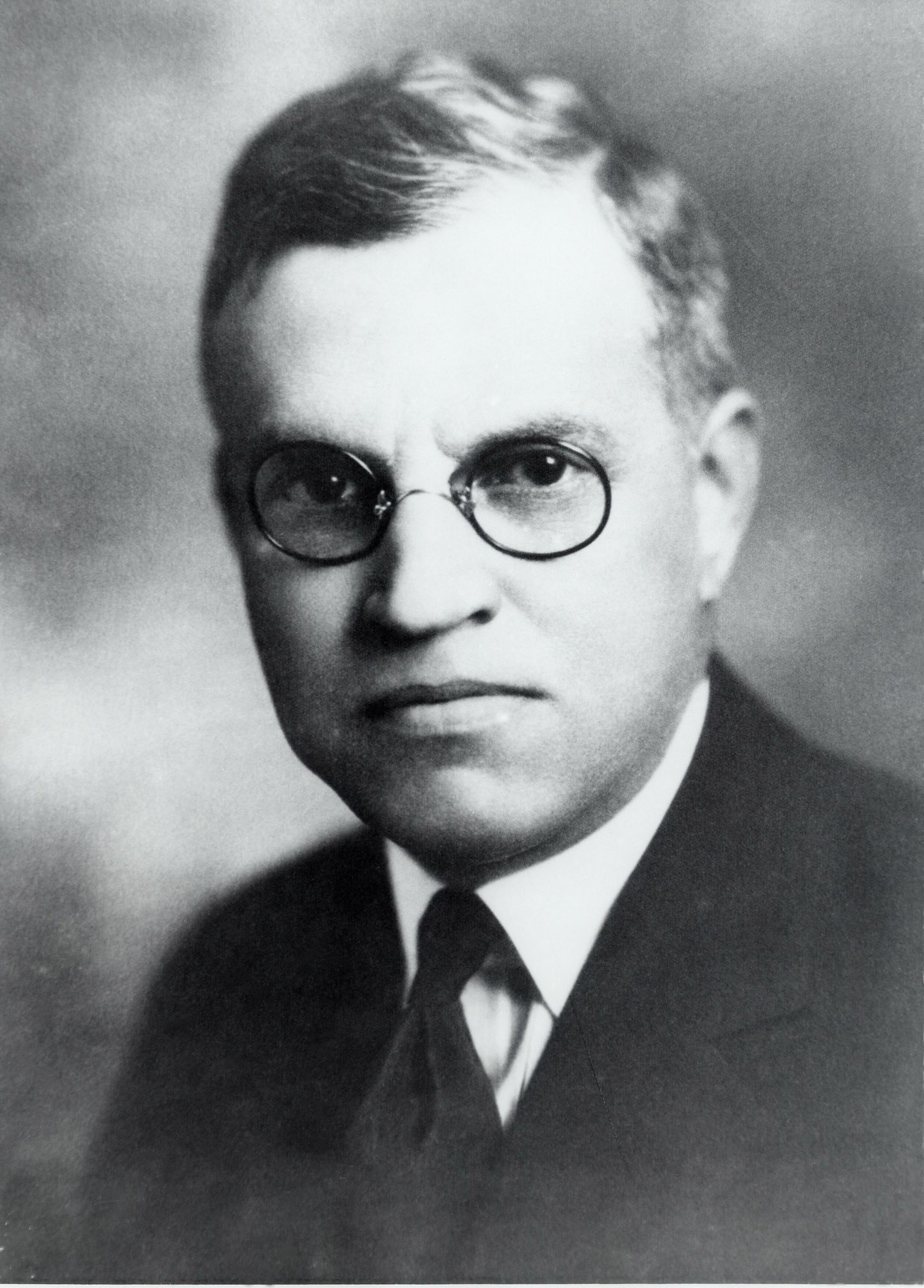
- Robert Chambers Reamer
- Occupation: Architect
- Buildings: Old Faithful Inn
- Projects: Yellowstone National Park hotels

Robert Chambers Reamer (1873–1938) was an American architect, most noted for the Old Faithful Inn in Yellowstone National Park. A number of his works are listed on the National Register of Historic Places for their architecture.

Reamer was born in and spent his early life in Oberlin, Ohio. He left home at the age of thirteen and went to work in an architect's office in Detroit as a draftsman.

By the age of twenty-one, Reamer had moved to San Diego and had opened the architectural office of Zimmer & Reamer in partnership with Samuel B. Zimmer. The firm produced a wide variety of projects, but the only surviving example of Zimmer & Reamer's work is the George H. Hill Block in the Gaslamp District. The partnership dissolved in 1898, but Reamer continued to work on his own, including work at the Hotel del Coronado. During this period he became acquainted with the president of the Yellowstone Park Company, Harry W. Child.

== Yellowstone Park Company and the Northern Pacific Railroad ==
The Old Faithful Inn was commissioned in 1902 by Child, and funded with loans from the Northern Pacific Railway, using laborers who were experienced railroad trestle builders. Child introduced Reamer to Charles Sanger Mellen, president of the Northern Pacific.

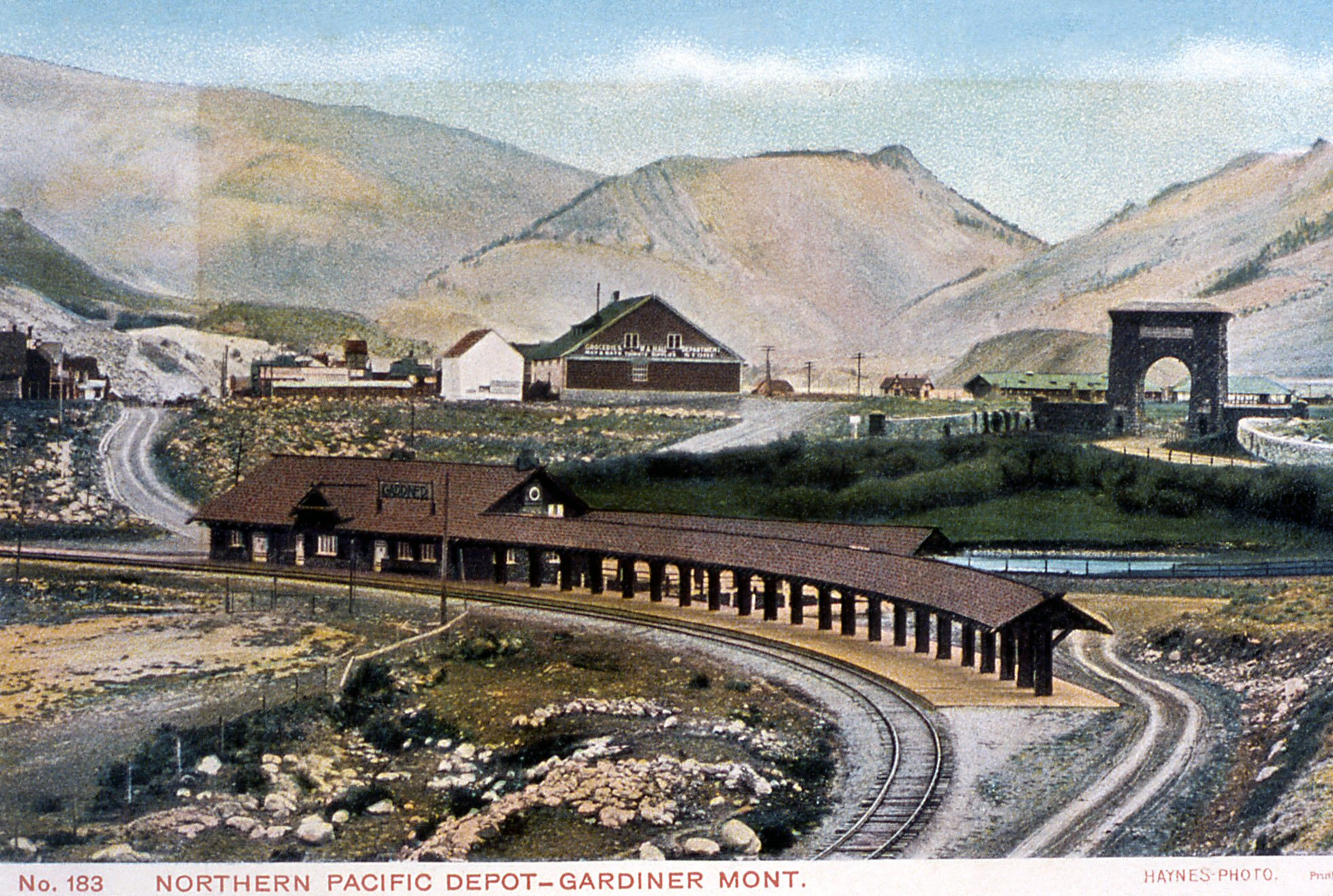
Northern Pacific Railway Terminal Postcard, F. Jay Haynes

While he was carrying out design work on the Old Faithful Inn for Child, Reamer was also designing the Gardiner, Montana depot for the Northern Pacific, at the northern entrance to Yellowstone National Park. The depot and the Inn were complementary projects, and similar in style. The depot opened first, in 1903, and embodied many design features that Reamer explored on a grander scale at the Old Faithful Inn.

=== Old Faithful Inn ===
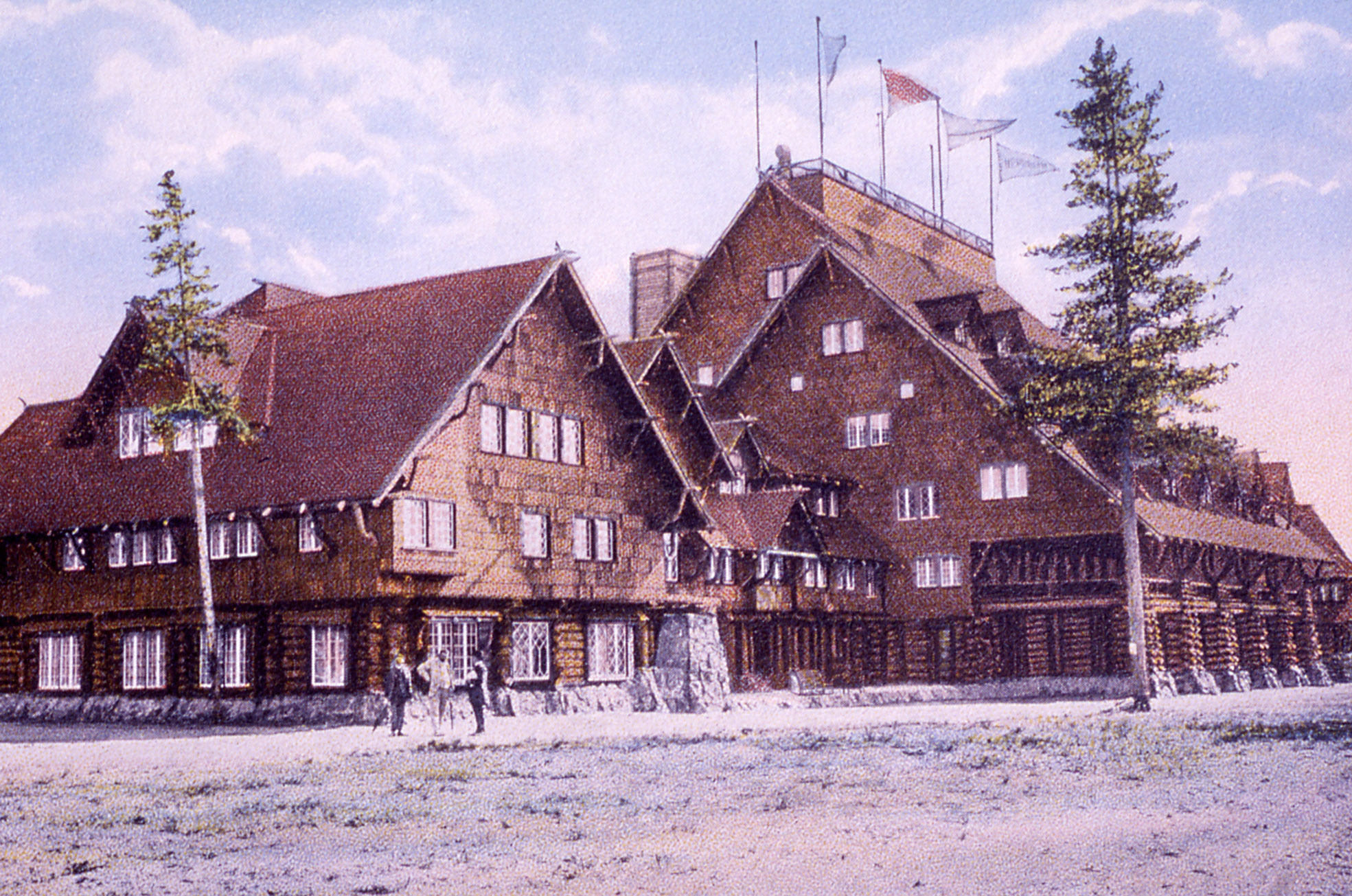
Postcard of Old Faithful Inn by F. Jay Haynes

The Old Faithful Inn is a National Historic Landmark, honored as the inspiration for a rustic style of architecture popular throughout the western United States. The rustic style is sometimes considered a branch of the Arts and Crafts movement, which emphasized fine, hand-hewn details and harmony with the surrounding environment. It became so popular at western National Parks that it is sometimes referred to "parkitecture".

At the Old Faithful Inn, the pitched roof is covered in yard-long redwood shingles; the roof shape echoes the shape of surrounding mountains. Inside, a spectacular, six-story lobby features native lodgepole pine balconies, and it is anchored by a 500-ton rhyolite chimney and fireplace. Reamer carefully placed windows to mimic light filtering through a canopy of pine trees. Furniture was provided by the Old Hickory Furniture Company of Indiana, whose 100-year-old dining room chairs are still in use today.

=== Lake Yellowstone Hotel ===
At the same time that Reamer was building the Old Faithful Inn from the ground up, he was also overseeing the expansion of the Lake Yellowstone Hotel. In complete contrast to the Old Faithful Inn, the Lake Yellowstone Hotel was originally an austere clapboarded barn-like structure. Reamer added Greek Revival porticoes and sparely detailed trim.

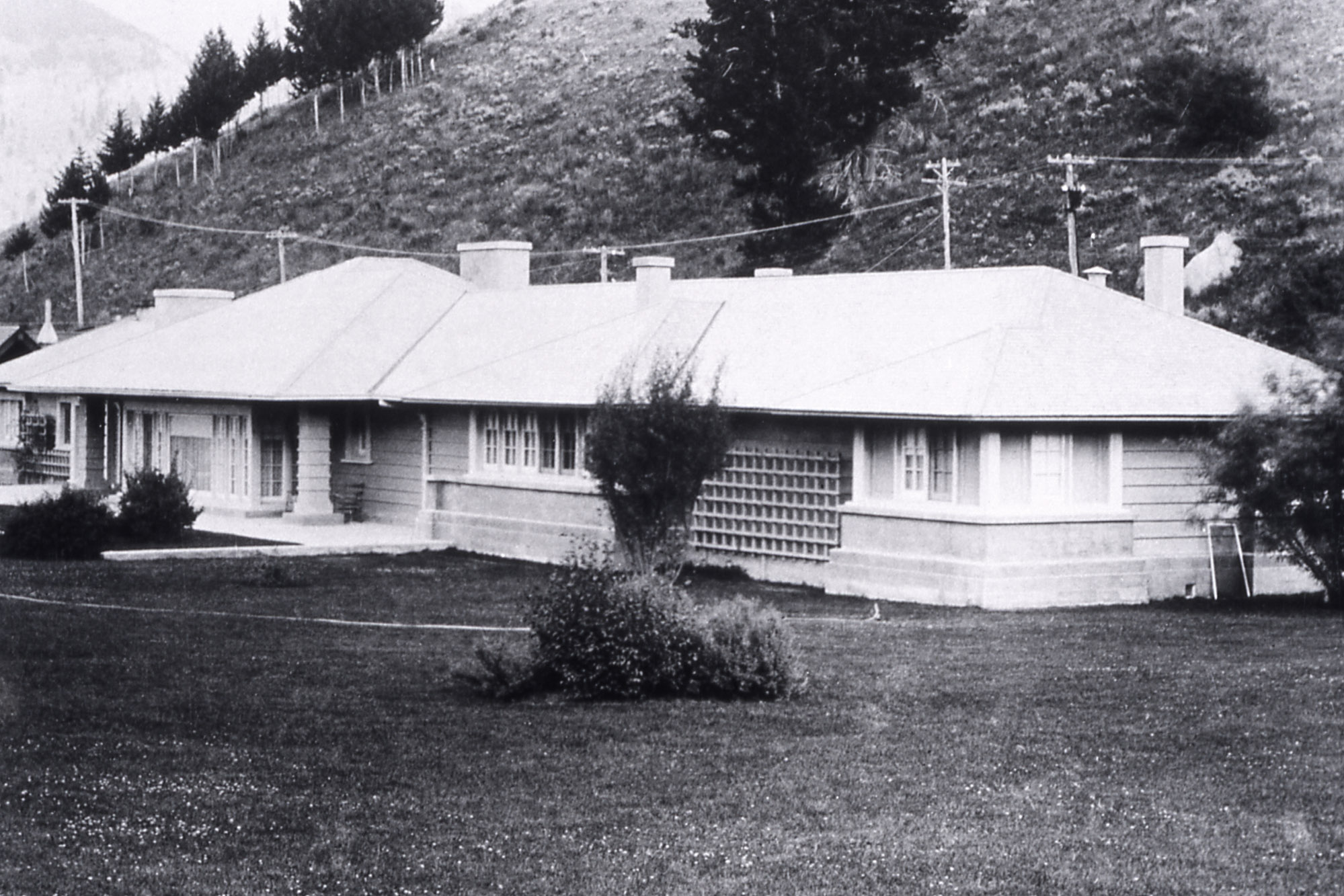
H.W. Child Residence, Mammoth Hot Springs in 1917

=== Personal tragedy ===
After the major work of 1903, Reamer spent ensuing years designing and supervising a variety of supporting buildings and residences around Yellowstone, particularly in Mammoth Hot Springs and Gardiner. In 1906, he developed a proposal for Child for a huge hotel for Mammoth that was to foreshadow the Canyon Hotel. However, in 1906 Reamer's wife Mabel died at age 30, of Bright's disease. Reamer's alcoholism, which had previously been noted, became acute, and he apparently returned to live with his family for the next two years.

Reamer returned to Child and Yellowstone in 1908 and prepared yet another proposal for a grand hotel at Mammoth as well as a variety of lesser buildings for the Yellowstone Park Association. In 1909, Reamer accompanied the Childs on a tour of European hotels, apparently in preparation for future work.

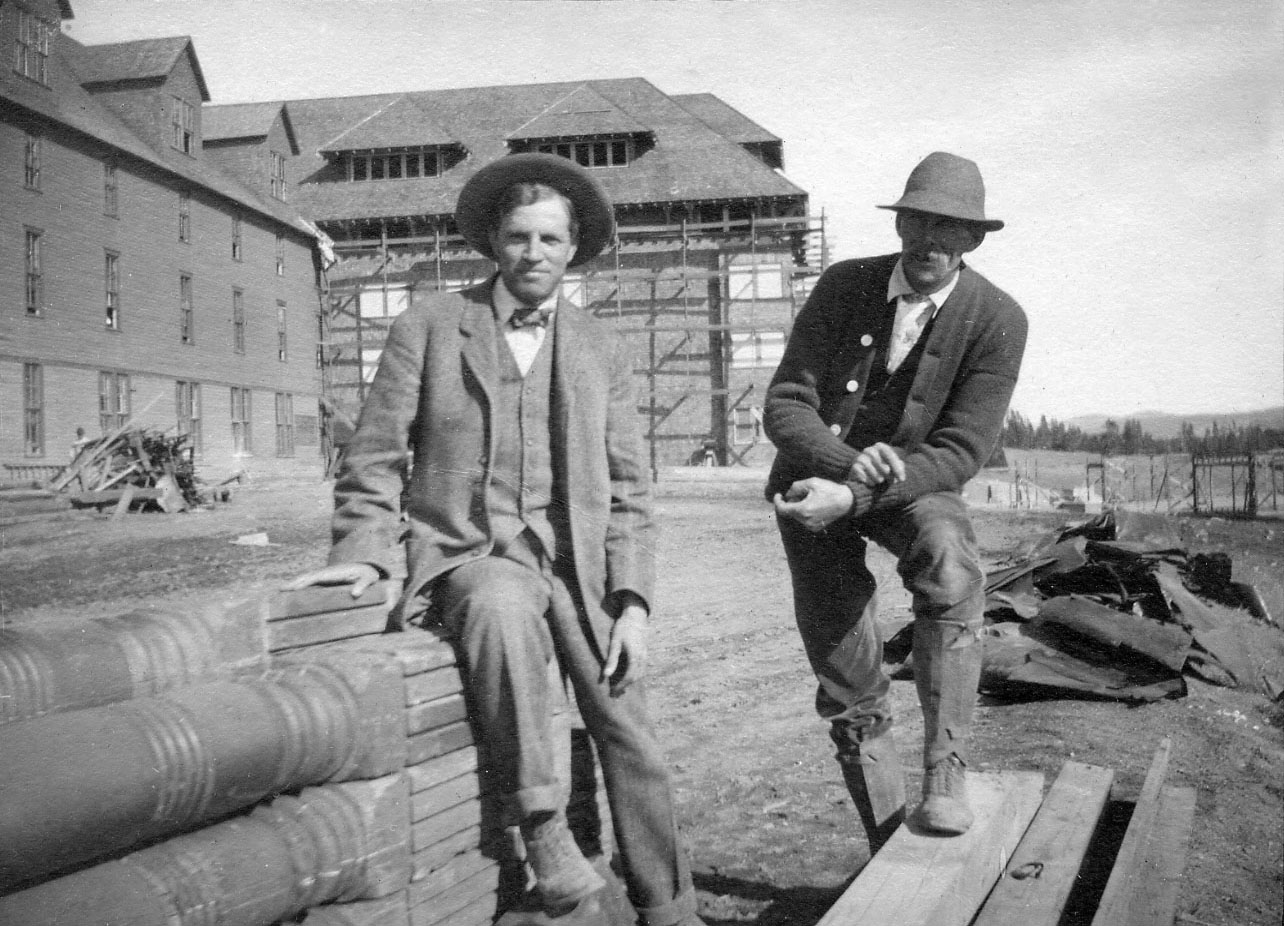
Reamer (left) and foreman at the Canyon Hotel construction site

=== Canyon Hotel ===
In 1910, Reamer presented designs for a new hotel to be located at Canyon Village, adjacent to the Yellowstone Falls and the Grand Canyon of the Yellowstone, to be known as the Canyon Hotel. This hotel incorporated portions of a previous hotel, built in 1891, and was 750 feet long with 400 rooms and 100 baths. Occupying a prominent site on a hillside, it was built in the winter of 1910–1911. The design bore a close resemblance to Frank Lloyd Wright's Prairie style work, with a strong horizontal emphasis and a commanding roofline.

== Expanding practice ==
Reamer relocated to Cleveland in 1912 and began a series of commissions with railroads, building on his experience with the Northern Pacific. A proposed summit hotel on Mount Washington for the New York, New Haven and Hartford Railroad in 1912 never came to pass, but work for the Maine Central Railroad at Augusta, Maine and the Union Station in Clinton, Massachusetts did proceed. At the same time, Reamer designed additions to the Mammoth Hotel and the Old Faithful Inn.

== Seattle ==
By 1918, Reamer had remarried and relocated to Seattle. Over the next few years, Reamer established a new practice, beginning as a staff architect with the Metropolitan Building Company. With the company, he designed several buildings, including the Seattle Times Building in 1930. Once out on his own, he continued his hotel work with a series of eight hotels in Washington. The most notable of these was the Lake Quinault Lodge, constructed in 1926 on the Olympic Peninsula. Later, Reamer began to specialize in movie theaters, working in the elaborate thematic styles popular at the time. The 1926 5th Avenue Theatre was part of the MBC's Skinner Building project in Seattle, with a Chinese-inspired interior. The Moorish-inspired Mount Baker Theatre opened in Bellingham, Washington in 1927. An Art Deco Fox theater in Spokane followed in 1931, with another Fox in Billings, Montana the same year. During the same period, Reamer designed the 15-story 1411 Fourth Avenue building in Seattle, as part of a series of commercial buildings.

== Return to Yellowstone ==
Reamer expanded and altered his hotels at Yellowstone with a series of additions and alterations to the Old Faithful Inn, Canyon Hotel, Mammoth Hotel and the Lake Yellowstone Hotel from 1926 to 1936. Most notably, the Old Faithful Inn was expanded to include the present dining room and Bear Pit Lounge, and the Lake Yellowstone Hotel received a modest addition facing Yellowstone Lake that is known today as the Reamer Lounge. Reamer also added a dining room and lounge to the Mammoth Hotel. The Map Room Lounge includes seventeen-by-ten-foot map of the United States, made of inlaid wood by Reamer and his associate W. H. Fey.

== Legacy ==
Reamer's second wife, Louise Chase Reamer, niece of Yellowstone National Park Commissioner John W. Meldrum, died of ovarian cancer in 1933. In 1935, Reamer began to experience health problems that led to the amputation of a leg in 1937. He died in Seattle of a heart attack on 7 January 1938.

Reamer's work at the Old Faithful Inn came at a time when the National Park Service was developing the western national parks to handle an influx of tourism. As one of the first and most notable examples of the National Park Service Rustic style, the Old Faithful Inn influenced subsequent work at other parks throughout the American West.

Images of Robert C. Reamer's work
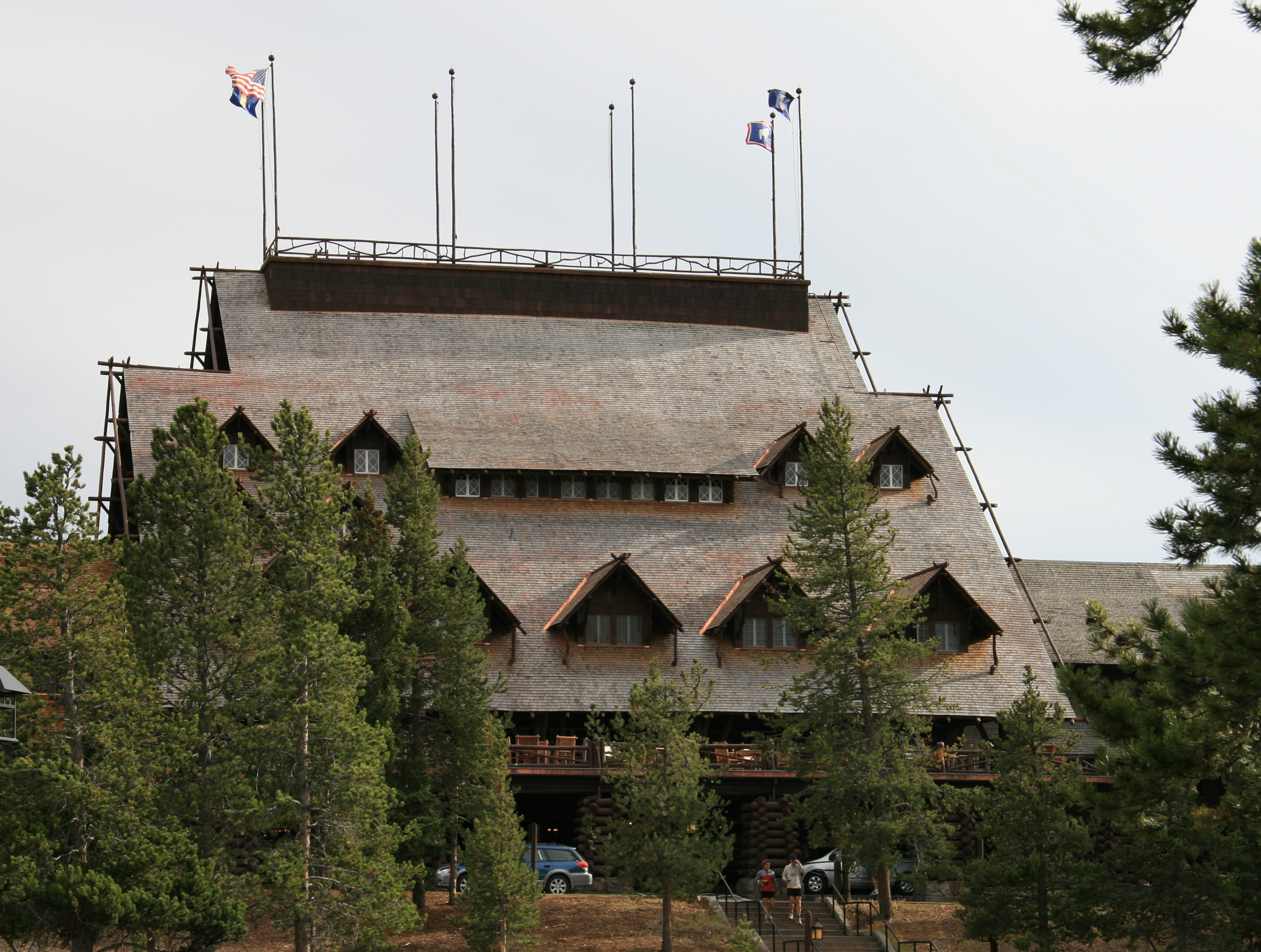
Old Faithful Inn

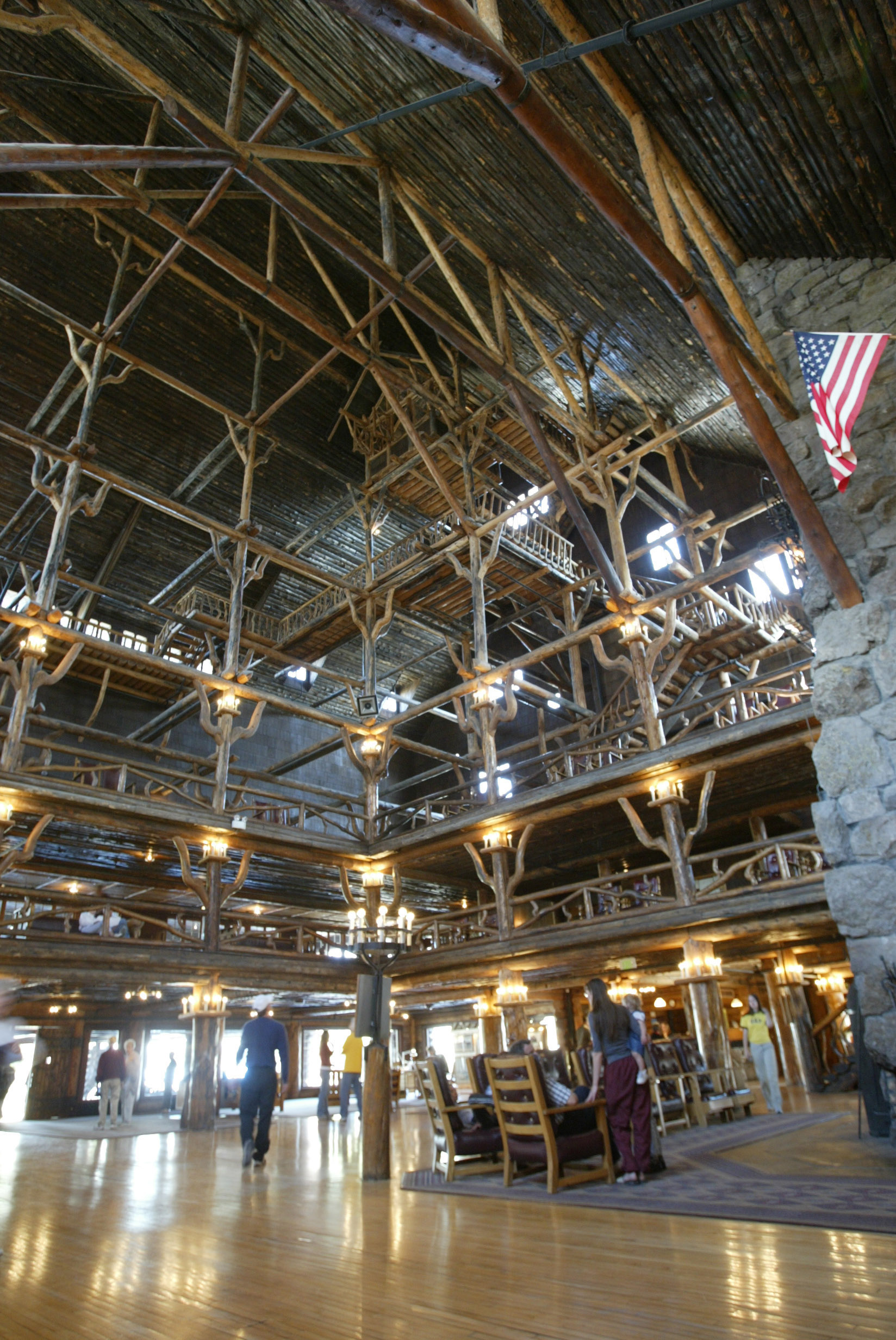
The interior of the Old Faithful Inn

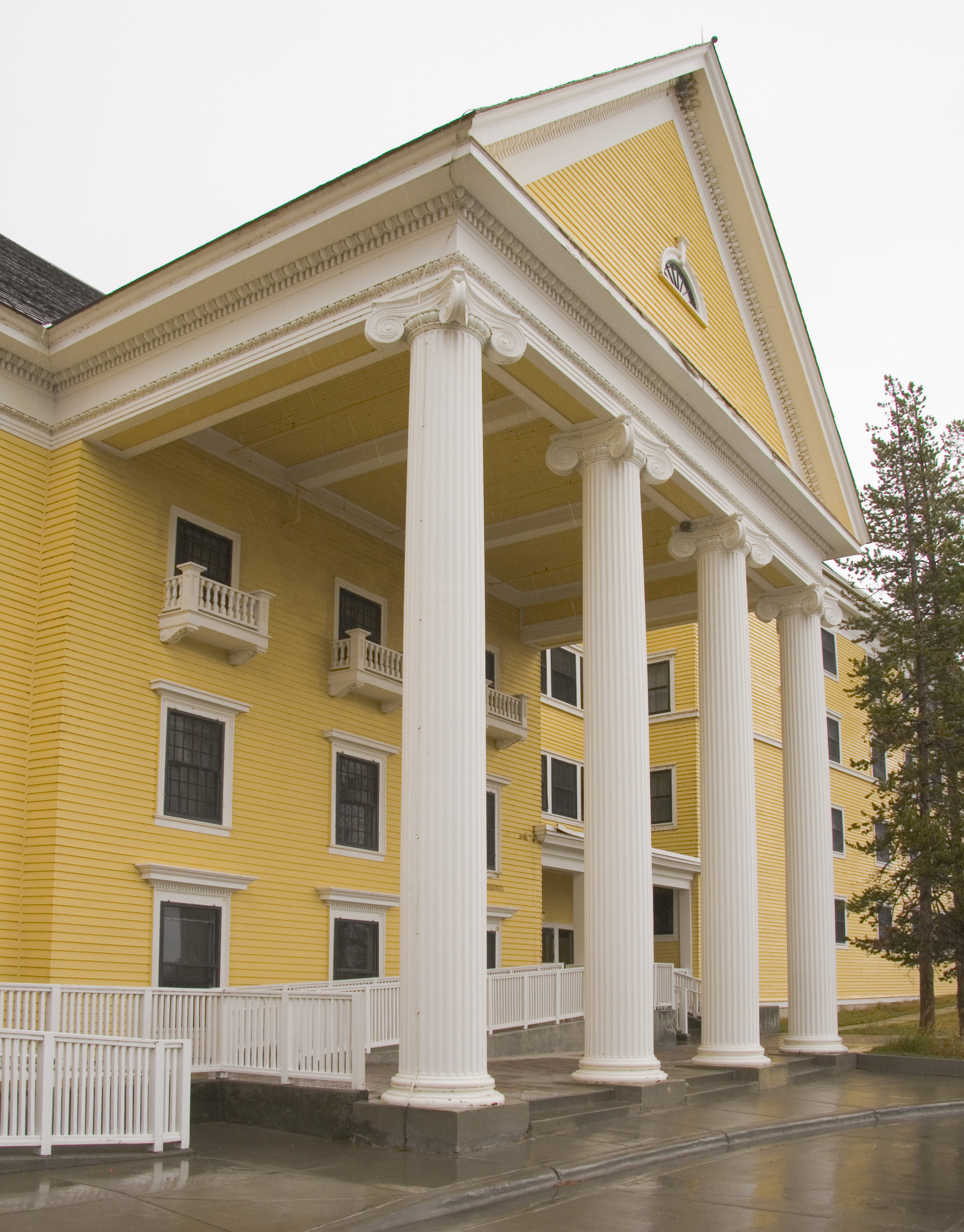
Lake Yellowstone Hotel portico

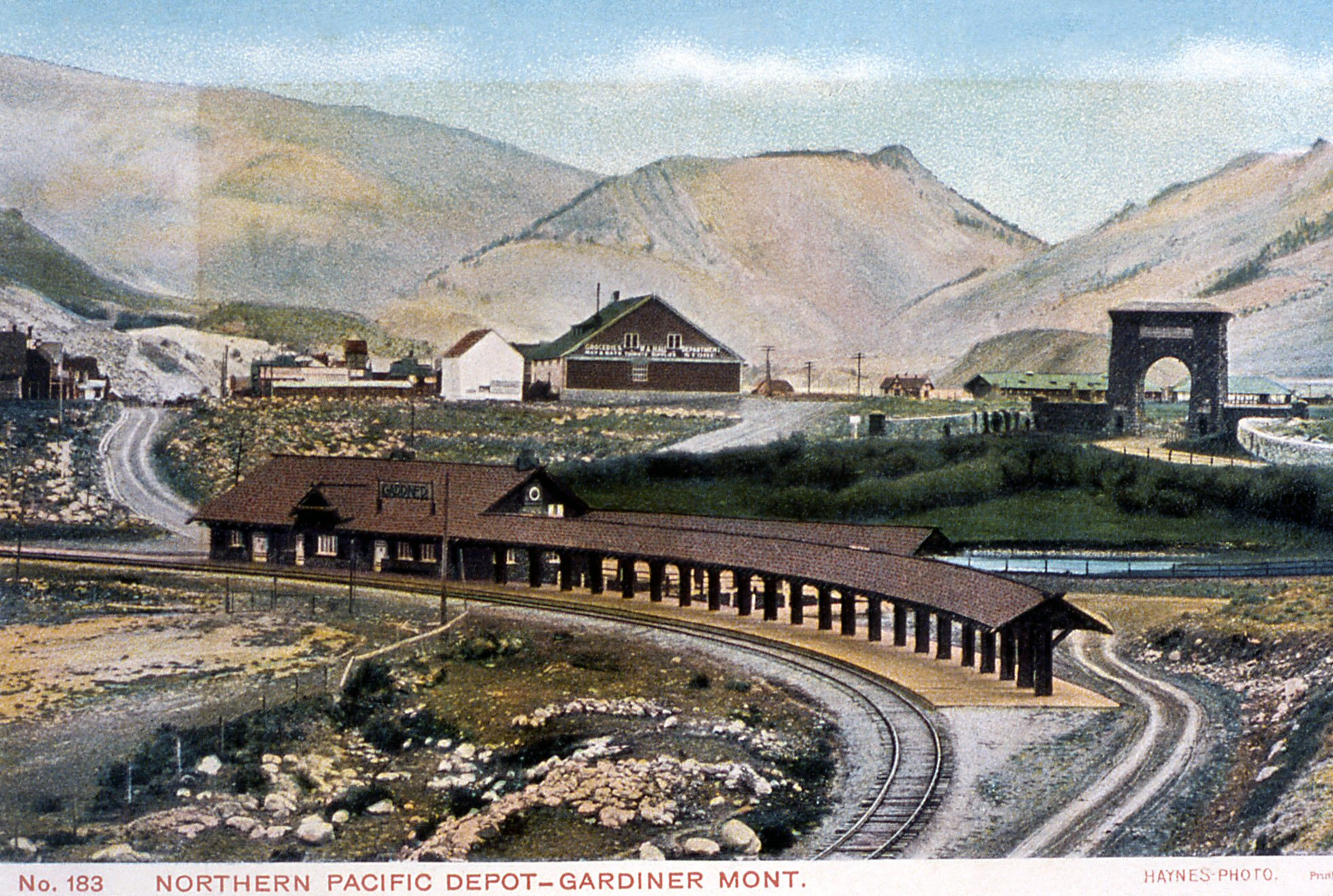
Gardiner station Gardiner, Montana, F. Jay Haynes postcard

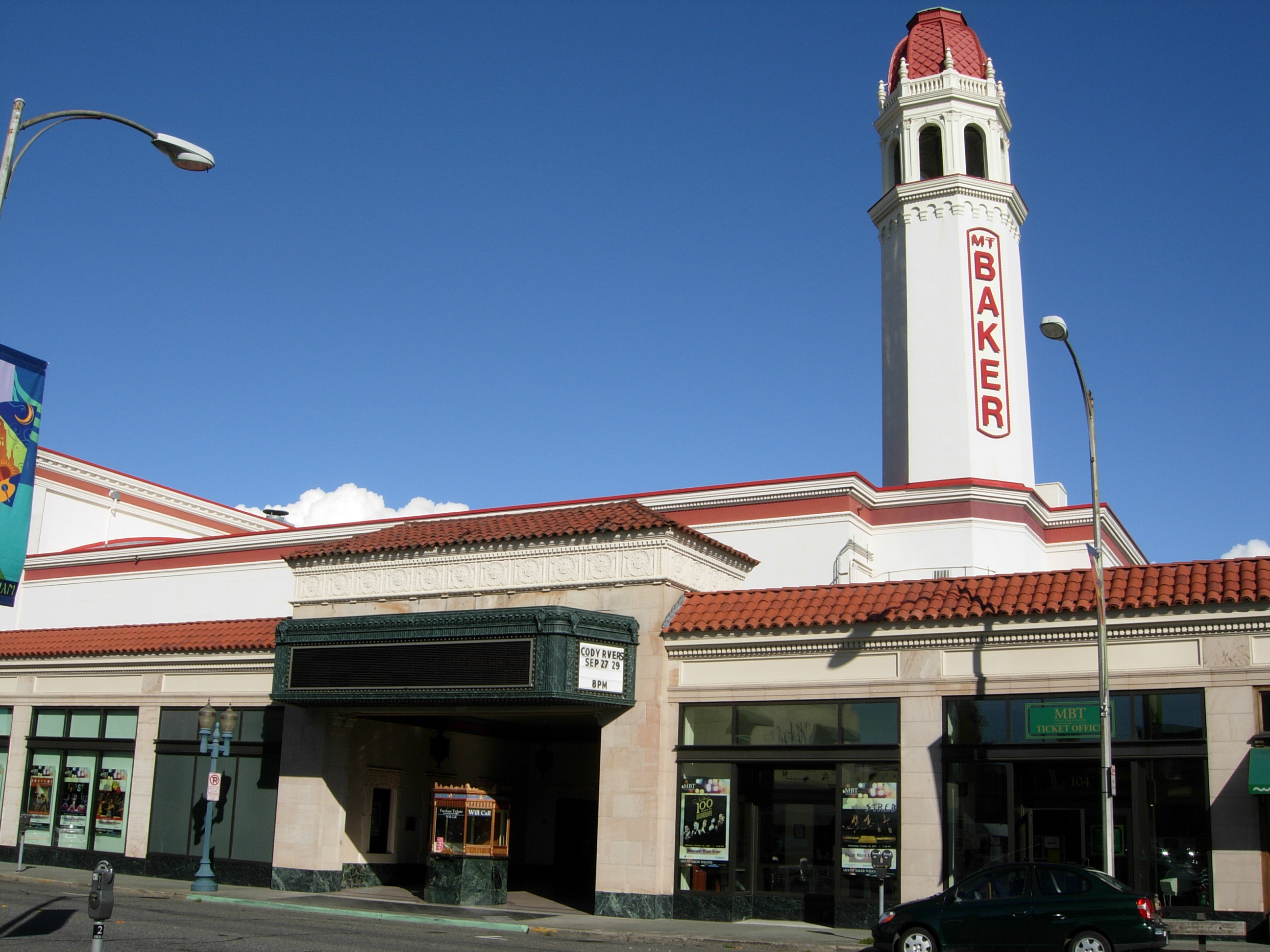
Mount Baker Theater, 2007

== Extant work ==
- Hall's Mercantile (1903), in Gardiner, Montana, now the headquarters of the Yellowstone Association
- Old Faithful Inn (1904, additions 1913–1914), West Thumb, Wyoming, Yellowstone National Park, Wyoming, NRHP-listed
- Lake Hotel (expansion, 1904, additions 1923, 1928, 1936), also known as Lake Yellowstone Hotel, Yellowstone National Park, NRHP-listed and designated a National Historic Landmark in 2015
- Masonic Home (1906), Helena, Montana
- H.W. Child House (1908), (Executive House), Mammoth Hot Springs, Yellowstone National Park
- C.B. Power Bungalow (1911), 1.2 mi. N of I-15 and 1 mi. W of US 287, Wolf Creek, Montana, NRHP-listed
- Mammoth Hot Springs (1913 hotel addition), Yellowstone National Park
- Union Station (1914), Clinton, Massachusetts
- Lake Quinault Lodge (1926), South Shore Rd., Lake Quinault, Washington, NRHP-listed
- Edmond Meany Hotel (1931), Seattle, Washington
- Fifth Avenue Theater (1926), also known as Skinner Building, 1300-1334 5th Ave., Seattle, Washington, NRHP-listed
- Mount Baker Theatre (1927), 106 N. Commercial St., Bellingham, Washington, NRHP-listed
- 1411 Fourth Avenue Building (1928), Seattle, Washington, 1928, NRHP-listed
- Fox Theater (Spokane, Washington) (1931), 1005 W. Sprague Ave., Spokane, Washington, NRHP-listed
- Fox Theater (1931, later Alberta Bair Theater), Billings, Montana

== Demolished work ==
- Northern Pacific Railway Gardiner station, Gardiner, Montana, 1903, demolished 1954
- Transportation Building (1903, burned 1925), Mammoth Hot Springs, Yellowstone National Park
- Canyon Hotel (1910, addition 1930, demolished 1962), Yellowstone National Park
- Maine Central Railroad Depot (1913, demolished 1961), Augusta, Maine,
- Seattle Times building (1931, demolished 2017), Seattle, Washington

== Unbuilt designs ==
- Mount Washington Summit Hotel (designed 1912), Mount Washington, New Hampshire

== Works not yet classified extant, demolished or unbuilt ==
- Works in Fort Yellowstone, Mammoth Hot Springs, Wyoming; Norris, Wyoming; Gardiner, Montana, near Buffalo Lake, Idaho, Mammoth Hot Springs, Wyoming, NRHP-listed
- Other works in Old Faithful Historic District besides those listed as extant or demolished above, NRHP-listed

== Sources ==
- Barringer, Mark Daniel. Selling Yellowstone: Capitalism and the Construction of Nature, Lawrence, Kansas: University Press of Kansas, 2002. ISBN 0-7006-1167-3
- Quinn, Ruth. Weaver of Dreams: The Life and Architecture of Robert C. Reamer, Gardiner, Montana: Leslie & Ruth Quinn, 2004. ISBN 0-9760945-1-7
