= Union Station (Columbia, Tennessee) =

- U.S. National Register of Historic Places
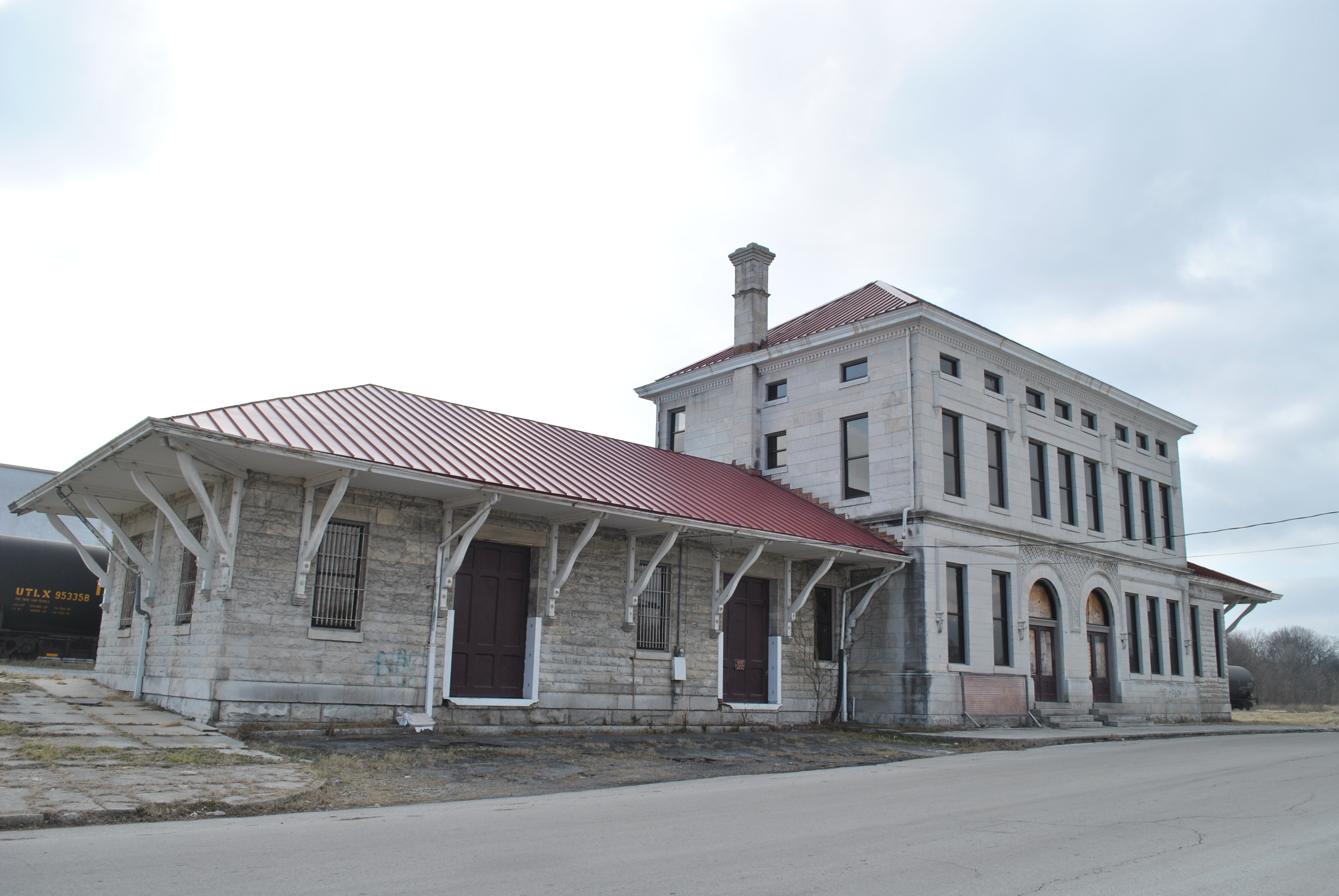

- Location within Tennessee Location within the United States
- Location: Depot Street Columbia, Tennessee
- Coordinates: 35°36′29″N 87°02′14″W
- Area: less than 1 acre (0.40 ha)
- Built: 1905
- Architectural style: Romanesque style
- NRHP reference No.: 86002908
- Added to NRHP: October 23, 1986

Union Station, also known as Columbia Railway Depot, is an historic train depot in the city of Columbia, Maury County, Tennessee. The depot was completed in 1905 by the Nashville, Chattanooga and St. Louis Railway (NC&StL) and the Louisville and Nashville Railroad (LN) as a union station. The building was placed on the National Register of Historic Places listings in Maury County, Tennessee on October 23, 1986.

== History ==
The Duck River Valley Narrow Gauge Railroad (NGRR) was chartered in 1870 and began construction in Columbia in 1874. By 1876, six miles were completed with the first 1.75 miles ran as a dual gauge on the then Nashville and Decatur (Louisville and Nashville) main line. By 1877 NGRR offered rail service from Columbia to Lewisburg (20 miles) and to Petersburg (34 miles) by 1879. The company ran into financial difficulties and in 1879 leased the tracks to NC&StL. The line was completed to Fayetteville (48 miles) on March 16, 1882, where there was a break-of-gauge. NC&StL purchased the line on March 21, 1888, converted the entire tracks to standard gauge by January 1, 1889, and the tracks were renamed the Columbia spur.

== Union Station ==
NC&StL and LN built Union Station in 1905, and the depot was shared with LN until 1945 when the Columbia to Lewisburg tracks were abandoned. The Lewisburg to Fayetteville section was abandoned in 1961. Union Station was listed on the Tennessee Preservation Trust, "Ten in Tennessee" list of endangered properties in 2009. The building was used for offices and apartments but became vacant in 1983. David and Debra Hill bought the property in foreclosure in 2012 with plans on restoration
