= Piața Unirii (disambiguation) =

Piața Unirii (English: Union Square) is a square in Bucharest, Romania

Piața Unirii may also refer to:

- Piața Unirii metro station
- Piața Unirii, Cluj-Napoca
- Piața Unirii, Iași
- Union Square, Timișoara
