= Union Station (Clinton, Massachusetts) =

Clinton
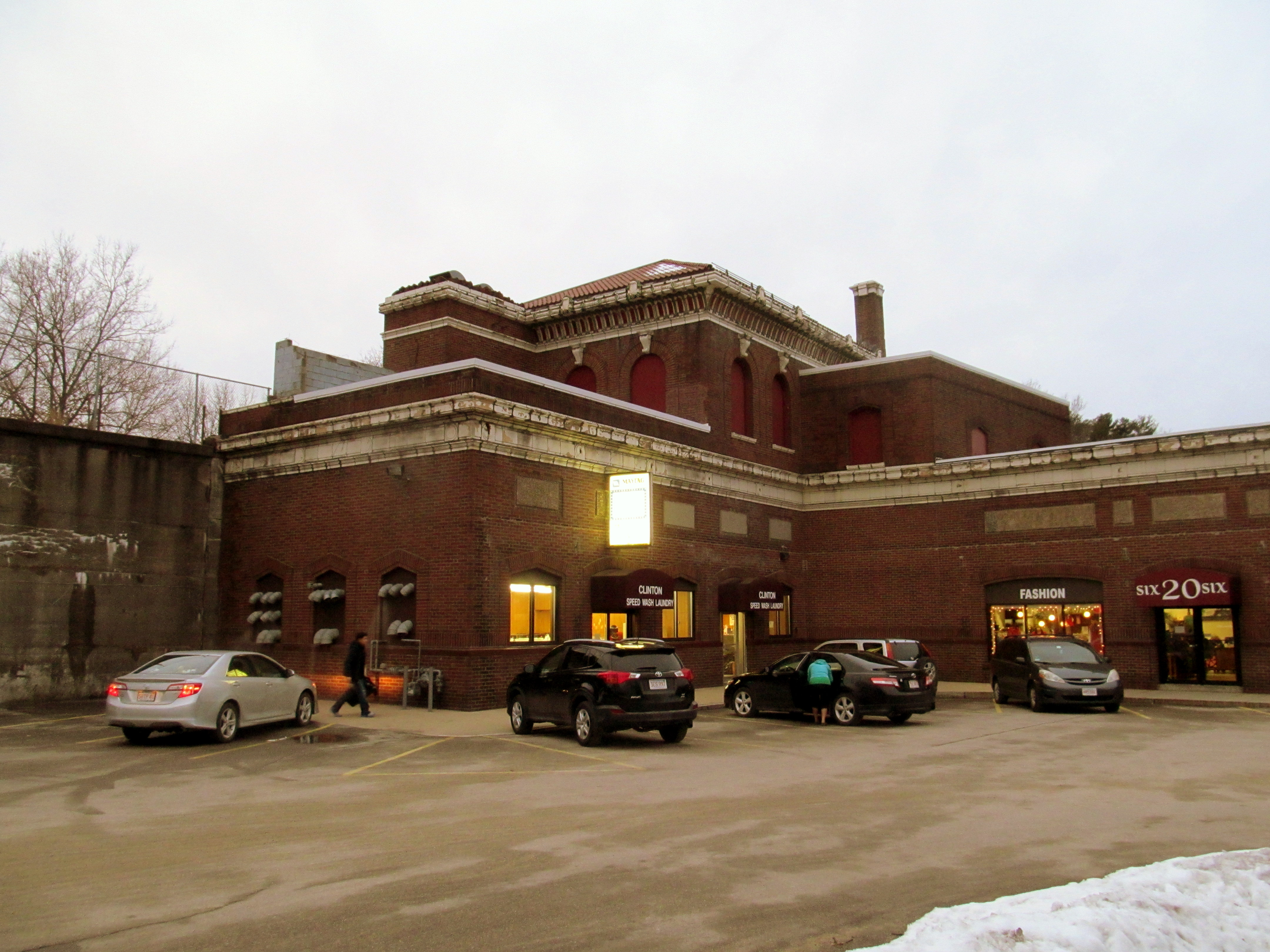
- The former station in 2016

Former services
Preceding station	Boston and Maine Railroad	Following station
Clinton Junction toward Worcester	Worcester – Nashua	Thayer toward Nashua
Clinton Junction toward Worcester	Worcester – Lowell	Thayer toward Lowell
Terminus	Central Mass Branch	West Berlin toward Boston
Preceding station	New York, New Haven and Hartford Railroad	Following station
Pratts Junction toward Fitchburg	Agricultural Branch	Bolton toward Framingham

Union Station is a former train station in Clinton, Massachusetts. It was designed by architect Robert Reamer, best known for the Old Faithful Inn and other projects in the Western United States. The station opened in 1914 and has two levels that served tracks going in perpendicular directions.
