= Union Square (Greensboro) =

Union Square at South Elm in Greensboro, North Carolina is a 7-acre project that includes Union Square Campus, a planned health care and nursing campus to be used by Cone Health and three colleges in the city: The University of North Carolina at Greensboro, North Carolina Agricultural and Technical State University, and Guilford Technical Community College. A 3-story building had its groundbreaking on April 7, 2015. The building opened on August 5, 2016.

== History ==
Elon University opened its law school in downtown Greensboro in 2006, and the school added more land for expansion in 2011. This led to the idea of a second downtown campus that would be shared by all the area colleges. Opportunity Greensboro included representatives from The University of North Carolina at Greensboro, North Carolina Agricultural and Technical State University, Bennett College, Greensboro College, Guilford College, Guilford Technical Community College, and the Elon law school. The organization studied a similar concept in Spokane, Washington.

In August 2013, Opportunity Greensboro, part of Action Greensboro, was considering four locations for a "Downtown University Campus" to be used by the five four-year colleges and universities plus Elon and GTCC. One site was on West Market Street and included part of Greensboro College; one was a county-owned site south of NewBridge Bank Park, and one was on East Lee Street in what was called the South Elm Redevelopment Project. A fourth location was known to Opportunity Greensboro co-chairman Ed Kitchen, but he declined to give details.

On November 19, 2013, Opportunity Greensboro announced a site. The 2.1 acres southeast of the intersection of Elm and Lee Streets would have enough room for a 105,000-square-foot building and parking for health care programs, plus room to expand the campus to include other programs. The campus was expected to lead to other development in the area, and 6 acres of land were available next to the site. Bob Chapman of South Elm Development Group said estimated total investment would be $100 million, including a 93,000-square-foot mixed-use building, two parking decks, two apartment buildings, and a hotel.

On January 14, 2014, the name Union Square Campus was announced. The name "Union" was already used for the neighborhood. Union Street was nearby, and Union Cemetery was created by three area churches. A four-story building was planned by Fall 2016. In April 2014 The Joseph M. Bryan Foundation of Greater Greensboro pledged $4 million toward the nearly $40 million cost of the 103,000-square-foot building. The Cemala Foundation also pledged $1.5 million. Greensboro City Council indicated the city would add $500,000, plus 2 acres and 250 parking spaces.

Union Square Campus construction was expected to start in March or April 2015. A new section of the Downtown Greenway was to start in May 2015.

On September 30, 2014, Bob Isner of South Elm Development Group said the economic benefit for the area could total $500 million.

With Guilford County and GTCC contributing less than hoped, the first phase of the project was changed from a four-story building at Elm and Lee Streets to a three-story building at Arlington and Lee Streets. The more prestigious intersection could then have a higher profile project.

The groundbreaking for the Union Square Campus took place on April 7, 2015. Lee Street was renamed Gate City Boulevard on July 1, 2015.

Union Square opened on August 5, 2016.
