= Union Street =

Union Street may refer to:

== United Kingdom ==
- Union Street, Aberdeen, Scotland
- Union Street, East Sussex, between Ticehurst and Flimwell
- Union Street, London
- Union Street, Plymouth, Devon
- Union Street, Reading, Berkshire

== United States ==
- Union Street (San Francisco)
- Union Street Park, a former baseball ground in Wilmington, Delaware
- Union Street (Boston)
- Union Street station (BMT Fourth Avenue Line), a station of the New York City Subway
- Union Street station (BMT Fifth Avenue Line), a closed station of the New York City Subway

== Other uses ==
- Union Street (album), an album by Erasure
- Union Street (film), a documentary film by Jamila Pomeroy
- Union Street (novel), a novel by Pat Barker
