= List of mountains in Park County, Montana =

There are at least 114 named mountains in Park County, Montana.

- Antelope Butte, 45°50′10″N 110°21′58″W, el. 6,197 feet (1,889 m)
- Antelope Butte, 45°29′59″N 110°41′22″W, el. 6,427 feet (1,959 m)
- Arrow Peak, 45°20′08″N 110°33′12″W, el. 9,108 feet (2,776 m)
- Ash Mountain, 45°06′00″N 110°32′58″W, el. 10,223 feet (3,116 m)
- Baboon Mountain, 45°13′48″N 110°14′03″W, el. 10,236 feet (3,120 m)
- Baker Mountain, 45°32′32″N 110°14′09″W, el. 7,293 feet (2,223 m)
- Bald Knob, 45°32′04″N 110°50′59″W, el. 7,730 feet (2,360 m)
- Bald Mountain, 45°03′33″N 110°37′02″W, el. 8,533 feet (2,601 m)
- Black Mountain, 45°28′17″N 110°27′59″W, el. 10,948 feet (3,337 m)
- Black Mountain, 46°05′05″N 110°25′07″W, el. 9,268 feet (2,825 m)
- Black Mountain, 45°07′55″N 110°55′22″W, el. 8,783 feet (2,677 m)
- Boulder Mountain, 45°22′28″N 110°21′04″W, el. 10,426 feet (3,178 m)
- Buffalo Butte, 45°04′00″N 110°19′09″W, el. 9,386 feet (2,861 m)
- Buffalo Mountain, 45°02′16″N 110°37′20″W, el. 7,697 feet (2,346 m)
- Bull Mountain, 45°02′22″N 110°25′27″W, el. 8,251 feet (2,515 m)
- Cairn Mountain, 45°08′47″N 109°48′01″W, el. 12,221 feet (3,725 m)
- Canyon Mountain, 45°36′04″N 110°40′28″W, el. 8,025 feet (2,446 m)
- Carbonate Mountain, 45°18′26″N 110°16′18″W, el. 9,222 feet (2,811 m)
- Cedar Butte, 45°49′35″N 110°26′11″W, el. 5,420 feet (1,650 m)
- Chico Peak, 45°18′08″N 110°38′15″W, el. 10,157 feet (3,096 m)
- Choke-To-Death Butte, 45°51′53″N 110°21′51″W, el. 6,316 feet (1,925 m)
- Cinnabar Mountain, 45°06′12″N 110°48′14″W, el. 7,109 feet (2,167 m)
- Conical Peak, 46°03′20″N 110°19′54″W, el. 10,702 feet (3,262 m)
- Courthouse Mountain, 45°08′10″N 109°56′40″W, el. 10,495 feet (3,199 m)
- Crevice Mountain, 45°02′38″N 110°35′35″W, el. 8,829 feet (2,691 m)
- Crow Mountain, 45°15′38″N 110°21′09″W, el. 10,676 feet (3,254 m)
- Crown Butte, 45°03′09″N 109°57′42″W, el. 10,207 feet (3,111 m)
- Crystal Cross Mountain, 45°12′20″N 110°57′08″W, el. 7,080 feet (2,160 m)
- Cutoff Mountain, 45°01′55″N 110°06′55″W, el. 10,666 feet (3,251 m)
- Deaf Jim Knob, 45°03′35″N 110°50′44″W, el. 8,156 feet (2,486 m)
- Dexter Point, 45°23′46″N 110°32′54″W, el. 10,105 feet (3,080 m)
- Dome Mountain, 45°11′22″N 110°51′48″W, el. 8,573 feet (2,613 m)
- Electric Peak, 45°00′19″N 110°50′15″W, el. 10,961 feet (3,341 m)
- Elephanthead Mountain, 45°33′08″N 110°25′04″W, el. 9,422 feet (2,872 m)
- Elk Mountain, 45°56′08″N 110°27′47″W, el. 6,378 feet (1,944 m)
- Emigrant Peak, 45°15′47″N 110°42′26″W, el. 10,915 feet (3,327 m)
- Fisher Mountain, 45°03′56″N 109°57′33″W, el. 10,190 feet (3,110 m)
- Glacier Peak, 45°08′59″N 109°50′58″W, el. 12,342 feet (3,762 m)
- Gobblers Knob, 45°50′58″N 110°42′16″W, el. 6,106 feet (1,861 m)
- Granite Peak, 45°09′48″N 109°48′29″W, el. 12,693 feet (3,869 m)
- Granite Peak, 46°02′15″N 110°18′16″W, el. 10,102 feet (3,079 m)
- Green Mountain, 45°19′31″N 110°36′10″W, el. 7,963 feet (2,427 m)
- Hanlon Hill, 45°04′25″N 110°38′34″W, el. 7,244 feet (2,208 m)
- Hellroaring Mountain, 45°00′11″N 110°26′42″W, el. 8,235 feet (2,510 m)
- Henderson Mountain, 45°03′05″N 109°56′42″W, el. 10,272 feet (3,131 m)
- High Mountain, 45°10′42″N 110°46′27″W, el. 8,730 feet (2,660 m)
- Hole-In-The Rock, 45°50′50″N 110°18′40″W, el. 5,446 feet (1,660 m)
- Horse Mountain, 45°04′31″N 110°28′36″W, el. 9,737 feet (2,968 m)
- Horseshoe Mountain, 45°09′07″N 110°05′11″W, el. 9,997 feet (3,047 m)
- Hummingbird Peak, 45°06′40″N 110°17′59″W, el. 10,010 feet (3,050 m)
- Ibex Mountain, 45°59′13″N 110°28′04″W, el. 7,356 feet (2,242 m)
- Iceberg Peak, 45°07′50″N 109°53′16″W, el. 11,525 feet (3,513 m)
- Iddings Peak, 46°00′49″N 110°19′01″W, el. 10,938 feet (3,334 m)
- Iron Mountain, 45°09′16″N 110°18′01″W, el. 10,489 feet (3,197 m)
- Kavanaugh Hills, 46°06′28″N 110°40′01″W, el. 5,689 feet (1,734 m)
- Knowles Peak, 45°18′17″N 110°32′37″W, el. 8,094 feet (2,467 m)
- Lion Mountain, 45°31′23″N 110°20′51″W, el. 7,953 feet (2,424 m)
- Livingston Peak, 45°35′23″N 110°27′34″W, el. 9,295 feet (2,833 m)
- Lookout Mountain, 45°05′43″N 110°13′08″W, el. 9,600 feet (2,900 m)
- Mans Foot Mountain, 45°08′04″N 110°55′15″W, el. 9,413 feet (2,869 m)
- Marten Peak, 45°27′14″N 110°26′33″W, el. 10,541 feet (3,213 m)
- Meldrum Mountain, 45°02′51″N 111°00′57″W, el. 9,468 feet (2,886 m)
- Meridian Peak, 45°01′38″N 110°00′09″W, el. 10,466 feet (3,190 m)
- Middle Mountain, 45°04′49″N 109°51′24″W, el. 9,695 feet (2,955 m)
- Miller Mountain, 45°02′47″N 109°58′39″W, el. 10,410 feet (3,170 m)
- Mineral Hill, 45°04′06″N 110°37′16″W, el. 7,566 feet (2,306 m)
- Mineral Mountain, 45°01′51″N 109°59′53″W, el. 10,469 feet (3,191 m)
- Mineral Mountain, 45°12′53″N 110°36′56″W, el. 10,272 feet (3,131 m)
- Monitor Peak, 45°09′43″N 110°38′34″W, el. 10,394 feet (3,168 m)
- Moolsh Hill, 45°54′13″N 110°33′39″W, el. 5,318 feet (1,621 m)
- Mount Abundance, 45°04′38″N 110°01′16″W, el. 10,098 feet (3,078 m)
- Mount Cowen, 45°23′20″N 110°29′10″W, el. 11,053 feet (3,369 m)
- Mount Delano, 45°31′25″N 110°28′16″W, el. 10,121 feet (3,085 m)
- Mount Fox, 45°07′17″N 109°55′50″W, el. 11,214 feet (3,418 m)
- Mount Greeley, 45°37′09″N 110°16′50″W, el. 7,070 feet (2,150 m)
- Mount McKnight, 45°29′45″N 110°26′58″W, el. 10,298 feet (3,139 m)
- Mount Rae, 45°30′44″N 110°16′11″W, el. 9,193 feet (2,802 m)
- Mount Villard, 45°08′58″N 109°49′56″W, el. 12,254 feet (3,735 m)
- Mount Wallace, 45°11′46″N 110°27′56″W, el. 10,630 feet (3,240 m)
- Mount Wilse, 45°07′55″N 109°52′01″W, el. 11,788 feet (3,593 m)
- Mount Zimmer, 45°07′01″N 109°53′36″W, el. 11,519 feet (3,511 m)
- Mystic Mountain, 45°10′04″N 109°50′26″W, el. 12,093 feet (3,686 m)
- Oregon Mountain, 45°02′40″N 110°34′51″W, el. 8,793 feet (2,680 m)
- Oxide Mountain, 45°04′48″N 109°50′24″W, el. 10,010 feet (3,050 m)
- Palmer Mountain, 45°03′24″N 110°35′12″W, el. 9,275 feet (2,827 m)
- Pine Mountain, 45°34′34″N 110°44′28″W, el. 7,641 feet (2,329 m)
- Rattlesnake Butte, 45°01′13″N 110°39′00″W, el. 6,722 feet (2,049 m)
- Red Mountain, 45°12′18″N 110°47′40″W, el. 8,835 feet (2,693 m)
- Republic Mountain, 45°00′02″N 109°57′20″W, el. 9,987 feet (3,044 m)
- Roundhead Butte, 45°06′55″N 110°14′24″W, el. 10,193 feet (3,107 m)
- Sawtooth Mountain, 45°08′22″N 109°54′03″W, el. 11,476 feet (3,498 m)
- Sawtooth Mountain, 45°06′30″N 110°58′42″W, el. 9,413 feet (2,869 m)
- Scotch Bonnet Mountain, 45°04′24″N 109°57′04″W, el. 10,344 feet (3,153 m)
- Sheep Mountain, 45°45′39″N 110°22′29″W, el. 6,306 feet (1,922 m)
- Sheep Mountain, 45°04′18″N 109°55′44″W, el. 10,607 feet (3,233 m)
- Sheep Mountain, 45°06′47″N 110°42′05″W, el. 10,462 feet (3,189 m)
- Sheep Mountain, 45°05′53″N 111°00′17″W, el. 9,875 feet (3,010 m)
- Sheepherder Peak, 45°10′17″N 110°14′13″W, el. 10,184 feet (3,104 m)
- Shooting Star Mountain, 45°04′34″N 110°57′25″W, el. 9,652 feet (2,942 m)
- Sliding Mountain, 45°11′40″N 110°44′34″W, el. 9,383 feet (2,860 m)
- Sphinx Mountain, 45°09′20″N 110°51′54″W, el. 7,129 feet (2,173 m)
- Sugar Loaf Mountain, 46°05′38″N 110°26′45″W, el. 8,563 feet (2,610 m)
- Sugarloaf Mountain, 45°02′26″N 110°07′57″W, el. 9,524 feet (2,903 m)
- Sunlight Peak, 46°06′18″N 110°23′44″W, el. 10,085 feet (3,074 m)
- Sunset Peak, 45°02′37″N 110°00′15″W, el. 9,504 feet (2,897 m)
- Sunset Peak, 45°02′44″N 110°00′01″W, el. 10,201 feet (3,109 m)
- The Needles, 45°21′51″N 110°18′19″W, el. 10,800 feet (3,300 m)
- The Pyramid, 45°18′26″N 110°23′18″W, el. 10,735 feet (3,272 m)
- Turkey Pen Peak, 45°00′43″N 110°38′22″W, el. 6,985 feet (2,129 m)
- War Eagle Mountain, 45°15′03″N 110°16′32″W, el. 8,973 feet (2,735 m)
- Wilsall Peak, 46°01′36″N 110°20′47″W, el. 10,482 feet (3,195 m)
- Wineglass Mountain, 45°36′03″N 110°38′50″W, el. 7,900 feet (2,400 m)
- Wolf Mountain, 45°09′01″N 109°54′49″W, el. 11,752 feet (3,582 m)
- Wolverine Peak, 45°03′12″N 110°00′34″W, el. 10,479 feet (3,194 m)

== See also ==
- List of mountains in Montana
- List of mountain ranges in Montana
