= Crown Butte =

Mountain in Montana, United States

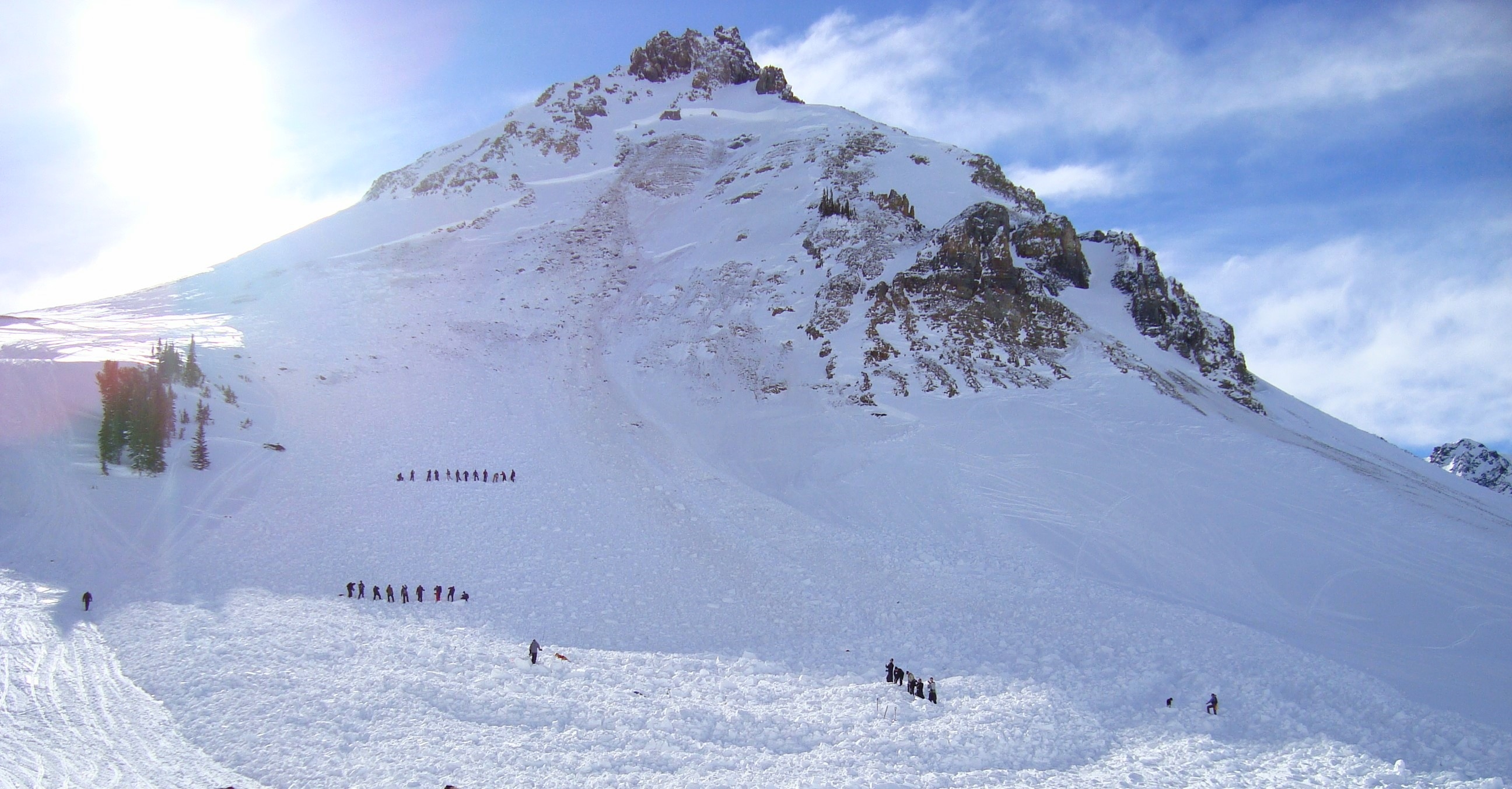
- North aspect, 2009 avalanche search

Highest point
- Elevation: 10,225 ft (3,117 m)
- Prominence: 492 ft (150 m)
- Parent peak: Miller Mountain
- Isolation: 0.77 mi (1.24 km)
- Coordinates: 45°03′11″N 109°57′39″W

Geography
- Location within Montana Location within the United States
- Country: United States
- State: Montana
- County: Park
- Parent range: Beartooth Mountains; Rocky Mountains
- Topo map: USGS Cooke City

Geology
- Rock age: Eocene
- Rock type: Andesite

Crown Butte is a 10,225-foot (3,117-metre) summit in Park County, Montana, United States.

== Description ==
Crown Butte is located 2.7 miles (4.3 km) north-northwest of Cooke City, Montana, in the Beartooth Mountains which are a subrange of the Rocky Mountains. It is set within the New World Mining District and the Custer-Gallatin National Forest. Precipitation runoff from the mountain's west slope drains into headwaters of the Stillwater River, whereas the east slope drains into Miller Creek → Soda Butte Creek → Lamar River. Topographic relief is modest as the summit rises 1,225 feet (373 meters) above Miller Creek in one mile (1.6 km). The mountain's toponym has been officially adopted by the United States Board on Geographic Names. The area around Crown Butte from Cooke City to Scotch Bonnet Mountain offers some of the finest backcountry snowmobiling in the country. On January 17, 2009, a snowmobiler riding on Crown Butte triggered an avalanche resulting in one fatality. On December 31, 2022, one snowmobiler was killed in a very large avalanche on Crown Butte.

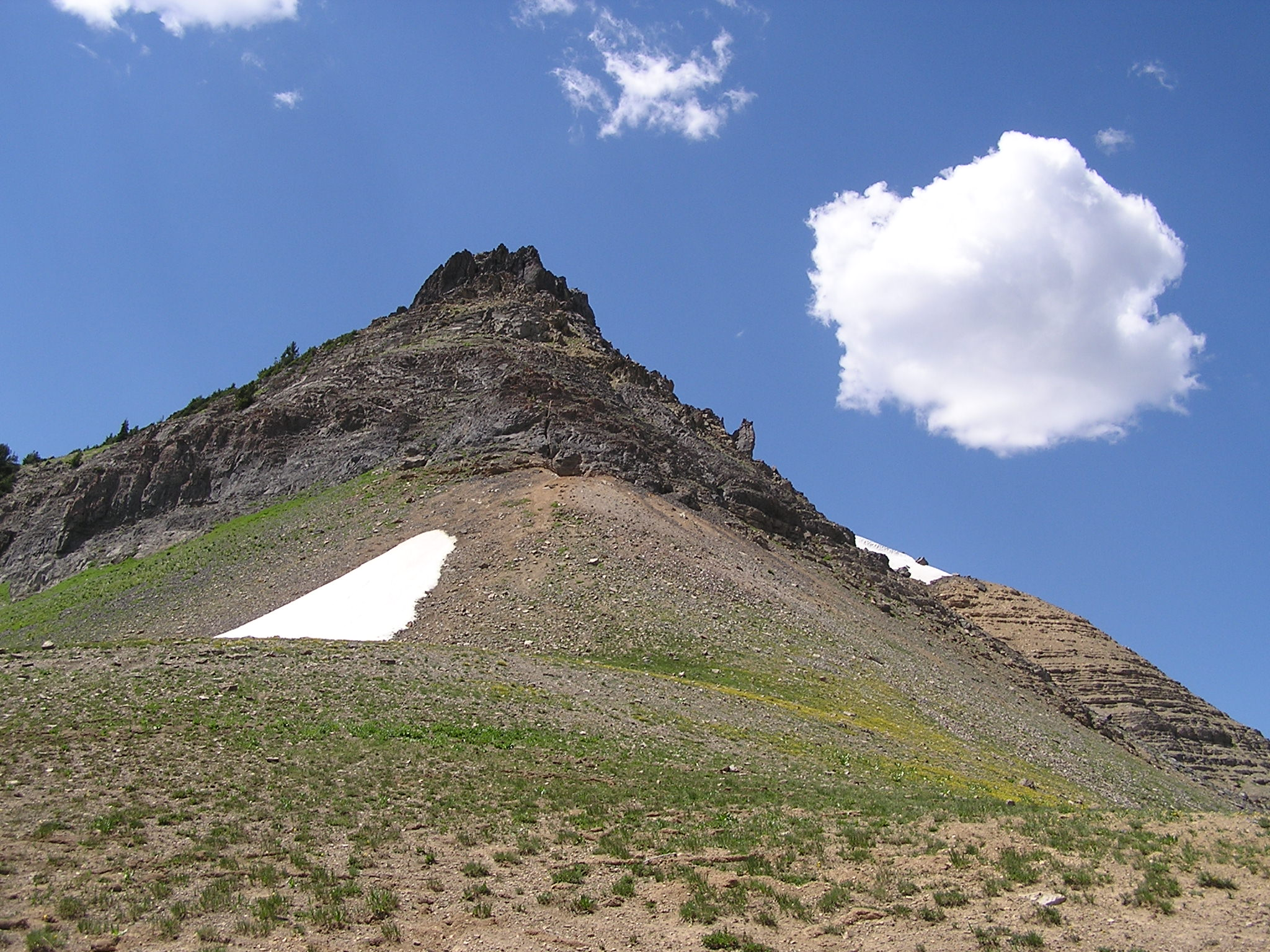
Crown Butte in summer

== Climate ==
Based on the Köppen climate classification, Crown Butte is located in a subarctic climate zone characterized by long, usually very cold winters, and mild summers. Winter temperatures can drop below 0 °F with wind chill factors below −10 °F.

== See also ==
- Geology of the Rocky Mountains
