= Fisher Mountain =

Mountain in Montana, United States

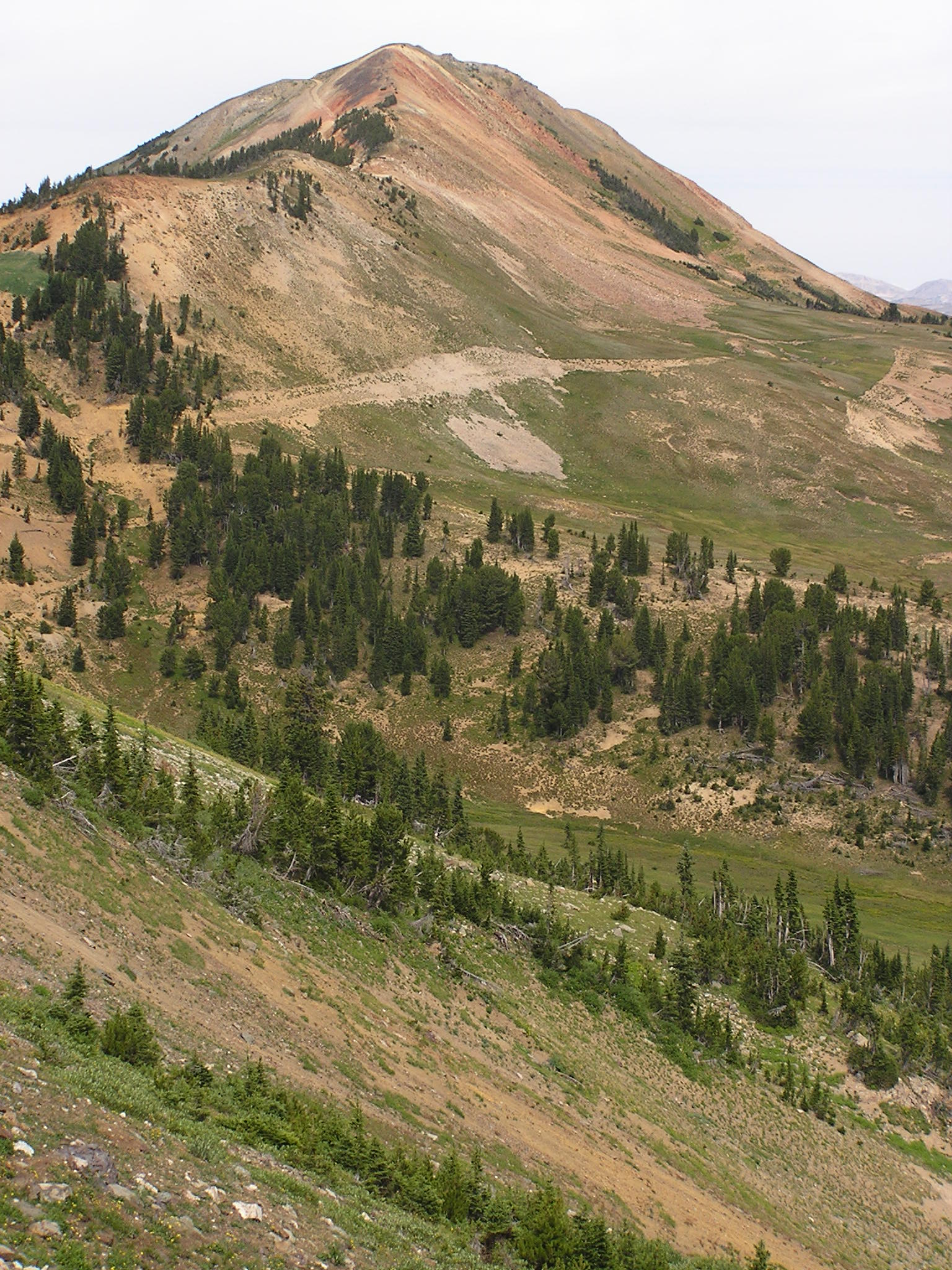
- Southeast aspect

Highest point
- Elevation: 10,246 ft (3,123 m)
- Prominence: 429 ft (131 m)
- Parent peak: Scotch Bonnet Mountain
- Isolation: 0.66 mi (1.06 km)
- Coordinates: 45°03′58″N 109°57′33″W

Geography
- Location within Montana Location within the United States
- Country: United States
- State: Montana
- County: Park
- Parent range: Beartooth Mountains; Rocky Mountains
- Topo map: USGS Cooke City

Geology
- Rock type(s): Limestone, Igneous rock, Breccia

Fisher Mountain is a 10,246-foot (3,123-metre) summit in Park County, Montana, United States.

== Description ==
Fisher Mountain is located 3.5 miles (5.6 km) north of Cooke City, Montana, in the Beartooth Mountains which are a subrange of the Rocky Mountains. It is set within the New World Mining District and the Custer-Gallatin National Forest. Precipitation runoff from the mountain's east slope drains into headwaters of Fisher Creek which is a tributary of the Clarks Fork Yellowstone River, whereas the west slope drains into headwaters of the Stillwater River. Topographic relief is modest as the summit rises 1,750 feet (533 meters) above the Stillwater River in two miles (3.2 km). The mountain is composed of Cambrian limestone and a multiphase network of Eocene felsic porphyritic intrusions and breccia bodies. The mountain's toponym has been officially adopted by the United States Board on Geographic Names.

== Climate ==
Based on the Köppen climate classification, Fisher Mountain is located in a subarctic climate zone characterized by long, usually very cold winters, and mild summers. Winter temperatures can drop below 0 °F with wind chill factors below −10 °F.

== See also ==
- Geology of the Rocky Mountains

== Gallery ==
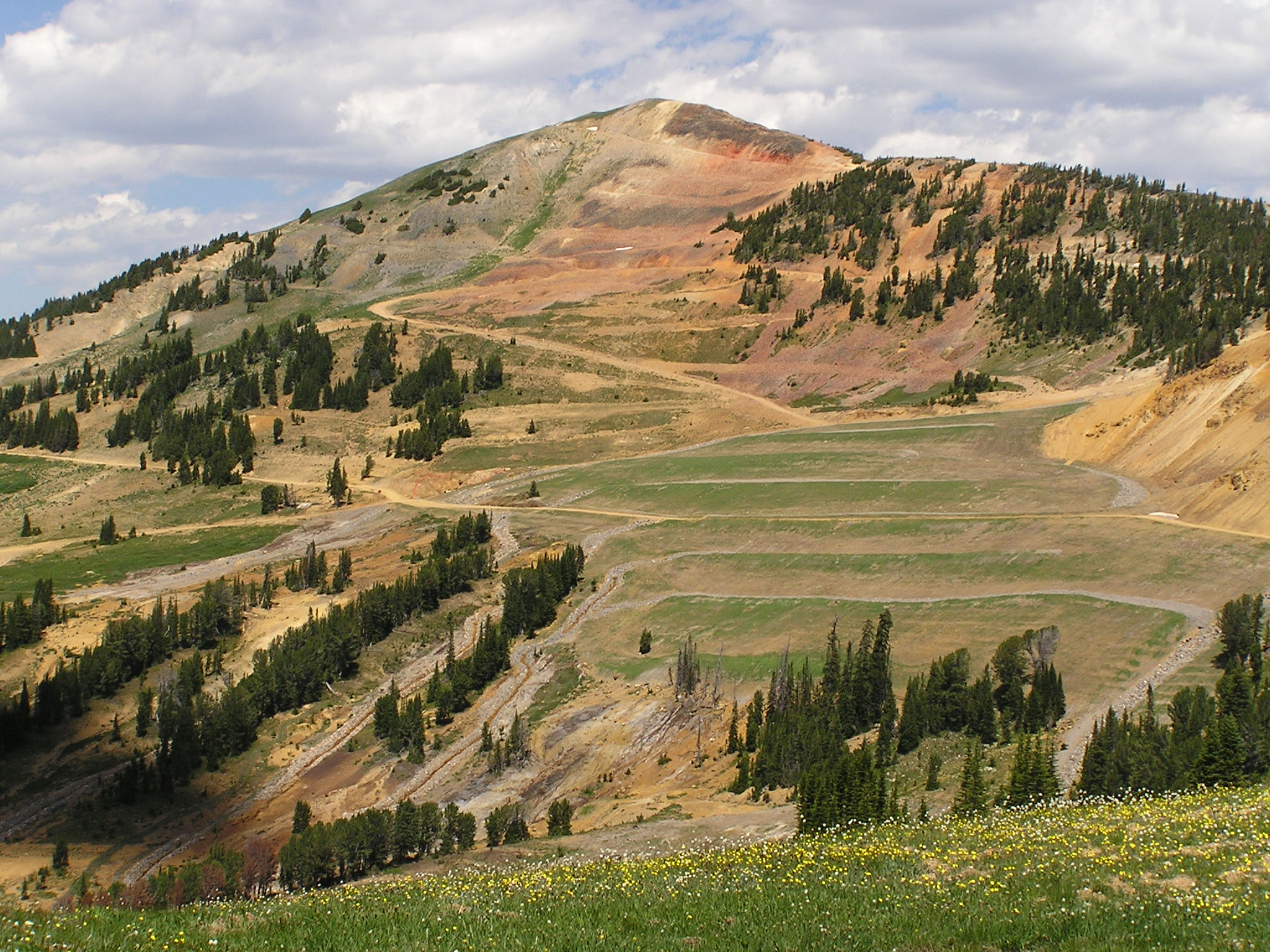
South aspect of Fisher Mountain. In the center is the former site of the historic McLaren open-pit gold mine, last worked in 1953

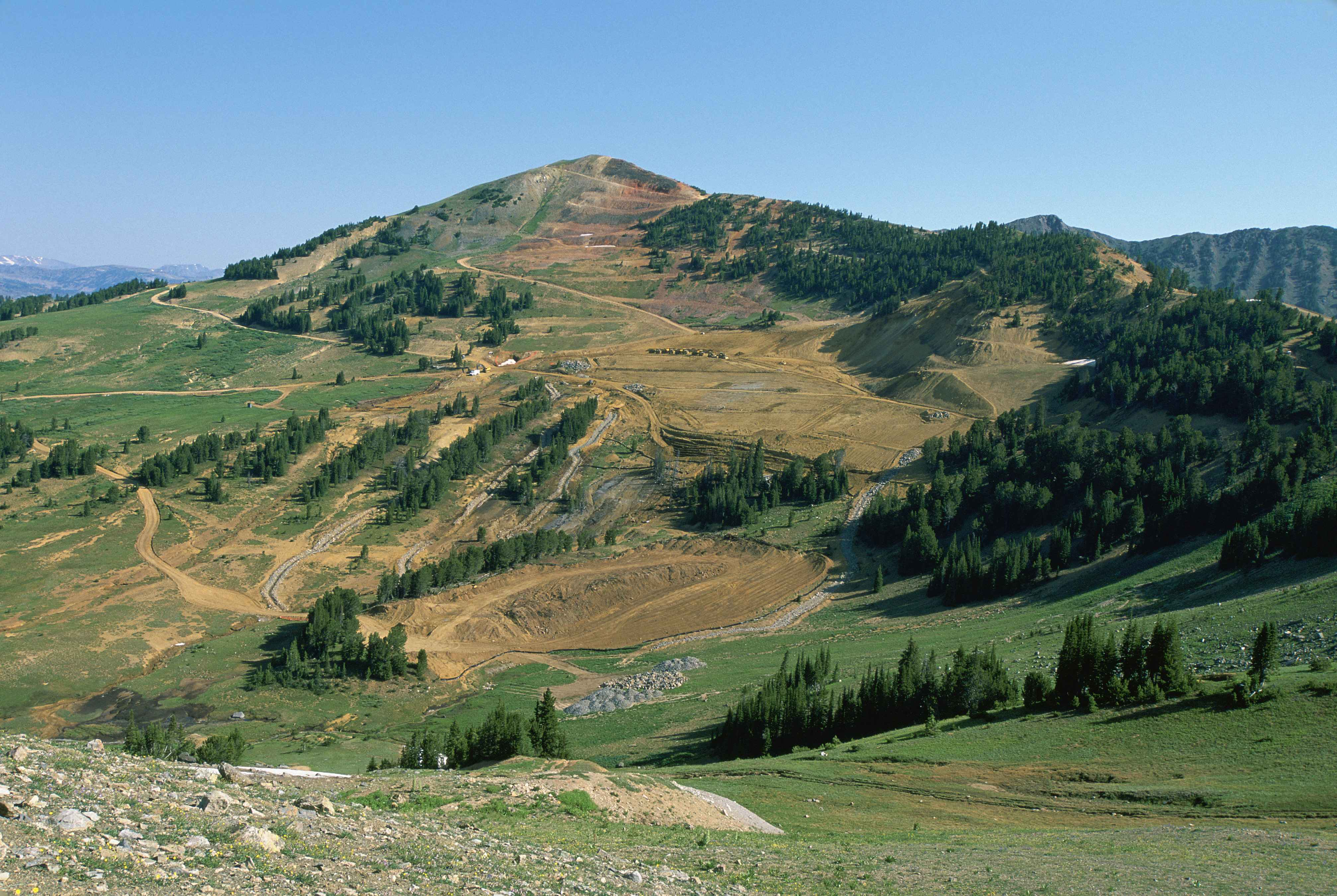
South aspect of Fisher Mountain
