= Henderson Mountain =

Mountain in Montana, United States

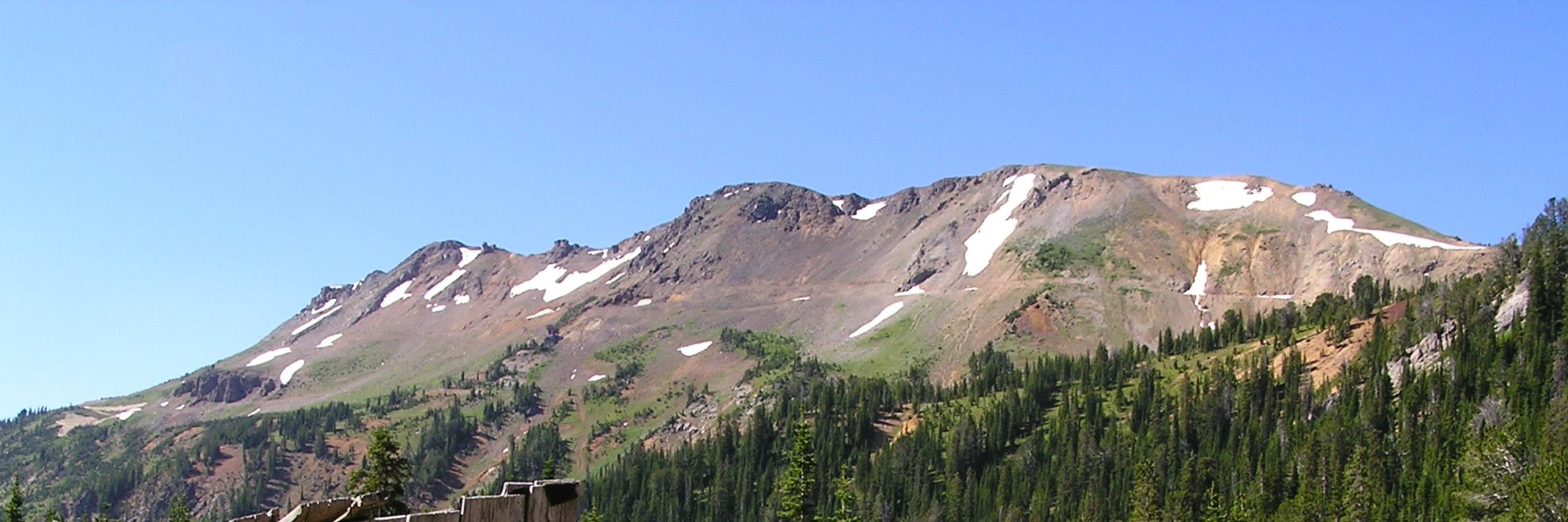
- North aspect

Highest point
- Elevation: 10,343 ft (3,153 m)
- Prominence: 526 ft (160 m)
- Parent peak: Scotch Bonnet Mountain
- Isolation: 1.48 mi (2.38 km)
- Coordinates: 45°03′08″N 109°56′43″W

Naming
- Etymology: Bart Henderson

Geography
- Location within Montana Location within the United States
- Country: United States
- State: Montana
- County: Park
- Parent range: Beartooth Mountains; Rocky Mountains
- Topo map: USGS Cooke City

Geology
- Rock age: 44.0 ± 4.1 million years
- Mountain type: Laccolith
- Rock type(s): Limestone, Igneous rock, Breccia

Henderson Mountain is a 10,343-foot (3,153-metre) summit in Park County, Montana, United States.

== Description ==
Henderson Mountain is located 2.4 miles (3.9 km) north of Cooke City, Montana, in the Beartooth Mountains which are a subrange of the Rocky Mountains. It is set within the New World Mining District and the Custer-Gallatin National Forest. Precipitation runoff from the mountain's north slope drains into Fisher Creek which is a tributary of the Clarks Fork Yellowstone River, whereas the south slope drains into Miller Creek → Soda Butte Creek → Lamar River. Topographic relief is significant as the summit rises nearly 1,400 feet (427 meters) above Fisher Creek in 0.6 miles (0.97 km). The mountain is a laccolith composed of Cambrian limestone, breccia, and Eocene dacite porphyry. Gold was discovered on Henderson Mountain in 1888. In the mid-1990s, Henderson Mountain was the epicenter of legal fighting over plans to mine a billion dollars' worth of gold and silver from the mountain which would threaten nearby Yellowstone National Park. The environmental controversy ended when the US government bought out the mining claim. The mountain's toponym has been officially adopted by the United States Board on Geographic Names, and has been featured in publications since at least 1893. Bart Henderson was one of the four trappers who discovered the New World Mining District in 1869, with the others being Adam Miller, J. H. Moore, and James Gourley. (Miller Mountain is 1.61 miles (2.59 km) west-southwest of Henderson Mountain).

== Climate ==
Based on the Köppen climate classification, Henderson Mountain is located in a subarctic climate zone characterized by long, usually very cold winters, and mild summers. Winter temperatures can drop below 0 °F with wind chill factors below −10 °F.

== See also ==
- Geology of the Rocky Mountains
