= New World Mining District =

Area of mineralization in Park County, Montana, United States

Homestake Mine

The New World Mining District is an area of mineralization that sits within Gallatin National Forest to the northeast of Cooke City and Yellowstone National Park, in Park County, Montana, United States. The district hosts extensive deposits of gold, silver and copper in zones of carbonate replacement. These deposits are the result of Eocene hydrothermal alteration of Cambrian carbonates related to the Absaroka volcanic field. Alteration and mineralization occur primarily within carbonate clasts hosted in a volcanic breccia pipe and in carbonate rocks that lie adjacent to that breccia.

== History ==
Initial exploration of the region occurred in the 1860s with extensive workings developed at the Homestake and Little Daisy Mines between 1904 and 1925. The Homestake mine stopped only a few hundred feet from a high-grade ore body later discovered by Crown Butte Mines (a subsidiary of Hemlo Gold, a Canadian mining company) in 1989–1990 as a result of an intensive drilling campaign. In 1978, Congress specifically considered and then excluded the district from the newly designated Absaroka-Beartooth Wilderness area because of past mining activity and the potential for future mining operations.

== Environmental controversy ==
The New World mining project grew to be one of the largest fights between environmental groups and hard rock mining interests in the 20th century.

The New World district sits only about four miles from the Northeast entrance to Yellowstone National Park at the drainage divide between two creeks both of which eventually feed the Yellowstone River: Miller Creek, on the southwest side of Henderson Mountain, flows to Soda Butte Creek which goes into Yellowstone National Park where it joins the Lamar River then the Yellowstone River; Fisher Creek, on the northeast side of Henderson Mountain, flows into the Clark's Fork of the Yellowstone River which joins the Yellowstone River downstream and well northeast of Yellowstone National Park at Laurel, Montana.

Between 1987 and 1993, Crown Butte Mines (a U.S. subsidiary of the Canadian mining company, Noranda, Inc., who was in a joint venture with Hemlo Gold) completed 856 drill holes comprising nearly 100,000 m of core and reverse circulation drilling and discovered three new ore deposits in the New World district. Already in November, 1990, while drilling was on-going, the economic opportunity of reopening the historic mining district was apparent, and Noranda Exploration-Crown Butte Mines filed for a hard rock mine operating permit with the Montana Dept of State Lands and the U.S. Forest Service to develop a modern underground gold-copper-silver mine. The shaft to access the underground mine was to be located on patented mining claims (private land leased from the landowner), and 85% of the support facilities, including the mill and tailings pond, would be located on Federal land. In 1993, after six reviews of the proposed operating permit, the State of Montana and the U.S. Forest Service finally accepted the permit application and began work on what eventually became a massive draft environmental impact statement (DEIS) for the next three years (1993–1996) that totaled 17 chapters and six appendices that was never completed nor formally approved. Karl Elers, Chairman of Crown Butte Mines, in his testimony before the Subcommittee on Energy and Mineral Resources on May 20, 1997, stated, "Crown Butte was initially informed that the draft EIS would be available in late 1994. This date was not met. In 1994, Crown Butte was advised by the agencies that a draft of the EIS would be issued by the end of the second quarter of 1995. This date was not met and Crown Butte was subsequently advised by the State of Montana that the draft EIS would be released in the fall of 1995. This date was also not met. In March 1996, Crown Butte was advised by the lead agencies that the draft EIS would be released by late spring or early summer of 1996. The draft EIS had not been released by August 12, 1996, when Crown Butte executed the exchange agreement. The EIS process has been suspended pursuant to the terms of the exchange agreement."

Beginning in 1993, as soon as the operating permit was approved, a series of environmental groups that eventually included the Greater Yellowstone Coalition, Sierra Club Legal Defense Fund now called Earthjustice, Beartooth Alliance, Gallatin Wildlife Association, Montana Wildlife Federation, Wyoming Wildlife Federation, Wyoming Outdoor Council, Mineral Policy Center (now Earthworks), National Parks and Conservation Association, American Rivers, Northern Plains Research Council, and local chapters of Trout Unlimited organized to oppose the mine development through a series of newspaper editorials, townhall meetings, and lawsuits, one of which was filed in late 1993 by the Sierra Club Legal Defense Fund on behalf of nine plaintiffs who sued over a violation of the Clean Water Act alleging that Crown Butte Mines was responsible for the acid mine drainage leaking out of the old mines that they had acquired as part of the property. These groups initiated what grew into a national debate on the matter of opening a mine within the Greater Yellowstone Ecosystem "too close" to the National Park and building a tailings impoundment upstream of a National Wild and Scenic River.

Two high-profile political events transpired to help the cause of the environmentalists. On August 25, 1995, President Bill Clinton, taking a break from his vacation, flew over the proposed mine site by helicopter with Mike Finley, Superintendent of Yellowstone National Park, made a speech in the scenic Lamar Valley, and then, within three days, effected a moratorium on patented claims on about 19,000 acres of Federal land in the New World area, a move that did not directly affect the proposed mine but could have affected eventual mine expansion. On December 5, 1995, after having visited the site in September, 1995, the U.N. declared the Yellowstone World Heritage site (so named in 1978) to be "in danger." Even the Wyoming State legislature, otherwise known for being conservative in environmental matters, updated Wyoming's Industrial Siting Act in early 1996 to pronounced a $10/ton surcharge on all mine wastes imported into the state for disposal, an act pointed directly at the likelihood of a New World mine tailings dam failure that would bring thousands of tons of mine waste into Wyoming via the Clark's Fork of the Yellowstone River.

In August, 1996, a settlement was reached between the Greater Yellowstone Coalition, the Clinton administration, and Crown Butte Mines, in which Crown Butte Mines agreed to receive $65M from the Federal government to compensate for their expenditures in the property (e.g., completing 100,000 meters of drilling; undertaking the laborious permitting process) and their loss of unpatented mineral claims and other mineral rights. In addition, Noranda Inc., the parent company, would be freed from the lawsuit over the Clean Water Act, which functions in perpetuity. Of the $65M, $22.5M would be placed in escrow to remediate historic mine workings in the region. The action by the Executive branch of the Federal government to pay cash (as opposed to brokering a land swap) for the mineral interests of a mining company, thereby circumventing the 1872 mining law, was unprecedented, and public opinion decried how the 1872 Mining Law trumped other uses of public lands. Through this agreement, the mineral estate of the Federal portion of the New World Mining district was withdrawn from mineral entry by the Federal government and is now controlled by the U.S. Forest Service (Gallatin National Forest).

The core of the district was covered by patented (privately owned) claims, owned by Margaret Reeb, which were leased to Crown Butte Mines, and these were also part of the settlement with the Federal government in that it was agreed that this land would remain in Margaret Reeb's possession as long as she agreed not to open a new mine on the claims without the express consent of the President and Congress. In 2005, Margaret Reeb died and bequeathed the patented claims to her nephews, Mike and Randy Holland, who then brokered a deal with the Trust for Public Lands to purchase the patented land for $9M over a two-year period. The Trust for Public Lands then sold the land to the U.S. Forest Service, who received funding from the Federal Land and Water Conservation Fund, thereby returning the entirety of the New World mining district to the public trust.

== Visiting the district ==
The New World Mines can be visited by accessing the site through the US Forest Service Daisy or Lulu pass roads that depart from US Highway 212 about one mile east of Cooke City. The site is mostly remediated to limit the effects of acid mine drainage and all mine adits are closed off. A number of historic mining structures remain. The roads are usually accessible from the mid-July through September, but may be snow covered at any times due to the high elevation. High ground clearance vehicles are recommended.

== See also ==
- Fisher Mountain
- Miller Mountain (Park County, Montana)
- Scotch Bonnet Mountain
