= Sheep Mountain (Beartooth Mountains) =

Mountain in Montana, United States

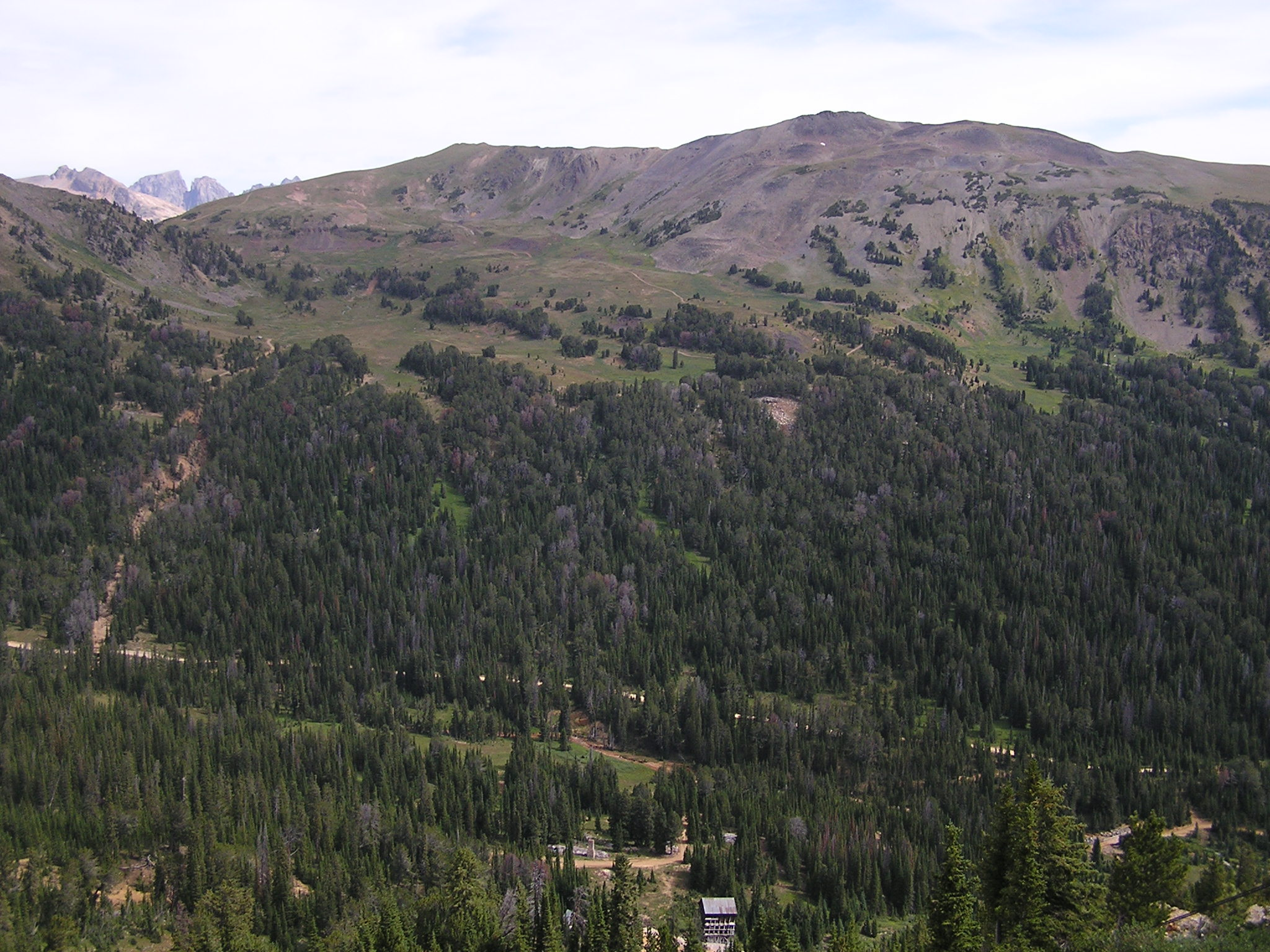
- South aspect

Highest point
- Elevation: 10,608 ft (3,233 m)
- Prominence: 1,070 ft (326 m)
- Parent peak: Iceberg Peak
- Isolation: 3.43 mi (5.52 km)
- Coordinates: 45°04′19″N 109°55′41″W

Geography
- Location within Montana Location within the United States
- Country: United States
- State: Montana
- County: Park
- Parent range: Beartooth Mountains; Rocky Mountains
- Topo map: USGS Cooke City

Sheep Mountain is a 10,608-foot (3,233-metre) summit in Park County, Montana, United States.

== Description ==
Sheep Mountain is located 3.75 miles (6.04 km) north of Cooke City, Montana, in the Beartooth Mountains which are a subrange of the Rocky Mountains. It is set within the New World Mining District and the Custer-Gallatin National Forest. Precipitation runoff from the mountain's northwest slope drains into Goose Creek which is a tributary of the Stillwater River, whereas the other slopes drain into Fisher Creek and Lady of the Lake Creek which together form the headwaters of the Clarks Fork Yellowstone River. Topographic relief is significant as the summit rises approximately 1,650 feet (503 meters) above Fisher Creek in one mile (1.6 km). The area from Cooke City to Sheep Mountain offers some of the finest backcountry snowmobiling in the country. The mountain's toponym has been officially adopted by the United States Board on Geographic Names. This peak should not be confused with the other Sheep Mountain also in Park County, Montana, but in the Absaroka Range.

== Climate ==
Based on the Köppen climate classification, Sheep Mountain is located in a subarctic climate zone characterized by long, usually very cold winters, and mild summers. Winter temperatures can drop below 0 °F with wind chill factors below −10 °F.

== See also ==
- Geology of the Rocky Mountains
