= Sheep Mountain (Gallatin Range, Montana) =

Mountain in Montana, United States

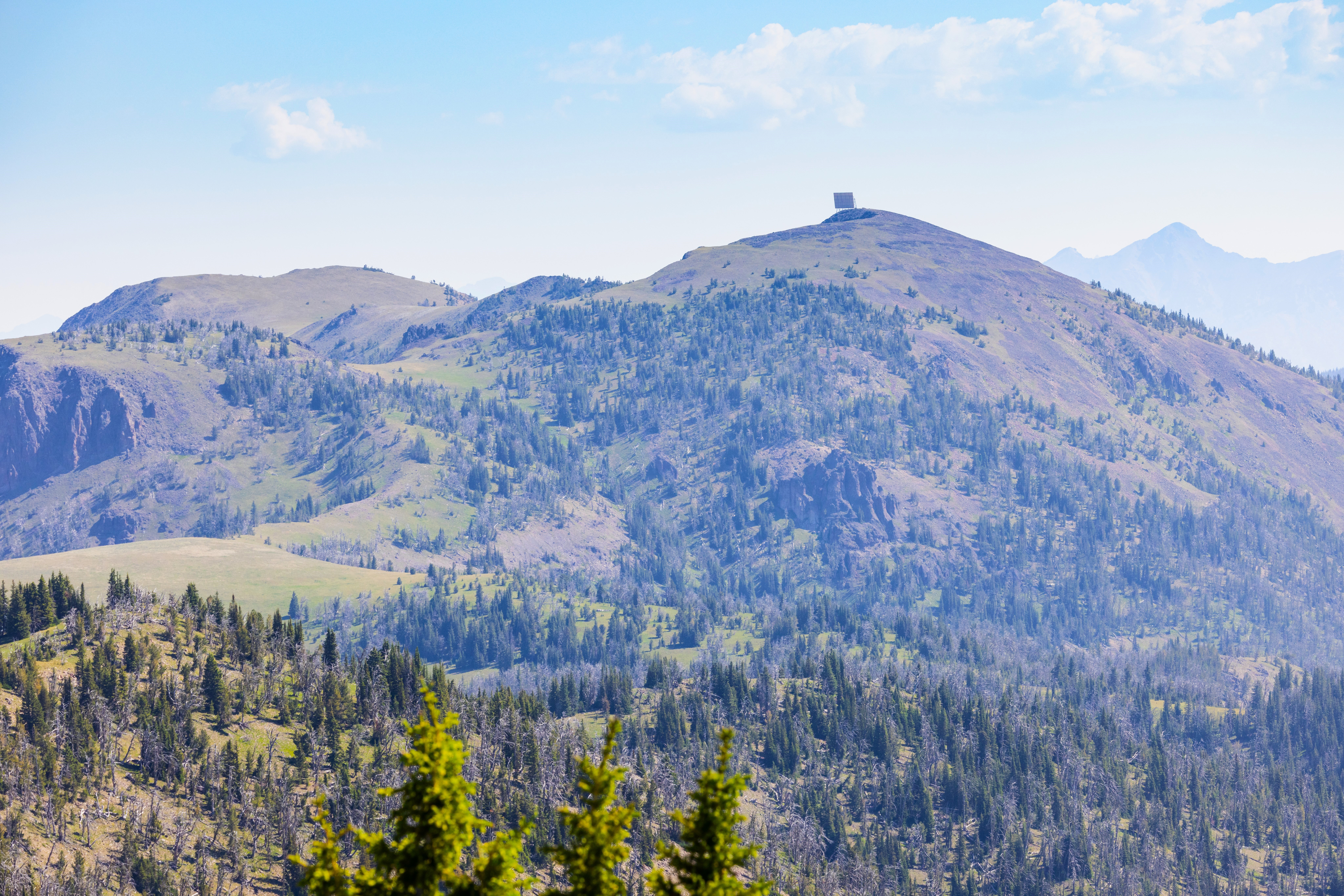
- Southwest aspect

Highest point
- Elevation: 10,097 ft (3,078 m)
- Prominence: 1,574 ft (480 m)
- Parent peak: Ramshorn Peak (10,296 ft)
- Isolation: 5.99 mi (9.64 km)
- Coordinates: 45°05′52″N 110°59′58″W

Naming
- Etymology: Rocky Mountain bighorn sheep

Geography
- Location within Montana Location within the United States
- Country: United States
- State: Montana
- County: Park
- Protected area: Yellowstone National Park
- Parent range: Gallatin Range; Rocky Mountains
- Topo map: USGS Sportsman Lake

Climbing
- Easiest route: class 1 trail

Sheep Mountain is a 10,097-foot (3,078-metre) mountain summit in Park County, Montana, United States.

== Description ==
Sheep Mountain is located 39 miles (63 km) south of Bozeman in the Gallatin Range, which is a subrange of the Rocky Mountains. It is set on the common boundary shared by Yellowstone National Park and the Gallatin National Forest. The mountain is also within the Gallatin Petrified Forest which is one of the largest petrified forests of the Eocene Epoch. Precipitation runoff from the mountain's north slope drains to the Yellowstone River via Tom Miner Creek, whereas the south slope drains to Specimen Creek which is a tributary of the nearby Gallatin River. Topographic relief is significant as the summit rises approximately 1,800 feet (549 meters) above headwaters of North Fork Specimen Creek in one mile (1.6 km). The approach to the remote summit is made from the Sky Rim Trail and Gallatin Skyline Trail. There is a microwave reflector stationed at the summit. The mountain's toponym has been officially adopted by the United States Board on Geographic Names. This peak should not be confused with the other Sheep Mountain also in Park County, Montana, but in the Absaroka Range.

== Climate ==
Based on the Köppen climate classification, Sheep Mountain is located in a subarctic climate zone characterized by long, usually very cold winters, and mild summers. Winter temperatures can drop below 0 °F with wind chill factors below −10 °F.

== See also ==
- Geology of the Rocky Mountains

== Gallery ==
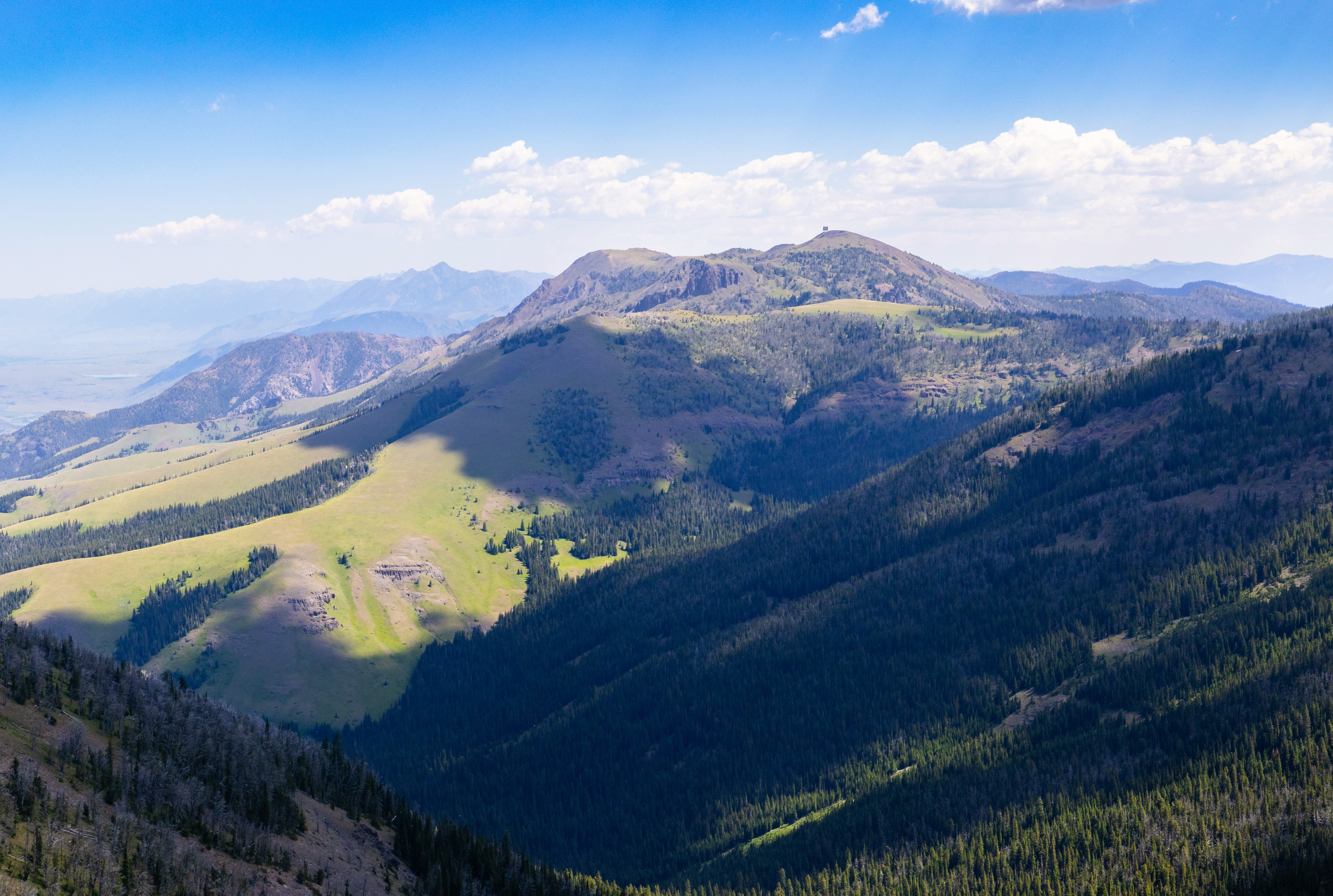
Sheep Mountain viewed from Sky Rim Trail

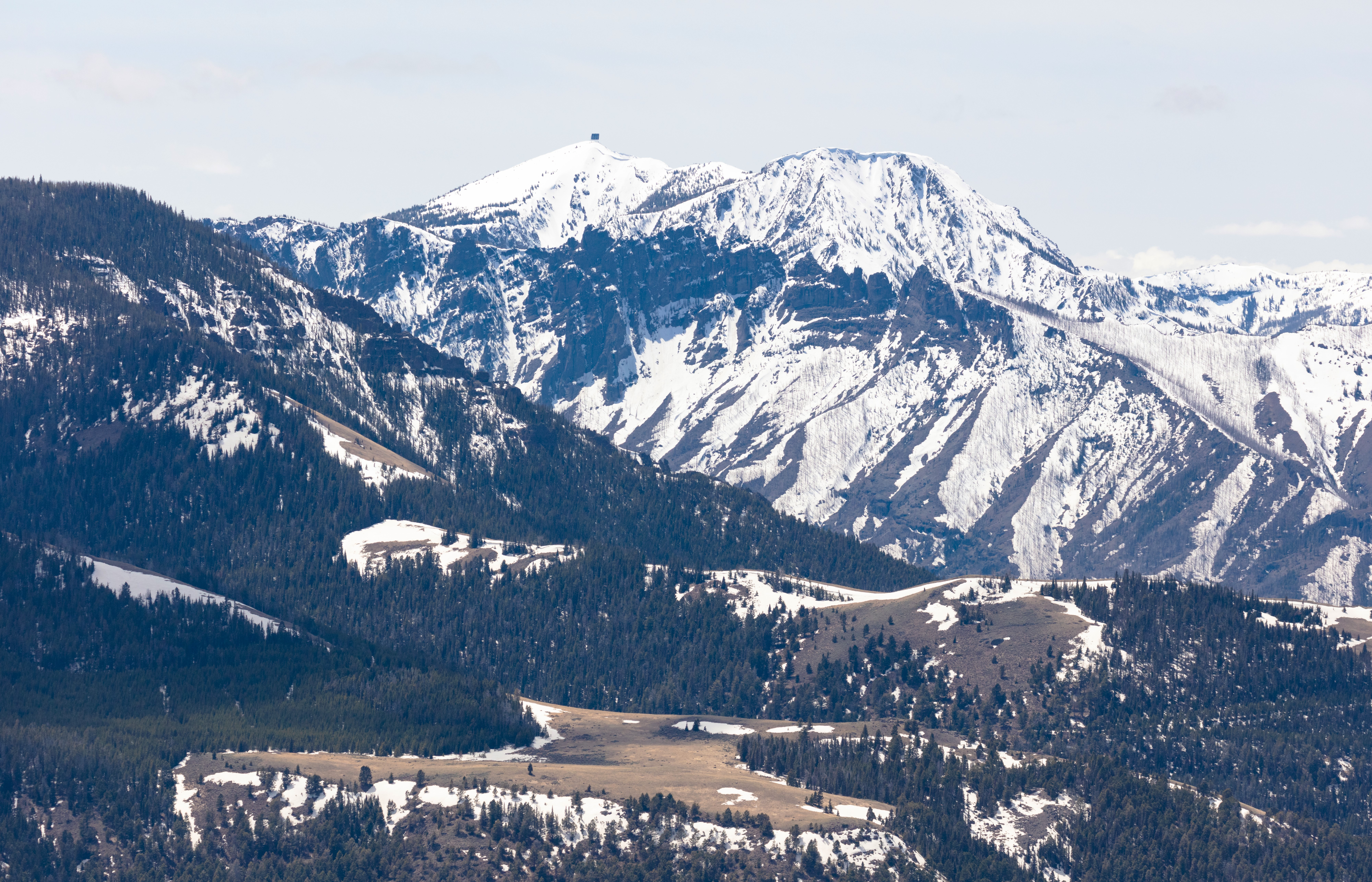
Northeast aspect of Sheep Mountain rises above Sawtooth Mountain
