= Greater Yellowstone Coalition =

- Formation: 1983
- Type: Conservation 501(c)(3) nonprofit
- Headquarters: Bozeman, Montana
- Region served: Greater Yellowstone Ecosystem
- Executive Director: Scott Christensen
- Website: Official website

The Greater Yellowstone Coalition (GYC) is a regional conservation nonprofit organization dedicated to working with all people to protect the lands, waters, and wildlife of the over 20-million-acre (81,000 km^{2}) Greater Yellowstone Ecosystem of Idaho, Montana, and Wyoming.

== History ==
The Greater Yellowstone Coalition was founded in 1983. Its core premise is that “an ecosystem will remain healthy and wild only if it is kept whole.” It aimed to protect one of the last largely intact temperate ecosystems in the United States. Its founding president was conservationist Rick Reese.

GYC has advocated for river and waterway protections, defense of grizzly bear populations and the institution of human-bear coexistence policies, and battles against gold mining in the Paradise Valley north of Yellowstone National Park. They have also pushed for improved land use plans and protections for wild trout in the Greater Yellowstone Area.

In addition, the GYC led the fight against the New World gold-silver-copper mine, which was proposed to be sited only about four miles from the northeast entrance to Yellowstone National Park, during the early 1990s.

== Description ==
The organization focuses land around Yellowstone National Park and Grand Teton National Park, including Montana, Wyoming and Idaho. It covers over 20 million acres (34,000 square miles) with Yellowstone National Park at its center. This area is used recreationally by large numbers of people every year, which “puts strains on its environment, wildlife and infrastructure." The organization seeks to protect the lands, waters and wildlife of the 20-million-acre (81,000 km2) Greater Yellowstone Ecosystem. It advocates for “conservation, sound science, and protective management.”

The main office of the GYC is based in Bozeman, Montana, and the organization has other offices in Jackson, WY, Cody, WY and Idaho Falls, ID. Its current director is conservationist Scott Christensen.

The Montana State University Library holds the papers of the Greater Yellowstone Coalition from 1984 to 2018.
