= Silesia, Montana =

Unincorporated community in Montana, United States

- Census-designated place
- Location within Montana Location within the United States
- Coordinates: 45°33′21″N 108°50′12″W
- Country: United States
- State: Montana
- County: Carbon

Area
  - Total: 1.93 sq mi (4.99 km^{2})
  - Land: 1.86 sq mi (4.83 km^{2})
  - Water: 0.062 sq mi (0.16 km^{2})
- Elevation: 3,383 ft (1,031 m)

Population (2020)
  - Total: 103
  - Density: 55/sq mi (21.3/km^{2})
- Time zone: UTC-7 (Mountain (MST))
  - Summer (DST): UTC-6 (MDT)
- ZIP code: 59041
- Area code: 406
- GNIS feature ID: 2583846

Silesia is a census-designated place and unincorporated community in Carbon County, Montana, United States. As of the 2020 census, Silesia had a population of 103.

Clarks Fork Yellowstone River flows to the east of town. It is about 10 miles from Laurel.

== History ==
The town was named after the region of Silesia in Central Europe by Julius Lehrkind, an immigrant from Silesia. Silesia's post office was established on May 18, 1900, with Charles Buzzetti as its first postmaster.

== Demographics ==
Historical population
| Census | Pop. | Note | %± |
|---|---|---|---|
| 2020 | 103 | | — |
U.S. Decennial Census
