= Miller Mountain (Park County, Montana) =

Mountain in Montana, United States

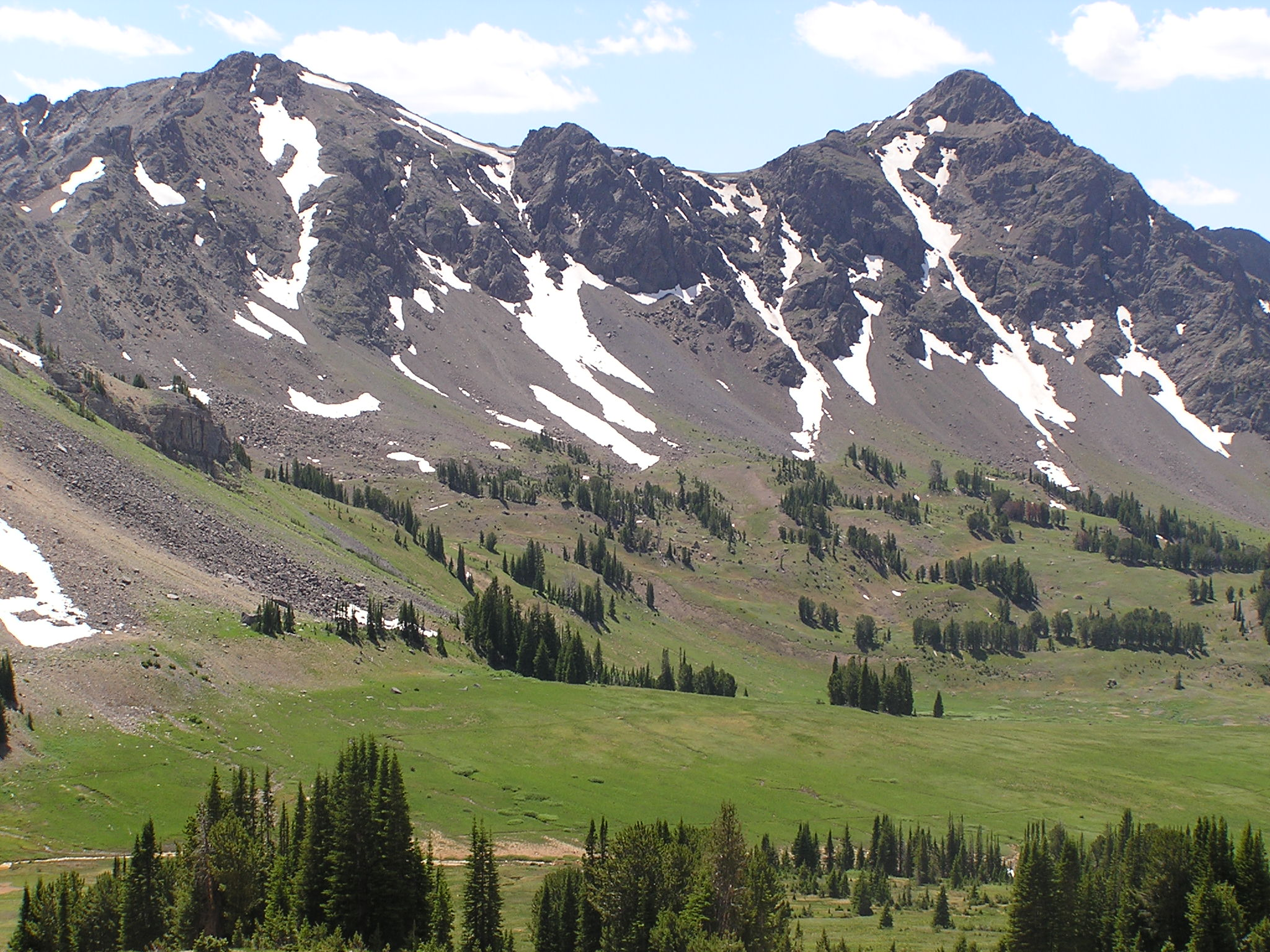
- North aspect, summit to right

Highest point
- Elevation: 10,494 ft (3,199 m)
- Prominence: 777 ft (237 m)
- Parent peak: Sheep Mountain
- Isolation: 1.64 mi (2.64 km)
- Coordinates: 45°02′48″N 109°58′37″W

Naming
- Etymology: Adam "Horn" Miller

Geography
- Location within Montana Location within the United States
- Country: United States
- State: Montana
- County: Park
- Parent range: Beartooth Mountains; Rocky Mountains
- Topo map: USGS Cooke City

Geology
- Rock type(s): gabbro, breccia, monzonite

Miller Mountain is a 10,494-foot (3,199-metre) summit in Park County, Montana, United States.

== Description ==
Miller Mountain is located 2.85 miles (4.59 km) northwest of Cooke City, Montana, in the Beartooth Mountains which are a subrange of the Rocky Mountains. It is set within the New World Mining District and the Custer-Gallatin National Forest. Precipitation runoff from the mountain's north slope drains into headwaters of the Stillwater River, whereas the south slope drains into Sheep Creek → Soda Butte Creek → Lamar River. Topographic relief is significant as the summit rises 2,000 feet (610 meters) above Sheep Creek in one mile (1.6 km). The mountain is composed of gabbro, Miocene breccia, and Eocene monzonite porphyry. The mountain's toponym has been officially adopted by the United States Board on Geographic Names, and has been featured in publications since at least 1911. The mountain is named after Adam "Horn" Miller (1839–1913), who was one of the four trappers who discovered and named the New World Mining District in 1869, with the others being Bart Henderson, J. H. Moore, and James Gourley. Adam Miller staked a claim that he called Shoo Fly Mine at the 9,300-foot-elevation level on the south slope of this mountain which would bear his name. From 1878 through the late 1880s, the Shoo Fly produced gold, copper, and lead-silver ore, but it closed in 1893 to never reopen. (Henderson Mountain is 1.61 miles (2.59 km) east-northeast of Miller Mountain).

== Climate ==
Based on the Köppen climate classification, Miller Mountain is located in a subarctic climate zone characterized by long, usually very cold winters, and mild summers. Winter temperatures can drop below 0 °F with wind chill factors below −10 °F.

== See also ==
- Geology of the Rocky Mountains
