= Mount Rae (Montana) =

Mountain in Montana, United States

- Location within Montana

Highest point
- Elevation: 9,240 ft (2,820 m) NAVD 88
- Prominence: 800 ft (240 m)
- Listing: Mountains of Park County; Mountains of Montana
- Coordinates: 45°30′40″N 110°16′17″W

Geography
- Country: United States
- State: Montana
- County: Park County
- Parent range: Absaroka Range
- Topo map: USGS Mount Rae

Mount Rae is a mountain located in Park County, Montana, United States.
