= Livingston Peak =

Mountain in Montana, United States

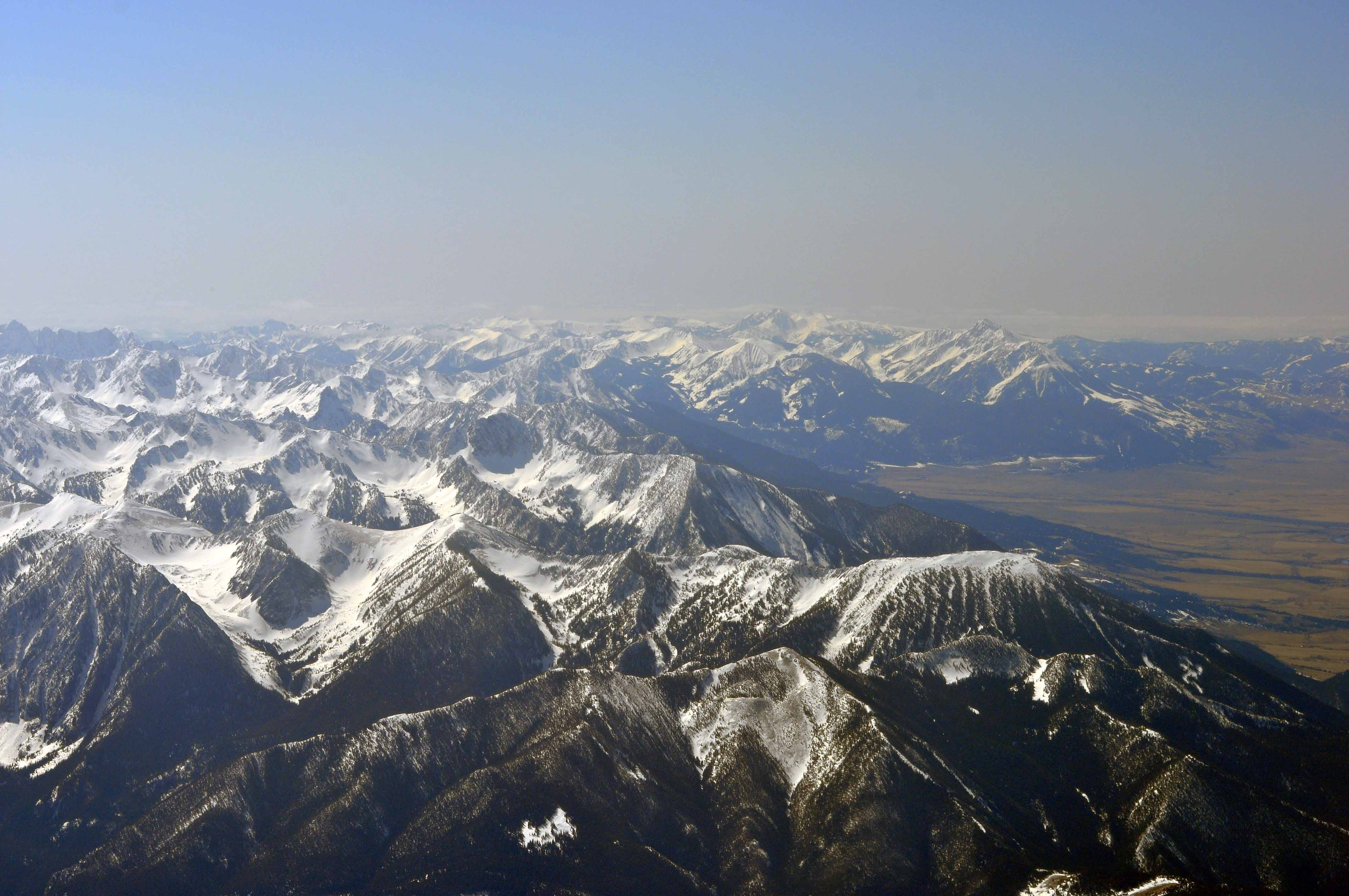
- Livingston Peak in foreground right

Highest point
- Elevation: 9,295 ft (2,833 m)
- Coordinates: 45°35′23″N 110°27′34″W

Geography
- Location within Montana
- Location: Park County, Montana
- Parent range: Absaroka Range

Livingston Peak, el. 9,295 feet (2,833 m) is a mountain peak in the Absaroka Range near Livingston, Montana. The peak is located within the Gallatin National Forest and the Absaroka-Beartooth Wilderness.
