= Choke-To-Death Butte =

Mountain in Montana, United States

Coordinates: 45°51′53″N 110°21′51″W

Choke-To-Death Butte is a summit in Park County, Montana, in the United States. With an elevation of 6,316 feet (1,925 m), Choke-To-Death Butte is the 1796th highest summit in the state of Montana.
