= Scotch Bonnet Mountain =

Mountain in Montana, United States

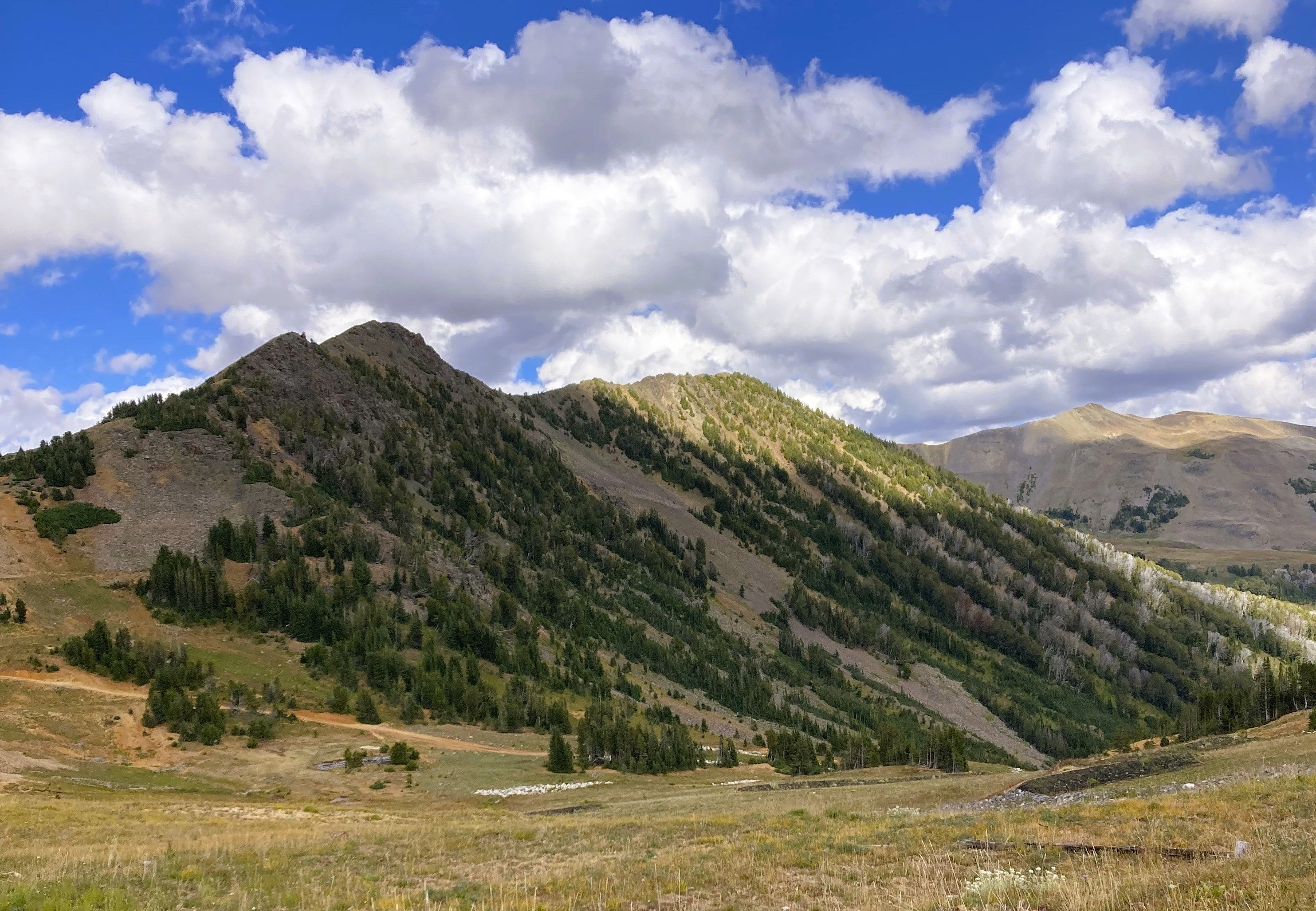
- West aspect

Highest point
- Elevation: 10,385 ft (3,165 m)
- Prominence: 511 ft (156 m)
- Parent peak: Sheep Mountain
- Isolation: 1.12 mi (1.80 km)
- Coordinates: 45°04′25″N 109°57′01″W

Geography
- Location within Montana Location within the United States
- Country: United States
- State: Montana
- County: Park
- Parent range: Beartooth Mountains; Rocky Mountains
- Topo map: USGS Cooke City

Geology
- Rock age: 55.3 ± 0.7 million years
- Rock type(s): Diorite, Monzodiorite

Scotch Bonnet Mountain is a 10,385-foot (3,165-metre) summit in Park County, Montana, United States.

== Description ==
Scotch Bonnet Mountain is located four miles (6.4 km) north of Cooke City, Montana, in the Beartooth Mountains which are a subrange of the Rocky Mountains. It is set within the New World Mining District and the Custer-Gallatin National Forest. Precipitation runoff from the mountain's south slope drains into headwaters of Fisher Creek which is a tributary of the Clarks Fork Yellowstone River, whereas the north slope drains into Goose Creek which is a tributary of the nearby Stillwater River. Topographic relief is significant as the summit rises approximately 1,760 feet (536 meters) above Goose Creek in 1.2 miles (1.9 km). The mountain's rock composition ranges from diorite to monzodiorite and is commonly propylitized. The Montana Scotch Bonnet Copper and Gold Mining Company worked this area near Lulu Pass in the early 1900s and the mountain's toponym has been officially adopted by the United States Board on Geographic Names. The area from Cooke City to Scotch Bonnet Mountain offers some of the finest backcountry snowmobiling in the country. On January 3, 2010, two snowmobilers riding on the south face of Scotch Bonnet Mountain triggered an avalanche resulting in one fatality. An avalanche on the mountain killed two snowmobilers on December 27, 2021.

== Climate ==
Based on the Köppen climate classification, Scotch Bonnet Mountain is located in a subarctic climate zone characterized by long, usually very cold winters, and mild summers. Winter temperatures can drop below 0 °F with wind chill factors below −10 °F.

== See also ==
- Geology of the Rocky Mountains
