= Cairn Mountain =

Mountain in United States of America

- Location within Montana Location within the United States

Highest point
- Elevation: 12,205 ft (3,720 m)
- Prominence: 840 ft (260 m)
- Coordinates: 45°08′47″N 109°48′01″W

Geography
- Location: Park County, Montana, U.S.
- Parent range: Beartooth Mountains
- Topo map: USGS Granite Peak

Cairn Mountain (12,205 feet (3,720 m)) is in the Beartooth Mountains in the U.S. state of Montana. The peak is in the Absaroka-Beartooth Wilderness in Custer National Forest. Cairn Mountain is 1.24 mi (2.00 km) south of Granite Peak, the tallest mountain in Montana.
