= Mystic Mountain (Montana) =

Mountain in Montana, United States

- Location within Montana Location within the United States

Highest point
- Elevation: 12,085 ft (3,684 m)
- Prominence: 520 ft (160 m)
- Coordinates: 45°10′04″N 109°50′26″W

Geography
- Location: Park County, Montana, U.S.
- Parent range: Beartooth Mountains
- Topo map: USGS Granite Peak

Mystic Mountain (12,085 feet (3,684 m)) is in the Beartooth Mountains in the U.S. state of Montana. The peak is in the Absaroka-Beartooth Wilderness in Custer National Forest and approximately 1.5 mi (2.4 km) west of Granite Peak.
