= Ramshorn Peak (Montana) =

Mountain in Montana, United States

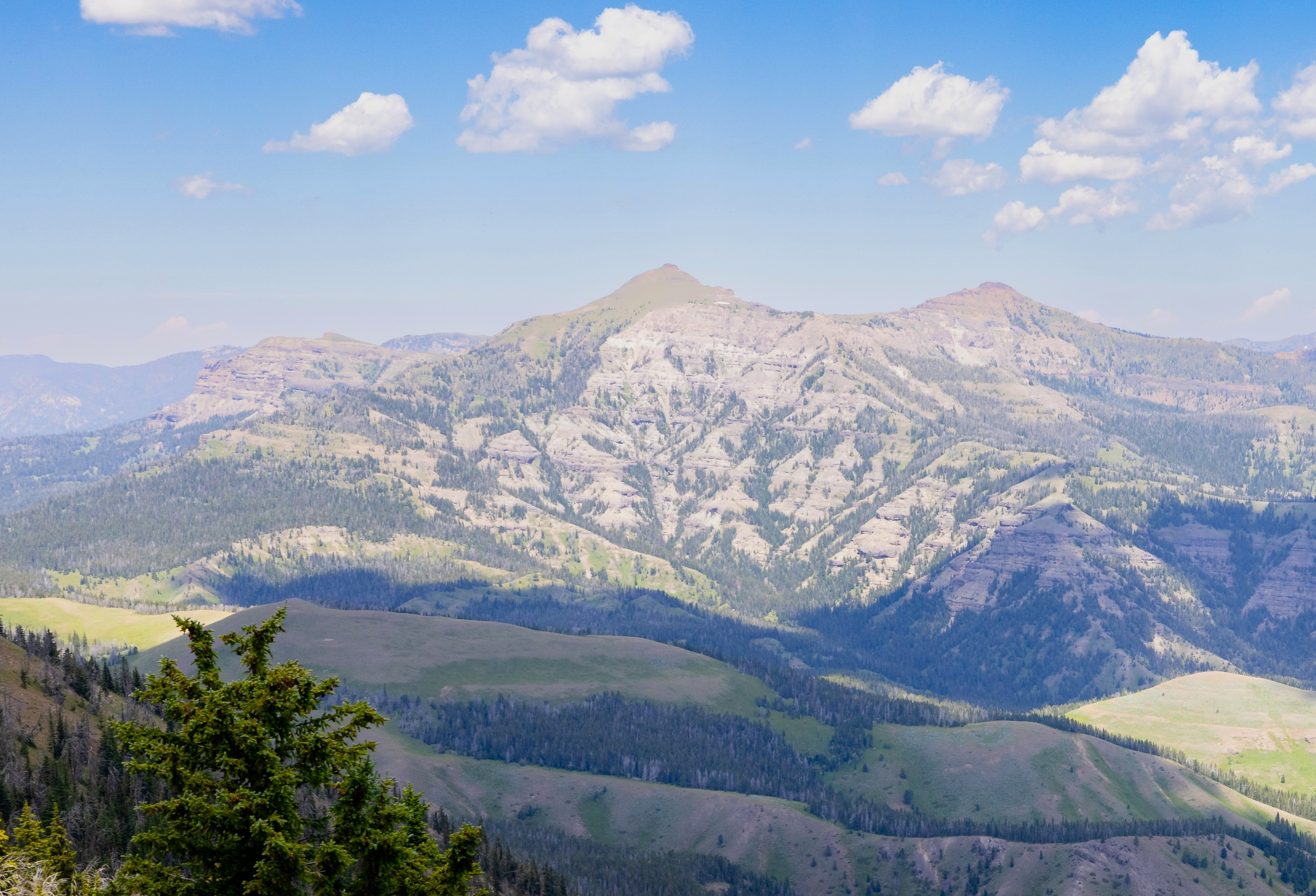
- South aspect, centered

Highest point
- Elevation: 10,296 ft (3,138 m)
- Prominence: 1,216 ft (371 m)
- Parent peak: Hyalite Peak (10,299 ft)
- Isolation: 15.56 mi (25.04 km)
- Coordinates: 45°09′19″N 111°05′33″W

Geography
- Location within Montana Location within the United States
- Country: United States
- State: Montana
- County: Gallatin
- Protected area: Gallatin National Forest
- Parent range: Gallatin Range; Rocky Mountains
- Topo map: USGS Ramshorn Peak

Climbing
- Easiest route: class 1

Ramshorn Peak is a 10,296-foot (3,138-metre) mountain summit in Gallatin County, Montana, United States.

== Description ==
Ramshorn Peak is located 35 miles (56 km) south of Bozeman in the Gallatin National Forest and the Hyalite Porcupine Buffalo Horn Wilderness Study Area. The peak is the eighth-highest peak in the Gallatin Range which is a subrange of the Rocky Mountains. Precipitation runoff from the mountain's west slope drains to the Gallatin River via Buffalo Horn Creek, whereas the other slopes drain into tributaries of the Yellowstone River. Topographic relief is significant as the summit rises over 2,100 feet (640 meters) above Buffalo Horn Creek in one mile (1.6 km). Petrified wood can be found on the peak as the mountain is set within the Gallatin Petrified Forest which is one of the largest petrified forests of the Eocene Epoch. The mountain's toponym has been officially adopted by the United States Board on Geographic Names.

== Climate ==
Based on the Köppen climate classification, Ramshorn Peak is located in a subarctic climate zone characterized by long, usually very cold winters, and mild summers. Winter temperatures can drop below 0 °F with wind chill factors below −10 °F.

== See also ==
- Geology of the Rocky Mountains
