= Sheep Mountain (Park County, Montana) =

Mountain in Montana, United States

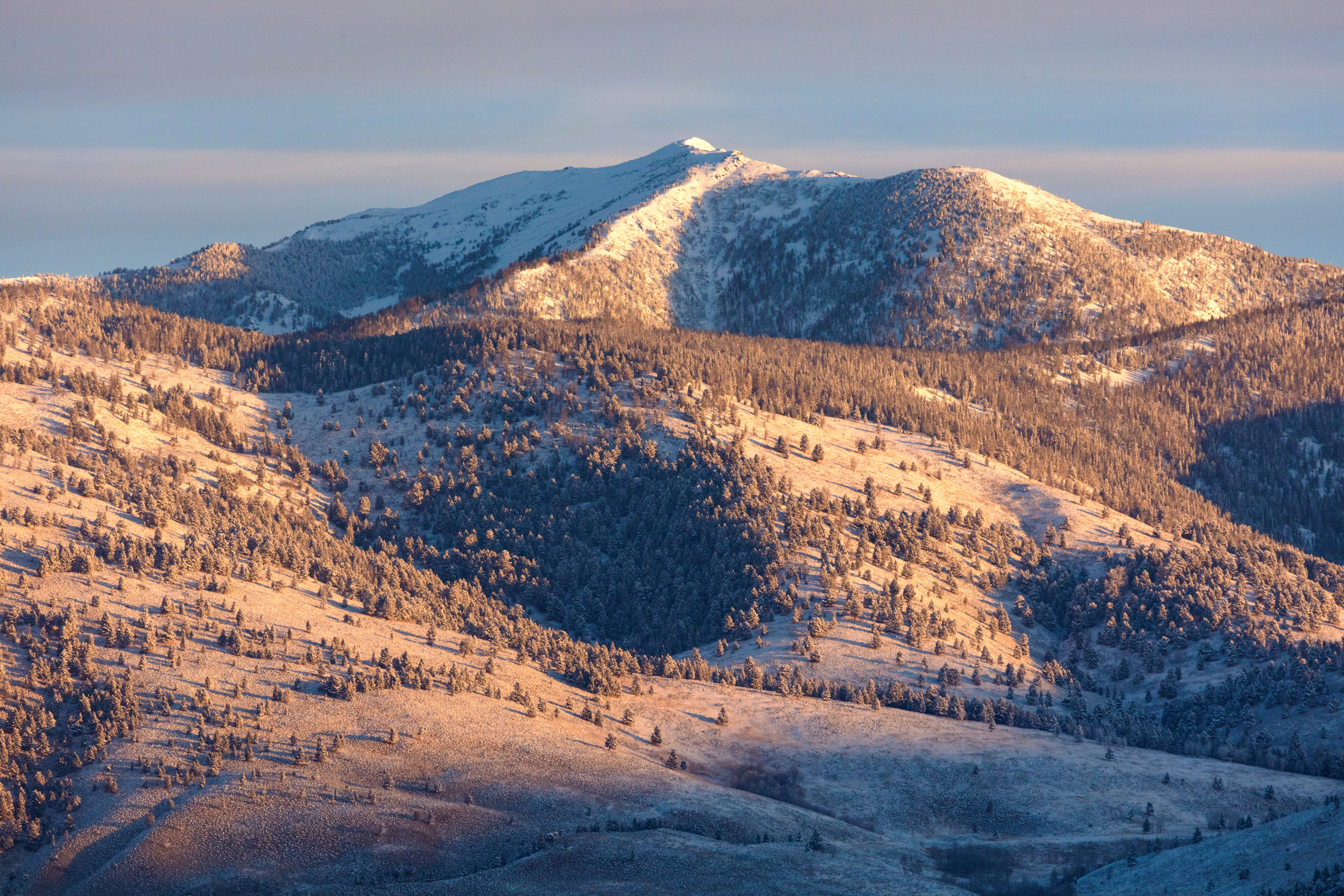
- South aspect

Highest point
- Elevation: 10,552 ft (3,216 m)
- Prominence: 1,754 ft (535 m)
- Parent peak: Electric Peak (10,969 ft)
- Isolation: 10.02 mi (16.13 km)
- Listing: Highest major summits of the US; Mountain peaks of Montana
- Coordinates: 45°06′47″N 110°42′02″W

Geography
- Location within Montana Location within the United States
- Country: United States
- State: Montana
- County: Park
- Protected area: Absaroka–Beartooth Wilderness
- Parent range: Absaroka Range; Rocky Mountains
- Topo map: USGS Gardiner

Geology
- Rock type(s): Schist and Hornfels

Sheep Mountain is a 10,552-foot (3,216-metre) mountain summit in Park County, Montana, United States.

== Description ==
Sheep Mountain is located six miles (9.7 km) north of Gardiner, Montana, in the northern Absaroka Range, which is a subrange of the Rocky Mountains. It is set in the Absaroka–Beartooth Wilderness on land managed by Gallatin National Forest. Precipitation runoff from the mountain drains into tributaries of the Yellowstone River. Topographic relief is significant as the summit rises 2,000 feet (610 meters) above Bassett Creek in one mile (1.6 km) and over 5,400 feet (1,646 meters) above the Yellowstone River in four miles (6.4 km). The mountain's toponym has been officially adopted by the United States Board on Geographic Names. This peak should not be confused with the other Sheep Mountain also in Park County, Montana, but in the Gallatin Range.

== Climate ==
Based on the Köppen climate classification, Sheep Mountain is located in a subarctic climate zone characterized by long, usually very cold winters, and mild summers. Winter temperatures can drop below 0 °F with wind chill factors below −10 °F.

== See also ==
- Geology of the Rocky Mountains

== Gallery ==
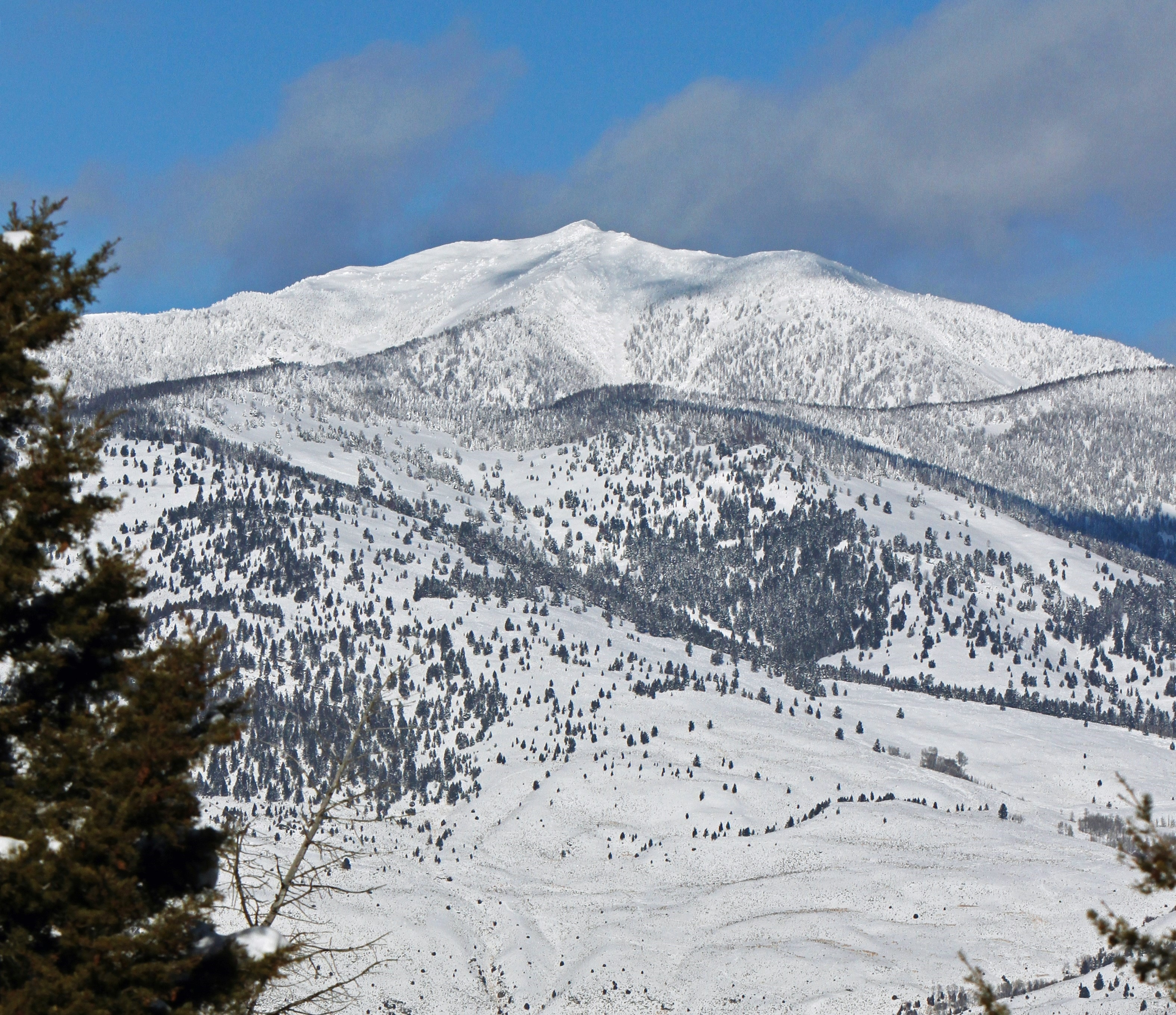
South aspect

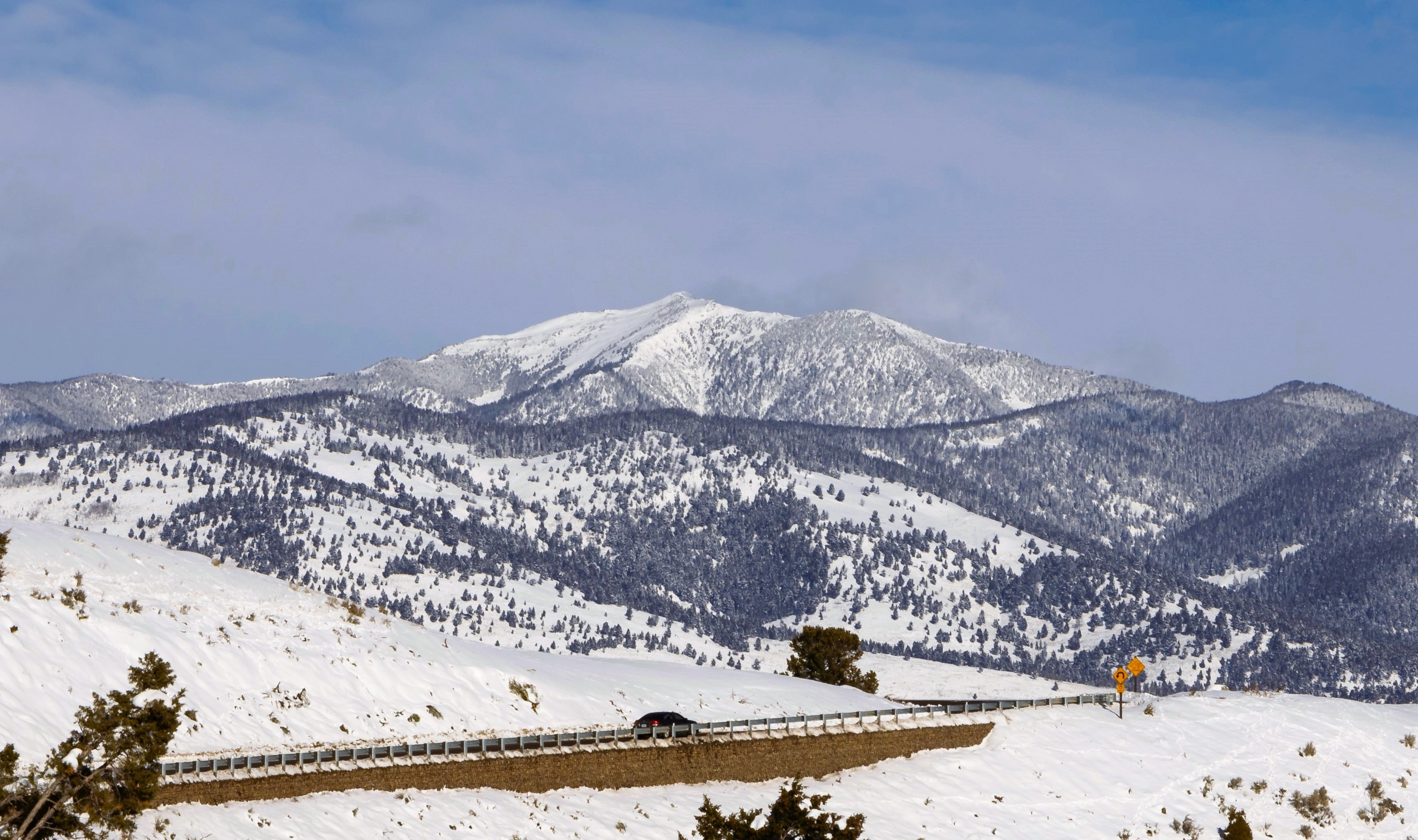
Sheep Mountain viewed from Yellowstone National Park
