= Soda Butte Creek =

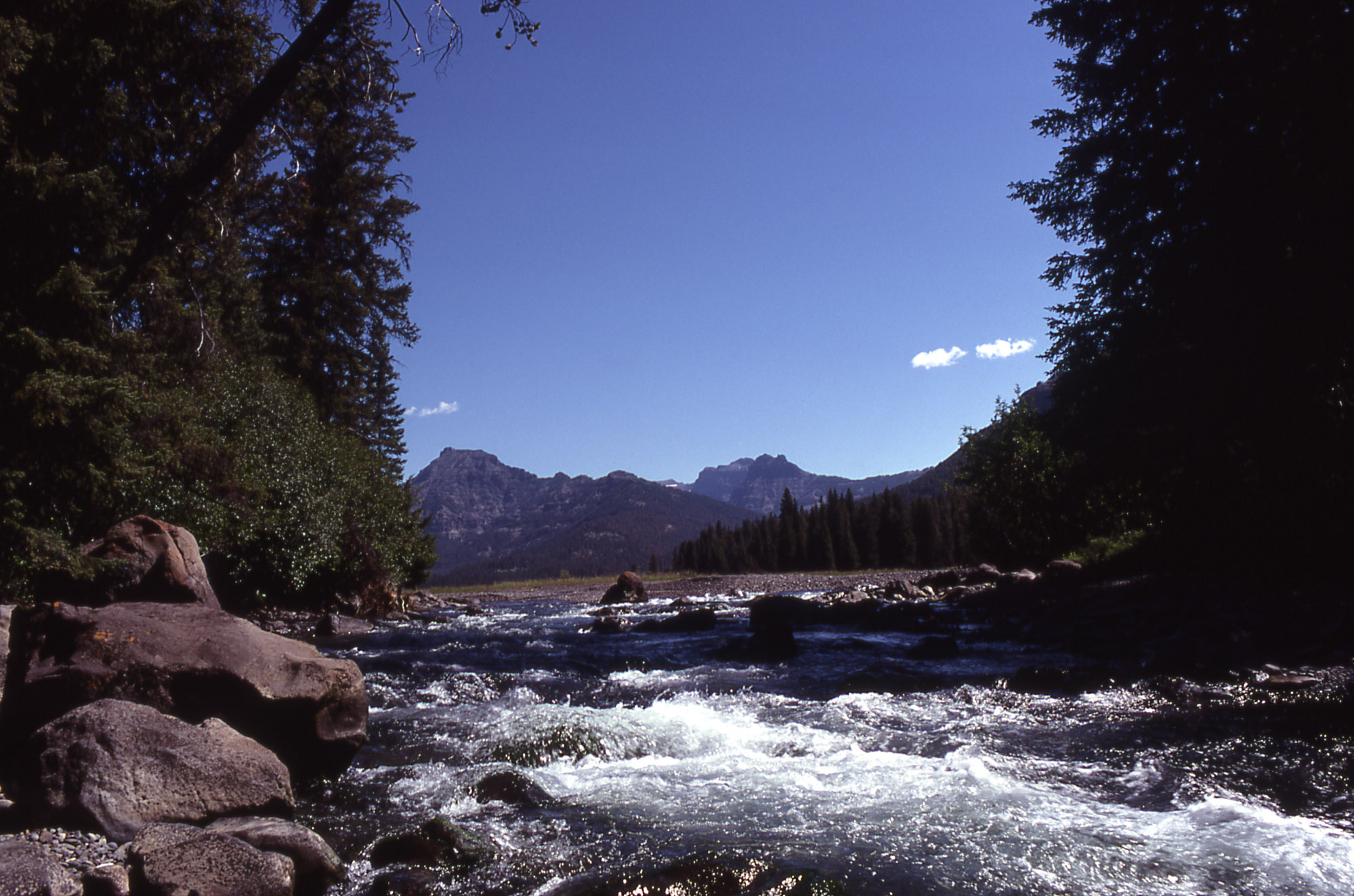
- Soda Butte Creek

Location
- Country: United States
- State: Wyoming

Physical characteristics
- Source
  - location: 45°01′20″N 109°55′03″W, Yellowstone National Park, Montana
- Mouth: Lamar River
  - location: 44°52′12″N 110°11′43″W; Yellowstone National Park, Wyoming
  - elevation: 6,601 ft (2,012 m)
- Discharge
  - location: Lamar Ranger Station
  - average: 143 cu ft/s (4.0 m^{3}/s)

Soda Butte Creek is an approximately 20 miles (32 km) long major tributary of the Lamar River in Yellowstone National Park. It is named for a now-extinct geyser (Soda Butte) near its mouth. Soda Butte and the creek were named by A. Bart Henderson, a Cooke City miner, in 1870. It rises just outside the northeast corner of the park on the southern slopes of the Absaroka Range near Cooke City, Montana. The Northeast East Entrance road parallels Soda Butte Creek for its entire length within the park. Soda Butte Creek is a popular angling destination for native Yellowstone cutthroat trout.

== Angling ==
Soda Butte Creek is a popular angling destination for fly fisherman. It holds brook trout in it upper reaches, mostly cutthroat trout and a few rainbow trout in its lower section. Because of spring runoff, the creek is generally not fishable until mid-July. The National Park Service has made frequent changes to the regulations for the Lamar drainage, including Soda Butte, and in 2018 has made significant new changes. Anglers are now required to kill all non-native fish, including rainbow trout, brook trout, and identifiable rainbow/cutthroat hybrids throughout the Lamar drainage, including all of Soda Butte. On page 14 of the 2018 regulations they still say that if it has a red slash put it back, but that is clearly superseded by the region specific requirement that if a fish landed in the Lamar drainage is clearly identifiable as a hybrid then it must be killed, even if it has a red slash, with the caveat that "if you don't know, let it go." Another significant change to the Park-wide fishing regulations is that felt soles are no longer permitted on waders. Other Park-wide regulations, that continue from previous years, are that barbed hooks, lead weights, lead split shot, and live bait are banned.

== Climate ==
Climate data for Soda Butte Creek, Wyoming
| Month | Jan | Feb | Mar | Apr | May | Jun | Jul | Aug | Sep | Oct | Nov | Dec | Year |
|---|---|---|---|---|---|---|---|---|---|---|---|---|---|
| Record high °F (°C) | 50 (10) | 54 (12) | 61 (16) | 73 (23) | 84 (29) | 90 (32) | 97 (36) | 88 (31) | 86 (30) | 79 (26) | 60 (16) | 46 (8) | 97 (36) |
| Mean maximum °F (°C) | 37 (3) | 43 (6) | 51 (11) | 60 (16) | 72 (22) | 80 (27) | 84 (29) | 83 (28) | 78 (26) | 70 (21) | 51 (11) | 38 (3) | 86 (30) |
| Mean daily maximum °F (°C) | 27 (−3) | 32 (0) | 41 (5) | 50 (10) | 60 (16) | 70 (21) | 78 (26) | 78 (26) | 68 (20) | 54 (12) | 36 (2) | 27 (−3) | 52 (11) |
| Daily mean °F (°C) | 15.0 (−9.4) | 18.0 (−7.8) | 25.3 (−3.7) | 32.2 (0.1) | 40.9 (4.9) | 49.2 (9.6) | 56.3 (13.5) | 54.4 (12.4) | 46.6 (8.1) | 35.5 (1.9) | 22.1 (−5.5) | 14.3 (−9.8) | 34.2 (1.2) |
| Mean daily minimum °F (°C) | −1 (−18) | 2 (−17) | 11 (−12) | 20 (−7) | 28 (−2) | 34 (1) | 37 (3) | 35 (2) | 27 (−3) | 19 (−7) | 9 (−13) | −1 (−18) | 18 (−8) |
| Mean minimum °F (°C) | −32 (−36) | −28 (−33) | −17 (−27) | 1 (−17) | 17 (−8) | 24 (−4) | 29 (−2) | 26 (−3) | 17 (−8) | 4 (−16) | −14 (−26) | −27 (−33) | −37 (−38) |
| Record low °F (°C) | −55 (−48) | −53 (−47) | −40 (−40) | −21 (−29) | 4 (−16) | 17 (−8) | 20 (−7) | 7 (−14) | 2 (−17) | −33 (−36) | −36 (−38) | −55 (−48) | −55 (−48) |
| Average precipitation inches (mm) | 2.42 (61) | 1.93 (49) | 1.96 (50) | 2.06 (52) | 2.67 (68) | 2.92 (74) | 2.14 (54) | 1.79 (45) | 1.93 (49) | 1.66 (42) | 2.18 (55) | 2.33 (59) | 25.99 (658) |
| Average snowfall inches (cm) | 36.8 (93) | 27.0 (69) | 27.7 (70) | 15.1 (38) | 6.9 (18) | 1.0 (2.5) | 0.0 (0.0) | 0.2 (0.51) | 2.1 (5.3) | 10.5 (27) | 25.7 (65) | 32.0 (81) | 185 (469.31) |
Source 1: University of Wyoming
Source 2: WRCC

== Wolves ==
A wolf pack re-introduced in 1995 was called the Soda Butte Pack. It was later renamed to the Yellowstone Delta Pack in 2000 after all the original members of the pack died.

Images of Soda Butte Creek
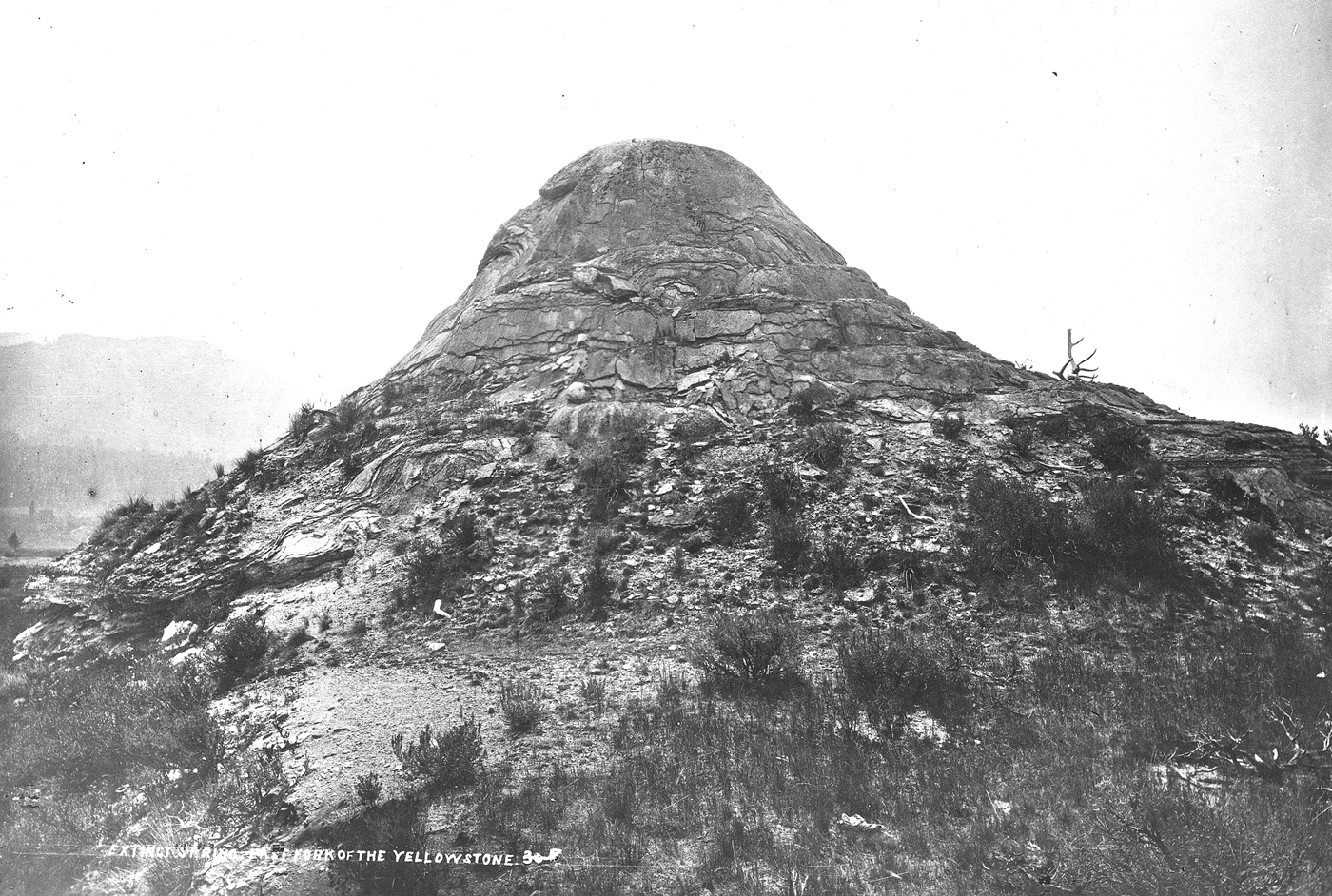
Soda Butte, ca 1872 William Henry Jackson

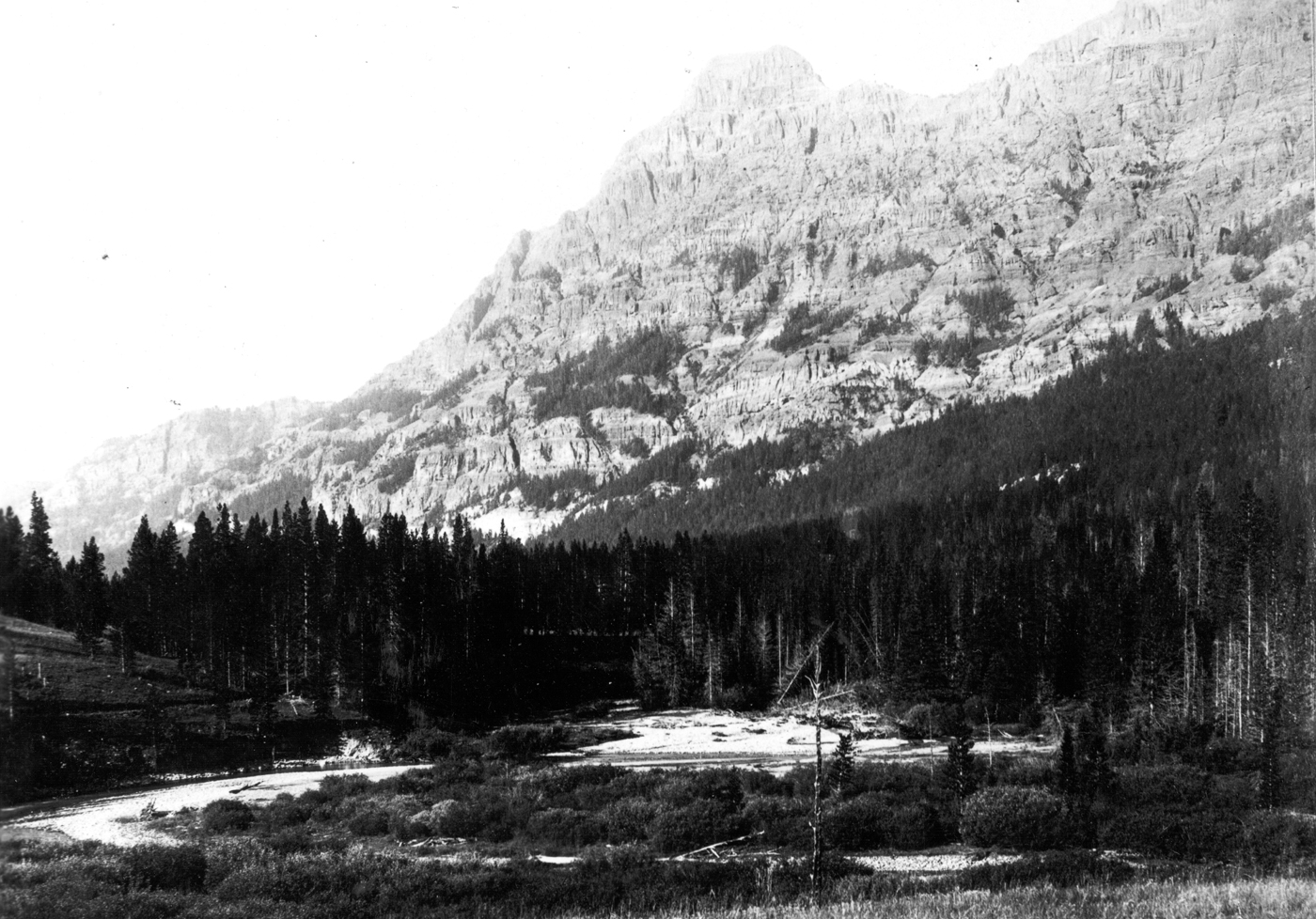
Soda Butte Creek, circa 1890

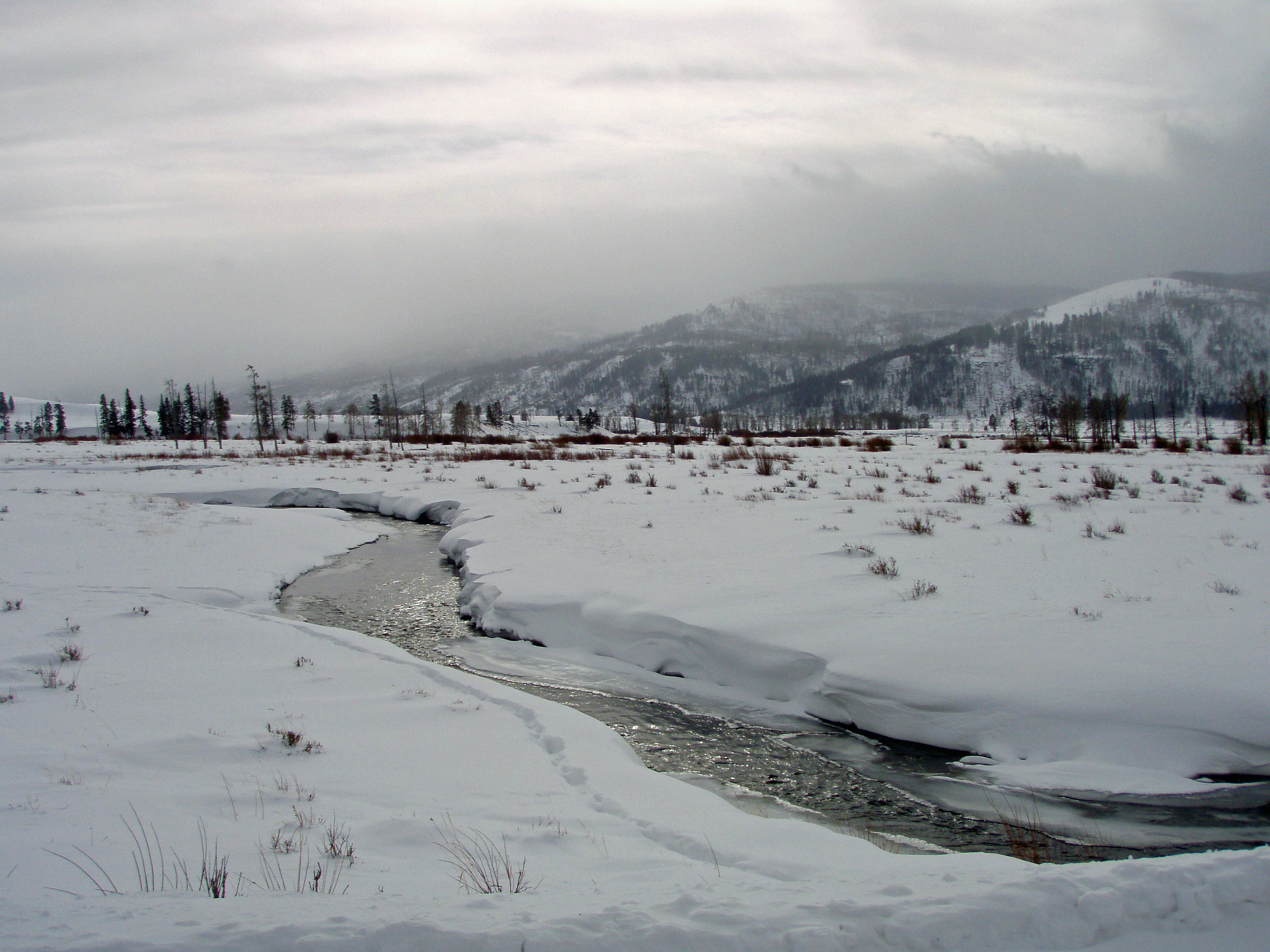
Soda Creek, January 2009

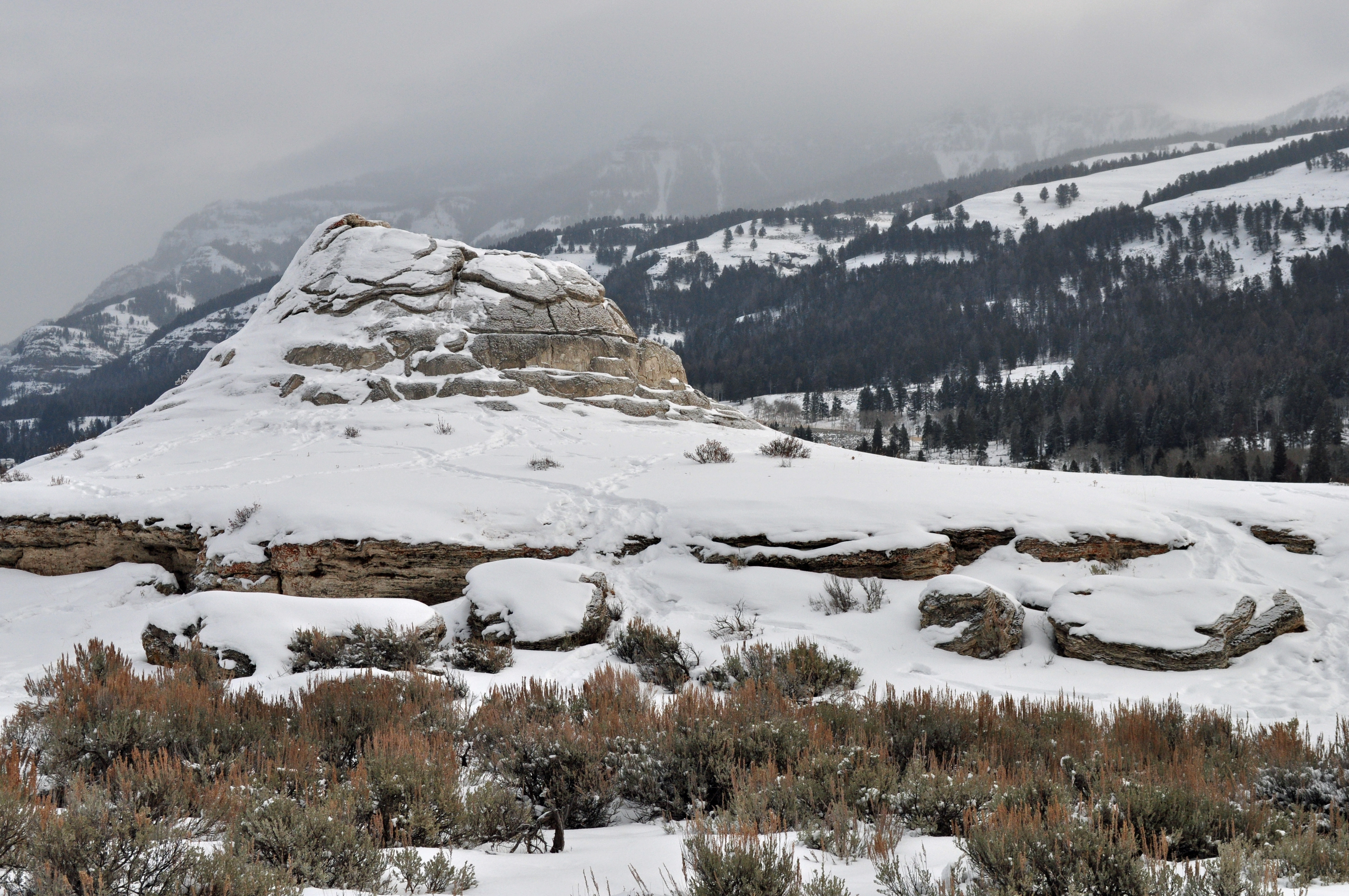
Soda Butte, December 2009

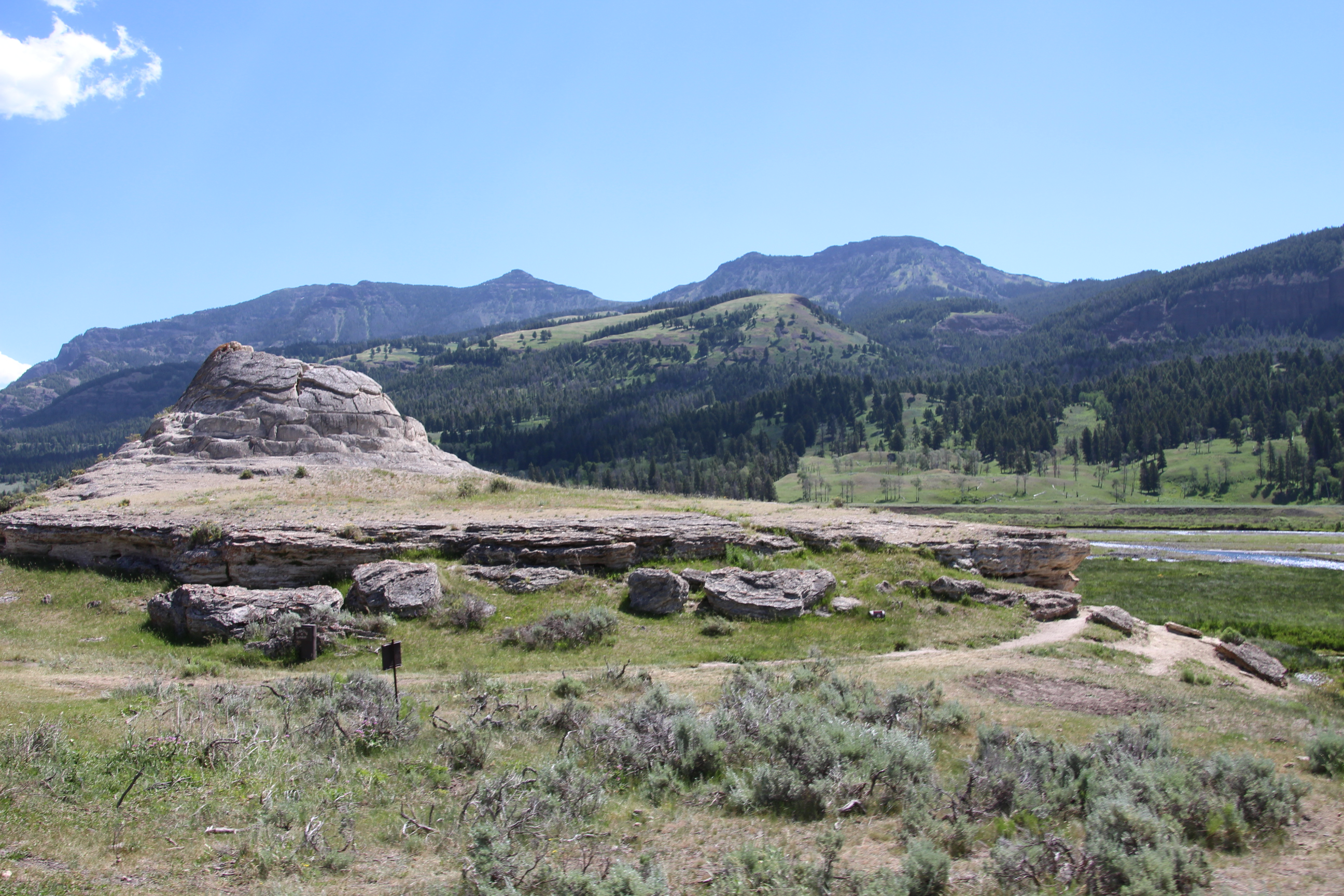
Soda Butte, June 2016

== See also ==
- Angling in Yellowstone National Park
- Fishes of Yellowstone National Park
- History of wolves in Yellowstone
