= Stillwater River (Stillwater County, Montana) =

River in Montana, U.S.A

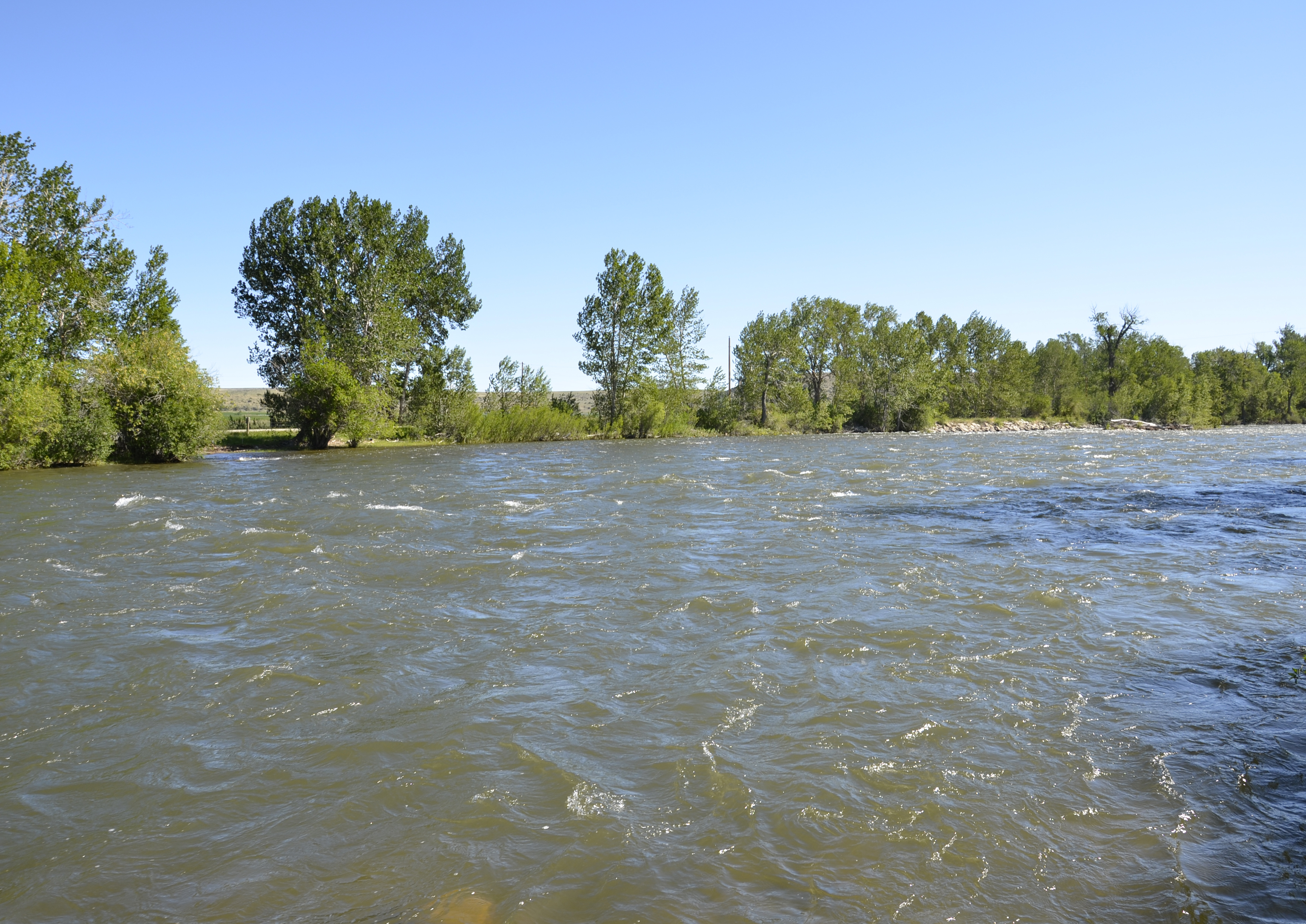

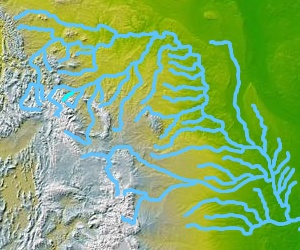
- The Stillwater River

Location
- Country: Park and Stillwater County, Montana

Physical characteristics
- Source
  - coordinates: 45°3′6.78″N 109°59′14.66″W
- Mouth
  - coordinates: 45°38′17″N 109°16′56″W
  - elevation: 3,592 feet (1,095 m)
- Discharge
  - location: near Absarokee
  - average: 908 cu ft/s (25.7 m^{3}/s)

Basin features
- River system: Yellowstone River

The Stillwater River is a tributary of the Yellowstone River. Approximately 70 miles (113 km) long, it runs through southern Montana in the United States. The Stillwater River has also been known as: the Itchkeppearja River, Rose River, Rosebud River and Stillwater Creek.

The river was affected by the 2022 Montana floods.

== General ==
The Stillwater River rises at the north slope of Miller Mountain, south of the Beartooth Mountains in southern Park County, near the state line with Wyoming and the boundary of Yellowstone National Park. It flows northeast, between the Absaroka Range to the west and the Beartooth Mountains to the east, through Custer National Forest, past Nye and Absarokee. It joins the Yellowstone near Columbus, Montana.

== Fishing ==
This Stillwater is a Blue Ribbon fishery. Trout are the primary game fish, but Mountain Whitefish are also common. In the river's lower sections, Rainbow Trout and Brown Trout are the most common, but towards the headwaters Yellowstone Cutthroat Trout and Brook Trout show up with increased frequency. In the spring Rainbow Trout from the Yellowstone River enter the Stillwater to spawn, some traveling as far upstream as Nye. In the fall, Brown Trout also enter the river from the Yellowstone to spawn. It is during these seasons that larger fish up to 5 pounds can be more easily found. The Stillwater is often overlooked, but is one of Montana's greatest fisheries.

Despite its misleading name, the Stillwater's most popular stretches contain class II and III whitewater. While float fishing from a raft is a common way to fish the river, it is recommended that only experienced rowers attempt to navigate it.

Sections of the Stillwater,
Section	Description	Prevalent Species
Headwaters to Nye (River Mile 35)	This stretch is defined by rugged back country, stretches of heavy rapids, and occasional slow moving sloughs, the largest of which is Lake Sioux Charley.	Brook, Cutthroat, Rainbow and Brown Trout.
Nye to Rosebud Creek (River Mile 12)	This stretch of the river offers terrific fly fishing opportunities. It is characterized by clear water, occasional rapids, and much pocket water. The section from Nye to Cliffswallow is not recommended for floating when the river gauge is above 4.5 feet due to several low bridges that span the river, while the section from Cliffswallow FAS to Johnson Bridge FAS offers safer floating.	Rainbows and brown trout dominate in this stretch, but occasionally the other species of trout can be found.
Rosebud River to Yellowstone River (River Mile 0)	The Rosebud adds a good deal of water to the river, but also a non trivial amount of silt, mostly from its tributary stream Butcher Creek. The river contains heavy rapids below Swinging Bridge FAS, the most famous of which is the Beartooth Drop. This stretch is very popular with whitewater rafting companies in summer.	Rainbows and brown trout dominate in this stretch even more so, and the closer to the Yellowstone the larger the fish tend to be.

== See also ==
- List of rivers of Montana
- Montana Stream Access Law
