= Clarks Fork Yellowstone River =

River in Montana and Wyoming, United States

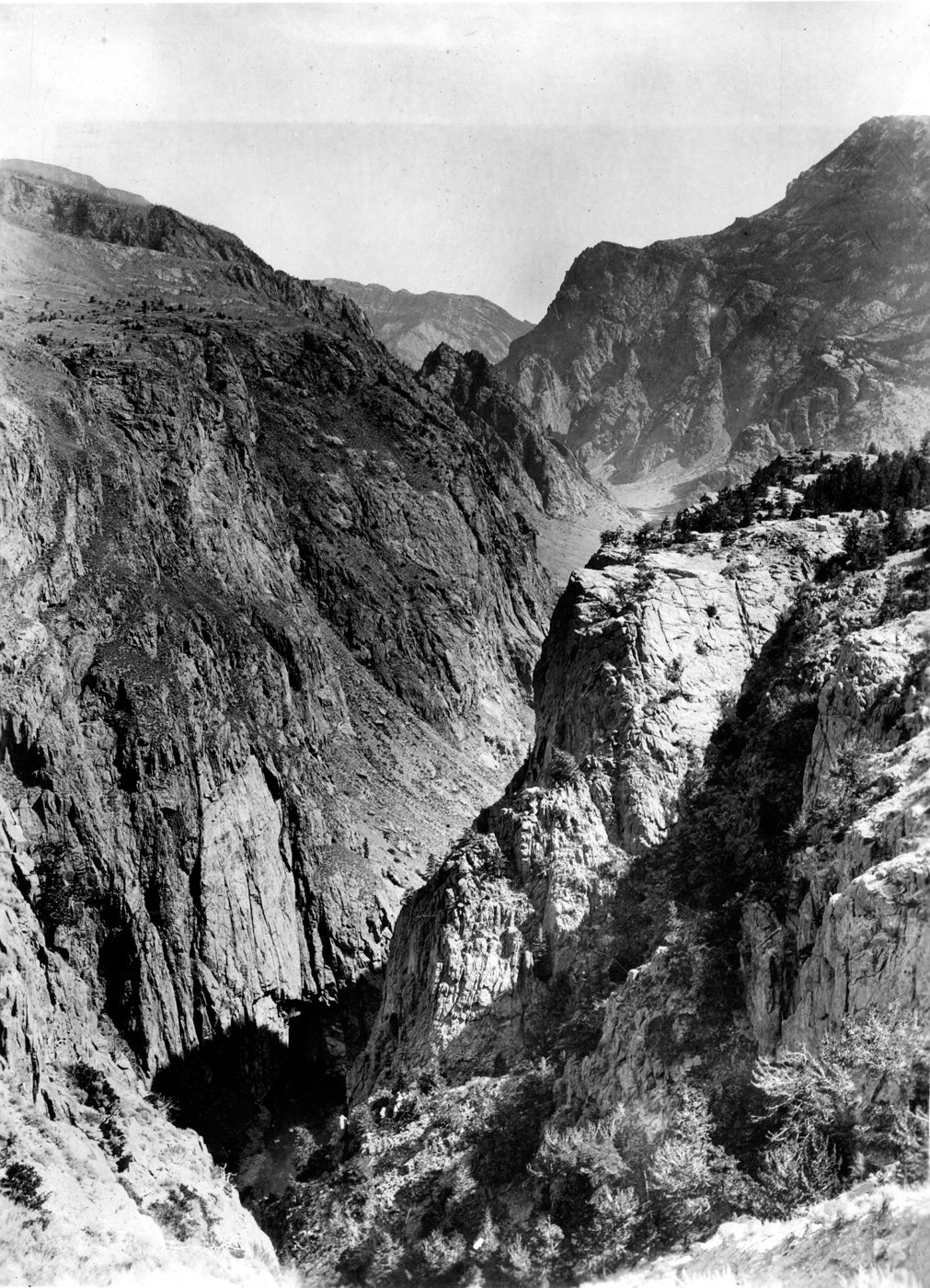
- Clark Fork Canyon, 1893

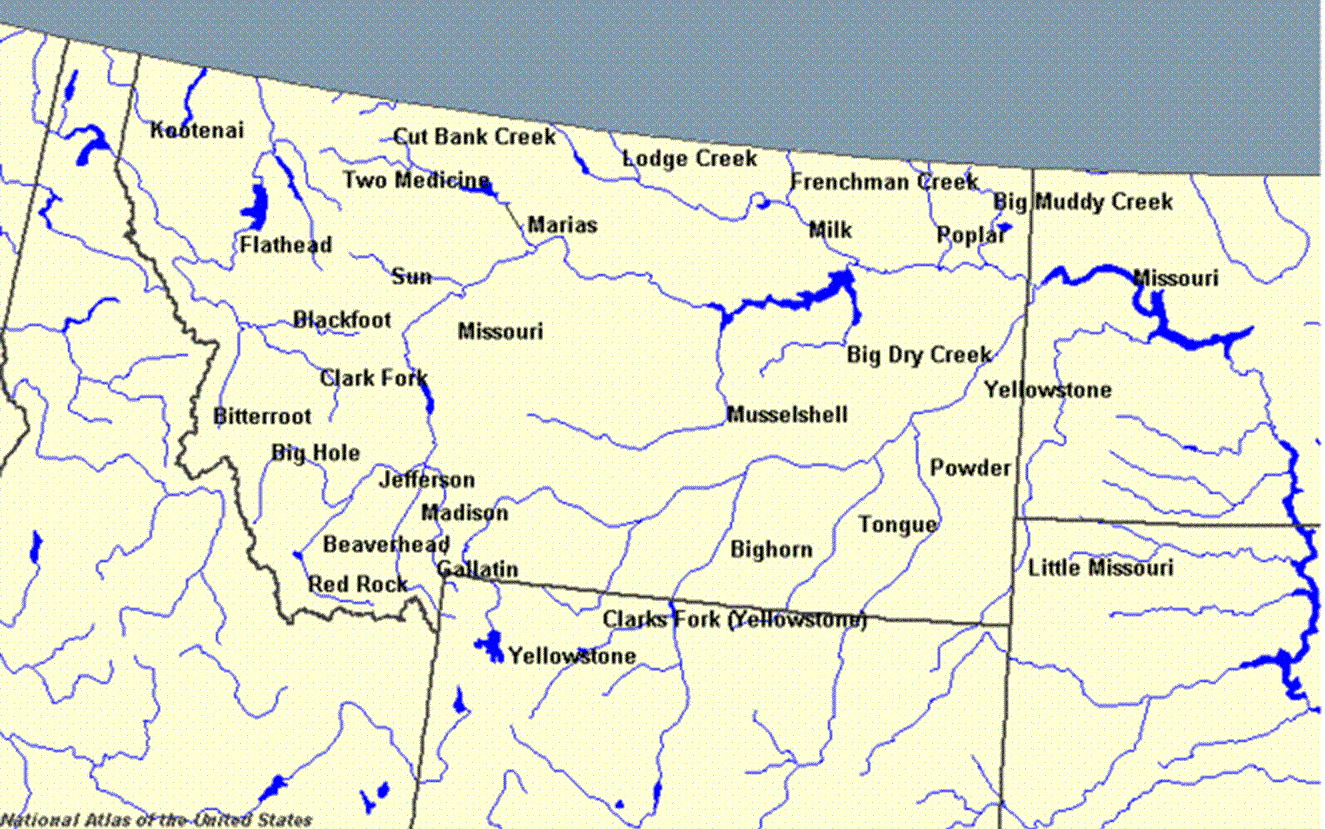

Location
- Country: United States
- State: Montana, Wyoming

Physical characteristics
- Source: Beartooth Mountains
  - location: 45°02′33″N 109°53′42″W
- Mouth: Laurel, Montana
  - coordinates: 45°39′00″N 108°42′55″W
  - elevation: 3,241 ft (988 m)
- Length: 141 mi (227 km)
- Discharge
  - location: near Silesia
  - average: 1,142 cu ft/s (32.3 m^{3}/s)

National Wild and Scenic River
- Type: Wild
- Designated: November 28, 1990

The Clarks Fork of the Yellowstone River (sometimes called the Clark's Fork River) is a tributary of the Yellowstone River, 150 mi (241 km) long in the U.S. states of Montana and Wyoming.

It rises in southern Montana, in the Gallatin National Forest in the Beartooth Mountains, approximately 4 mi (6 km) northeast of Cooke City and southwest of Granite Peak. It flows southeast into the Shoshone National Forest in northwest Wyoming, east of Yellowstone National Park, then northeast back into Montana. It passes Belfry, Bridger, Fromberg, and Edgar, and joins the Yellowstone approximately 2 mi (3 km) southeast of Laurel.

The river was added to the National Wild and Scenic Rivers System in 1990 under Public Law 101-628. 20.5 miles of the river in Park County, Wyoming are designated as Wild, from just below the Wyoming Highway 296 bridge over the river downstream to near the western terminus of Canyon Road.

In the 2022 Montana floods, Rock Creek — a tributary of Clarks Fork Yellowstone River — flooded the city of Red Lodge.

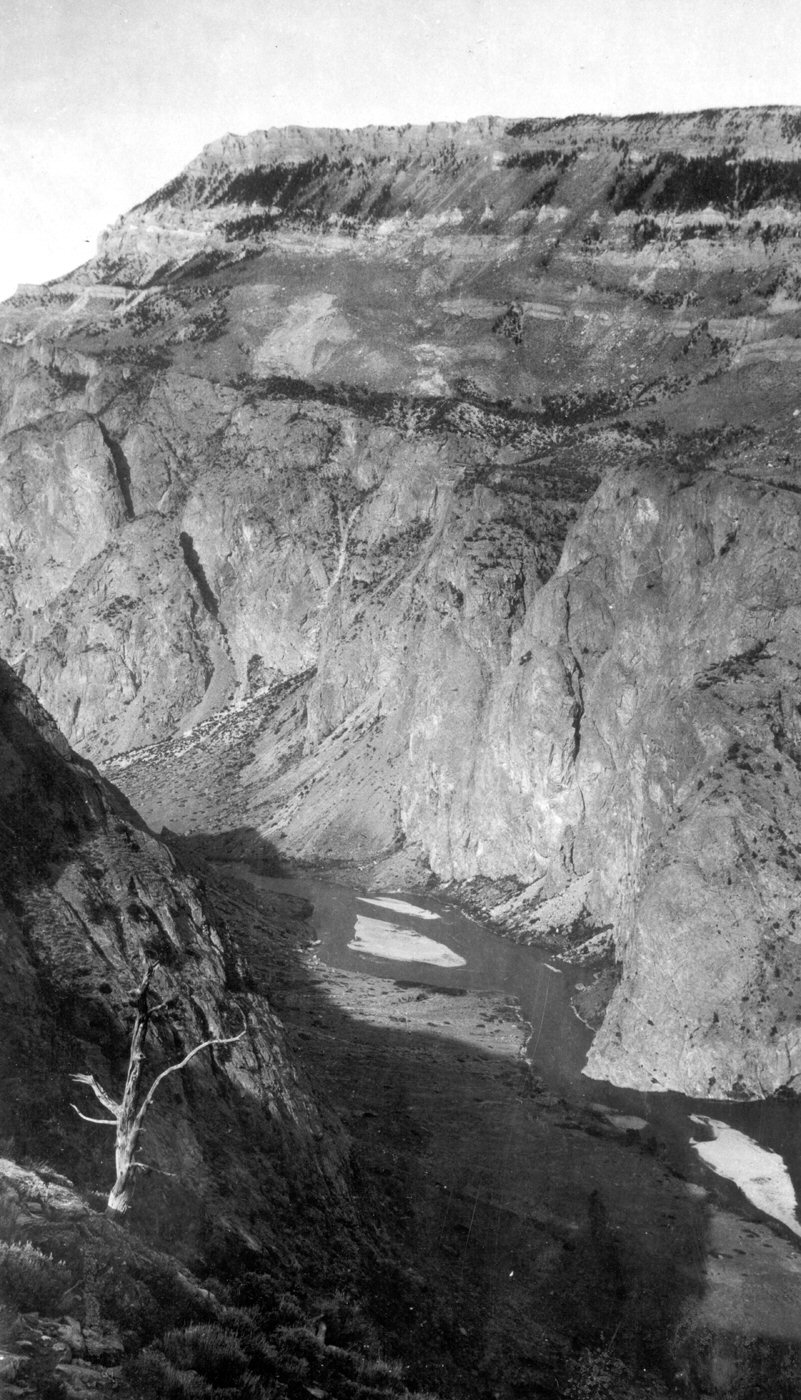
Inner Canyon, 1922

== See also ==
- Montana Stream Access Law
- List of rivers of Montana
- List of Wyoming rivers
