= Brisbane (disambiguation) =

Brisbane is the capital city of Queensland, Australia.

Brisbane may also refer to:

== Places in the United States ==
- Brisbane, California, a city
- Brisbane, North Dakota, a ghost town

== Water craft ==
- HMAS Brisbane (1915) a Town-class light cruiser launched in 1915 and decommissioned in 1935
- HMAS Brisbane (D 41), a Perth-class guided missile destroyer launched in 1966 and decommissioned in 2001
- HMAS Brisbane (DDG 41), a Hobart-class air warfare destroyer commissioned in 2018
- SS Brisbane (1874)
- Lady Brisbane, cruise ship

== Other uses ==
- Brisbane (surname)
- Brisbane (lunar crater)
- Electoral district of Brisbane (disambiguation)
- HMAS Brisbane (naval base), a naval base operated in Brisbane between 1940 and 1942
- Brisbane, a 2010 book by Matthew Condon
- Brisbane, a variant of the Athlon 64 X2 CPU core

== See also ==
- City of Brisbane, local government area
  - Town of Brisbane, former municipality amalgamated into the current City of Brisbane in 1925
- Brisbane central business district, of Brisbane, Queensland
- Brisbane River, Queensland
- Brisbane Ranges National Park, in Victoria
- Brisbane Water, in New South Wales
- Brisbane Water National Park, in New South Wales
- Brisbane County, New South Wales, Australia
- Brisbin (disambiguation)
