= Pine Creek, Montana =

- Census-designated place
- Location within Montana Location within the United States
- Coordinates: 45°30′16″N 110°34′21″W
- Country: United States
- State: Montana
- County: Park

Area
  - Total: 0.81 sq mi (2.09 km^{2})
  - Land: 0.81 sq mi (2.09 km^{2})
  - Water: 0 sq mi (0.00 km^{2})
- Elevation: 4,790 ft (1,460 m)

Population (2020)
  - Total: 80
  - Density: 98.9/sq mi (38.19/km^{2})
- Time zone: UTC-7 (Mountain (MST))
  - Summer (DST): UTC-6 (MDT)
- ZIP Code: 59047 (Livingston)
- Area code: 406
- FIPS code: 30-57550
- GNIS feature ID: 2804312

Pine Creek is an unincorporated community and census-designated place (CDP) in Park County, Montana, United States. It is in the central part of the county, on the east side of the Paradise Valley, where Pine Creek joins the Yellowstone River.

As of the 2020 census, Pine Creek had a population of 80.

Montana Secondary Highway 540 (East River Road) passes the community, leading southwest 11 miles (18 km) to Pray and north the same distance to Livingston, the Park county seat. Pine Creek Road leads west across the Yellowstone River 2.5 miles (4.0 km) to U.S. Route 89, the main highway through the Paradise Valley.

Pine Creek was first listed as a CDP prior to the 2020 census.

== Demographics ==
Historical population
Census	Pop.	Note	%±
2020	80		—
U.S. Decennial Census

== Education ==
The CDP is in the Pine Creek Elementary School District, and the Park High School District. Park High School District is a component of Livingston Public Schools.
