= Emigrant, Montana =

Unincorporated community in Montana, United States

- Unincorporated community
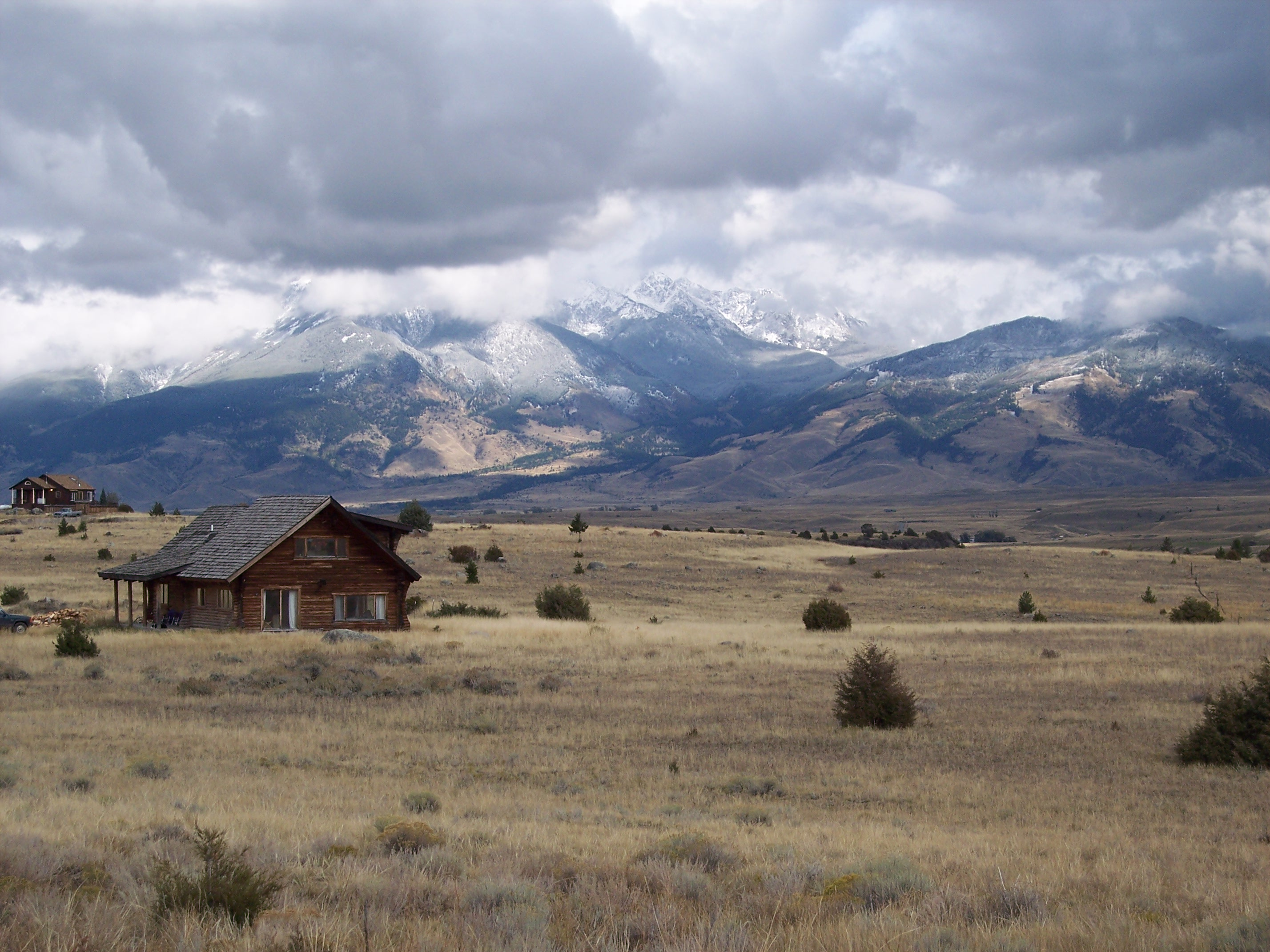
- Countryside near Emigrant

- Location within the state of Montana
- Coordinates: 45°22′32″N 110°45′25″W
- Country: United States
- State: Montana
- County: Park

Area
  - Total: 11.02 sq mi (28.55 km^{2})
  - Land: 10.77 sq mi (27.90 km^{2})
  - Water: 0.25 sq mi (0.65 km^{2})
- Elevation: 5,112 ft (1,558 m)

Population (2020)
  - Total: 465
  - Density: 43.2/sq mi (16.67/km^{2})
- Time zone: UTC-7 (Mountain (MST))
  - Summer (DST): UTC-6 (MDT)
- ZIP code: 59027
- FIPS code: 30-24325
- GNIS feature ID: 2583807

Emigrant is an unincorporated community in Park County, Montana, United States. As of the 2020 census, Emigrant had a population of 465. Emigrant is located in southern Montana, on the Yellowstone River, approximately 30 miles (48 km) north of Yellowstone National Park, and 20 miles (32 km) south of Livingston.

== Geography ==
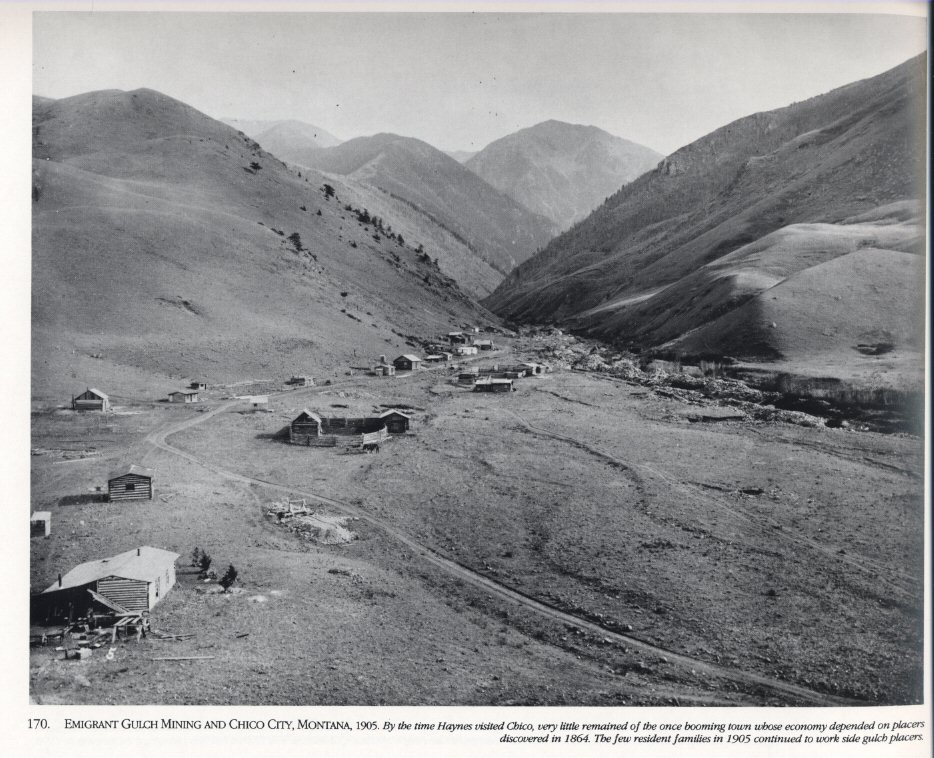
Emigrant Gulch and Chico City in 1905, by Frank Jay Haynes.

Emigrant relies largely on tourism. Most of its facilities and services are open year round.

Emigrant sits between the Absaroka Range and the Gallatin Range in Paradise Valley. The community is located just a few miles west of Emigrant Peak, elevation 10,915 feet (3,327 m). It is situated between Highway 89 and Murphy Lane, making it a crossroads to the Chico Hot Springs Resort, which is situated a few miles southeast.

=== Climate ===
This climatic region is typified by large seasonal temperature differences, with warm to hot (and often humid) summers and cold (sometimes severely cold) winters. According to the Köppen Climate Classification system, Emigrant has a humid continental climate, abbreviated "Dfb" on climate maps.

== History ==
Emigrant is situated very close to the site of defunct Yellowstone City, which was established in 1863 but eventually abandoned and replaced by Chico, sometimes called "Old Chico" or "Chico City," which is situated a few miles south at the mouth of Emigrant Gulch.

The town of Emigrant as it stands today originated as a railroad stop for much of the mining and agricultural activities taking place in the area. It is a much newer community than nearby Chico but has overshadowed Chico due to strategic location. Although the railroad pulled out as transporting freight by truck became standard, Emigrant did not suffer the decline other rural towns in the region had due to its ability to tap into regional tourism. Much of the current structures in Emigrant are newer and well maintained with an "old western" architectural theme.

In August 1864, three emigrants, who came to Montana on the Bozeman Trail, arrived and found men already hard at work mining the creek. The new arrivals decided to try their luck farther up the rugged gulch, finding pay dirt high up the side of Emigrant Peak. The strike caused a stampede that drew several hundred miners and a few women to this remote area deep in Crow Indian country. The miners worked the gravel with moderate success for several weeks before cold weather drove them down to Yellowstone City, near the mouth of Emigrant Gulch.

This settlement was a collection of fifty rough log cabins with dirt roofs and elk hide floors. Supplies ran short during that winter; flour was scarce and tobacco cost $300 a pound, making it worth its weight in gold. The only thing plentiful was venison - for breakfast, lunch, and dinner during the long winter months. In the spring, the shortages ended and the men went back to work on their claims.

By 1866, Yellowstone City had been abandoned, following conflict with local Native American groups and a decline in placer gold production. No remains of the settlement survive. Although the Emigrant Gulch gold strike was relatively modest, it provided worthwhile returns for a number of the area's early prospectors.

Emigrant first had a post office in 1872, which only lasted 4 years but was reestablished in 1911.

== Wildlife ==
Due to its location by the Yellowstone River, Emigrant is a popular area for fly fishing, and also home to many species, such as American badger, black-billed magpie, deer, elk, coyote, fox, and occasionally wolves and black bear.

From Emigrant, it is only a few miles to the Absaroka-Beartooth Wilderness, and the Gallatin National Forest. Emigrant's proximity to the national forests, wilderness area, Yellowstone National Park and the Yellowstone River make it an ideal spot for outdoorsmen to visit and live in.

== Education ==
The CDP is in Arrowhead Elementary School District and Park High School District. Park High School District is a component of Livingston Public Schools.

== Demographics ==
Historical population
Census	Pop.	Note	%±
2020	465		—
U.S. Decennial Census
