= Chico, Montana =

Unincorporated community in Montana, United States

- extinct town
- Nickname: Old Chico
- Location within Montana Location within the United States
- Coordinates: 45°19′16″N 110°42′19″W
- Country: United States
- State: Montana
- County: Park
- Elevation: 5,420 ft (1,650 m)

Population (2010)
  - Total: 15
- Time zone: UTC-7 (Mountain (MST))
  - Summer (DST): UTC-6 (MDT)
- ZIP code: 59027
- Area code: 406
- GNIS feature ID: 781213

Chico is an unincorporated community in Park County, Montana, United States. The population of Chico was 15 as of 2010. Chico currently shares a ZIP code of 59027 with nearby Emigrant. The community is sometimes called "Old Chico", to distinguish it from the nearby Chico Hot Springs Resort.

== History ==
Old Chico or Chico City was established as a town in 1874 but had grown into a permanently populated community much earlier, making it one of Montana's oldest surviving settlements. It is situated in the mouth of Emigrant Gulch. The Chico post office was open from 1874 until 1919.

Gold was discovered in the Chico area in 1863. Mining in the Curry Mining District was begun in the spring of 1894. During this period, miners working in the area lived in a settlement called Yellowstone City. Due to harassment by Crow Indians, Yellowstone City was abandoned by 1865. After Yellowstone City's demise, a new settlement was built at Chico. The Chico townsite was closer to Emigrant Gulch and the mining activity. Chico's population in 1874 was 300. Eventually a school, general store and two boarding houses were built at the site. The town never had a saloon. As the threat from the Crow abated, houses were built further up Emigrant Gulch and closer to the mines. The St. Julian Mine was opened in 1887. Ore from the St. Julian assayed out at $360 in gold and $40 in silver per ton of ore. A ten stamp mill was built in the late 1890s and a 12 stamp mill in 1904. The 1904 mill also had a Blake Crusher and 6 Frue Venners.

Many historic buildings still stand in Chico today, including the old schoolhouse and store, as well as boarding house apartments from the height of its mining days. There are efforts to preserve or restore some of these structures.

The town can be reached both by car or by horseback from the Chico Hot springs resort.
