= Mount Abundance (Montana) =

Mountain in Montana, United States

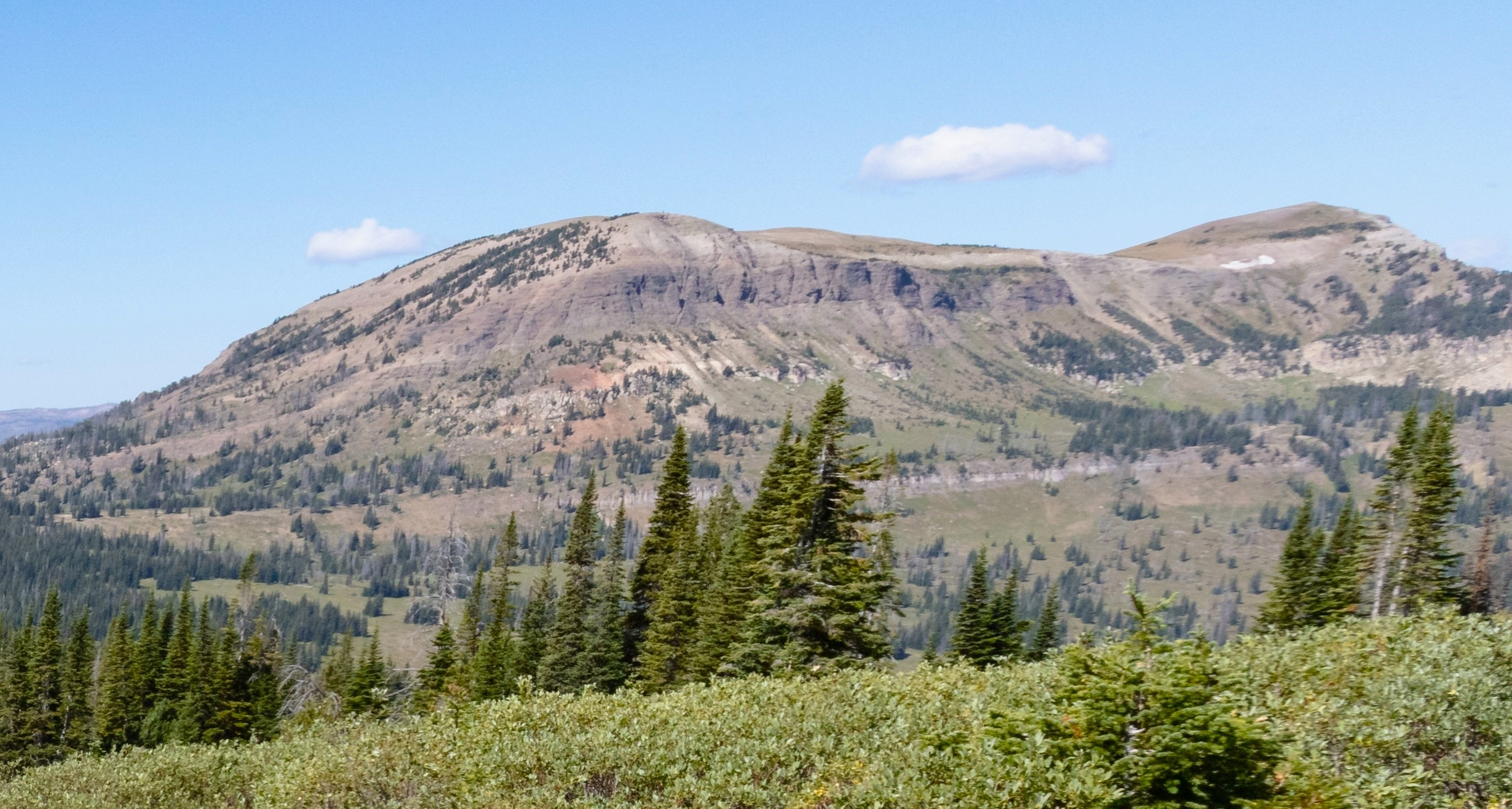
- East aspect

Highest point
- Elevation: 10,116 ft (3,083 m)
- Prominence: 1,056 ft (322 m)
- Parent peak: Wolverine Peak
- Isolation: 1.77 mi (2.85 km)
- Coordinates: 45°04′39″N 110°01′16″W

Geography
- Location within Montana Location within the United States
- Country: United States
- State: Montana
- County: Park
- Protected area: Absaroka–Beartooth Wilderness
- Parent range: Beartooth Mountains; Rocky Mountains
- Topo map: USGS Cutoff Mountain

Geology
- Rock age: Cambrian
- Rock type: Limestone

Mount Abundance is a 10,116-foot (3,083-metre) summit in Park County, Montana, United States.

== Description ==
Mount Abundance is located six miles (9.7 km) northwest of Cooke City, Montana, in the Beartooth Mountains which are a subrange of the Rocky Mountains. It is set on the boundary of the Absaroka–Beartooth Wilderness on land managed by Custer-Gallatin National Forest. Precipitation runoff from the mountain's east slope drains into headwaters of the Stillwater River, whereas the west slope drains into tributaries of the Lamar River. Topographic relief is significant as the summit rises 1,700 feet (518 meters) above Lake Abundance in 0.8 miles (1.3 km). The mountain's toponym has been officially adopted by the United States Board on Geographic Names.

== Climate ==
Based on the Köppen climate classification, Mount Abundance is located in a subarctic climate zone characterized by long, usually very cold winters, and mild summers. Winter temperatures can drop below 0 °F with wind chill factors below −10 °F.

== See also ==
- Geology of the Rocky Mountains

== Gallery ==
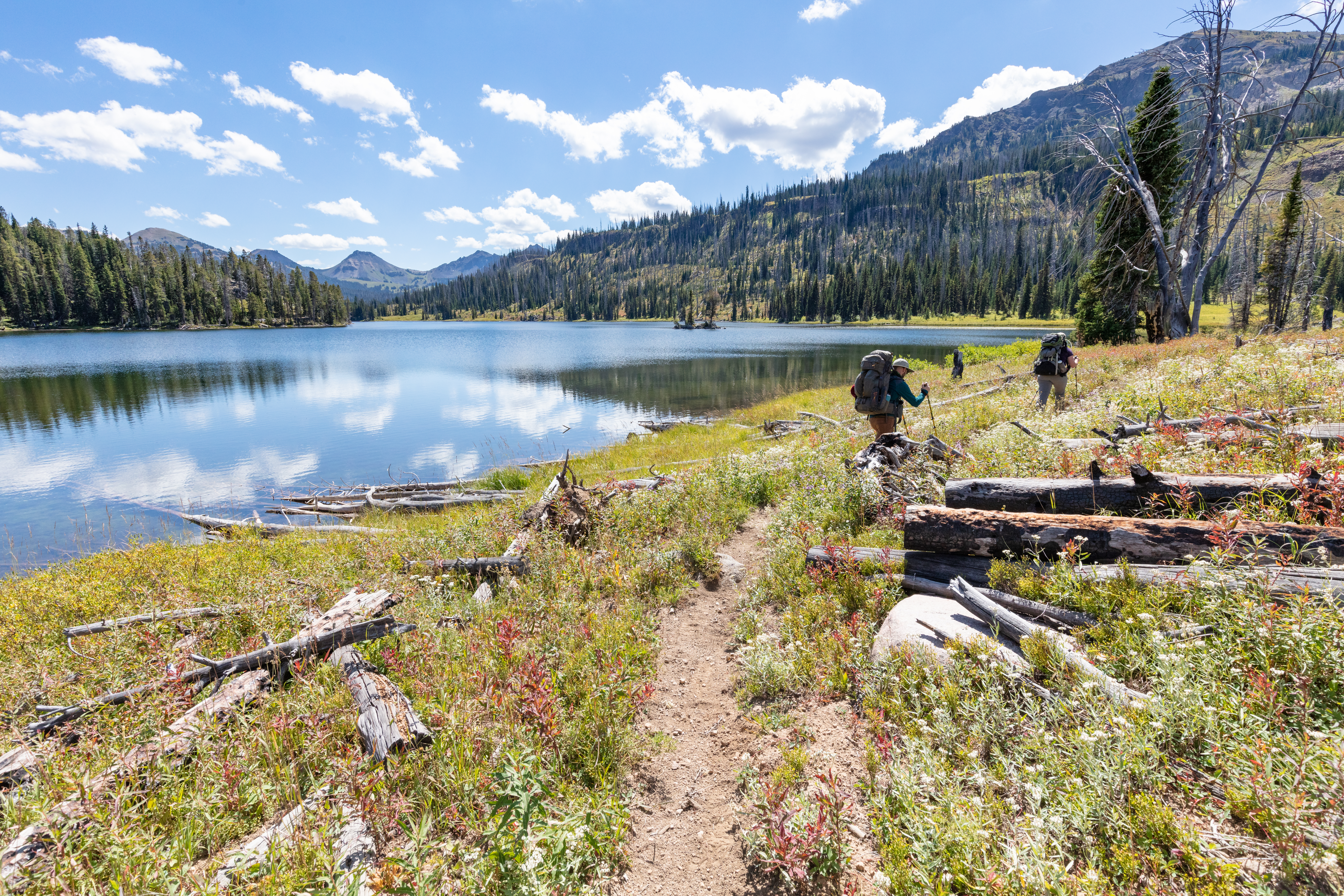
Lake Abundance with Mount Abundance in upper right

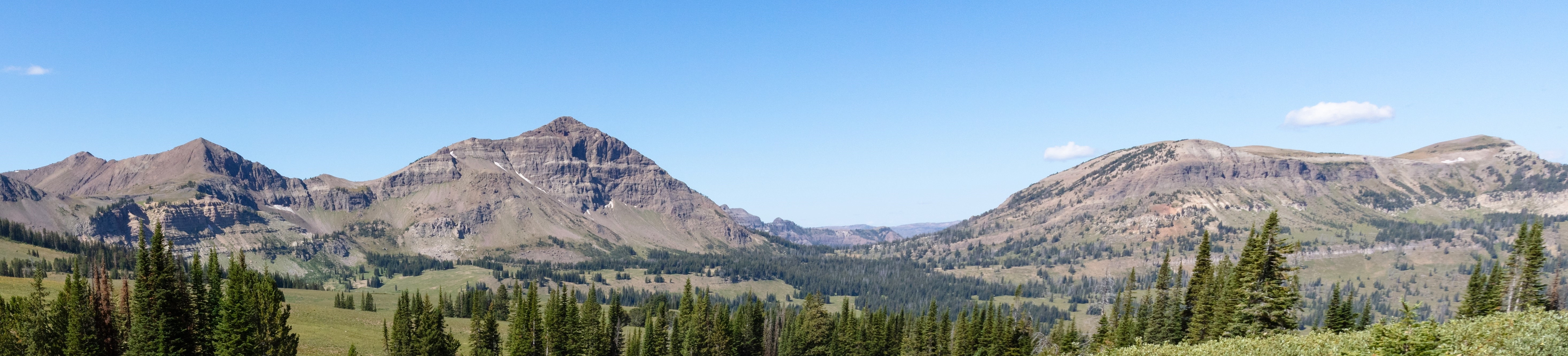
L→R Sunset Peak, Wolverine Peak, Wolverine Pass, Mount Abundance.
