= South Glastonbury, Montana =

- Census-designated place
- Location within Montana
- Coordinates: 45°18′44″N 110°48′27″W
- Country: United States
- State: Montana
- County: Park

Area
  - Total: 17.83 sq mi (46.17 km^{2})
  - Land: 17.49 sq mi (45.30 km^{2})
  - Water: 0.34 sq mi (0.87 km^{2})
- Elevation: 4,915 ft (1,498 m)

Population (2020)
  - Total: 277
  - Density: 15.8/sq mi (6.11/km^{2})
- Time zone: UTC-7 (Mountain (MST))
  - Summer (DST): UTC-6 (MDT)
- Area code: 406
- GNIS feature ID: 2583812

South Glastonbury is a census-designated place in Park County, Montana, United States. Its population was 277 as of the 2020 census.

== Demographics ==
Historical population
Census	Pop.	Note	%±
2020	277		—
U.S. Decennial Census

== Education ==
The CDP is in Arrowhead Elementary School District and Park High School District. Park High School District is a component of Livingston Public Schools.
