= Brisbin =

Brisbin may refer to:

== Places ==
- Brisbin, Saskatchewan, Canada
- Brisbin, Montana, United States
- Brisbin, Pennsylvania, United States

== People ==
- Anna Brisbin, American YouTuber known for her channel Brizzy Voices
- James Sanks Brisbin (1837–1892), American soldier
- John Brisbin (1818–1880), American politician
- John B. Brisbin (1827–1898), American lawyer and politician
- Will Brisbin (born 2005), actor known for role in Paw Patrol: The Movie

== See also ==
- Brisbane (disambiguation)
