= Sunset Peak (Park County, Montana) =

Mountain in Montana, United States

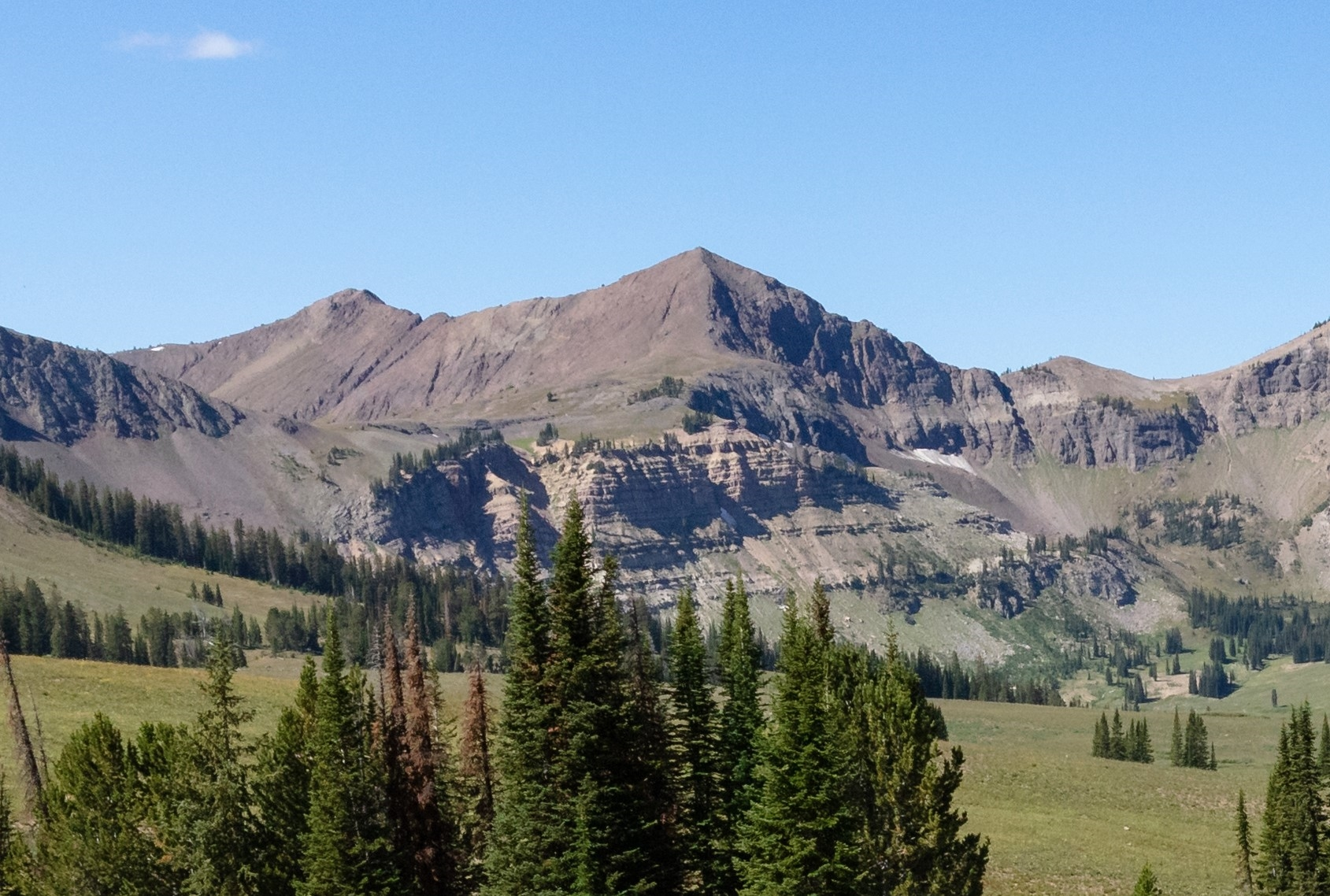
- East aspect

Highest point
- Elevation: 10,201 ft (3,109 m)
- Prominence: 160 ft (49 m)
- Parent peak: Meridian Peak
- Isolation: 0.70 mi (1.13 km)
- Coordinates: 45°02′43″N 110°00′01″W

Geography
- Location within Montana Location within the United States
- Country: United States
- State: Montana
- County: Park
- Protected area: Yellowstone National Park
- Parent range: Absaroka Range; Rocky Mountains
- Topo map: USGS Cutoff Mountain

Geology
- Rock age: Tertiary
- Rock type(s): Volcanic rock, Rhyolite

Sunset Peak is a 10,201-foot (3,109-metre) summit in Park County, Montana, United States.

== Description ==
Sunset Peak is located 3.75 miles (6.04 km) northwest of Cooke City, Montana, in the Absaroka Range which is a subrange of the Rocky Mountains. It is set in the northeast corner of Yellowstone National Park on the common boundary shared by the park and Custer-Gallatin National Forest. Precipitation runoff from the mountain's north slope drains into headwaters of the Stillwater River, whereas the southwest slope drains into Pebble Creek and the southeast slope drains into headwaters of Sheep Creek which are both part of the Lamar River watershed. Topographic relief is significant as the summit rises 1,600 feet (488 meters) above each of the three streams in one mile (1.6 km). The mountain's toponym has been officially adopted by the United States Board on Geographic Names, and has been featured in publications since at least 1901.

== Climate ==
Based on the Köppen climate classification, Sunset Peak is located in a subarctic climate zone characterized by long, usually very cold, snowy winters, and mild summers. Winter temperatures can drop below 0 °F with wind chill factors below −10 °F.

== See also ==
- Geology of the Rocky Mountains
- Mountains and mountain ranges of Yellowstone National Park

== Gallery ==
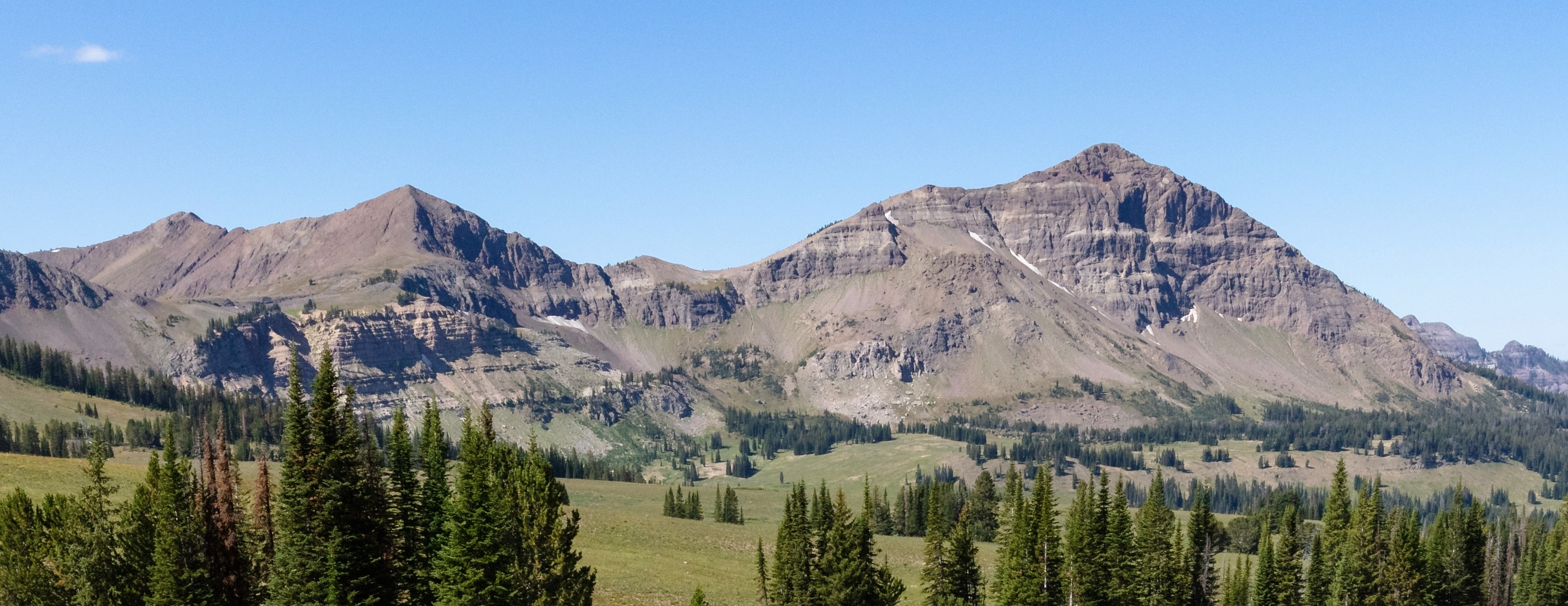
East aspect of Sunset Peak (left) and Wolverine Peak (right)

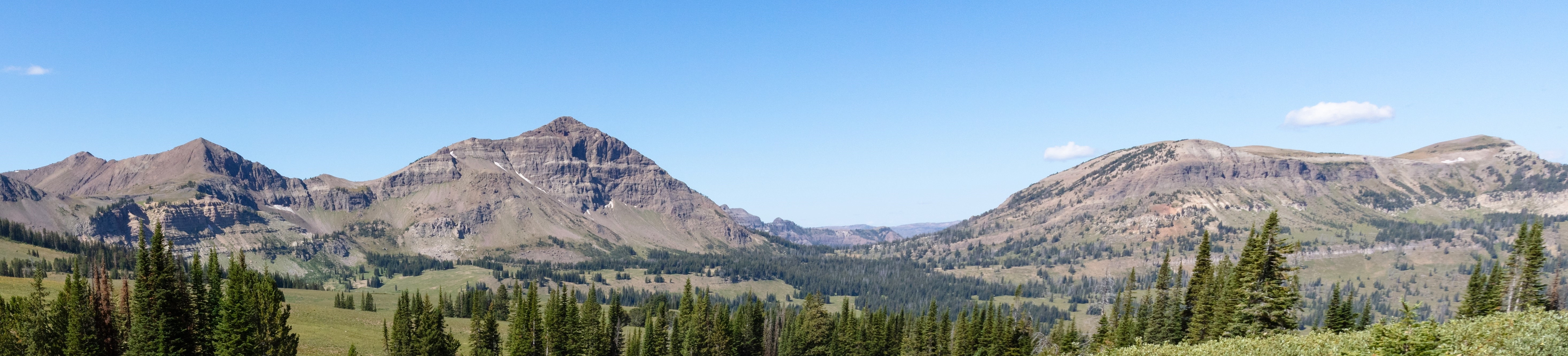
L→R Sunset Peak, Wolverine Peak, Wolverine Pass, Mount Abundance.

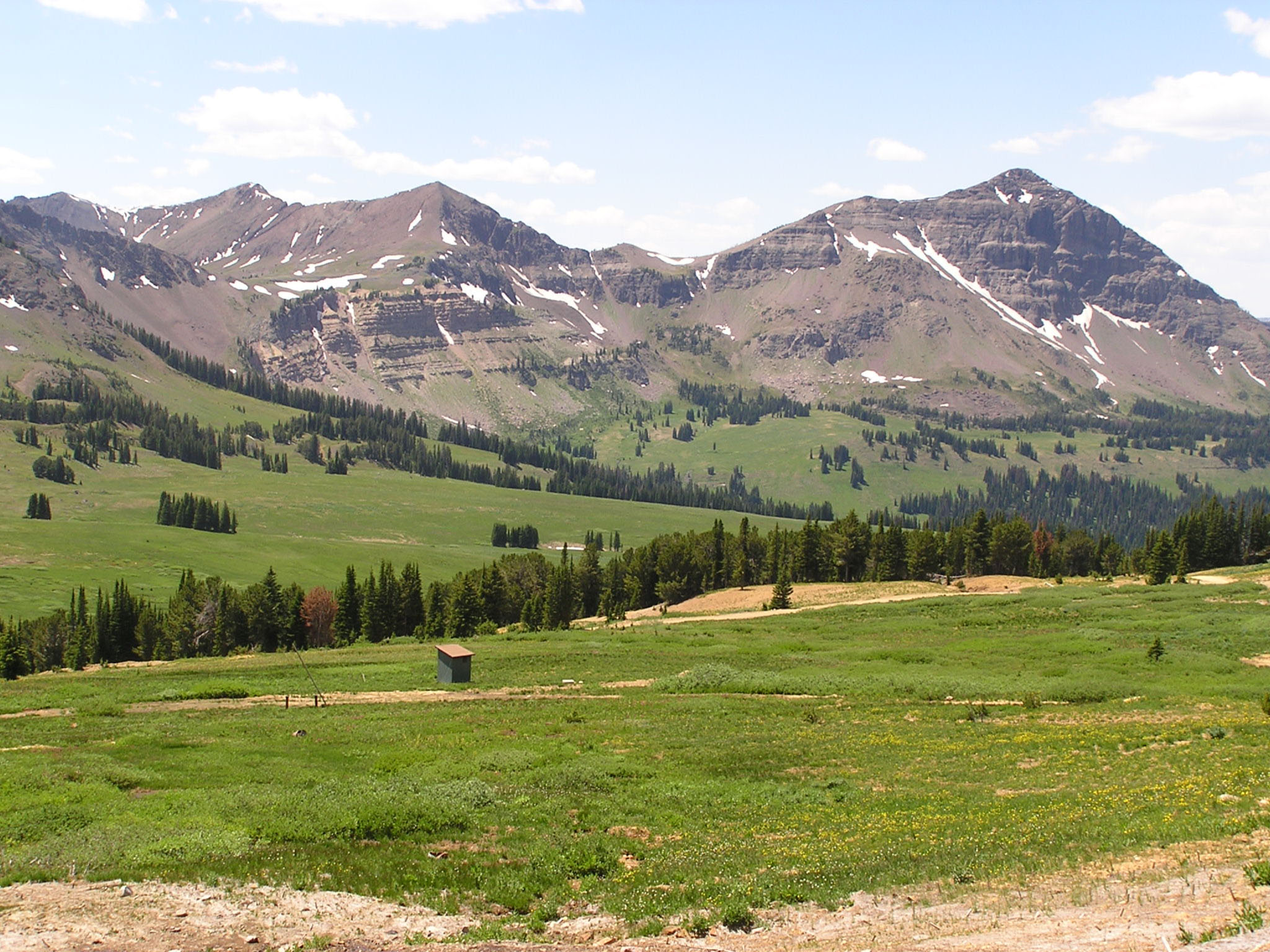
East aspect of Sunset Peak (left) and Wolverine Peak (right)
