= Mammoth Elementary School =

Mammoth Elementary School may refer to:

- Mammoth Elementary School of the Mammoth Unified School District
- Yellowstone National Park School in Mammoth, Wyoming
