= Corwin Springs, Montana =

Unincorporated community in Montana, United States

- unincorporated community census-designated place
- Location within Montana Location within the United States
- Coordinates: 45°07′26″N 110°47′54″W
- Country: United States
- State: Montana
- County: Park

Area
  - Total: 1.49 sq mi (3.85 km^{2})
  - Land: 1.41 sq mi (3.65 km^{2})
  - Water: 0.081 sq mi (0.21 km^{2})
- Elevation: 5,177 ft (1,578 m)

Population (2020)
  - Total: 101
  - Density: 71.8/sq mi (27.71/km^{2})
- Time zone: UTC-7 (Mountain (MST))
  - Summer (DST): UTC-6 (MDT)
- Area code: 406
- GNIS feature ID: 2583801

Corwin Springs is an unincorporated community in Park County, Montana, United States. As of the 2020 census, Corwin Springs had a population of 101. For statistical purposes, the United States Census Bureau has defined Corwin Springs as a census-designated place (CDP).

== Demographics ==
Historical population
Census	Pop.	Note	%±
2010	109		—
2020	101		−7.3%
U.S. Decennial Census

== Education ==
The CDP is in Gardiner Elementary School District and Gardiner High School District Both are components of Gardiner Public Schools.
