= Jardine, Montana =

Unincorporated community in Montana, United States

- Census-Designated Place
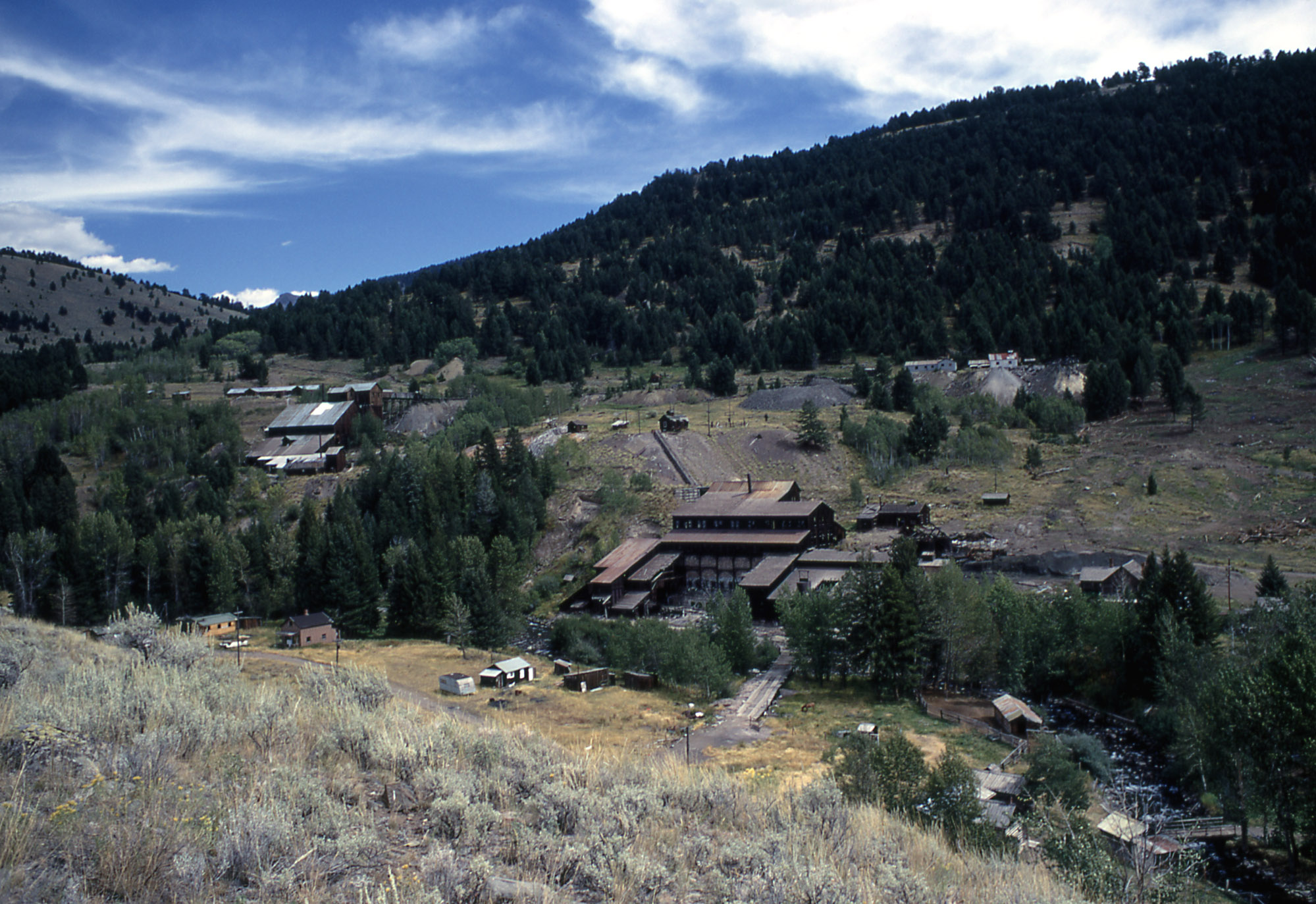
- Jardine in 1969
- Interactive map of Jardine, Montana
- Coordinates: 45°03′23″N 110°37′07″W
- Country: United States
- State: Montana
- County: Park

Area
  - Total: 14.75 sq mi (38.21 km^{2})
  - Land: 14.75 sq mi (38.21 km^{2})
  - Water: 0 sq mi (0.00 km^{2})
- Elevation: 8,232 ft (2,509 m)

Population (2020)
  - Total: 47
  - Density: 3.2/sq mi (1.23/km^{2})
- FIPS code: 30-39175
- GNIS feature ID: 2630598

Jardine is an unincorporated village in Park County, Montana, United States. As of the 2020 census, Jardine had a population of 47. The town lies just to the north of Gardiner on inactive travertine terraces, much like those at Mammoth Hot Springs in nearby Yellowstone National Park. The town's chief industry was a gold mine. The community has the name of A. C. Jardine, a businessperson in the mining industry.

Prospector Joe Brown discovered placer gold near the town site in 1892. Jardine Mining Co. consolidated mining activity in 1917 and, by 1943, had produced 4,403 kg of gold, 347,000 kg of tungsten, and 5,722,000 kg of arsenic.

== Demographics ==
Historical population
| Census | Pop. | Note | %± |
|---|---|---|---|
| 2020 | 47 | | — |
U.S. Decennial Census

== Education ==
The CDP is in Gardiner Elementary School District and Gardiner High School District Both are components of Gardiner Public Schools.
