= Wineglass, Montana =

- Census-designated place
- Location within Montana
- Coordinates: 45°37′40″N 110°37′25″W
- Country: United States
- State: Montana
- County: Park

Area
  - Total: 6.27 sq mi (16.24 km^{2})
  - Land: 6.27 sq mi (16.24 km^{2})
  - Water: 0 sq mi (0.00 km^{2})
- Elevation: 5,095 ft (1,553 m)

Population (2020)
  - Total: 280
  - Density: 44.7/sq mi (17.25/km^{2})
- Time zone: UTC-7 (Mountain (MST))
  - Summer (DST): UTC-6 (MDT)
- Area code: 406
- GNIS feature ID: 2583868

Wineglass is a census-designated place in Park County, Montana, United States. As of the 2020 census, Wineglass had a population of 280.

== Education ==
The CDP is almost entirely in the Livingston Elementary School District. The CDP slightly extends into the Arrowhead Elementary School District. All of the CDP is in the Park High School District. Park High School District is a component of Livingston Public Schools.

== Demographics ==
Historical population
Census	Pop.	Note	%±
2020	280		—
U.S. Decennial Census
