= Mammoth, Wyoming =

- Census-designated place
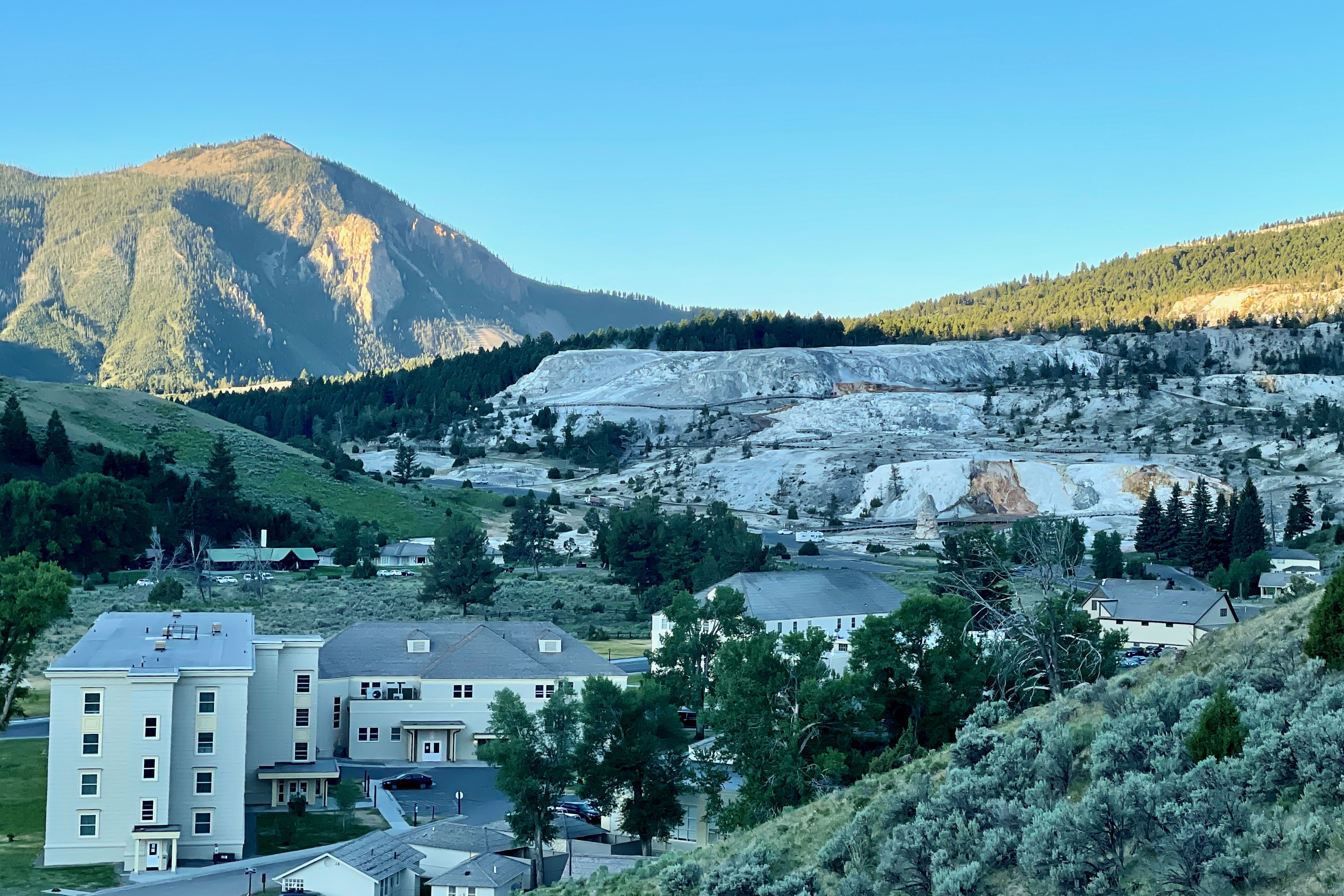
- Mammoth at dawn

- Location within the state of Wyoming
- Coordinates: 44°58′24″N 110°41′35″W
- Country: United States
- State: Wyoming
- County: Park

Area
  - Total: 0.788 sq mi (2.04 km^{2})
  - Land: 0.788 sq mi (2.04 km^{2})
  - Water: 0 sq mi (0 km^{2})
- Elevation: 6,044 ft (1,842 m)

Population (2010)
  - Total: 263
  - Density: 334/sq mi (129/km^{2})
- Time zone: UTC-7 (Mountain (MST))
  - Summer (DST): UTC-6 (MDT)
- ZIP codes: 82190
- GNIS feature ID: 2585082

Mammoth is a census-designated place in Park County, Wyoming, United States, in Yellowstone National Park. As of the 2010 census, its population was 263.

== Education ==
=== K-12 education ===
As of 2014 the Mammoth area, including the Mammoth Hot Springs Historic District, is not in any school district. The 2010 U.S. census states that the CDP is in "School District Not Defined".

=== History of education ===
Students from Mammoth attend Gardiner Public Schools in Gardiner, Montana. The former Yellowstone Park School, also known as the Mammoth School, has a preschool and a community center. Prior to its 2008 closing, Mammoth School had elementary grades, while secondary students generally went to Gardiner.

Education services at Yellowstone began in 1886. Circa the 1880s there were education programs for dependent children, involving a person paid by parents or a soldier providing such services. Some residents chose to send their children to schools in locations towards the east of the country or in Bozeman, Montana. At the time, a lack of transportation options made it difficult to send children to the school in Gardiner. Yellowstone National Park was not put into a school district despite the fact that the Wyoming Constitution asks for areas in the state to be covered by school districts. Steve Browne of the Cody Enterprise wrote that "the park as a federal jurisdiction was overlooked."

In 1921 the Mammoth School opened. Initially secondary school students were sent to Livingston, Montana. The NPS began financing the education of students living on Yellowstone due to the Yellowstone Funding Act, passed in 1948. In 1963 a permanent building for the Mammoth School opened. Prior to 2008, some of the students in Mammoth went to school in Gardiner, but at the time Wyoming did not have an agreement to pay Montana the tuition money. Circa 1963-2003, the time when John Whitman was the principal of the Mammoth School, any area school district could receive a child living on the Yellowstone property, and the Gardiner school system received the largest share of children as it taught secondary school students living in Mammoth.

In 1976, the Payment in Lieu of Taxes (PILT) was supposed to take effect, which meant that the Park Service was supposed to end the education payments. Browne stated "Somehow that information got lost" and payments continued. By 2008 more and more Yellowstone employees only were in Yellowstone during park season, and fewer employees had dependent children. Additionally, the interstate agreement to send Wyoming money to Montana was made circa that year. For those two reasons, in 2008 the Mammoth School closed. The Gardiner school now had an increase in enrollment from the elementary students in Mammoth.

In 2014 the NPS stated that it would stop paying to have students in the Mammoth area. The NPS bureaucracy discovered that it was not supposed to have paid the tuition money since 1976, and wanted Gardiner schools to repay those payments. Matt Mead, the Governor of Wyoming, began using an emergency fund to finance the education of these students. State officials considered having a school district created as a means to extend Wyoming state funding to educate students living in the Mammoth area. Another proposal appeared: it would extend the coverage of Park County School District No. 1, but not as a means of moving the students to Powell, Wyoming - but instead so the district coverage can be used for the state to finance the education of students living in Mammoth. In May 2014 all members of the board of trustees of the school district agreed to the proposal. In June 2014 the Park County Boundary Board approved putting that area in the Park County School District 1. Ultimately the State of Wyoming began permanently financing education of students in Mammoth.

By 2022 there was an increase in families with children. Historian of Yellowstone Alicia Murphy stated that because no school is in Mammoth, not as many families came as there would be otherwise. Some families have one parent in Bozeman, Montana with the children attending school in Bozeman instead of in Gardiner.

=== Libraries ===
A public library staffed by volunteers opened in the 1940s. A National Park Service document stated that the library ended operations around the decade of the 2000s though "It is not known when the Mammoth library group disbanded".

== Climate ==
Climate data for Yellowstone National Park – Mammoth, Wyoming, 1991–2020 normals, extremes 1894–present
Month	Jan	Feb	Mar	Apr	May	Jun	Jul	Aug	Sep	Oct	Nov	Dec	Year
Record high °F (°C)	55 (13)	56 (13)	66 (19)	78 (26)	86 (30)	92 (33)	99 (37)	97 (36)	92 (33)	81 (27)	66 (19)	57 (14)	99 (37)
Mean maximum °F (°C)	44.6 (7.0)	47.8 (8.8)	57.1 (13.9)	68.0 (20.0)	76.9 (24.9)	85.2 (29.6)	91.2 (32.9)	90.5 (32.5)	85.4 (29.7)	73.0 (22.8)	56.8 (13.8)	44.8 (7.1)	92.3 (33.5)
Mean daily maximum °F (°C)	31.4 (−0.3)	34.2 (1.2)	41.9 (5.5)	49.7 (9.8)	59.6 (15.3)	69.5 (20.8)	80.8 (27.1)	79.8 (26.6)	68.8 (20.4)	53.6 (12.0)	39.4 (4.1)	30.3 (−0.9)	53.3 (11.8)
Daily mean °F (°C)	21.7 (−5.7)	23.3 (−4.8)	30.5 (−0.8)	38.0 (3.3)	47.1 (8.4)	55.8 (13.2)	64.6 (18.1)	63.1 (17.3)	53.9 (12.2)	41.3 (5.2)	29.3 (−1.5)	21.1 (−6.1)	40.8 (4.9)
Mean daily minimum °F (°C)	11.9 (−11.2)	12.3 (−10.9)	19.1 (−7.2)	26.3 (−3.2)	34.6 (1.4)	42.0 (5.6)	48.3 (9.1)	46.5 (8.1)	39.0 (3.9)	28.9 (−1.7)	19.2 (−7.1)	11.9 (−11.2)	28.3 (−2.1)
Mean minimum °F (°C)	−9.5 (−23.1)	−8.7 (−22.6)	0.8 (−17.3)	12.1 (−11.1)	22.6 (−5.2)	32.2 (0.1)	40.0 (4.4)	36.9 (2.7)	27.7 (−2.4)	12.6 (−10.8)	−0.2 (−17.9)	−9.1 (−22.8)	−18.0 (−27.8)
Record low °F (°C)	−36 (−38)	−35 (−37)	−24 (−31)	−6 (−21)	6 (−14)	20 (−7)	21 (−6)	24 (−4)	0 (−18)	−8 (−22)	−27 (−33)	−35 (−37)	−36 (−38)
Average precipitation inches (mm)	0.91 (23)	0.79 (20)	1.09 (28)	1.40 (36)	1.82 (46)	1.86 (47)	1.27 (32)	1.05 (27)	1.21 (31)	1.34 (34)	1.15 (29)	0.91 (23)	14.80 (376)
Average snowfall inches (cm)	11.5 (29)	11.5 (29)	10.9 (28)	7.8 (20)	1.7 (4.3)	0.3 (0.76)	0.0 (0.0)	0.0 (0.0)	0.6 (1.5)	4.7 (12)	9.9 (25)	12.6 (32)	71.5 (182)
Average precipitation days (≥ 0.01 in)	10.6	11.4	10.5	11.3	12.8	12.5	9.2	8.5	8.7	9.7	9.6	11.9	126.7
Average snowy days (≥ 0.1 in)	8.7	9.4	7.0	5.5	1.2	0.1	0.0	0.0	0.3	2.8	7.5	10.2	52.7
Source: NOAA

== See also ==
- Mammoth Hot Springs Historic District
