= Federal involvement in United States education =

Education, once solely a state and local issue, now sees significant amounts of oversight and funding on the elementary and secondary levels from the federal government. This trend started slowly in the Civil War era, but increased precipitously during and following World War II, and has continued to the present day.

== Initial federal action ==
The first piece of federal education legislation passed by Congress was the Morrill Land-Grant Colleges Act. This bill was passed as a means for the Federal government to provide land proportional to the number of Congressmen and Senators a state had for states to use to create agricultural colleges. The next noteworthy piece of legislation passed by Congress pertaining to education was the Smith-Hughes Act which provided federal aid to vocational education programs across the country. Through the beginning of the 20th century, the federal government had a relatively small role to play in education, and its contributions focused mainly on providing opportunities to students who would later become an important part of a well-functioning economy. This tact changed following the Great Depression and World War II though.

== Post-World War II era ==
The federal government’s foray into public education had two main motivations, National defense and social responsibility. While they do not entirely overlap chronologically, they together served as a way for the federal government to become involved.

=== National defense ===
After the end of World War II, US soldiers fighting abroad came home and, in an attempt to offset the influx of servicemen returning to the workforce, Congress passed the Servicemen’s Readjustment Act. Congress did not pass another piece of war-related education legislation until the National Defense Education Act. A direct response to the Soviet launch of sputnik, the act provided federal funding towards math, science and language programs to help American students catch up to the Soviets. By turning education into a matter of national defense, the federal government gave itself a valid reason for having a say in education policy, as there is no mention of education in the U.S. Constitution, and therefore it is a power reserved to the people or the states.

=== Social responsibility ===
During and immediately after the war, the federal government contributed money to districts unduly burdened by military instillations. During this time, some began to believe that schools could no longer adequately provide for themselves. The Brown v. Board ruling aided this viewpoint in that the federal government had to get involved in making sure that all individuals were protected. This, along with the “urban crisis” happening in the US, led the federal government to pass one of its most long lasting and impactful pieces of education legislation, the Elementary and Secondary Education Act. A general subsidy for education with a series of provisions states must follow, the ESEA thrust the Federal government into the education policy picture.

== See also ==
- Bureau of Indian Education (BIE) - Federal school system for Native American students
- Department of Defense Education Activity (DoDEA) - Federal school system for dependents of employees of the military
- Yellowstone Park School - A school on Yellowstone National Park that existed from 1921 to 2008; it was federally funded from 1949 to 2008.
