= Chico Hot Springs =

Thermal spring and resort

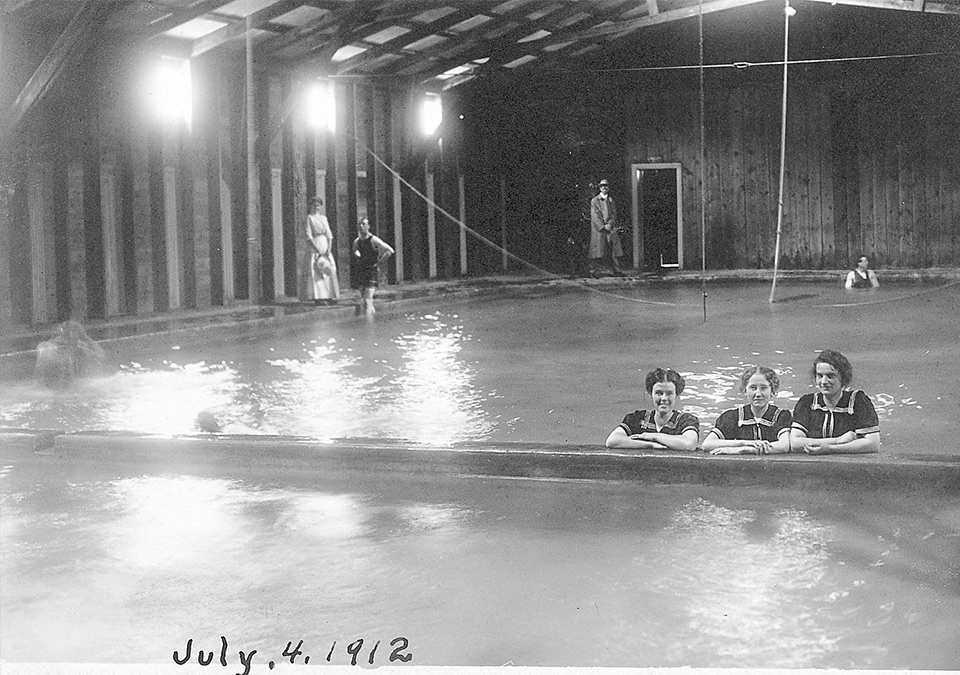
- Chico Hot Springs in 1912
- Interactive map of Chico Hot Springs
- Elevation: 5,272 ft (1,607 m)
- Type: geothermal spring
- Discharge: 37 gallons per minute
- Temperature: 113 °F (45 °C)

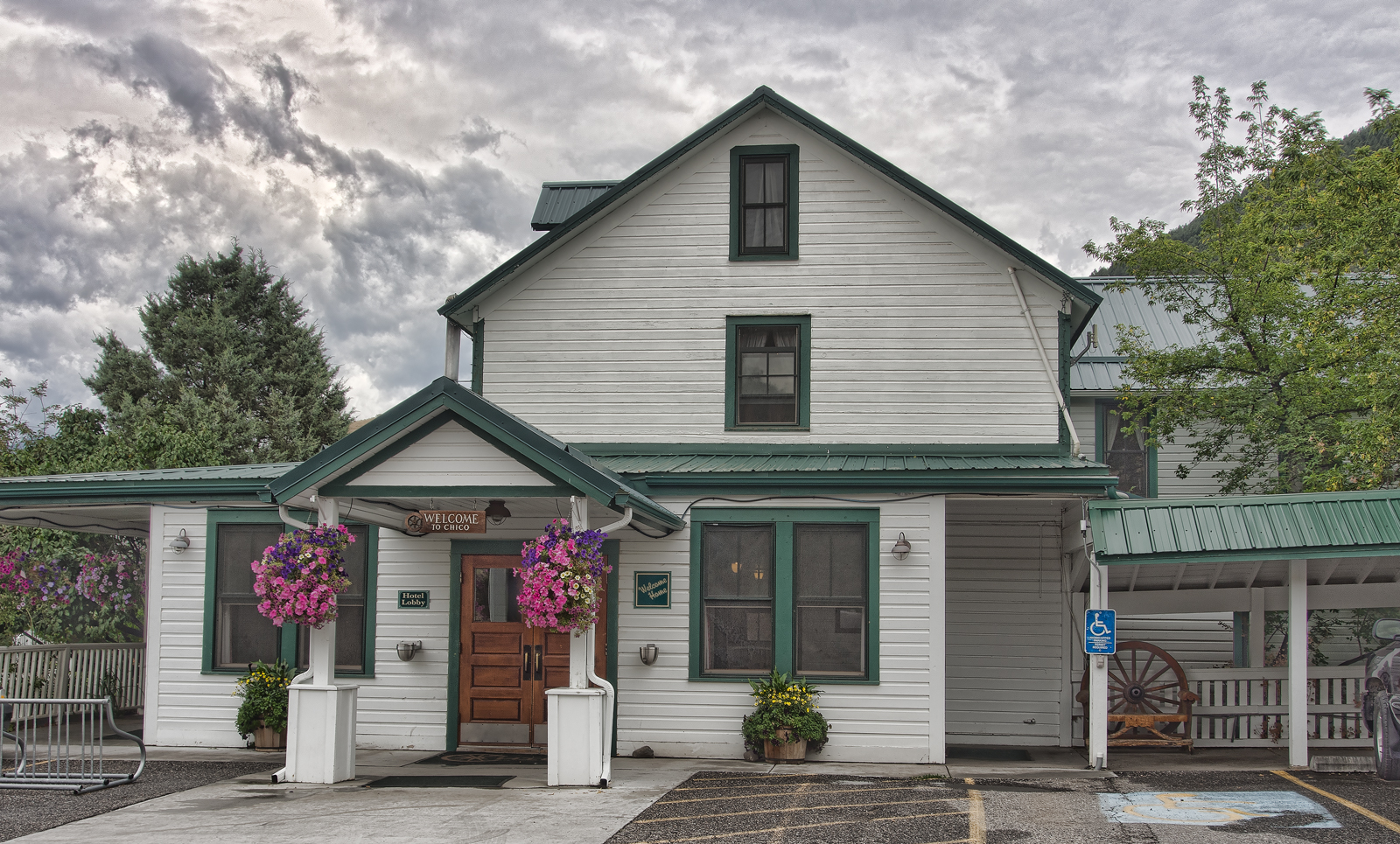
Chico Hot Springs is listed by the National Register of Historic Places

Chico Hot Springs are located near Pray, Montana. It is approximately 30 miles north of Yellowstone National Park. Beginning in 1900, the natural hot springs has been gradually turned into a vacation resort.

== Location ==
Chico Hot Springs is located at 45°20′16″N 110°41′32″W, el. 5,272 feet (1,607 m) and resides in Park County, Montana, in Paradise Valley.

== Hot springs ==
The hot springs are associated with a deep fracture zone, it is not clear if they related to the nearby Yellowstone Hot Spot. The hot mineral water emerges from the ground at 113°F (45°C), at 37 gallons per minute. Currently, there are a couple of developed pools that collect the water from the springs for the use of paying resort guests. These private pools range in temperature from 104 degrees Fahrenheit to 96 degrees Fahrenheit depending on the geothermal activity.

== History ==
Native Americans were the first people to use the Hot Springs; they primarily used it for bathing and laundry. On January 16, 1865, John S. Hackney, a miner, wrote, "I went out to the hot springs and washed my dirty 'duds." This was the first recorded writing about the Hot Springs. By the year 1876, the hot water was used for different purposes. Mr. Randall, also a miner, erected some hot houses for a garden he had planted. The hot water that flowed underneath his crops provided a prime growing environment.

In 1900, Bill and Percie Knowles, built Chico Warm Springs Hotel. The inn consisted of a 'plunge' pool and a full service dining area. Mr. Knowles operated the hotel until his death on April 22, 1910. This left the widow Percie Knowles in charge of the hotel operations. Under her guidance, the hotel continued to flourish. She hired a physician named Dr. George A. Townsend in June 1912 who promoted the healing properties of the thermal spring water that allegedly cured internal ailments such as kidney disease, as well as relieved rheumatism, and external ailments such as skin problems. The doctor's fame spread at such a rate that the resort needed additional boarding. By 1916, a hospital wing of 20 rooms was added on to the hotel. On July 1, 1925, Dr. Townsend left his services at the Hot Springs behind, leaving Mrs. Knowles to run the hotel on her own. By the early 1930s, the hospital wing had been torn down due to decreasing business at the hotel. These challenging times took their toll on Mrs. Knowles' health, and she left the operations in the late 1930s. She was diagnosed with mental illness and sent to a state hospital where she died. Her son Radbourne and his wife Agnes Sophia took over the business. They sold the business in 1948. In the years following, the property became a guest ranch, road house, church camp, as well as other uses.

== Current times ==
As of 2026, Many of Chico's original buildings are remarkably well-intact, including the 1900 inn and it's early additions. Owners Mike and Eve Art bought the property in 1973 and worked tirelessly to grow and improve the business. They won acclaim as innkeepers and are credited with turning Chico into a successful, year-round resort. Some of the newer buildings consist of modern looking cabins and suites. During the years the Arts owned the property there were several famous guests including Steve McQueen, Ali MacGraw, Dennis Quaid, Jeff Bridges and George McGovern. The organic garden produces fresh herbs and vegetables year round from "the geothermally heated greenhouse, built in 1996." In 2015, the Arts sold Chico to the manager Colin Davis.

In June 2014 officials from the Department of Environmental Quality detected a groundwater seep from a hillside near the resort. To mitigate the possibility of pathogens from the surface water seep entering the aquifer water, they issued a boil water order. A filtration system was installed for drinking water, and the seep did not seem to affect the hot springs water quality.
