= Wolverine Peak =

Mountain in Montana, United States

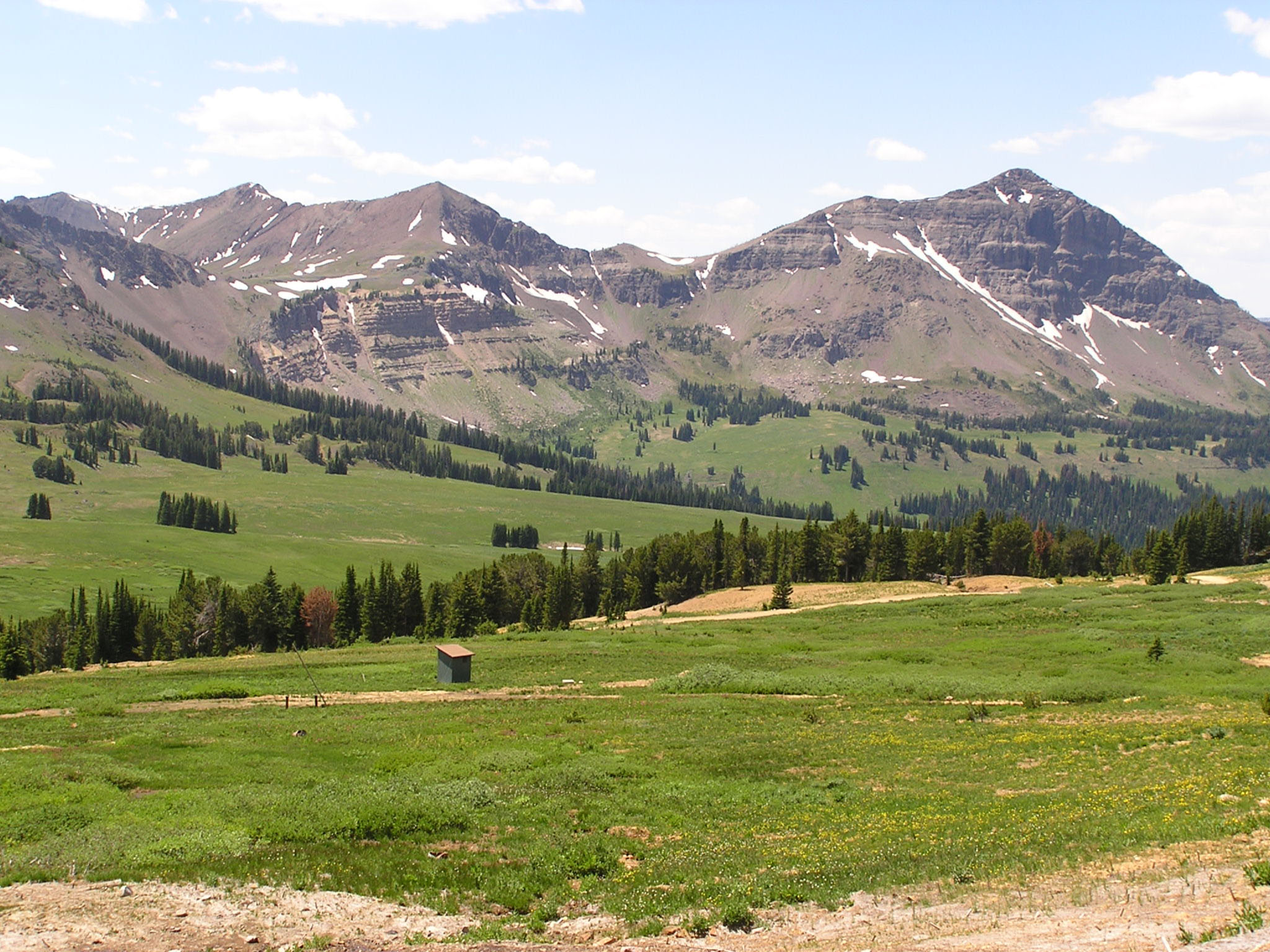
- Wolverine Peak (right), northeast aspect (Sunset Peak to left)

Highest point
- Elevation: 10,479 ft (3,194 m)
- Coordinates: 45°03′12″N 110°00′34″W

Geography
- Location within Montana
- Location: Montana, U.S.
- Parent range: Absaroka Range
- Topo map: USGS Cutoff Mountain

Wolverine Peak is a mountain in the Absaroka Range in the state of Montana, United States. It has a height of 10,479 feet (3,194 m) and is located in the Park County. The summit of Wolverine Peak is located at the triple border point between the Absaroka-Beartooth Wilderness, Custer National Forest and Yellowstone National Park.
