= Yellowstone National Park School =

School in Wyoming, United States

Yellowstone National Park School, also known as Yellowstone Park School, Yellowstone Park Elementary School and Mammoth School, was an elementary school in Mammoth, Wyoming, on the property of Yellowstone National Park. It had grades Kindergarten through 6.

Established in 1921, it was originally a private school, but in 1949 it became a federally-funded school, with National Park Service providing the money. In 1995 it was one of three American schools on national park property, and of them it was the only completely federally-funded school; the other schools on national park property were and are operated by local school districts with funding from the respective states. John Whitman, who had been principal of Yellowstone National Park School, stated that the reason why a school independent of state funding developed on Yellowstone was because the park had been established before the statehoods of Wyoming and Montana. The school closed in 2008, with students from Mammoth moved to Gardiner Public Schools in Gardiner, Montana, where secondary students from Mammoth had already attended.

== History ==
Educational services at Yellowstone National Park began in 1886.

Circa the 1880s there were education programs for dependent children, involving a person paid by parents or a soldier providing such services. Some residents chose to send their children to schools in locations towards the east of the country or in Bozeman, Montana. At the time, a lack of transportation options made it difficult to send children to the school in Gardiner.

In 1921 the Mammoth School opened. Stephen Mather, the director of the National Park Service; and the wife of Horace W. Albright, the park superintendent, set up the school. The park superintendent himself appointed members of the school board. The initial campus was in a renovated facility previously used as a post exchange. It was the first school to be established on the property of an American national park. Its initial enrollment was 14. The school at first did not have a fixed location. Initially secondary school students were sent to Livingston, Montana.

By the 1930s, residents wanted to have a federally funded permanent school building in Mammoth because they were unable to vote in school board elections in Gardiner and because there were differences between them and people in Gardiner. In 1943, a letter was sent by the Yellowstone Park School Board to Lester C. Hunt, who was going to become the Governor of Wyoming, asking for money to fund the school; the letter stated that residents of Mammoth paid taxes to the State of Wyoming. Prior to 1948, no money nor supervision came from any state government.

In 1948, President of the United States Harry Truman signed a bill into law that provided for federal funding of the Yellowstone Park School, changing it from a private school to a public school. Wesley A. D'Ewart, a Congressman from Montana, had facilitated the bill. This was Public Law 604. The National Park Service began funding the school in 1949.

In 1963 a permanent building for the Mammoth School opened, using Mission 66 funding. The school building was also intended to be a community center. The building's architect was from Bozeman, Montana. A historian of the national park, Alicia Murphy, stated that due to the opening of the 1963 building, "we as National Park Service employees and parents could have more say in the curriculum and schooling of children." Hali Kirby-Ertel, who taught at Gardiner High School, stated that the development of a permanent Yellowstone Park School exacerbated the divisions between residents of Yellowstone National Park and Gardiner residents.

Prior to 2008, some of the students in Mammoth went to school in Gardiner, but at the time Wyoming did not have an agreement to pay Montana the tuition money. Circa 1963-2003, the time when Whitman was the principal of the Mammoth School, any area school district could receive a child living on the Yellowstone property, and the Gardiner school system received the largest share of children as it taught secondary school students living in Mammoth.

In 1993, the school had seven teachers and 40 students. In 1995 there were 29 students.

By 2008 more and more Yellowstone employees only were in Yellowstone during park season, and fewer employees had dependent children. Additionally, the interstate agreement to send Wyoming money to Montana was made circa that year. For those two reasons, in 2008 the Mammoth School closed. The Gardiner school now had an increase in enrollment from the elementary students in Mammoth. The money from Public Law 504 was received by Gardiner schools as well as the West Yellowstone, Montana school district (West Yellowstone K-12 Schools).

The former school building became a preschool and a community center.

== Operations ==
In 1997, all of the school funding came from the National Park Service.

In 1993, many students traveled to school by bicycle. The school did not operate any school buses. That year, all of the instructional staff resided in Mammoth.

The school had its own library. There had been plans of moving the Mammoth community library to the school. Anne Foster wrote in a 2017 report for the National Park Service that "this does not appear to have happened."

The school used Yellowstone National Park as a resource for its educational goals.

In the 1990s it had a summer school program open to Yellowstone and Gardiner residents. For swimming lessons, students were taken to Livingston, Montana as a municipal swimming pool was located there.

== Student body ==
Students came from all over the park property. The school used telecommunications software in case students from portions of the park property were unable to attend school due to weather or wildlife conditions.

Students often moved to and from the school as many of the students parents and/or guardians had temporary three to five year terms.

== See also ==
- Bureau of Indian Education (BIE) - Federal school system for Native American students
- Department of Defense Education Activity (DoDEA) - Federal school system for dependents of employees of the military
- Federal involvement in United States education
