= Brisbin, Montana =

Unincorporated community in Montana, United States

- Unincorporated community
- Location within Montana Location within the United States
- Coordinates: 45°31′23″N 110°36′31″W
- Country: United States
- State: Montana
- County: Park
- Elevation: 4,698 ft (1,432 m)
- Time zone: UTC-7 (Mountain (MST))
  - Summer (DST): UTC-6 (MDT)
- Area code: 406
- GNIS feature ID: 802059

Brisbin is an unincorporated community in Park County, Montana, United States.

== Notes ==
}
