= Emigrant Peak =

Mountain in Montana, United States

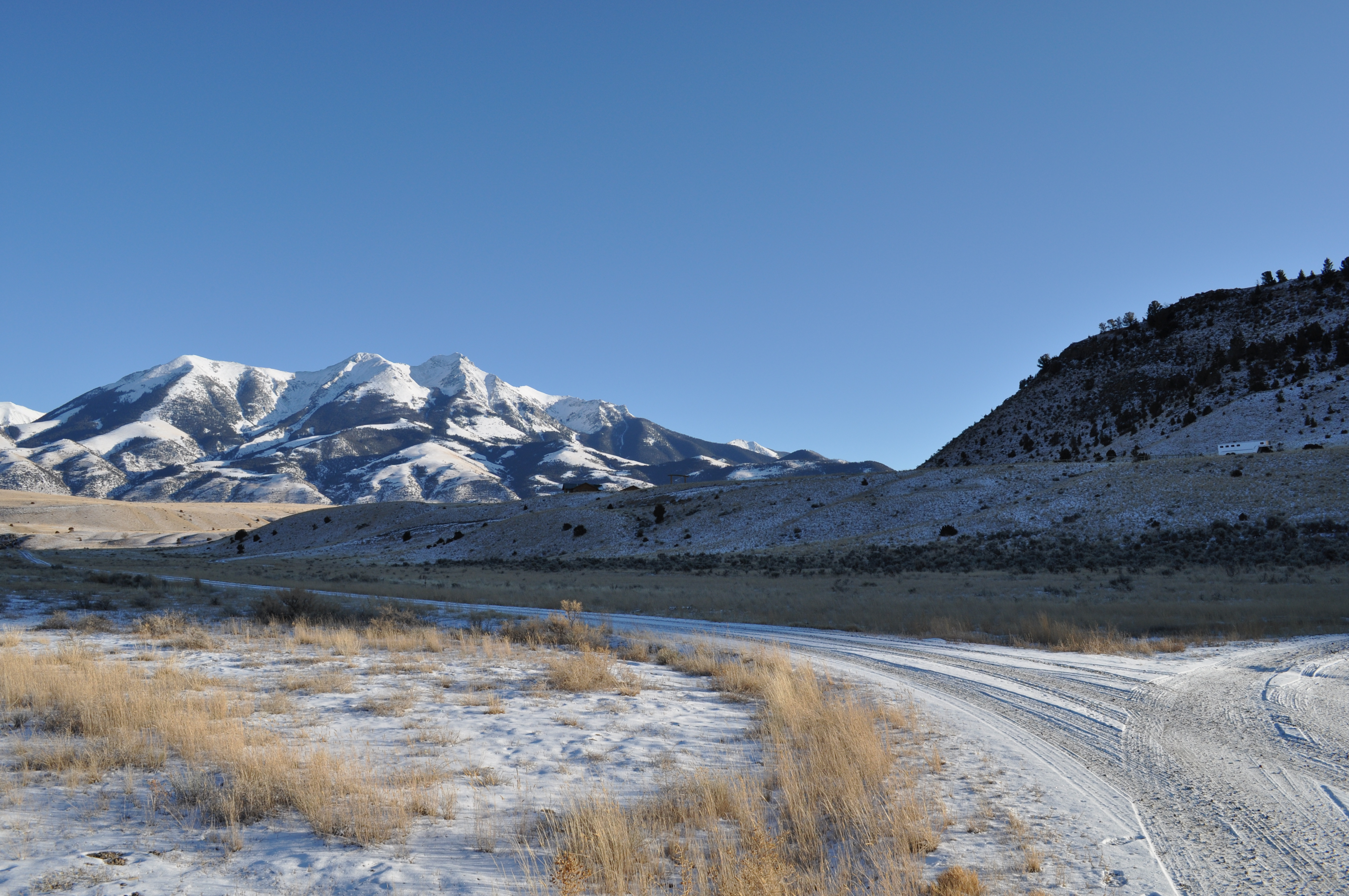
- Emigrant Peak from East River Road, 2009

Highest point
- Elevation: 10,926 ft (3,330 m) NAVD 88
- Prominence: 2609
- Coordinates: 45°15′47″N 110°42′26″W

Geography
- Location within Montana
- Location: Paradise Valley, Montana, east of Emigrant, Montana
- Parent range: Absaroka Range
- Topo map(s): USGS Emigrant, MT

Climbing
- First ascent: Unknown
- Easiest route: Hike

Emigrant Peak el. 10,926 feet (3,330 m) is a prominent mountain peak on the western edge of the Absaroka Range near Emigrant, Montana. The peak is flanked by Emigrant Gulch on the north and Sixmile Creek on the south with the Gallatin National Forest and lies just outside the Absaroka-Beartooth Wilderness. The peak is readily visible from Paradise Valley, Montana and U.S. Route 89 when traveling to the north entrance of Yellowstone National Park at Gardiner, Montana.

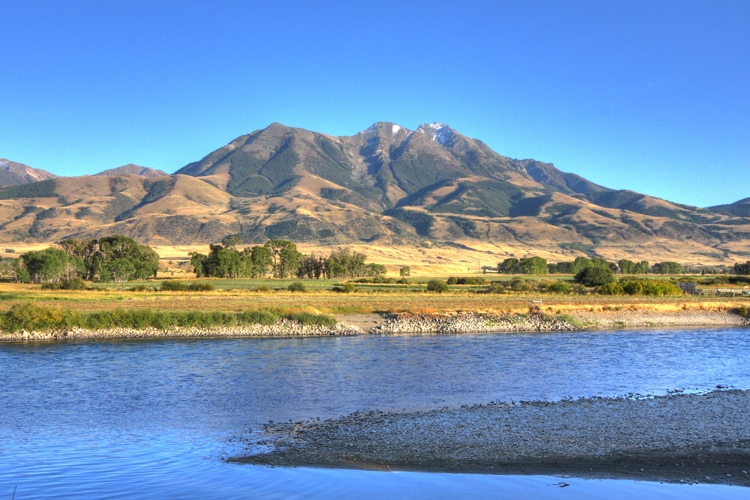
Emigrant Peak

== Notes ==
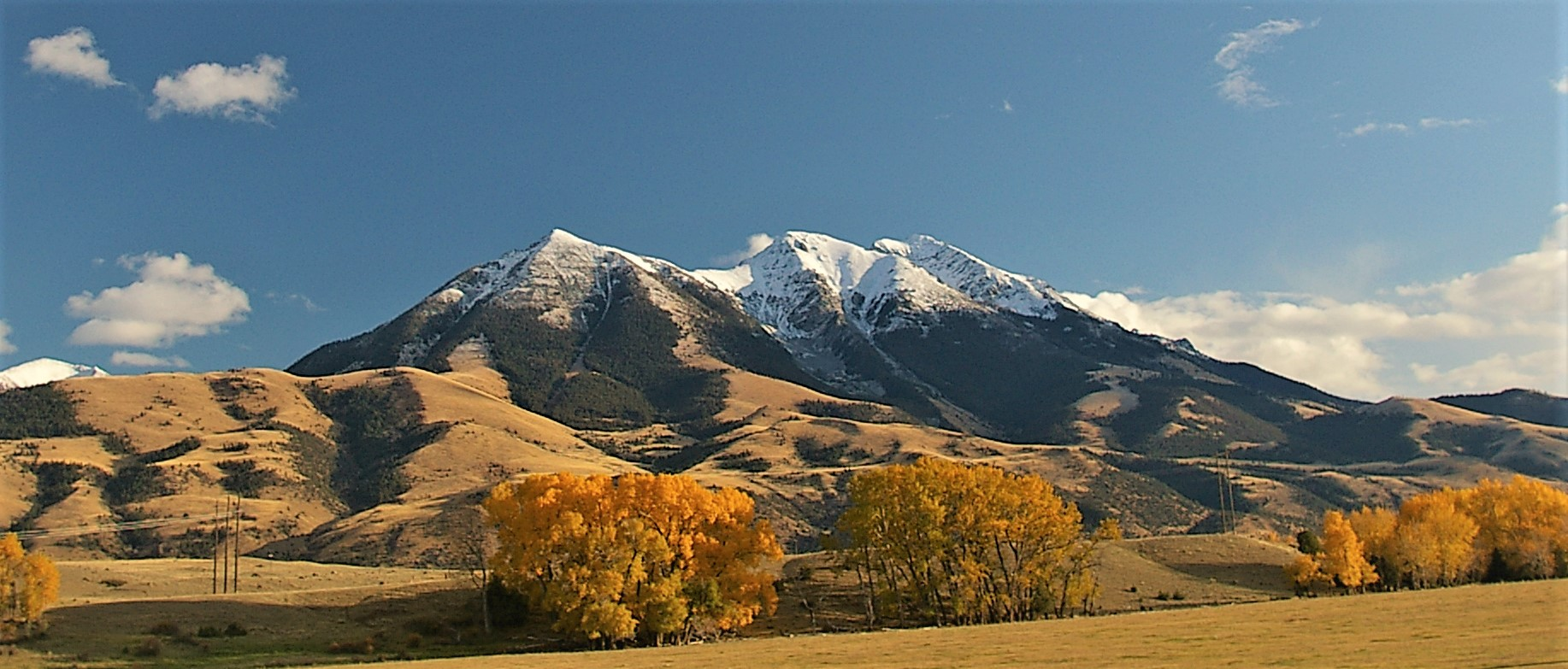
Emigrant Peak, Paradise Valley
