= Yellowstone National Park (part), Montana =

Coordinates: 45.019°N 111.075°W

Yellowstone National Park (part) was a former county-equivalent in southwestern Montana, a state in the northwestern United States.

== Geography ==
In 1872, Yellowstone National Park became the first national park in the United States and widely considered the first national park in the world.

In 1887, the portion of Yellowstone National Park in Montana was excluded from the jurisdiction of Park County and Gallatin County. Thus, it became a non-county area. Its boundaries were the same as the Montana section of Yellowstone National Park, which is primarily within Wyoming. In 1929, the non-county area expanded to reflect Yellowstone's extended boundaries in Montana. In 1932, the non-county area expanded once again to include Yellowstone's annexation of the Game Ranch in what is now Park County.

At its largest, the county-equivalent's total area was 246.11 square miles (637.42 km^{2}), with 245.38 square miles (635.54 km^{2}) of land and 0.727 square miles (1.884 km^{2}) of water.

On November 7, 1978, voters in Park County and Gallatin County approved the area's dissolution into the two original counties. Gallatin County acquired 99.15 square miles (256.81 km^{2}) of land area and 0.119 square miles (0.309 km^{2}) of water area, whereas Park County acquired 146.23 square miles (378.73 km^{2}) of land area and 0.608 square miles (1.575 km^{2}) of water area.

=== Census data ===
The United States Census Bureau did not adjust for the county-equivalent's dissolution until 1997, 19 years after the reapportionment into two counties. The transferred areas were then designated by the Census Bureau as Census Tract 14 in Gallatin County, and Census Tract 6 in Park County. The designations did not change the area's status as part of Yellowstone National Park.

In the 1990 census, the last one before the Census Bureau reapportionment, the county-equivalent had a population of 52 persons. In the 2000 census, the combined population of Tracts 6 and 14 had grown to 61 persons.

== See also ==
- Montana counties
- Yellowstone National Park topics
