= Lady Brisbane =

Lady Brisbane is a ship operated by Brisbane Cruises, which has been operating since 1987.

Originally built to operate out to the Great Barrier Reef, Lady Brisbane was built in 1972 by Milkraft in Brisbane, and has been renovated.

On 26 November 2011, Lady Brisbane accidentally grounded on the beach just north of the Tangalooma Resort on Moreton Island. No injuries were sustained, and her passengers were returned to Brisbane by another vessel. She remained stranded until the following day when another Spring Tide enabled her release. She was seen at RiverGate hardstand being assessed.
