= Gardiner High School =

Gardiner High School may refer to:

Turks and Caicos (United Kingdom)

- Raymond Gardiner High School, North Caicos

United States

- Gardiner High School (Maine)
- Gardiner High School (Montana)
