= Pray, Montana =

Unincorporated community in Montana, United States

- Census-designated place Unincorporated community
- Location within Montana Location within the United States
- Coordinates: 45°24′49″N 110°38′24″W
- Country: United States
- State: Montana
- County: Park

Area
  - Total: 29.15 sq mi (75.51 km^{2})
  - Land: 28.63 sq mi (74.14 km^{2})
  - Water: 0.53 sq mi (1.37 km^{2})
- Elevation: 4,823 ft (1,470 m)

Population (2020)
  - Total: 790
  - Density: 27.6/sq mi (10.66/km^{2})
- Time zone: UTC-7 (Mountain (MST))
  - Summer (DST): UTC-6 (MDT)
- ZIP code: 59065
- Area code: 406
- GNIS feature ID: 2583836

Pray is an unincorporated community in Park County, Montana, United States, in the Paradise Valley. The town was founded in 1907 by Valentine Eggar, an entrepreneur. He named it after Congressman Charles Nelson Pray. For statistical purposes, the United States Census Bureau has defined Pray as a census-designated place (CDP). The CDP does not correspond to the local understanding of the townsite. As of the 2020 census, Pray had a population of 790. Pray has a post office with ZIP code 59065, which opened on December 8, 1909.

The community is located on Highway 540 (East River Road), on the Yellowstone River. It is 22 miles (35 km) from Livingston, and 30 miles (48 km) from Yellowstone National Park. "Pray offers views of the Absaroka Mountain Range in the Gallatin National Forest."

In 2012, the five acres (2.0 ha) that make up the townsite of Pray were offered for sale by owner Barbara Walker, a photographer, for $1.4 million. The town "has been privately owned since it was founded." Walker's family began running the town in 1953.

== Demographics ==
Historical population
| Census | Pop. | Note | %± |
|---|---|---|---|
| 2020 | 790 | | — |
U.S. Decennial Census

== Education ==
The CDP is in Arrowhead Elementary School District and Park High School District. Park High School District is a component of Livingston Public Schools.
