= Electoral district of Brisbane =

Electoral district of Brisbane may refer to:

- Division of Brisbane (created 1901), electorate of the Australian House of Representatives
- Electoral district of Brisbane (New South Wales) (1859), former electorate of the New South Wales Legislative Assembly
- Electoral district of Town of Brisbane (1860–1873), former electorate of the Queensland Legislative Assembly
- Electoral district of Brisbane City (1873–1878), former electorate of the Queensland Legislative Assembly
- Electoral district of Brisbane (Queensland) (1912–1977), former electorate of the Queensland Legislative Assembly
- Electoral district of Brisbane Central (1977–2017), former electorate of the Queensland Legislative Assembly

== See also ==
- Electoral district of North Brisbane (1878–1888), former electorate of the Queensland Legislative Assembly
- Electoral district of Brisbane North (1888–1912), former electorate of the Queensland Legislative Assembly
- Electoral district of Town of South Brisbane (1860–1873), former electorate of the Queensland Legislative Assembly
- Electoral district of South Brisbane (created 1873), electorate of the Queensland Legislative Assembly
