= Brisbane (surname) =

Brisbane is a surname. Notable people with the surname include:

- Abbott Hall Brisbane (1804–1861), American military officer, plantation owner, and author
- Albert Brisbane (1809–1890), American author and theorist
- Arthur Brisbane (1864–1936), American newspaper editor
- Charles Brisbane (1769–1829), British naval officer
- James Brisbane (1774–1826), British naval officer
- Margaret Hunt Brisbane (1858–1925), American poet
- Matthew Brisbane (1787–1833), Scottish sailor
- Patrick Brisbane (1926–1974), Australian Anglican priest
- Thomas Brisbane (1773–1860), Scottish soldier and Governor of New South Wales
- William Henry Brisbane (1806–1878), abolitionist
