= Gardiner Public Schools =

School district in Montana, United States

- Gardiner, Montana; United States

Information
- Grades: Kindergarten–12

Gardiner Public Schools is a school district headquartered in Gardiner, Montana. It has two components: Gardiner Elementary School District and Gardiner High School District. The elementary school district includes the census-designated places of Gardiner, Corwin Springs, and Jardine. The high school district also includes Cooke City and Silver Gate. The district has additional students from Mammoth, Wyoming. As of 2020, the entire district has about 200 students.

All students are in one building, with Gardiner High School being one of the divisions.

== History ==
A school in Gardiner first opened in 1903. At the time, a lack of transportation options made it difficult to send children in Mammoth to the school in Gardiner. There were previously one room schoolhouses in rural areas near Gardiner; six rural schools in the southern part of the county consolidated into the Gardiner school system as transportation improved in the county.

In the 1930s, Yellowstone National Park officials made statements saying that they perceived the school facilities in Gardiner to be "very crowded and quite primitive".

In 1976, the Payment in Lieu of Taxes (PILT) was supposed to take effect, which meant that the Park Service was supposed to end the education payments. Steve Browne of the Cody Enterprise statedstated "Somehow that information got lost" and payments continued.

The Jardine Mine closed in 1996. After that point, enrollment in the Gardiner school system began to decline.

In the years prior to 2008, with improved transportation options, some Mammoth children went to school in Gardiner even though there was a school in Mammoth, the Yellowstone Park School; at the time Wyoming did not have an agreement to send money to Montana for the education of those children. Circa 2008 the interstate agreement to send money was made, and by then fewer children were in Mammoth. That year, the Mammoth school closed. Therefore there was a slight increase of enrollment in Gardiner schools around that time, although after that, the enrollment continued to decline.

In 2014 the NPS stated that it would stop paying to have students in the Mammoth area. The NPS bureaucracy discovered that it was not supposed to have paid the tuition money since 1976, and wanted Gardiner schools to repay those payments. Matt Mead, the Governor of Wyoming, began using an emergency fund to finance the education of these students. Additionally, in April 2014, the Park County School District No. 1 sent a payment to the Gardiner school district.

== Operations ==
In 2014 the school received money from the federal government as it educated students living on property owned by the federal government. Hali Kirby-Ertel, a teacher at Gardiner High School, stated that the Gardiner school system was "well funded" by federal authorities.

== Student body ==
Circa 2014 the collective enrollment was 230 for all grade levels, Kindergarten through 12.

== School culture ==
Kirby-Ertel, stated that there was a cultural division between students from Gardiner and students from Mammoth in 1999, the year he began working as a teacher at Gardiner High School. He wrote "It was the equivalent of the Jets and Sharks in a small Montana town."

== Athletics ==
Circa 2014 it was classified as "Class C" by the Montana school athletics association.
