= Park County, Montana =

County in Montana, United States

- County
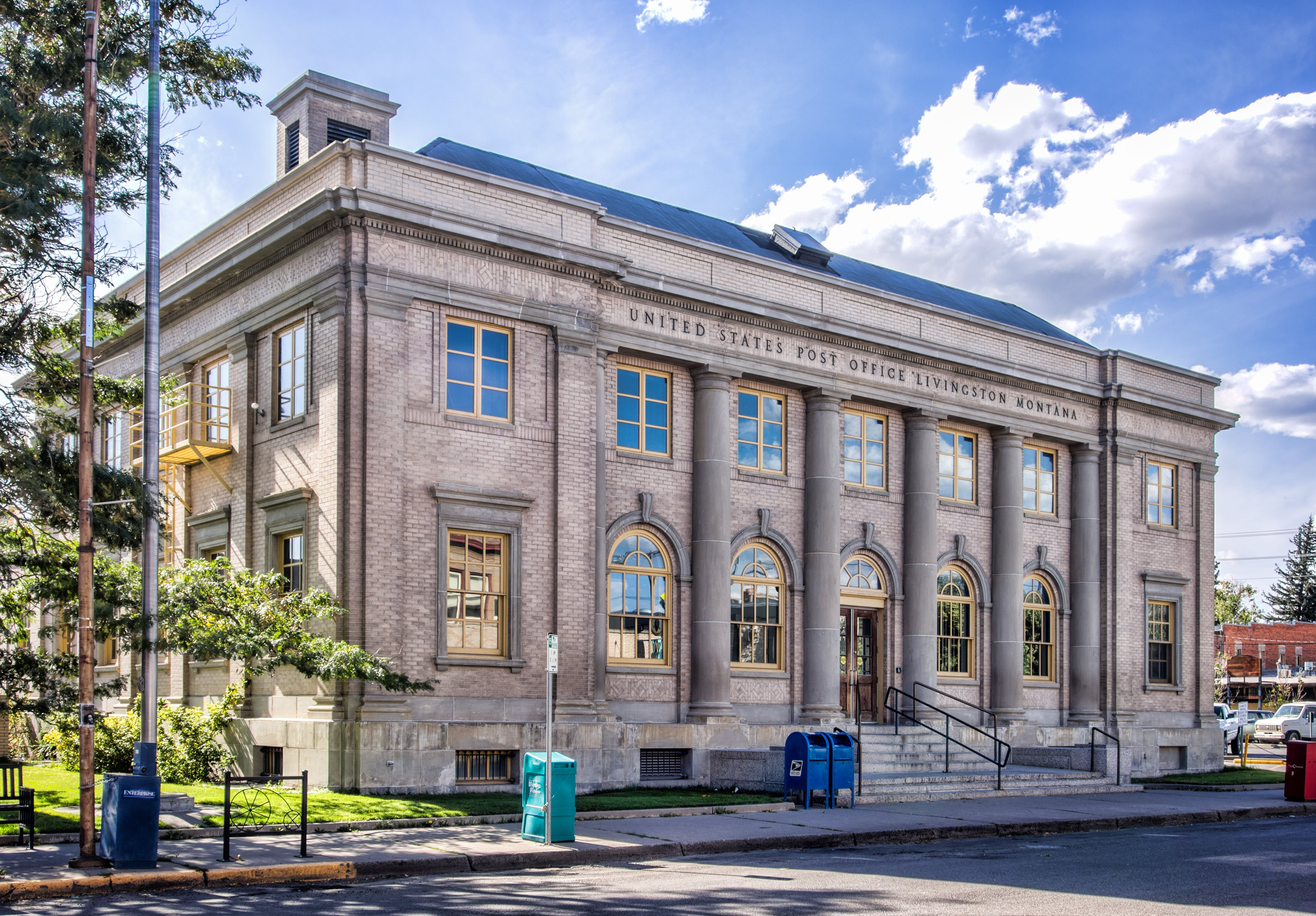
- US Post Office in Livingston, Montana

- Location within the U.S. state of Montana
- Coordinates: 45°30′N 110°31′W
- Country: United States
- State: Montana
- Founded: February 23, 1887
- Seat: Livingston
- Largest city: Livingston

Area
  - Total: 2,813 sq mi (7,290 km^{2})
  - Land: 2,803 sq mi (7,260 km^{2})
  - Water: 10 sq mi (26 km^{2}) 0.4%

Population (2020)
  - Total: 17,191
  - Estimate (2025): 18,214 ▲
  - Density: 6.133/sq mi (2.368/km^{2})
- Time zone: UTC−7 (Mountain)
  - Summer (DST): UTC−6 (MDT)
- Area code: 406
- Congressional district: 2nd
- Website: www.parkcountymt.gov
- Montana county number 49

Park County is a county in the U.S. state of Montana. At the 2020 census, the population was 17,191. Its county seat is Livingston. A small part of Yellowstone National Park is in the southern part of the county.

== History ==
The Territorial Legislature of Montana Territory authorized Park County on February 23, 1887. It was named for its proximity to Yellowstone National Park, part of which is now in the county.

This area had long been peopled and hunted by indigenous peoples, including the Crow, Sioux, and Blackfoot tribes. The first recorded visit of European-descent people was the Lewis and Clark Expedition (1805). Mountain man Jim Bridger wintered with Crow nomads near present-day Emigrant in 1844–45.

Hunting and trapping brought many men across this area during the first part of the 19th century, but by 1850 the beaver population had nearly disappeared. Gold was discovered in Emigrant Gulch in 1863, and by 1864 a booming town was serving the area. In late 1864, Yellowstone City, consisting of 75 cabins, was in operation.

Two miners, John Bozeman and John Jacobs, laid out the Bozeman Trail in 1864 to allow access to western Montana Territory, and it soon became a well-traveled path between Fort Laramie and western Montana. The road ran through the future Livingston area to Bozeman Pass. By the late 1860s considerable traffic was also arriving (and departing) via the Yellowstone River, at an embarkation point in the Livingston area.

By the late 1860s, the indigenous peoples, denied access to their previous areas, had become a danger to the settlers, so Territorial Governor Green Clay Smith organized a militia to guard the Livingston area. The group of 600 men encamped at Fort Howie, near the mouth of Shields River, five miles (8.0 km) east of present-day Livingston.

In 1868 an Indian agency (including a fortified structure) was established on the Crow Reservation, at Mission Creek, southeast of Livingston. A ferry service to the fort was set up to cross the Yellowstone River, four miles (6.4 km) east of present-day Livingston. Benson's Landing was the small settlement that grew around the landing, and was a bustling community center for a few decades.

Interest in the Yellowstone Park area grew around 1870. By 1872, the federal government had established it as the country's first national park. By 1880 the population of the future Park County was 200. In 1881 the Northern Pacific Railway entered Montana Territory and extended a line to Livingston (which by this time had 500 inhabitants) by November 22, 1882. In 1883 the National Park branch of the Northern Pacific was completed; that year also saw completion of the east–west link of the NP lines, opening the northern part of the nation to commerce and settlement. The local population continued to grow rapidly; by 1887 the territorial legislature had authorized a county and its government had been set into motion. By 1890 the county population had reached 6,900.

== Geography ==
According to the United States Census Bureau, the county has an area of 2,813 square miles (7,290 km^{2}), of which 2,803 square miles (7,260 km^{2}) is land and 10.4 square miles (27 km^{2}) (0.4%) is water. The highest natural point in Montana, Granite Peak at 12,807 feet (3,904 m), is in Park County. The county attained its present boundaries in 1978, when the former Yellowstone National Park (part) county-equivalent was dissolved and apportioned between Gallatin County and Park County. Gallatin County received 99.155 square miles (256.81 km^{2}) of land area and 0.119 square miles (0.31 km^{2}) of water area, whereas Park County received 146.229 square miles (378.73 km^{2}) of land and 0.608 square miles (1.57 km^{2}) of water. The geographies transferred are known as Census Tract 14 in Gallatin County and Census Tract 6 in Park County.

=== Major highways ===
- Interstate 90
- U.S. Highway 89
- U.S. Highway 191
- U.S. Highway 212
- Montana Highway 86

=== Transit ===
- Jefferson Lines

=== Adjacent counties ===
- Gallatin County – west
- Meagher County – north
- Sweet Grass County – east
- Stillwater County – southeast
- Carbon County – southeast
- Park County, Wyoming – south

=== National protected areas ===
- Custer National Forest (part)
- Gallatin National Forest (part)
- Lewis and Clark National Forest (part)
- Yellowstone National Park (part)

== Politics ==
Voters in Park County tend to support the Republican Party candidate in national elections (79% since 1904).

United States presidential election results for Park County, Montana
Year	Republican		Democratic		Third party(ies)	
Year	No.	%	No.	%	No.	%
1892	1,192	49.81%	1,048	43.79%	153	6.39%
1896	328	20.62%	1,252	78.69%	11	0.69%
1900	903	47.98%	900	47.82%	79	4.20%
1904	1,408	59.51%	583	24.64%	375	15.85%
1908	1,305	50.92%	952	37.14%	306	11.94%
1912	609	27.59%	666	30.18%	932	42.23%
1916	1,957	45.42%	2,050	47.57%	302	7.01%
1920	2,537	63.11%	1,155	28.73%	328	8.16%
1924	2,199	50.70%	688	15.86%	1,450	33.43%
1928	3,095	68.84%	1,338	29.76%	63	1.40%
1932	1,895	41.12%	2,533	54.96%	181	3.93%
1936	1,583	33.03%	2,968	61.92%	242	5.05%
1940	2,433	45.74%	2,833	53.26%	53	1.00%
1944	2,396	51.23%	2,245	48.00%	36	0.77%
1948	2,461	50.79%	2,222	45.86%	162	3.34%
1952	4,152	67.51%	1,969	32.02%	29	0.47%
1956	3,733	63.44%	2,151	36.56%	0	0.00%
1960	3,329	59.44%	2,249	40.15%	23	0.41%
1964	2,619	48.03%	2,824	51.79%	10	0.18%
1968	3,063	57.36%	1,815	33.99%	462	8.65%
1972	3,771	63.89%	1,923	32.58%	208	3.52%
1976	3,281	57.16%	2,364	41.18%	95	1.66%
1980	3,929	63.42%	1,663	26.84%	603	9.73%
1984	4,115	62.53%	2,387	36.27%	79	1.20%
1988	3,823	59.13%	2,526	39.07%	116	1.79%
1992	2,846	38.04%	2,258	30.18%	2,378	31.78%
1996	3,837	51.52%	2,564	34.43%	1,047	14.06%
2000	4,523	61.07%	2,154	29.08%	729	9.84%
2004	4,771	58.06%	3,199	38.93%	248	3.02%
2008	4,376	49.18%	4,173	46.90%	349	3.92%
2012	4,709	53.71%	3,783	43.15%	276	3.15%
2016	4,980	53.21%	3,595	38.41%	784	8.38%
2020	6,025	52.08%	5,280	45.64%	264	2.28%
2024	6,128	52.30%	5,224	44.58%	365	3.12%

== Demographics ==
Historical population
Census	Pop.	Note	%±
1890	6,881		—
1900	7,341		6.7%
1910	10,731		46.2%
1920	11,330		5.6%
1930	10,922		−3.6%
1940	11,566		5.9%
1950	11,999		3.7%
1960	13,168		9.7%
1970	11,197		−15.0%
1980	12,869		14.9%
1990	14,562		13.2%
2000	15,694		7.8%
2010	15,636		−0.4%
2020	17,191		9.9%
2025 (est.)	18,214	▲	6.0%
U.S. Decennial Census; 1790–1960 1900–1990; 1990–2000 2010–2020

=== 2020 census ===
As of the 2020 census, the county had a population of 17,191. Of the residents, 17.0% were under the age of 18 and 23.2% were 65 years of age or older; the median age was 46.9 years. For every 100 females there were 101.8 males, and for every 100 females age 18 and over there were 100.4 males. 54.4% of residents lived in urban areas and 45.6% lived in rural areas.

The racial makeup of the county was 92.2% White, 0.4% Black or African American, 0.9% American Indian and Alaska Native, 0.4% Asian, 0.8% from some other race, and 5.3% from two or more races. Hispanic or Latino residents of any race comprised 3.0% of the population.

There were 7,997 households in the county, of which 21.0% had children under the age of 18 living with them and 23.9% had a female householder with no spouse or partner present. About 34.3% of all households were made up of individuals and 14.9% had someone living alone who was 65 years of age or older.

There were 9,554 housing units, of which 16.3% were vacant. Among occupied housing units, 67.0% were owner-occupied and 33.0% were renter-occupied. The homeowner vacancy rate was 1.6% and the rental vacancy rate was 5.0%.

=== 2010 census ===
As of the 2010 census, there were 15,636 people, 7,310 households, and 4,177 families residing in the county. The population density was 5.6 inhabitants per square mile (2.2/km^{2}). There were 9,375 housing units at an average density of 3.3 units per square mile (1.3/km^{2}). The racial makeup of the county was 96.5% white, 0.8% American Indian, 0.3% Asian, 0.1% black or African American, 0.5% from other races, and 1.6% from two or more races. Those of Hispanic or Latino origin made up 2.1% of the population. In terms of ancestry, 26.2% were German, 17.3% were English, 16.2% were Irish, 10.9% were Norwegian, and 7.4% were American.

Of the 7,310 households, 23.5% had children under the age of 18 living with them, 46.7% were married couples living together, 7.0% had a female householder with no husband present, 42.9% were non-families, and 35.7% of all households were made up of individuals. The average household size was 2.12 and the average family size was 2.75. The median age was 45.4 years.

The median income for a household in the county was $38,830 and the median income for a family was $50,252. Males had a median income of $36,878 versus $31,062 for females. The per capita income for the county was $24,717. About 7.7% of families and 13.6% of the population were below the poverty line, including 19.3% of those under age 18 and 10.7% of those age 65 or over.

== Communities ==
=== City ===
- Livingston (county seat)

=== Town ===
- Clyde Park

=== Census-designated places ===
- Cooke City
- Corwin Springs
- Emigrant
- Gardiner
- Jardine
- Pine Creek
- Pray
- Silver Gate
- South Glastonbury
- Springdale
- Wilsall
- Wineglass

=== Other unincorporated communities ===
- Brisbin
- Carbella
- Chadborn
- Chico
- Chimney Rock
- Contact
- Grannis
- Hoppers
- Hunters Hot Springs
- Independence
- Kotke
- Miner
- Sphinx
- White City

=== Ghost town ===
- Aldridge

== Education ==
Gardiner Public Schools has two components: Gardiner Elementary School District and Gardiner High School District.

Livingston Public Schools has two components: Livingston Elementary School District and Park High School District.

Shields Valley Public Schools has two components: Shields Valley Elementary School District and Shields Valley High School District.

High school districts:

- Gardiner High School District
- Park High School District
- Shields Valley High School District

Elementary school districts:

- Arrowhead Elementary School District
- Cooke City Elementary School District
- Gardiner Elementary School District
- Livingston Elementary School District
- Pine Creek Elementary School District
- Shields Valley Elementary School District

== See also ==
- List of lakes in Park County, Montana
- List of mountains in Park County, Montana
- National Register of Historic Places listings in Park County, Montana
