= List of counties in Montana =

Counties of Montana
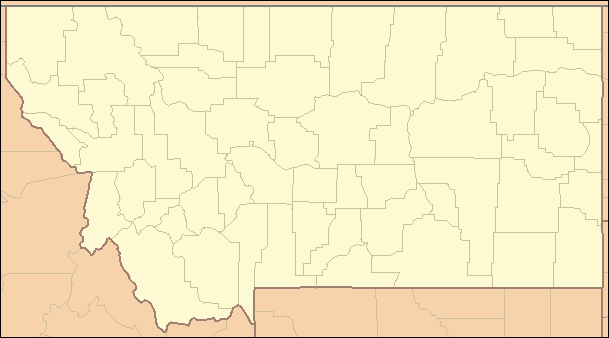
- Location: State of Montana
- Number: 56
- Populations: 548 (Petroleum) – 172,692 (Yellowstone)
- Areas: 718 square miles (1,860 km^{2}) (Silver Bow) – 5,543 square miles (14,360 km^{2}) (Beaverhead)
- Government: County government
- Subdivisions: Cities, towns, unincorporated communities, Indian reservations, census-designated places

This is a list of the counties in the U.S. state of Montana. There are 56 counties in the state.

Montana has two consolidated city-counties—Anaconda with Deer Lodge County and Butte with Silver Bow County. The portion of Yellowstone National Park that lies within Montana was not part of any county until 1978, when part of it was nominally added to Gallatin County, and the rest of it to Park County.

Montana's postal abbreviation is MT and its FIPS state code is 30.

== Counties ==
The Federal Information Processing Standard (FIPS) code, which is used by the United States government to uniquely identify counties, is provided for each county. The FIPS code for each county links to census data for that county.

County	FIPS code	County seat	Est.	Origin	Etymology	License plate prefix	Population	Area	Map
Beaverhead County	001	Dillon	Jan 16, 1864	Original County	Beaverhead Rock in the Jefferson River, which is shaped like a beaver's head.	18	10,043	5,543 sq mi (14,356 km^{2})	State map highlighting Beaverhead County
Big Horn County	003	Hardin	Jan 13, 1913	Rosebud County, Yellowstone County	Bighorn sheep in the area.	22	12,752	4,995 sq mi (12,937 km^{2})	State map highlighting Big Horn County
Blaine County	005	Chinook	Feb 29, 1912	Chouteau County	James G. Blaine (1830–1893), United States Secretary of State and presidential candidate.	24	6,860	4,226 sq mi (10,945 km^{2})	State map highlighting Blaine County
Broadwater County	007	Townsend	Mar 1, 1897	Jefferson County, Meagher County	Charles A. Broadwater (1840–1892), a pioneer in the area and colonel in the United States Army.	43	8,493	1,192 sq mi (3,087 km^{2})	State map highlighting Broadwater County
Carbon County	009	Red Lodge	May 1, 1895	Park County, Yellowstone County	Coal deposits in the area.	10	11,466	2,048 sq mi (5,304 km^{2})	State map highlighting Carbon County
Carter County	011	Ekalaka	Feb 22, 1917	Fallon County	Thomas Henry Carter (1854–1911), a U.S. Senator from Montana.	42	1,383	3,340 sq mi (8,651 km^{2})	State map highlighting Carter County
Cascade County	013	Great Falls	Dec 19, 1887	Chouteau County, Meagher County	Great Falls of the Missouri River.	2	85,029	2,698 sq mi (6,988 km^{2})	State map highlighting Cascade County
Chouteau County	015	Fort Benton	Jan 16, 1864	Original County	Jean Pierre Chouteau (1758–1849) and his son Pierre Chouteau, Jr. (1789–1865). They were part of the Chouteau fur-trading family.	19	5,865	3,973 sq mi (10,290 km^{2})	State map highlighting Chouteau County
Custer County	017	Miles City	Jan 16, 1864	Original County	Originally Big Horn County, renamed February 16, 1877 for George Armstrong Custer	14	12,034	3,783 sq mi (9,798 km^{2})	State map highlighting Custer County
Daniels County	019	Scobey	Aug 30, 1920	Sheridan County, Valley County	Mansfield A. Daniels (1858 - 1919), an early rancher and storekeeper	37	1,612	1,426 sq mi (3,693 km^{2})	State map highlighting Daniels County
Dawson County	021	Glendive	Jan 16, 1864	Unorganized lands	Andrew Dawson, a trapping official and major in the United States Army	16	8,692	2,373 sq mi (6,146 km^{2})	State map highlighting Dawson County
Deer Lodge County	023	Anaconda	Jan 16, 1864	Original County	Deer Lodge Valley, which in turn was either named for the Native American name "Lodge of the White-tailed Deer" or a salt lick where deer came in droves	30	9,709	737 sq mi (1,909 km^{2})	State map highlighting Deer Lodge County
Fallon County	025	Baker	Dec 9, 1913	Custer County	Benjamin O'Fallon, a Federal Native American agent	39	2,959	1,620 sq mi (4,196 km^{2})	State map highlighting Fallon County
Fergus County	027	Lewistown	Dec 1, 1886	Chouteau County, Meagher County	Andrew Fergus (1850 - 1928), one of the first settlers in the county	8	11,825	4,339 sq mi (11,238 km^{2})	State map highlighting Fergus County
Flathead County	029	Kalispell	Mar 1, 1893	Missoula County	Flathead Native Americans	7	115,429	5,099 sq mi (13,206 km^{2})	State map highlighting Flathead County
Gallatin County	031	Bozeman	Feb 2, 1865	Original County	Albert Gallatin (1761–1849), the United States Secretary of the Treasury at the time of the Lewis and Clark Expedition	6	128,740	2,507 sq mi (6,493 km^{2})	State map highlighting Gallatin County
Garfield County	033	Jordan	Apr 1, 1919	Dawson County	James A. Garfield (1831–1881), the twentieth President of the United States	50	1,148	4,668 sq mi (12,090 km^{2})	State map highlighting Garfield County
Glacier County	035	Cut Bank	Apr 1, 1919	Teton County	Glacier National Park, which borders the county	38	13,463	2,995 sq mi (7,757 km^{2})	State map highlighting Glacier County
Golden Valley County	037	Ryegate	Oct 4, 1920	Musselshell County, Sweet Grass County	Probably named in a promotional attempt to lure settlers to the area	53	844	1,175 sq mi (3,043 km^{2})	State map highlighting Golden Valley County
Granite County	039	Philipsburg	Mar 2, 1893	Deer Lodge County, Missoula County	Named for the granite rock which is common in the area's mountains and also held the area's rich gold and silver ore; the old mining town of Granite shared the name.	46	3,658	1,728 sq mi (4,475 km^{2})	State map highlighting Granite County
Hill County	041	Havre	Feb 28, 1912	Chouteau County	James J. Hill (1838–1916), a leading railroad tycoon	12	16,167	2,896 sq mi (7,501 km^{2})	State map highlighting Hill County
Jefferson County	043	Boulder	Jan 16, 1864	Original County	Thomas Jefferson (1743–1826), the third President of the United States	51	13,329	1,657 sq mi (4,292 km^{2})	State map highlighting Jefferson County
Judith Basin County	045	Stanford	Dec 10, 1920	Cascade County, Fergus County	The Judith River which was in turn named by William Clark for Julia "Judith" Hancock, whom he would later marry	36	2,162	1,870 sq mi (4,843 km^{2})	State map highlighting Judith Basin County
Lake County	047	Polson	Aug 10, 1923	Flathead County, Missoula County	Flathead Lake	15	33,392	1,494 sq mi (3,869 km^{2})	State map highlighting Lake County
Lewis and Clark County	049	Helena	Feb 2, 1865	Original County	Originally Edgerton County), renamed March 1, 1868 for Meriwether Lewis and William Clark	5	75,331	3,461 sq mi (8,964 km^{2})	State map highlighting Lewis and Clark County
Liberty County	051	Chester	Feb 11, 1920	Chouteau County, Hill County	The sentiment of the inhabitants when the county was formed soon after World War I	48	1,957	1,430 sq mi (3,704 km^{2})	State map highlighting Liberty County
Lincoln County	053	Libby	Jul 1, 1909	Flathead County	Abraham Lincoln (1809–1865), the 16th President of the United States	56	22,328	3,613 sq mi (9,358 km^{2})	State map highlighting Lincoln County
Madison County	057	Virginia City	Jan 16, 1864	Original County	James Madison (1751–1836), the fourth President of the United States and the Secretary of State at the time of the Lewis and Clark Expedition	25	10,026	3,587 sq mi (9,290 km^{2})	State map highlighting Madison County
McCone County	055	Circle	Apr 1, 1919	Dawson County, Richland County	George McCone (1853 - 1929), a Montana state senator who helped create the county	41	1,720	2,643 sq mi (6,845 km^{2})	State map highlighting McCone County
Meagher County	059	White Sulphur Springs	Mar 26, 1866	Chouteau County, Gallatin County	Thomas Francis Meagher (1823–1867), an acting Governor of the Montana Territory	47	2,137	2,392 sq mi (6,195 km^{2})	State map highlighting Meagher County
Mineral County	061	Superior	Aug 7, 1914	Missoula County	Many mines and mining prospects within the county	54	5,185	1,220 sq mi (3,160 km^{2})	State map highlighting Mineral County
Missoula County	063	Missoula	Dec 14, 1860	Original County	Supposedly a contraction of the Flathead word, "im-i-sul-e-etiku", meaning "by or near the place of fear or ambush", a reference to Hell Gate Canyon, in which Flathead Native Americans were sometimes attacked by Blackfeet	4	123,513	2,598 sq mi (6,729 km^{2})	State map highlighting Missoula County
Musselshell County	065	Roundup	Mar 1, 1911	Fergus County, Meagher County, Yellowstone County	The Musselshell River, named in turn by the Lewis and Clark Expedition presumably due to mussels found on its banks	23	5,582	1,867 sq mi (4,836 km^{2})	State map highlighting Musselshell County
Park County	067	Livingston	May 1, 1887	Gallatin County	Nearby Yellowstone National Park	49	18,214	2,656 sq mi (6,879 km^{2})	State map highlighting Park County
Petroleum County	069	Winnett	Feb 22, 1925	Fergus County	The production of petroleum at Cat Creek	55	548	1,654 sq mi (4,284 km^{2})	State map highlighting Petroleum County
Phillips County	071	Malta	Feb 5, 1915	Blaine County, Valley County	Benjamin D. Phillips (1857 - 1926), a leading rancher and early pioneer in the county	11	4,203	5,140 sq mi (13,313 km^{2})	State map highlighting Phillips County
Pondera County	073	Conrad	Apr 1, 1919	Chouteau County, Teton County	Originally pend d'oreille, French words meaning "ear pendant"; the name was changed to a form resembling the phonetic spelling to avoid confusion with the lake and town of the same name in Idaho and of a county in Washington.	26	6,072	1,625 sq mi (4,209 km^{2})	State map highlighting Pondera County
Powder River County	075	Broadus	Apr 1, 1919	Custer County	The Powder River, named in turn for the gunpowder-like sand on its shores	9	1,781	3,297 sq mi (8,539 km^{2})	State map highlighting Powder River County
Powell County	077	Deer Lodge	Feb 1, 1901	Deer Lodge County	Mount Powell, which in turn was named for John Wesley Powell (1834–1902), the early environmentalist and explorer	28	7,157	2,326 sq mi (6,024 km^{2})	State map highlighting Powell County
Prairie County	079	Terry	Feb 5, 1915	Dawson County, Fallon County	The county's location on the Great Plains	45	1,112	1,737 sq mi (4,499 km^{2})	State map highlighting Prairie County
Ravalli County	081	Hamilton	Apr 1, 1893	Missoula County	Anthony Ravalli (1812–1884), a Jesuit missionary who came to the area in 1845	13	48,582	2,394 sq mi (6,200 km^{2})	State map highlighting Ravalli County
Richland County	083	Sidney	May 27, 1914	Dawson County	Named so as to depict fertile soil, in an attempt to lure in settlers	27	11,377	2,084 sq mi (5,398 km^{2})	State map highlighting Richland County
Roosevelt County	085	Wolf Point	Feb 18, 1919	Sheridan County	Theodore Roosevelt (1858–1919), the 26th President of the United States	17	10,242	2,356 sq mi (6,102 km^{2})	State map highlighting Roosevelt County
Rosebud County	087	Forsyth	Mar 1, 1901	Custer County	The Rosebud River, which was named for the many wild roses along its banks	29	8,253	5,012 sq mi (12,981 km^{2})	State map highlighting Rosebud County
Sanders County	089	Thompson Falls	Mar 1, 1906	Missoula County	Wilbur Fiske Sanders (1834–1905), a pioneer, vigilante, and U.S. Senator from Montana	35	14,062	2,762 sq mi (7,154 km^{2})	State map highlighting Sanders County
Sheridan County	091	Plentywood	Mar 24, 1913	Valley County	Philip Sheridan (1831–1888), Civil War general	34	3,436	1,677 sq mi (4,343 km^{2})	State map highlighting Sheridan County
Silver Bow County	093	Butte	Feb 16, 1881	Deer Lodge County	Silver Bow Creek; there are multiple theories explaining how the creek was named	1	36,118	718 sq mi (1,860 km^{2})	State map highlighting Silver Bow County
Stillwater County	095	Columbus	Mar 24, 1913	Carbon County, Sweet Grass County, Yellowstone County	Stillwater River, ironically named for its very fast current	32	9,445	1,795 sq mi (4,649 km^{2})	State map highlighting Stillwater County
Sweet Grass County	097	Big Timber	Mar 5, 1895	Meagher County, Park County, Yellowstone County	The abundant sweet grass in the county	40	3,762	1,855 sq mi (4,804 km^{2})	State map highlighting Sweet Grass County
Teton County	099	Choteau	Mar 1, 1893	Chouteau County	The Teton Range which is in turn named for the French word for 'nipple', teton	31	6,496	2,273 sq mi (5,887 km^{2})	State map highlighting Teton County
Toole County	101	Shelby	May 7, 1914	Hill County, Teton County	Joseph Toole (1851–1929), the first and fourth Governor of Montana	21	5,211	1,911 sq mi (4,949 km^{2})	State map highlighting Toole County
Treasure County	103	Hysham	Apr 1, 1919	Rosebud County	Named promotionally to attract new settlers	33	728	979 sq mi (2,536 km^{2})	State map highlighting Treasure County
Valley County	105	Glasgow	Mar 1, 1893	Dawson County	Much of the county lies within the valley of the Milk River	20	7,385	4,921 sq mi (12,745 km^{2})	State map highlighting Valley County
Wheatland County	107	Harlowton	Apr 1, 1917	Meagher County, Sweet Grass County	The many wheat fields in the county	44	2,100	1,423 sq mi (3,686 km^{2})	State map highlighting Wheatland County
Wibaux County	109	Wibaux	Aug 17, 1914	Dawson County, Fallon County, Richland County	Pierre Wibaux (1858–1913), a pioneer and cattleman	52	885	889 sq mi (2,302 km^{2})	State map highlighting Wibaux County
Yellowstone County	111	Billings	Feb 26, 1883	Custer County	The Yellowstone River, named in turn for the yellow rocks found along its shores	3	172,692	2,635 sq mi (6,825 km^{2})	State map highlighting Yellowstone County

== Racial / Ethnic Profile of counties in Montana (2020 Census) ==
Racial / Ethnic Profile of counties in Montana (2020 Census)
Following is a table of counties in Montana by race/ethnicity. The majority racial/ethnic group is coded per the key below.

Majority minority with no dominant group
Majority White
Majority Black
Majority Hispanic
Majority Asian
Majority Native American

Racial and ethnic composition of counties in Montana (2020 Census) (NH = Non-Hispanic) Note: the US Census treats Hispanic/Latino as an ethnic category. This table excludes Latinos from the racial categories and assigns them to a separate category. Hispanics/Latinos may be of any race.
County	Location of County	Total Population	White alone (NH)	%	Black or African American alone (NH)	%	Native American or Alaska Native alone (NH)	%	Asian alone (NH)	%	Pacific Islander alone (NH)	%	Other race alone (NH)	%	Mixed race or Multiracial (NH)	%	Hispanic or Latino (any race)	%
Beaverhead		9,371	8,330	88.89%	24	0.26%	120	1.28%	37	0.39%	3	0.03%	40	0.43%	386	4.12%	431	4.60%
Big Horn		13,124	3,407	25.96%	11	0.08%	8,627	65.73%	44	0.34%	9	0.07%	3	0.02%	508	3.87%	515	3.92%
Blaine		7,044	2,942	41.77%	10	0.14%	3,621	51.41%	13	0.18%	0	0.00%	35	0.50%	265	3.76%	158	2.24%
Broadwater		6,774	6,149	90.77%	17	0.25%	44	0.65%	5	0.07%	0	0.00%	24	0.35%	335	4.95%	200	2.95%
Carbon		10,473	9,603	91.69%	13	0.12%	97	0.93%	21	0.20%	0	0.00%	45	0.43%	433	4.13%	261	2.49%
Carter		1,415	1,341	94.77%	0	0.00%	7	0.49%	1	0.07%	0	0.00%	4	0.28%	51	3.60%	11	0.78%
Cascade		84,414	68,794	81.50%	1,085	1.29%	3,725	4.41%	908	1.08%	105	0.12%	441	0.52%	5,344	6.33%	4,012	4.75%
Chouteau		5,895	4,172	70.77%	10	0.17%	1,347	22.85%	18	0.31%	0	0.00%	10	0.17%	179	3.04%	159	2.70%
Custer		11,867	10,701	90.17%	71	0.60%	192	1.62%	52	0.44%	7	0.06%	13	0.11%	469	3.95%	362	3.05%
Daniels		1,661	1,467	88.32%	0	0.00%	34	2.05%	13	0.78%	0	0.00%	0	0.00%	98	5.90%	49	2.95%
Dawson		8,940	7,969	89.14%	38	0.43%	166	1.86%	57	0.64%	1	0.01%	30	0.34%	391	4.37%	288	3.22%
Deer Lodge		9,421	8,514	90.37%	23	0.24%	222	2.36%	33	0.35%	2	0.02%	15	0.16%	352	3.74%	260	2.76%
Fallon		3,049	2,858	93.74%	5	0.16%	27	0.89%	5	0.16%	2	0.07%	1	0.03%	88	2.89%	63	2.07%
Fergus		11,446	10,566	92.31%	21	0.18%	124	1.08%	38	0.33%	0	0.00%	33	0.29%	439	3.84%	225	1.97%
Flathead		104,357	93,416	89.52%	269	0.26%	931	0.89%	703	0.67%	77	0.07%	459	0.44%	5,173	4.96%	3,329	3.19%
Gallatin		118,960	104,003	87.43%	493	0.41%	922	0.77%	1,389	1.17%	91	0.08%	549	0.46%	5,618	4.72%	5,895	4.95%
Garfield		1,173	1,125	95.91%	0	0.00%	9	0.77%	2	0.17%	1	0.09%	0	0.00%	22	1.88%	14	1.19%
Glacier		13,778	3,496	25.37%	19	0.14%	9,085	65.94%	39	0.28%	16	0.12%	10	0.07%	812	5.89%	301	2.18%
Golden Valley		823	724	87.97%	7	0.85%	1	0.12%	0	0.00%	1	0.12%	11	1.34%	44	5.35%	35	4.25%
Granite		3,309	3,066	92.66%	0	0.00%	24	0.73%	3	0.09%	0	0.00%	13	0.39%	118	3.57%	85	2.57%
Hill		16,309	11,020	67.57%	44	0.27%	3,671	22.51%	79	0.48%	8	0.05%	24	0.15%	963	5.90%	500	3.07%
Jefferson		12,085	10,926	90.41%	15	0.12%	161	1.33%	49	0.41%	0	0.00%	43	0.36%	600	4.96%	291	2.41%
Judith Basin		2,023	1,883	93.08%	8	0.40%	1	0.05%	4	0.20%	2	0.10%	13	0.64%	63	3.11%	49	2.42%
Lake		31,134	20,373	65.44%	64	0.21%	6,632	21.30%	138	0.44%	21	0.07%	108	0.35%	2,630	8.45%	1,168	3.75%
Lewis and Clark		70,973	62,063	87.45%	266	0.37%	1,233	1.74%	551	0.78%	44	0.06%	287	0.40%	3,930	5.54%	2,599	3.66%
Liberty		1,959	1,856	94.74%	2	0.10%	10	0.51%	6	0.31%	0	0.00%	6	0.31%	66	3.37%	13	0.66%
Lincoln		19,677	17,725	90.08%	32	0.16%	204	1.04%	100	0.51%	13	0.07%	86	0.44%	956	4.86%	561	2.85%
McCone		1,729	1,592	92.08%	1	0.06%	23	1.33%	8	0.46%	2	0.12%	10	0.58%	61	3.53%	32	1.85%
Madison		8,623	7,955	92.25%	11	0.13%	34	0.39%	30	0.35%	6	0.07%	40	0.46%	308	3.57%	239	2.77%
Meagher		1,927	1,781	92.42%	12	0.62%	4	0.21%	2	0.10%	0	0.00%	8	0.42%	74	3.84%	46	2.39%
Mineral		4,535	4,044	89.17%	10	0.22%	63	1.39%	21	0.46%	5	0.11%	18	0.40%	227	5.01%	147	3.24%
Missoula		117,922	99,953	84.76%	706	0.60%	3,009	2.55%	1,423	1.21%	122	0.10%	509	0.43%	6,196	5.25%	6,004	5.09%
Musselshell		4,730	4,274	90.36%	4	0.08%	87	1.84%	22	0.47%	5	0.11%	12	0.25%	180	3.81%	146	3.09%
Park		17,191	15,636	90.95%	62	0.36%	142	0.83%	75	0.44%	0	0.00%	51	0.30%	715	4.16%	510	2.97%
Petroleum		496	466	93.95%	0	0.00%	0	0.00%	0	0.00%	0	0.00%	0	0.00%	25	5.04%	5	1.01%
Phillips		4,217	3,492	82.81%	5	0.12%	329	7.80%	15	0.36%	0	0.00%	26	0.62%	238	5.64%	112	2.66%
Pondera		5,898	4,644	78.74%	4	0.07%	891	15.11%	25	0.42%	11	0.19%	10	0.17%	216	3.66%	97	1.64%
Powder River		1,694	1,529	90.26%	5	0.30%	31	1.83%	0	0.00%	0	0.00%	10	0.59%	84	4.96%	35	2.07%
Powell		6,946	6,016	86.61%	64	0.92%	402	5.79%	23	0.33%	3	0.04%	17	0.24%	260	3.74%	161	2.32%
Prairie		1,088	982	90.26%	2	0.18%	13	1.19%	7	0.64%	0	0.00%	0	0.00%	51	4.69%	33	3.03%
Ravalli		44,174	39,695	89.86%	88	0.20%	323	0.73%	241	0.55%	29	0.07%	335	0.76%	1,879	4.25%	1,584	3.59%
Richland		11,491	9,892	86.08%	61	0.53%	165	1.44%	121	1.05%	5	0.04%	46	0.40%	596	5.19%	605	5.27%
Roosevelt		10,794	3,587	33.23%	32	0.30%	6,150	56.98%	47	0.44%	0	0.00%	22	0.20%	717	6.64%	239	2.21%
Rosebud		8,329	4,768	57.25%	20	0.24%	2,908	34.91%	32	0.38%	2	0.02%	28	0.34%	337	4.05%	234	2.81%
Sanders		12,400	10,732	86.55%	23	0.19%	441	3.56%	56	0.45%	3	0.02%	76	0.61%	723	5.83%	346	2.79%
Sheridan		3,539	3,170	89.57%	14	0.40%	61	1.72%	13	0.37%	0	0.00%	3	0.08%	171	4.83%	107	3.02%
Silver Bow		35,133	31,081	88.47%	126	0.36%	480	1.37%	214	0.61%	20	0.06%	134	0.38%	1,440	4.10%	1,638	4.66%
Stillwater		8,963	8,110	90.48%	13	0.15%	85	0.95%	22	0.25%	0	0.00%	33	0.37%	431	4.81%	269	3.00%
Sweet Grass		3,678	3,332	90.59%	8	0.22%	24	0.65%	15	0.41%	3	0.08%	8	0.22%	190	5.17%	98	2.66%
Teton		6,226	5,655	90.83%	19	0.31%	101	1.62%	15	0.24%	6	0.10%	38	0.61%	307	4.93%	85	1.37%
Toole		4,971	4,179	84.07%	32	0.64%	338	6.80%	36	0.72%	0	0.00%	20	0.40%	188	3.78%	178	3.58%
Treasure		762	688	90.29%	1	0.13%	15	1.97%	3	0.39%	1	0.13%	0	0.00%	23	3.02%	31	4.07%
Valley		7,578	6,353	83.83%	15	0.20%	674	8.89%	19	0.25%	0	0.00%	29	0.38%	314	4.14%	174	2.30%
Wheatland		2,069	1,850	89.42%	3	0.14%	11	0.53%	3	0.14%	0	0.00%	7	0.34%	127	6.14%	68	3.29%
Wibaux		937	859	91.68%	2	0.21%	5	0.53%	2	0.21%	2	0.21%	5	0.53%	35	3.74%	27	2.88%
Yellowstone		164,731	136,514	82.87%	1,187	0.72%	6,546	3.97%	1,279	0.78%	211	0.13%	576	0.35%	8,303	5.04%	10,115	6.14%

=== Previous counties ===
- St. Charles County, Missouri Territory created October 1, 1812, moved 1813
- Vancouver County, Oregon Territory created August 13, 1848, renamed Clarke County, Oregon Territory September 3, 1849
- Clarke County, Washington Territory created March 2, 1853
- Walla Walla County, Washington Territory April 25, 1854
- Spokane County, Washington Territory created January 29, 1858, abolished January 19, 1864
- Missoula County, Washington Territory created December 14, 1860, abolished May 26, 1864
- Shoshone County, Washington Territory created January 9, 1861, abolished March 3, 1863
- Stevens County, Washington Territory created January 20, 1863
- Shoshone County, Idaho Territory created February 4, 1864

=== Extinct counties ===
- Edgerton County, Montana Territory created February 2, 1865, renamed Lewis and Clark County, Montana Territory March 1, 1868.
- Big Horn County, Montana Territory created February 2, 1865, renamed Custer County, Montana Territory February 16, 1877.

=== County equivalents ===
- Yellowstone National Park (Montana Territory) created March 1, 1872, divided between Park County, Montana and Gallatin County, Montana in 1978.

== See also ==
- History of Montana
  - Bibliography of Montana history
  - Territorial evolution of Montana
  - Timeline of Montana history
- List of cities and towns in Montana
- List of ghost towns in Montana
- List of places in Montana
