= List of mountains in Carbon County, Montana =

There are at least 60 named mountains in Carbon County, Montana.

- Bald Knob, 45°04′48″N 109°47′21″W, el. 10,121 feet (3,085 m)
- Bar Hill, 45°02′50″N 108°15′13″W, el. 4,278 feet (1,304 m)
- Bare Mountain, 45°11′45″N 109°28′49″W, el. 9,898 feet (3,017 m)
- Barrys Island, 45°06′13″N 108°11′44″W, el. 3,917 feet (1,194 m)
- Beartooth Mountain, 45°03′39″N 109°34′07″W, el. 12,346 feet (3,763 m)
- Big Pryor Mountain, 45°09′38″N 108°28′10″W, el. 8,779 feet (2,676 m)
- Black Butte, 45°11′23″N 108°44′35″W, el. 5,148 feet (1,569 m)
- Black Butte, 45°16′02″N 109°35′25″W, el. 8,277 feet (2,523 m)
- Black Pyramid Mountain, 45°04′19″N 109°24′01″W, el. 8,560 feet (2,610 m)
- Blanchard Butte, 45°25′33″N 109°05′15″W, el. 4,363 feet (1,330 m)
- Bowback Mountain, 45°07′40″N 109°37′06″W, el. 12,290 feet (3,750 m)
- Burnt Mountain, 45°12′59″N 109°26′48″W, el. 7,851 feet (2,393 m)
- Butcher Mountain, 45°12′33″N 109°33′04″W, el. 10,164 feet (3,098 m)
- Castle Mountain, 45°05′56″N 109°37′50″W, el. 12,605 feet (3,842 m)
- Castle Rock Mountain, 45°05′54″N 109°39′14″W, el. 12,418 feet (3,785 m)
- Church Hill, 45°22′36″N 109°11′12″W, el. 4,767 feet (1,453 m)
- Crazy Mountain, 45°02′21″N 109°42′47″W, el. 10,108 feet (3,081 m)
- Crow Mountain, 45°12′37″N 109°35′35″W, el. 9,695 feet (2,955 m)
- Deer Mountain, 45°11′18″N 108°56′04″W, el. 4,419 feet (1,347 m)
- East Pryor Mountain, 45°10′06″N 108°20′06″W, el. 8,773 feet (2,674 m)
- Elk Mountain, 45°08′17″N 109°36′34″W, el. 12,228 feet (3,727 m)
- Grass Mountain, 45°10′05″N 109°33′08″W, el. 11,043 feet (3,366 m)
- Grizzly Peak, 45°10′43″N 109°21′26″W, el. 9,354 feet (2,851 m)
- Harris Hill, 45°32′46″N 108°55′25″W, el. 4,071 feet (1,241 m)
- Lonesome Mountain, 45°01′00″N 109°35′49″W, el. 11,329 feet (3,453 m)
- Maurice Mount, 45°05′59″N 109°15′29″W, el. 9,255 feet (2,821 m)
- Medicine Mountain, 45°05′20″N 109°36′44″W, el. 11,522 feet (3,512 m)
- Metcalf Mountain, 45°01′40″N 109°32′35″W, el. 11,378 feet (3,468 m)
- Mount Dewey, 45°05′33″N 109°45′17″W, el. 11,411 feet (3,478 m)
- Mount Inabnit, 45°07′47″N 109°37′54″W, el. 11,854 feet (3,613 m)
- Mount Lockhart, 45°05′49″N 109°34′29″W, el. 11,598 feet (3,535 m)
- Mount Peal, 45°09′39″N 109°46′22″W, el. 12,395 feet (3,778 m)
- Mount Rearguard, 45°02′54″N 109°31′35″W, el. 12,155 feet (3,705 m)
- Mount Rosebud, 45°05′19″N 109°46′03″W, el. 11,184 feet (3,409 m)
- Nichols Peak, 45°11′03″N 109°22′16″W, el. 9,380 feet (2,860 m)
- Penney Peak, 45°02′27″N 108°23′59″W, el. 5,039 feet (1,536 m)
- Pika Peak, 45°08′02″N 109°46′33″W, el. 10,938 feet (3,334 m)
- Red Pryor Mountain, 45°07′05″N 108°27′12″W, el. 8,448 feet (2,575 m)
- Rock Island Butte, 45°00′16″N 109°47′41″W, el. 8,878 feet (2,706 m)
- Round Butte, 45°20′15″N 108°52′57″W, el. 3,875 feet (1,181 m)
- Schwend Hill, 45°14′20″N 108°55′06″W, el. 4,032 feet (1,229 m)
- Sheep Mountain, 45°15′17″N 109°26′11″W, el. 6,165 feet (1,879 m)
- Shepard Mountain, 45°10′41″N 109°41′22″W, el. 10,955 feet (3,339 m)
- Silver Run Peak, 45°07′16″N 109°32′43″W, el. 12,477 feet (3,803 m)
- Snowbank Mountain, 45°05′52″N 109°41′42″W, el. 12,011 feet (3,661 m)
- Spirit Mountain, 45°02′25″N 109°33′04″W, el. 12,290 feet (3,750 m)
- Stormitt Butte, 45°25′33″N 109°04′27″W, el. 4,459 feet (1,359 m)
- Summit Mountain, 45°05′34″N 109°43′21″W, el. 11,519 feet (3,511 m)
- Sundance Mountain, 45°06′23″N 109°36′34″W, el. 12,231 feet (3,728 m)
- Sylvan Peak, 45°09′51″N 109°36′17″W, el. 11,936 feet (3,638 m)
- Tempest Mountain, 45°10′01″N 109°47′31″W, el. 12,438 feet (3,791 m)
- The Big Slide, 45°16′20″N 109°05′32″W, el. 5,102 feet (1,555 m)
- Three Sisters, 45°13′35″N 109°38′07″W, el. 8,205 feet (2,501 m)
- Thunder Mountain, 45°04′23″N 109°32′54″W, el. 11,401 feet (3,475 m)
- Tolman Mountain, 45°03′52″N 109°22′15″W, el. 9,849 feet (3,002 m)
- Tolman Point, 45°05′17″N 109°23′33″W, el. 8,540 feet (2,600 m)
- Wapiti Mountain, 45°06′25″N 109°20′52″W, el. 9,409 feet (2,868 m)
- Whitetail Peak, 45°05′20″N 109°35′16″W, el. 12,536 feet (3,821 m)
- Yellow Hill, 45°01′41″N 108°15′53″W, el. 4,403 feet (1,342 m)
- Youngs Point, 45°35′59″N 108°59′49″W, el. 4,085 feet (1,245 m)

== See also ==
- List of mountains in Montana
- List of mountain ranges in Montana
