= Lonesome Mountain =

Mountain in Montana, United States

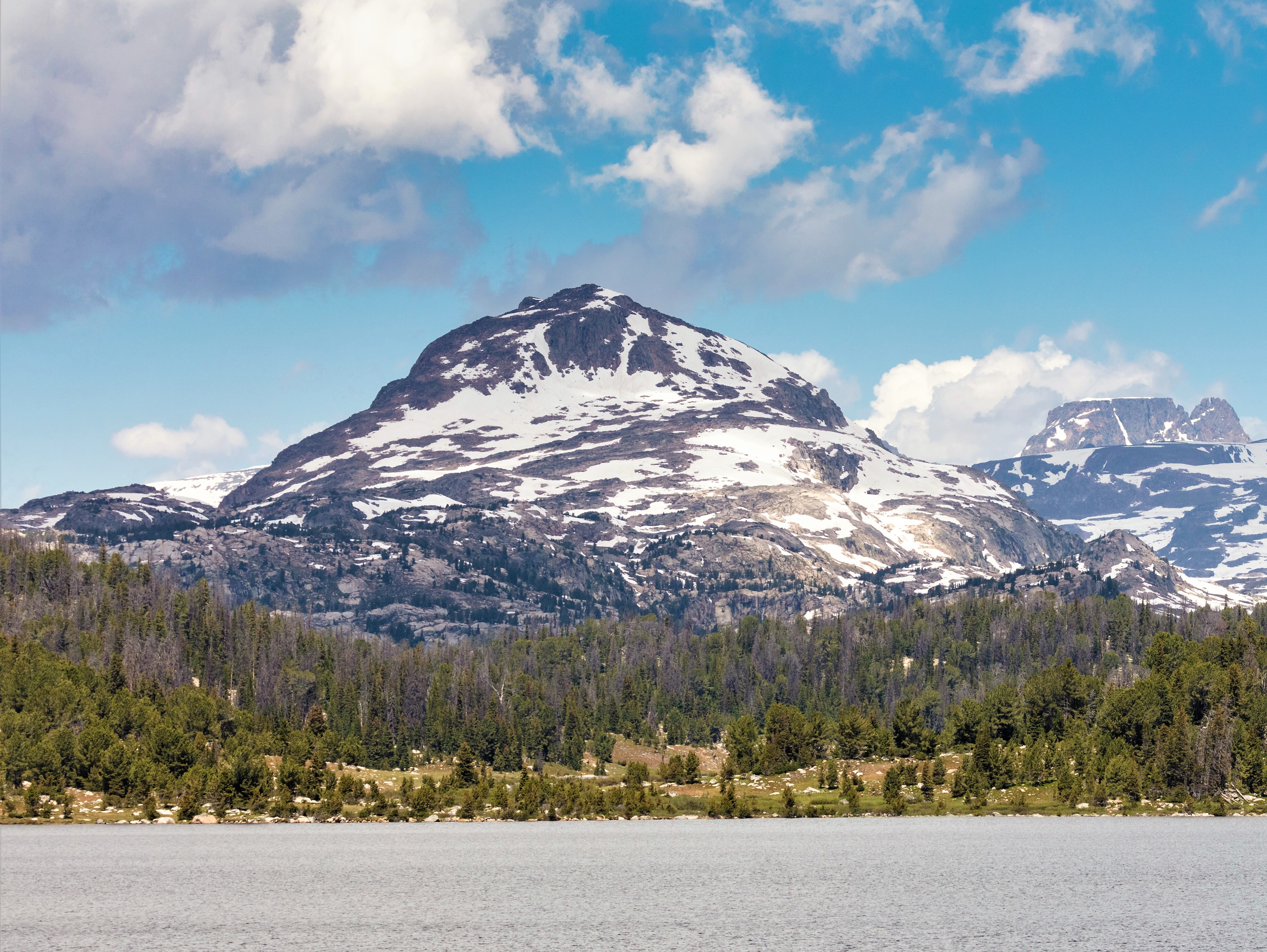
- South aspect

Highest point
- Elevation: 11,399 ft (3,474 m)
- Prominence: 1,039 ft (317 m)
- Parent peak: Spirit Mountain (12,283 ft)
- Isolation: 2.43 mi (3.91 km)
- Coordinates: 45°00′51″N 109°35′43″W

Geography
- Location within Montana Location within the United States
- Location: Carbon County, Montana, U.S.
- Parent range: Rocky Mountains; Absaroka Range; Beartooth Mountains
- Topo map: USGS Silver Run Peak

Climbing
- Easiest route: class 3 scrambling

Lonesome Mountain is an 11,399-foot (3,474-metre) mountain summit located in Carbon County, Montana.

== Description ==
Lonesome Mountain is located in the Beartooth Mountains, which are a subset of the Rocky Mountains. It is situated 4.2 miles north of Beartooth Butte in the Absaroka-Beartooth Wilderness, on land managed by Gallatin National Forest. The highest point in Montana, Granite Peak, rises 14.3 miles to the northwest. Precipitation runoff from the mountain drains into several surrounding alpine lakes which feed tributaries of the Clarks Fork Yellowstone River. Topographic relief is significant as the summit rises 1,400 feet (430 meters) above these lakes in less than one mile. This geographical feature's name has been officially adopted by the United States Board on Geographic Names.

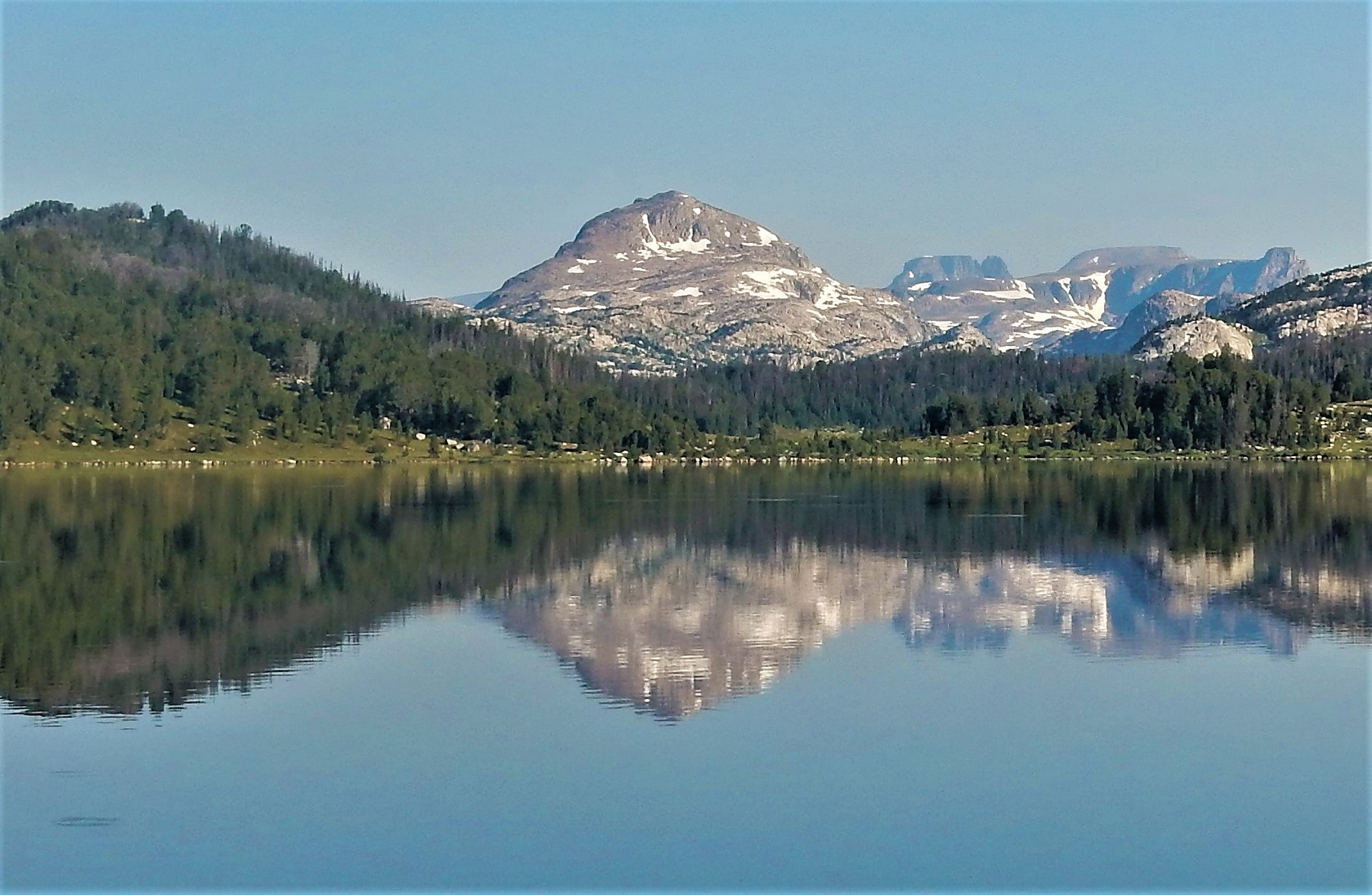
Lonesome Mountain from Island Lake

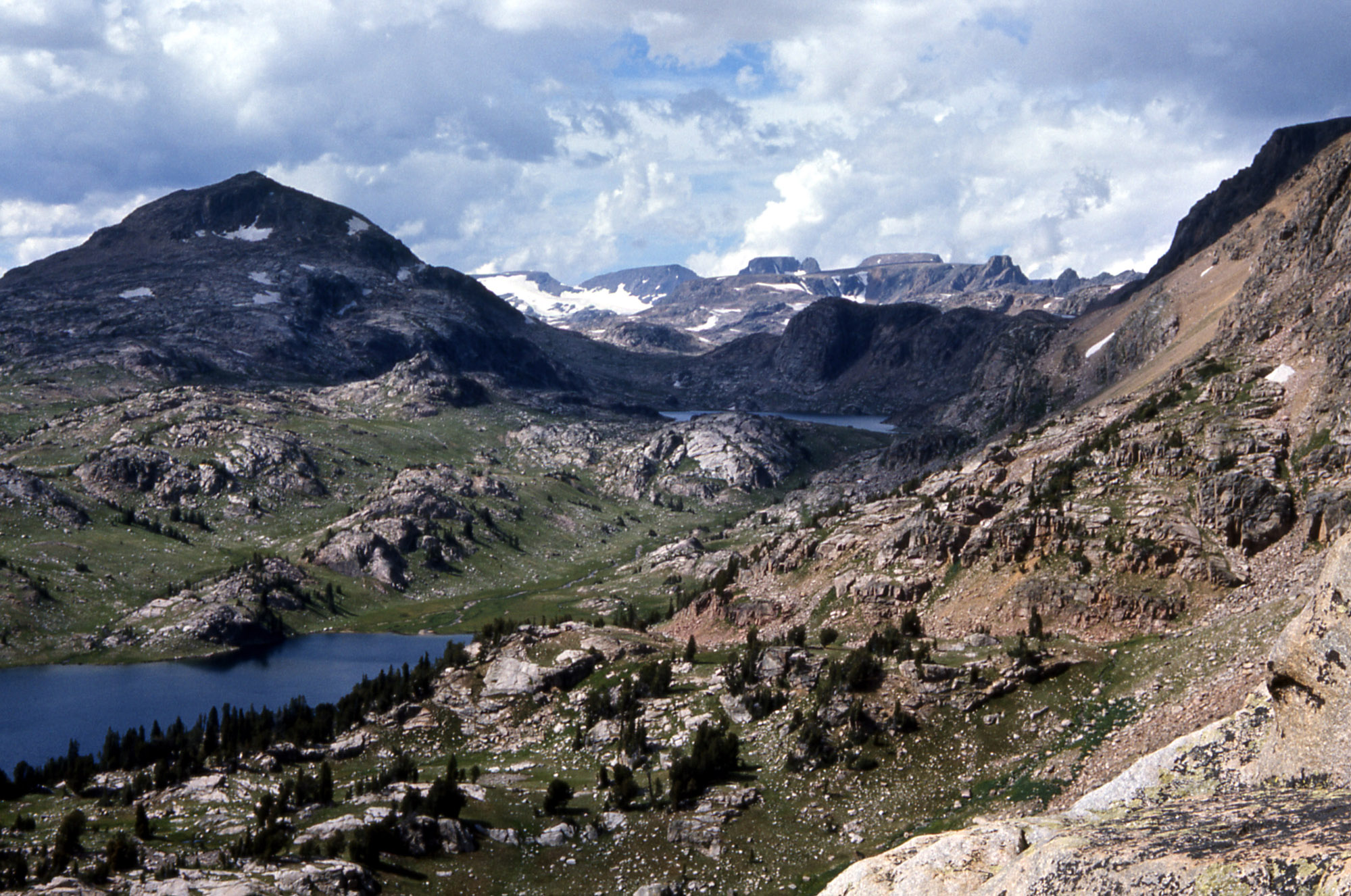
Lonesome Mountain as seen from the southeast. Becker Lake (Wyoming) in the bottom left. Albino Lake (Montana) in the back.

== Climate ==
Based on the Köppen climate classification, Lonesome Mountain is located in a subarctic climate zone characterized by long, usually very cold winters, and mild summers. Winter temperatures can drop below −10 °F with wind chill factors below −30 °F.

== See also ==
- Geology of the Rocky Mountains
