= Castle Rock Spire =

Mountain spire in the state of Montana

- Location within Montana Location within the United States

Highest point
- Elevation: 12,545 ft (3,824 m)
- Prominence: 420 ft (130 m)
- Coordinates: 45°05′50″N 109°38′35″W

Geography
- Location: Carbon County, Montana, U.S.
- Parent range: Beartooth Mountains
- Topo map: USGS Castle Mountain

Castle Rock Spire (12,545 feet (3,824 m)) is in the Beartooth Mountains in the U.S. state of Montana. The peak is one of the tallest in the Beartooth Mountains, the seventh tallest in Montana and in the Absaroka-Beartooth Wilderness of Custer and Gallatin National Forests. Castle Rock Spire is only .50 mi (0.80 km) WSW of Castle Mountain. The Sundance Glacier lies on the north slopes of the peak.
