= Granite Peak-Northwest Peak =

Mountain in Montana, United States

- Location within Montana Location within the United States

Highest point
- Elevation: 12,750 ft (3,890 m)
- Prominence: 305 ft (93 m)
- Coordinates: 45°10′00″N 109°48′48″W

Geography
- Location: Park County, Montana, U.S.
- Parent range: Beartooth Mountains

Granite Peak-Northwest Peak (12,750 feet (3,890 m)) is in the Beartooth Mountains in the U.S. state of Montana. Granite Peak-Northwest Peak is also known as Peak 12745, and is only .4 mi (0.64 km) northwest of Granite Peak, the tallest mountain in Montana. With just over 300 ft (91 m) of topographic prominence, Granite Peak-Northwest Peak may be considered a distinct peak from Granite Peak, or merely a lower subpeak due to being part of the same massif. If considered a distinct peak, it is the second tallest mountain in Montana. Granite Peak-Northwest Peak is in the Absaroka-Beartooth Wilderness on the border of Custer and Gallatin National Forests.
