= Salo Mountain =

Mountain in Montana, United States

- Location within Montana Location within the United States

Highest point
- Elevation: 12,255 ft (3,735 m)
- Prominence: 370 ft (110 m)
- Coordinates: 45°05′46″N 109°40′03″W

Geography
- Location: Carbon County, Montana, U.S.
- Parent range: Beartooth Mountains
- Topo map: USGS Castle Peak

Salo Mountain (12,255 feet (3,735 m)) is in the Beartooth Mountains in the U.S. state of Montana. The peak is one of the tallest in the Beartooth Mountains and is in the Absaroka-Beartooth Wilderness in Custer National Forest. The peak is unofficially named and lies immediately northwest of Castle Rock Glacier.
