= Castle Rock Mountain =

Mountain in Montana, United States

- Location within Montana Location within the United States

Highest point
- Elevation: 12,406 ft (3,781 m)
- Prominence: 481 ft (147 m)
- Coordinates: 45°05′54″N 109°39′14″W

Geography
- Location: Carbon County, Montana, U.S.
- Parent range: Beartooth Mountains
- Topo map: USGS Castle Mountain

Castle Rock Mountain (12,406 feet (3,781 m)) is in the Beartooth Mountains in the U.S. state of Montana. The peak is one of the tallest in the Beartooth Mountains, the tenth-tallest in Montana and is in the Absaroka-Beartooth Wilderness, on the border of Custer and Gallatin national forests. The nearest taller mountain to Castle Rock Mountain is Castle Rock Spire, 0.65 mi (1.05 km) east. Castle Rock Mountain is flanked by the Sundance Glacier to the north and the Castle Rock Glacier to the south.
