= List of mountains in Stillwater County, Montana =

There are at least 46 named mountains in Stillwater County, Montana.

- Antelope Point, 45°47′53″N 109°06′21″W, el. 4,564 feet (1,391 m)
- Antelope Point, 45°48′58″N 109°27′58″W, el. 4,587 feet (1,398 m)
- Arch Rock, 45°32′44″N 109°53′47″W, el. 7,247 feet (2,209 m)
- Battle Butte, 45°52′42″N 109°11′44″W, el. 4,377 feet (1,334 m)
- Beehive Rock, 45°29′33″N 109°43′07″W, el. 5,390 feet (1,640 m)
- Big Mountain, 45°10′41″N 109°54′10″W, el. 11,358 feet (3,462 m)
- Black Butte, 45°21′40″N 109°46′46″W, el. 8,464 feet (2,580 m)
- Busteed Hill, 45°51′59″N 109°18′07″W, el. 4,524 feet (1,379 m)
- Cathedral Peak, 45°19′56″N 109°59′12″W, el. 10,548 feet (3,215 m)
- Cow Face Hill, 45°35′46″N 109°39′59″W, el. 5,308 feet (1,618 m)
- Fishtail Butte, 45°24′05″N 109°42′12″W, el. 5,741 feet (1,750 m)
- Froze-to-Death Mountain, 45°11′25″N 109°45′34″W, el. 11,755 feet (3,583 m)
- Hodges Mountain, 45°10′29″N 109°56′24″W, el. 10,846 feet (3,306 m)
- Horse Butte, 45°40′22″N 109°05′52″W, el. 4,295 feet (1,309 m)
- Hugh Henry Hill, 45°53′44″N 109°21′15″W, el. 4,373 feet (1,333 m)
- Huntley Butte, 45°35′30″N 109°24′51″W, el. 4,606 feet (1,404 m)
- Jones Hill, 45°55′05″N 109°22′19″W, el. 4,377 feet (1,334 m)
- Limestone Butte, 45°28′24″N 109°53′04″W, el. 7,493 feet (2,284 m)
- Lindemulder Hill, 45°50′16″N 109°15′55″W, el. 4,685 feet (1,428 m)
- Little Park Mountain, 45°11′52″N 109°55′02″W, el. 11,480 feet (3,500 m)
- Locomotive Butte, 46°07′48″N 109°19′32″W, el. 4,472 feet (1,363 m)
- Love Hill, 45°52′38″N 109°15′17″W, el. 4,304 feet (1,312 m)
- Madison Grade, 45°30′59″N 109°36′27″W, el. 4,429 feet (1,350 m)
- Miller Butte, 45°40′41″N 108°57′04″W, el. 3,996 feet (1,218 m)
- Monument Butte, 45°43′48″N 109°31′01″W, el. 4,026 feet (1,227 m)
- Mosquito Peak, 45°12′10″N 110°01′03″W, el. 10,367 feet (3,160 m)
- Mount Hague, 45°15′40″N 109°50′14″W, el. 12,303 feet (3,750 m)
- Mount Hole-in-the-Wall, 45°10′54″N 109°43′17″W, el. 11,450 feet (3,490 m)
- Mount Wood, 45°16′31″N 109°48′48″W, el. 12,592 feet (3,838 m)
- Mud Butte, 45°32′30″N 109°44′05″W, el. 5,561 feet (1,695 m)
- Nellies Twin Buttes, 45°23′36″N 109°37′30″W, el. 5,942 feet (1,811 m)
- Pershing Hill, 45°45′30″N 109°16′14″W, el. 4,383 feet (1,336 m)
- Pershing Hill, 45°44′45″N 109°15′39″W, el. 4,288 feet (1,307 m)
- Prairieview Mountain, 45°13′30″N 109°42′46″W, el. 10,574 feet (3,223 m)
- Pyramid Mountain, 45°17′00″N 109°45′16″W, el. 10,108 feet (3,081 m)
- Saddleback Mountain, 45°13′29″N 109°41′57″W, el. 10,873 feet (3,314 m)
- Square Butte, 45°39′47″N 108°53′28″W, el. 3,773 feet (1,150 m)
- Storm Mountain, 45°13′16″N 109°55′48″W, el. 10,659 feet (3,249 m)
- Tumble Mountain, 45°19′22″N 110°01′32″W, el. 11,270 feet (3,440 m)
- Twin Buttes, 45°55′29″N 109°14′40″W, el. 4,176 feet (1,273 m)
- Twin Peaks, 45°15′05″N 109°53′22″W, el. 11,676 feet (3,559 m)
- Two Sisters, 45°15′50″N 110°01′25″W, el. 11,135 feet (3,394 m)
- Warner Hill, 45°44′36″N 109°26′23″W, el. 4,587 feet (1,398 m)
- Wash Bowl Butte, 45°34′15″N 109°13′38″W, el. 4,468 feet (1,362 m)
- Wildcat Mountain, 45°11′25″N 110°01′53″W, el. 10,243 feet (3,122 m)
- Yancey Hill, 45°25′19″N 109°27′15″W, el. 4,816 feet (1,468 m)

== See also ==
- List of mountains in Montana
- List of mountain ranges in Montana
