= Mount Peal =

Mountain in the state of Montana

- Location within Montana Location within the United States

Highest point
- Elevation: 12,414 ft (3,784 m)
- Prominence: 489 ft (149 m)
- Coordinates: 45°09′39″N 109°46′22″W

Geography
- Location: Carbon County, Montana, U.S.
- Parent range: Beartooth Mountains
- Topo map: USGS Granite Peak

Mount Peal (12,414 feet (3,784 m)) is in the Beartooth Mountains in the U.S. state of Montana. The peak is one of the tallest in the Beatooth Mountains, the ninth tallest in Montana and is in the Absaroka-Beartooth Wilderness of Custer National Forest. The nearest taller mountain to Mount Peal is Tempest Mountain, 1 mi (1.6 km) WNW.
