= Spirit Mountain =

Spirit Mountain may refer to the following places:

- Spirit Mountain (Montana), U.S.
- Spirit Mountain (Nevada), U.S.
  - Spirit Mountain Wilderness
- Spirit Mountain (ski area), in Duluth, Minnesota, U.S.

== See also ==
- Spirit Mountain Casino (disambiguation)
