= Snowbank Glacier =

Glacier in the U.S. state of Montana

- Location within Montana
- Type: Mountain glacier
- Location: Beartooth Mountains, Carbon County, Montana, United States
- Coordinates: 45°05′38″N 109°41′02″W
- Area: Approximately 120 acres (0.49 km^{2}) for both lobes
- Length: .45 mi (0.72 km)
- Terminus: Talus
- Status: Unknown

Snowbank Glacier is in the Beartooth Mountains, in the U.S. state of Montana. The glacier is situated at an elevation of 10,600 feet (3,200 m) above sea level and is immediately east of Snowbank Mountain. The glacier is in two sections, a west and east lobe, each about equal in area at 60 acres (0.24 km^{2}). A proglacial lake can be found at the northern terminus of the west lobe.

== See also ==
- List of glaciers in the United States
