= List of mountains in Jefferson County, Montana =

There are at least 65 named mountains in Jefferson County, Montana.

- Alta Mountain, 46°22′12″N 112°06′08″W, el. 6,253 feet (1,906 m)
- Bald Mountain, 45°52′35″N 112°20′02″W, el. 6,601 feet (2,012 m)
- Bear Mountain, 46°13′21″N 112°19′47″W, el. 7,172 feet (2,186 m)
- Big Mountain, 46°01′00″N 111°48′24″W, el. 6,069 feet (1,850 m)
- Black Butte, 45°56′47″N 112°04′10″W, el. 5,663 feet (1,726 m)
- Black Sheep Mountain, 45°57′43″N 112°20′57″W, el. 6,883 feet (2,098 m)
- Blueball Mountain, 46°24′27″N 112°03′01″W, el. 5,709 feet (1,740 m)
- Bonan Hill, 46°13′08″N 112°04′08″W, el. 5,436 feet (1,657 m)
- Bullock Hill, 46°21′10″N 111°53′19″W, el. 7,917 feet (2,413 m)
- Burnt Mountain, 46°26′54″N 111°55′10″W, el. 6,017 feet (1,834 m)
- Capital Hill, 46°14′27″N 112°06′47″W, el. 5,085 feet (1,550 m)
- Casey Peak, 46°25′45″N 111°49′11″W, el. 8,491 feet (2,588 m)
- Cave Mountain, 45°50′15″N 111°52′46″W, el. 5,902 feet (1,799 m)
- Corral Mountain, 46°29′45″N 111°48′33″W, el. 6,896 feet (2,102 m)
- Crow Peak, 46°17′38″N 111°54′15″W, el. 9,386 feet (2,861 m)
- Doherty Mountain, 45°53′29″N 111°53′55″W, el. 5,269 feet (1,606 m)
- Dolomite Knob, 45°50′10″N 111°51′58″W, el. 5,564 feet (1,696 m)
- Dry Mountain, 45°57′51″N 112°12′44″W, el. 6,965 feet (2,123 m)
- Dunn Peak, 46°02′30″N 112°00′25″W, el. 7,510 feet (2,290 m)
- Emerson Peak, 46°24′11″N 112°00′13″W, el. 5,243 feet (1,598 m)
- Fletcher Mountain, 46°05′02″N 112°06′54″W, el. 5,682 feet (1,732 m)
- Fox Mountain, 46°17′38″N 112°21′44″W, el. 7,428 feet (2,264 m)
- Goldflint Mountain, 45°57′38″N 112°22′56″W, el. 7,841 feet (2,390 m)
- Goodwin Mountain, 46°00′31″N 112°10′58″W, el. 6,939 feet (2,115 m)
- Gregory Mountain, 46°23′16″N 112°06′25″W, el. 6,161 feet (1,878 m)
- Haystack Mountain, 46°08′29″N 112°19′35″W, el. 8,799 feet (2,682 m)
- High Peak, 46°24′46″N 111°50′08″W, el. 8,481 feet (2,585 m)
- Iron Mountain, 46°18′03″N 112°23′15″W, el. 7,618 feet (2,322 m)
- Jack Mountain, 46°20′18″N 112°17′33″W, el. 8,727 feet (2,660 m)
- Jack Mountain, 46°31′14″N 112°01′41″W, el. 6,171 feet (1,881 m)
- Lava Mountain, 46°25′00″N 112°11′49″W, el. 7,543 feet (2,299 m)
- Lava Mountain, 46°25′31″N 111°53′52″W, el. 6,483 feet (1,976 m)
- Legget Hill, 45°57′05″N 112°21′15″W, el. 6,880 feet (2,100 m)
- Little Butte, 46°30′38″N 111°51′10″W, el. 5,364 feet (1,635 m)
- McClusky Mountain, 45°59′38″N 112°16′34″W, el. 8,140 feet (2,480 m)
- Mount Pisgah, 46°10′38″N 112°15′06″W, el. 8,045 feet (2,452 m)
- Mount Thompson, 46°19′23″N 112°12′57″W, el. 7,923 feet (2,415 m)
- Pipestone Rock, 45°56′12″N 112°19′38″W, el. 6,079 feet (1,853 m)
- Pole Mountain, 46°16′55″N 112°18′08″W, el. 7,582 feet (2,311 m)
- Pulpit Rock, 46°14′12″N 112°08′31″W, el. 5,157 feet (1,572 m)
- Rampart Mountain, 46°03′20″N 112°28′22″W, el. 7,753 feet (2,363 m)
- Ratio Mountain, 46°01′23″N 112°10′40″W, el. 7,175 feet (2,187 m)
- Red Hill, 45°54′45″N 111°57′28″W, el. 5,105 feet (1,556 m)
- Ringing Rocks, 45°56′36″N 112°14′15″W, el. 5,682 feet (1,732 m)
- Rocker Peak, 46°21′13″N 112°15′17″W, el. 8,455 feet (2,577 m)
- Ryan Mountain, 46°12′14″N 112°00′21″W, el. 6,857 feet (2,090 m)
- Saturday Night Hill, 46°17′50″N 112°15′44″W, el. 6,844 feet (2,086 m)
- Sheep Mountain, 46°30′06″N 112°01′41″W, el. 5,942 feet (1,811 m)
- Sheepshead Mountain, 46°09′23″N 112°25′59″W, el. 7,769 feet (2,368 m)
- Shingle Butte, 46°29′37″N 111°55′08″W, el. 5,915 feet (1,803 m)
- Skihi Peak, 46°31′36″N 112°03′32″W, el. 6,532 feet (1,991 m)
- Spire Rock, 45°57′14″N 112°17′24″W, el. 6,001 feet (1,829 m)
- Spruce Hills, 46°28′35″N 112°09′31″W, el. 6,319 feet (1,926 m)
- Strawberry Butte, 46°28′33″N 111°54′58″W, el. 6,089 feet (1,856 m)
- Sugar-loaf Mountain, 46°17′01″N 112°10′08″W, el. 6,686 feet (2,038 m)
- Sullivan Mountain, 46°13′56″N 112°18′50″W, el. 7,293 feet (2,223 m)
- Three Brothers, 46°23′29″N 112°15′38″W, el. 8,543 feet (2,604 m)
- Thunderbolt Mountain, 46°19′46″N 112°27′13″W, el. 8,576 feet (2,614 m)
- Toll Mountain, 45°50′33″N 112°23′26″W, el. 7,349 feet (2,240 m)
- Valparaiso Mountain, 46°23′37″N 112°05′18″W, el. 6,230 feet (1,900 m)
- Whitetail Peak, 46°03′51″N 112°20′20″W, el. 8,353 feet (2,546 m)
- Windy Butte, 46°26′08″N 112°01′18″W, el. 5,485 feet (1,672 m)
- Windy Point, 46°18′22″N 111°55′45″W, el. 9,025 feet (2,751 m)
- Wolf Mountain, 46°26′10″N 112°02′52″W, el. 5,820 feet (1,770 m)

== See also ==
- List of mountains in Montana
- List of mountain ranges in Montana
