= Froze-to-Death Mountain =

Mountain in United States of America

- Location within Montana

Highest point
- Elevation: 11,755 ft (3,583 m)
- Prominence: 160 ft (49 m)
- Listing: List of mountains in Montana
- Coordinates: 45°11′25″N 109°45′34″W

Geography
- Location: Stillwater County, Montana, U.S.
- Parent range: Beartooth Mountains
- Topo map: USGS Stillwater County

Froze-to-Death Mountain is a prominent summit among the Beartooth Mountains. It stands in Stillwater County, Montana, United States.

== Geography ==
Froze-to-Death Mountain rises to an elevation of 11,755 feet (3,583 m) at its peak. It is the highest landform in the Froze-to-Death Plateau, a local name for an area within the Beartooth Mountains.

Surrounding features include Froze-to-Death Lake and Froze-to-Death Creek. The mountain area is part of the Custer National Forest which is itself a part of the Absaroka-Beartooth Wilderness. As national forest territory, it is administered by the United States Forest Service. The nearest city is Big Timber (pop. 1,650) in Sweet Grass County, Montana.

=== Pass to Granite Peak ===
While it is a challenging summit in itself, most climbers bypass it for the saddle between Froze-to-Death and its neighbor, Prairie View Mountain, to take one of two trailways that lead up to Granite Peak, the highest peak in Montana.

== Environment ==
The name "Froze-to-Death" is said to derive from the experiences of the local Crow tribe of Native Americans. The area can be deadly for unprepared visitors. Its rocky, broken terrain is difficult for travelers and snow is possible at any time of the year.

The imposing conditions of the mountain and the surrounding plateau preclude nearly all wildlife with the exception of a few nesting Golden Eagles and the occasional mountain goat. Stone cairns stand throughout the area in such numbers that their value as position locators is greatly limited, and the U.S. Forest Service (USFS) strongly recommends against using them for navigation. Even modern travellers frequently find themselves lost, and rescue is difficult. The USFS keeps no official records regarding the number of deaths in the area, but the risk of fatalities from accidents and exposure is recognized as high. For even the most experienced outdoor enthusiasts, Froze-to-Death Mountain and the other peaks of the Beartooth Mountain range rank among the most challenging and dangerous of all North American parkland.

== See also ==
- List of mountains in Stillwater County, Montana
- List of mountains in Montana
