= Tempest Mountain =

Mountain in the state of Montana

- Location within Montana Location within the United States

Highest point
- Elevation: 12,474 ft (3,802 m)
- Prominence: 909 ft (277 m)
- Coordinates: 45°10′01″N 109°47′31″W

Geography
- Location: Carbon County, Montana, U.S.
- Parent range: Beartooth Mountains
- Topo map: USGS Granite Peak

Climbing
- Easiest route: Scramble

Tempest Mountain (12,474 feet (3,802 m)) is in the Beartooth Mountains in the U.S. state of Montana. The peak is one of the tallest in the Beartooth Mountains, the eighth tallest in Montana and is in the Absaroka-Beartooth Wilderness of Custer National Forest. Tempest Mountain is less than 1 mi (1.6 km) ENE of Granite Peak, the tallest mountain in Montana.
