= Snowbank Mountain =

Snowbank Mountain refers to one of these mountain peaks:

- Snowbank Mountain (Idaho) - highest summit of the West Mountains
- Snowbank Mountain (Montana)
