= Pyramid Mountain (Montana) =

Mountain in the state of Montana

- Location within Montana Location within the United States

Highest point
- Elevation: 12,124 ft (3,695 m)
- Prominence: 319 ft (97 m)
- Coordinates: 45°17′00″N 109°45′16″W

Geography
- Location: Stillwater County, Montana, U.S.
- Parent range: Beartooth Mountains
- Topo map: USGS Mount Wood

Pyramid Mountain (12,124 feet (3,695 m)) is in the Beartooth Mountains in the U.S. state of Montana. The peak is in the Absaroka-Beartooth Wilderness in Custer National Forest.
