= Thunder Mountain (Carbon County, Montana) =

Mountain in Carbon County, Montana, United States

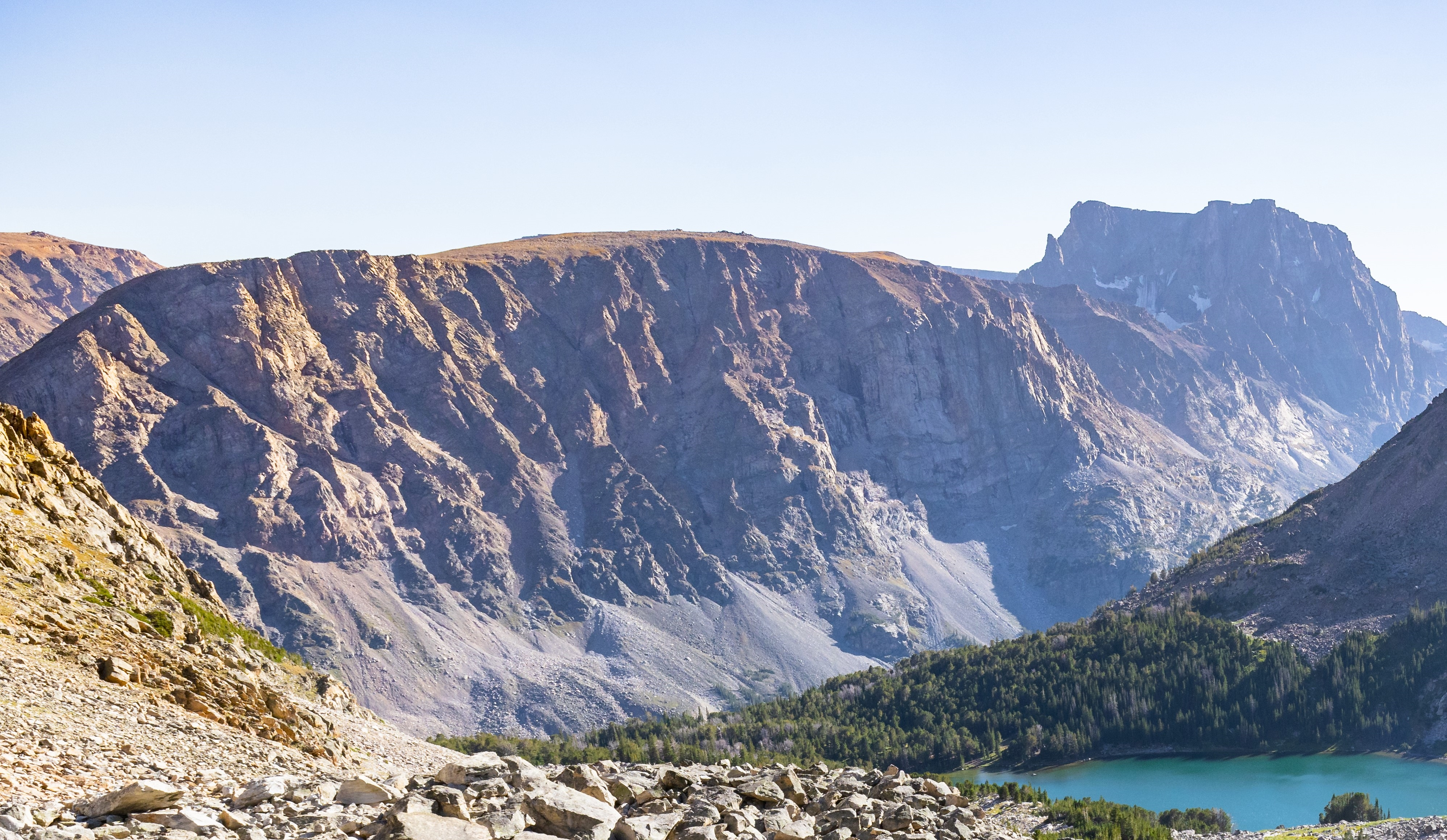
- North aspect, centered (Beartooth Mountain in upper right)

Highest point
- Elevation: 11,441 ft (3,487 m)
- Prominence: 515 ft (157 m)
- Parent peak: Beartooth Mountain
- Isolation: 1.15 mi (1.85 km)
- Coordinates: 45°04′24″N 109°32′53″W

Geography
- Location within Montana Location within the United States
- Country: United States
- State: Montana
- County: Carbon
- Protected area: Absaroka–Beartooth Wilderness
- Parent range: Beartooth Mountains; Rocky Mountains
- Topo map: USGS Silver Run Peak

Climbing
- Easiest route: class 2

Thunder Mountain is an 11,441-foot (3,487-metre) summit in Carbon County, Montana, United States.

== Description ==
The mountain is located 17 miles (27 km) southwest of Red Lodge, in the Beartooth Mountains which are a subrange of the Rocky Mountains. It is set within the Absaroka–Beartooth Wilderness on land managed by Custer-Gallatin National Forest. The mountain ranks as the 52nd-highest peak in Montana. Precipitation runoff from the mountain's slopes drains into Lake Fork → Rock Creek → Clarks Fork Yellowstone River → Yellowstone River. Topographic relief is significant as the summit rises 2,600 feet (792 meters) above Lake Fork in 0.75 miles (1.21 km). The mountain's toponym has been officially adopted by the United States Board on Geographic Names.

== Climate ==
Based on the Köppen climate classification, Thunder Mountain is located in a subarctic climate zone characterized by long, usually very cold winters, and mild summers. Winter temperatures can drop below 0 °F with wind chill factors below −10 °F.

== Gallery ==
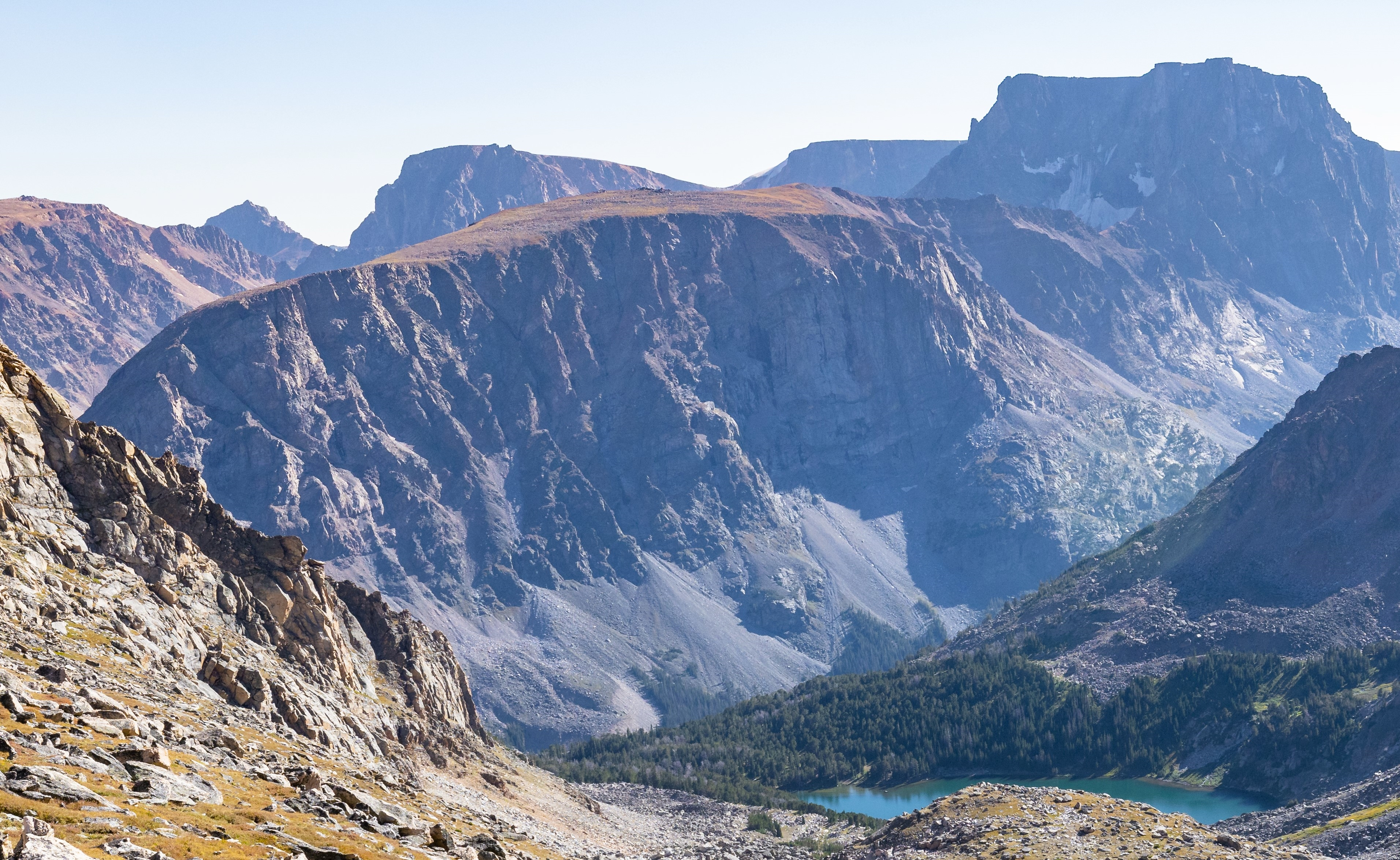
North aspect, centered
(Beartooth Mountain in upper right)

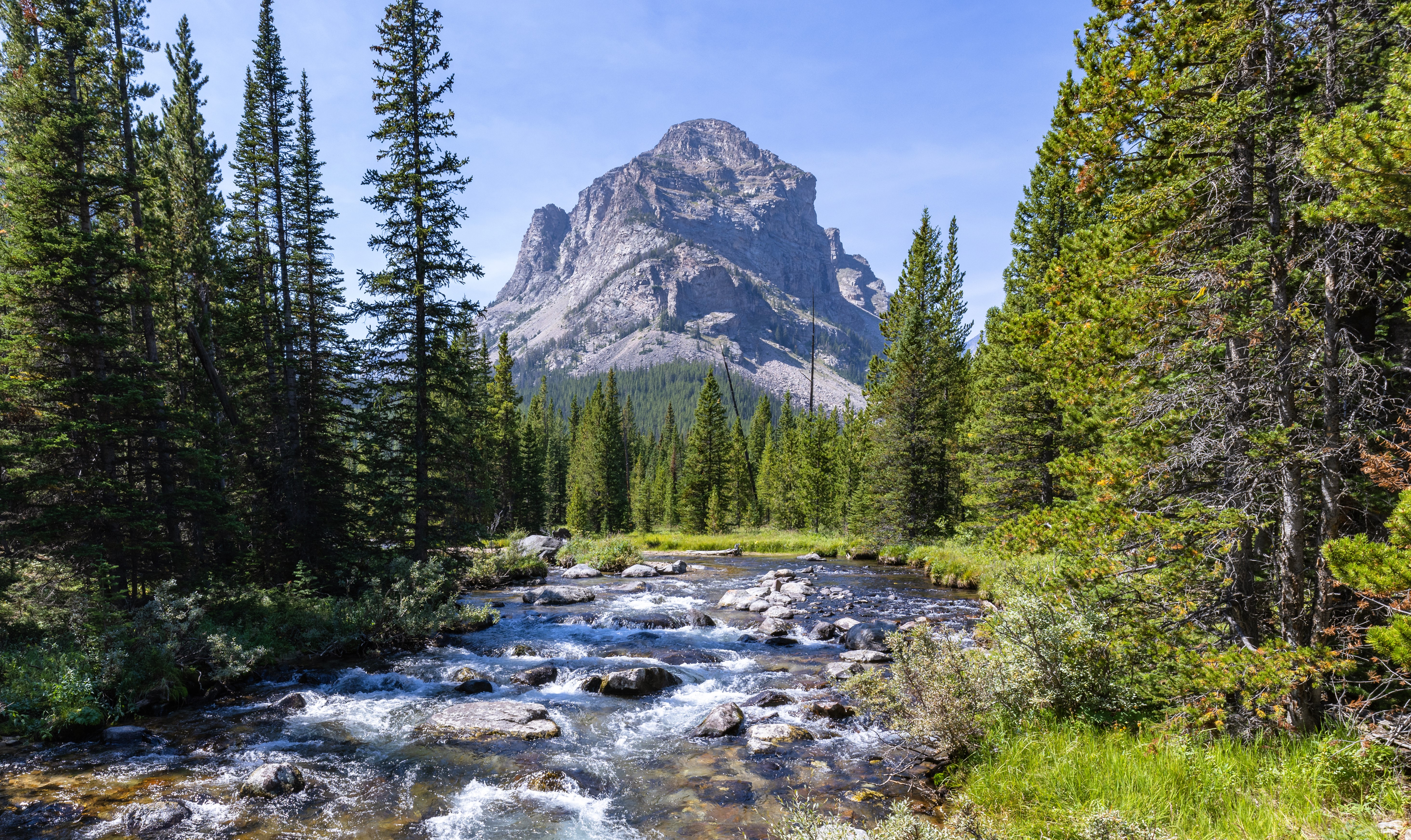
East aspect of Peak 10583 with Lake Fork (creek).
Peak 10583 is the easternmost point of Thunder Mountain

== See also ==
- List of mountains of Montana
- Geology of the Rocky Mountains
