= Poa algida =

Poa algida can refer to the following grass species:

- Poa algida (Sol.) Rupr., a synonym of Phippsia algida (Sol.) R.Br.
- Poa algida Trin., a synonym of Poa annua L.
