= Mount Rearguard =

Mountain in the state of Montana

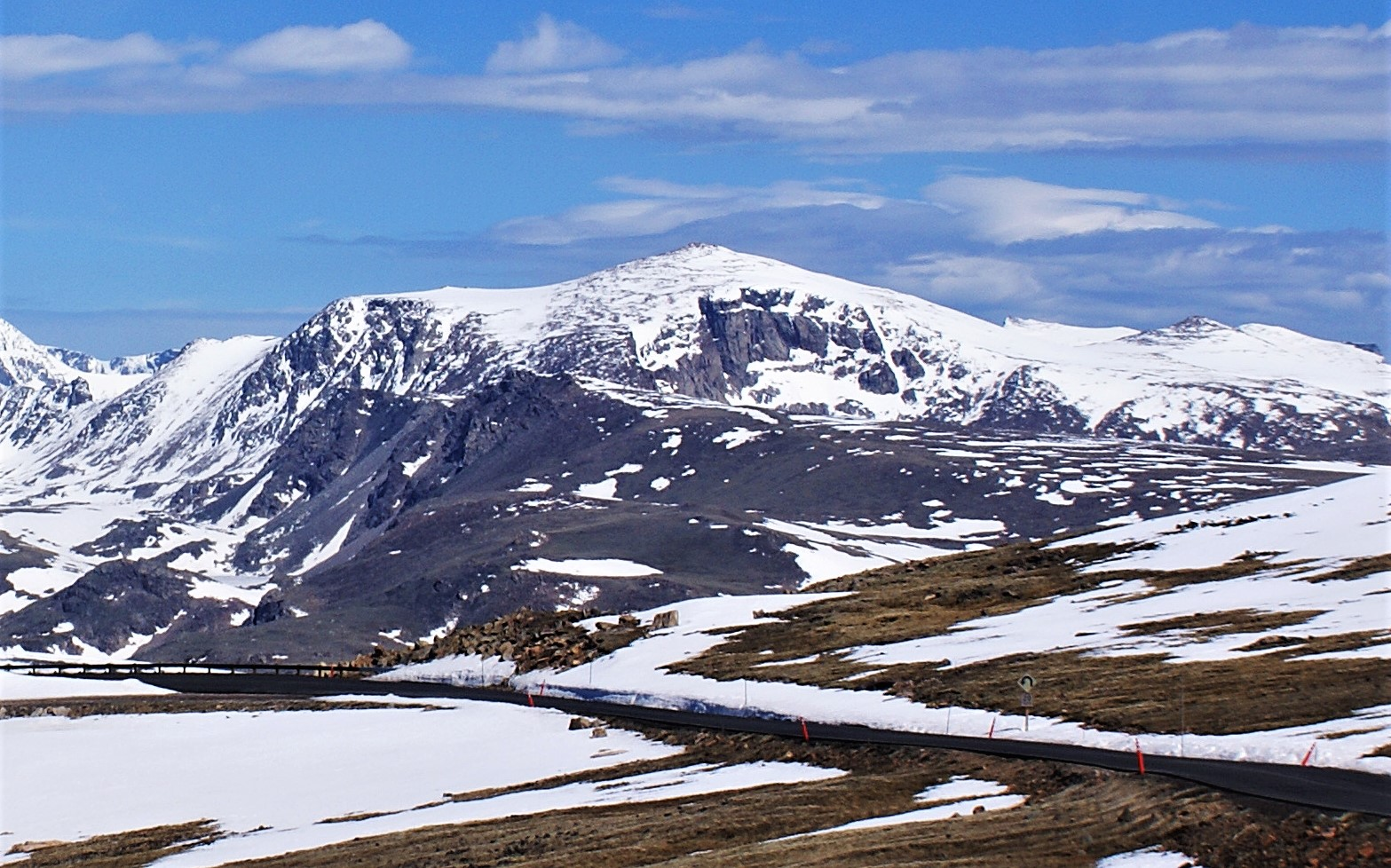
- Southeast aspect, from Beartooth Highway

Highest point
- Elevation: 12,209 ft (3,721 m)
- Prominence: 1,044 ft (318 m)
- Coordinates: 45°02′54″N 109°31′35″W

Geography
- Location within Montana Location within the United States
- Location: Carbon County, Montana, U.S.
- Parent range: Beartooth Mountains
- Topo map: USGS Silver Run Peak

Mount Rearguard (12,209 feet (3,721 m)) is in the Beartooth Mountains in the U.S. state of Montana. The peak is one of the tallest in the Beartooth Mountains and is in the Absaroka-Beartooth Wilderness in Custer National Forest. A small remnant glacier lies to the east of Mount Rearguard, which sits at the western edge of the Hellroaring Plateau.

== Gallery ==
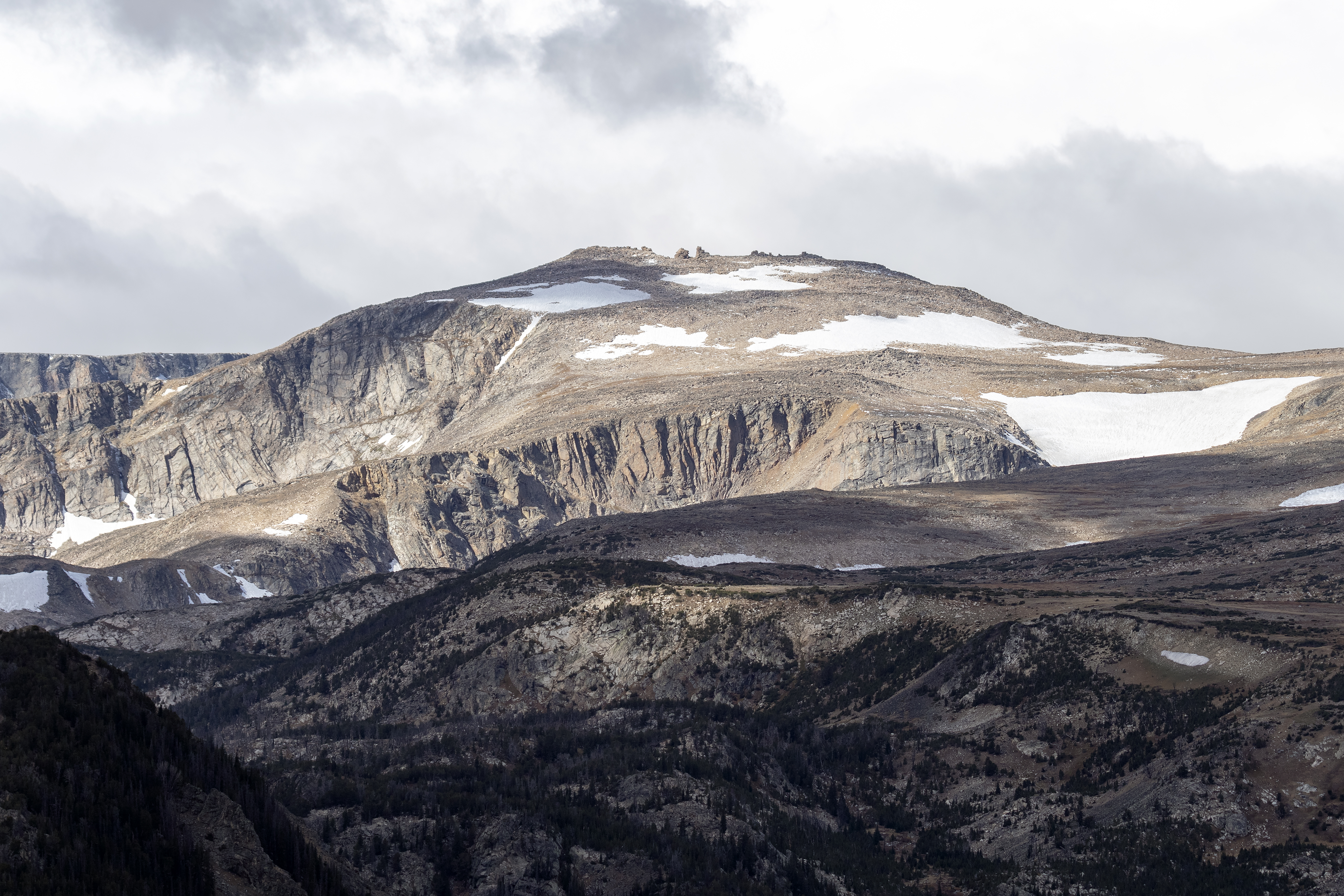

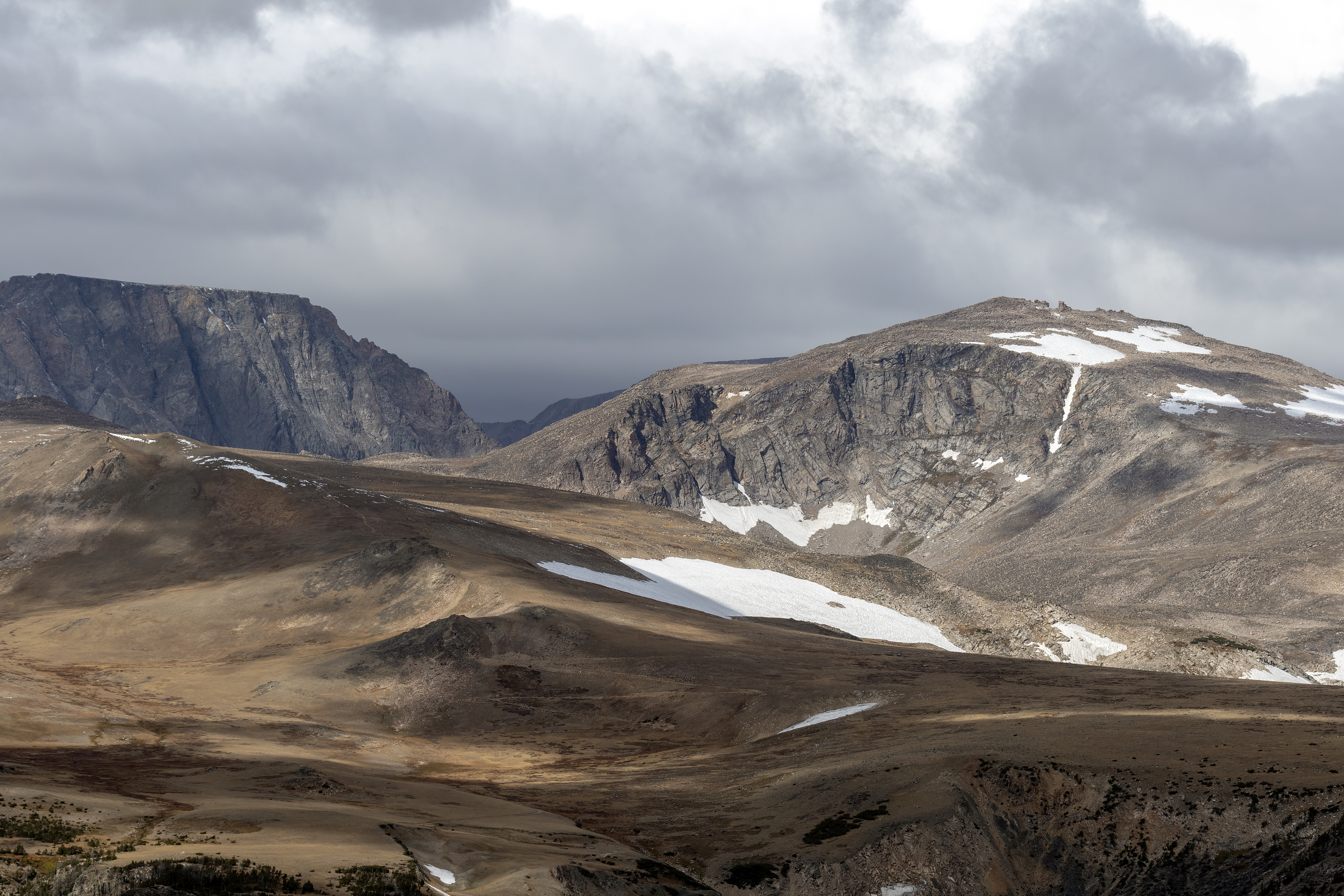
Rearguard to the right

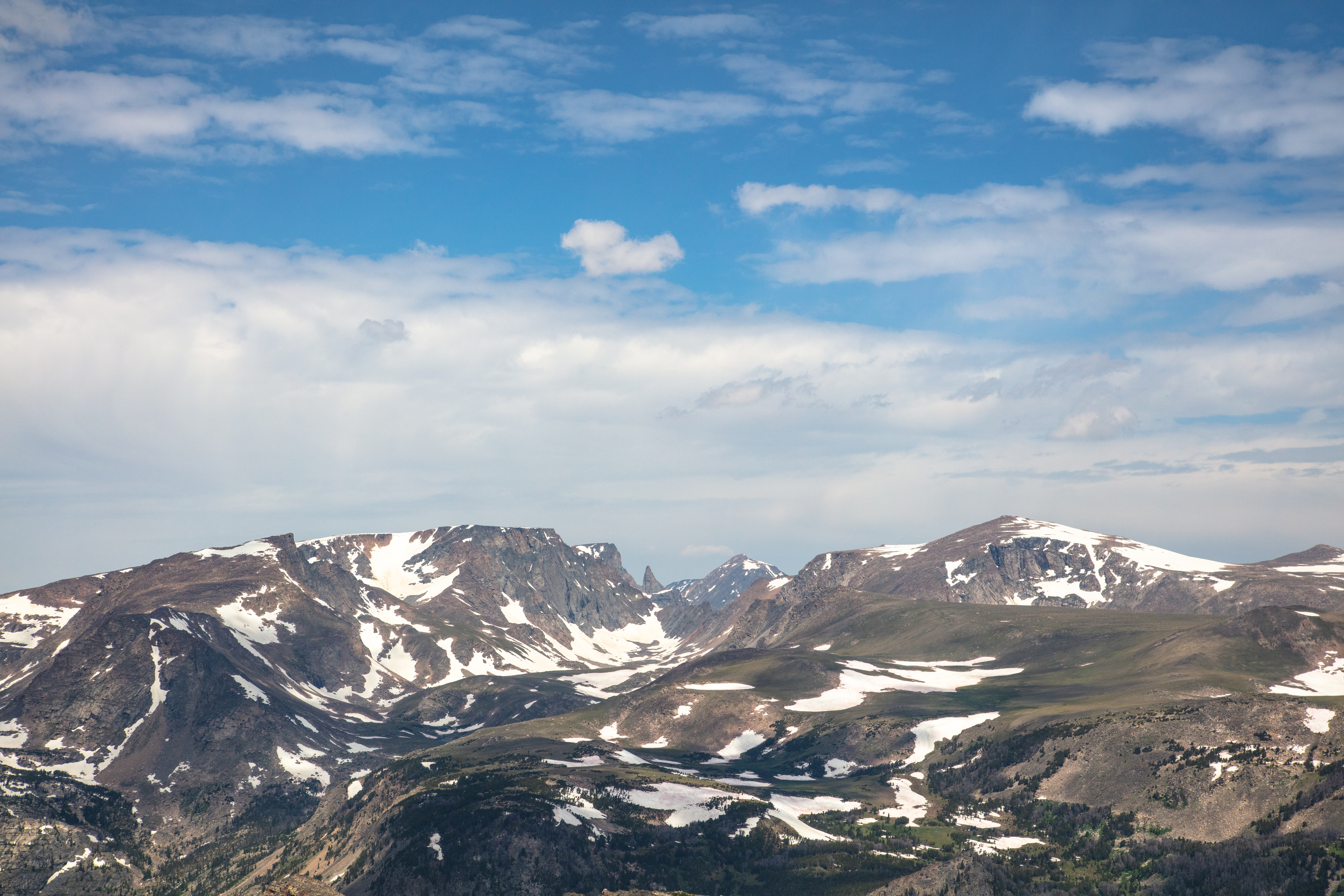
Rearguard to the right. Spirit Mountain to left.
