= Silver Run Peak =

Mountain in Montana, United States

- Location within Montana Location within the United States

Highest point
- Elevation: 12,547 ft (3,824 m)
- Prominence: 1,505 ft (459 m)
- Coordinates: 45°07′16″N 109°32′43″W

Geography
- Location: Carbon County, Montana, U.S.
- Parent range: Beartooth Mountains
- Topo map: USGS Silver Run Peak

Silver Run Peak (12,547 feet (3,824 m)) is in the Beartooth Mountains in the U.S. state of Montana. The peak is one of the tallest in the Beartooth Mountains, the sixth tallest in Montana, and is located in the Absaroka-Beartooth Wilderness of Custer National Forest. Silver Run Peak is the high point of the expansive Silver Run Plateau, a high-altitude plateau in the eastern Beartooth Mountains.

== Climate ==
Climate data for Silver Run Peak 45.1181 N, 109.5513 W, Elevation: 12,146 ft (3,702 m) (1991–2020 normals)
| Month | Jan | Feb | Mar | Apr | May | Jun | Jul | Aug | Sep | Oct | Nov | Dec | Year |
|---|---|---|---|---|---|---|---|---|---|---|---|---|---|
| Mean daily maximum °F (°C) | 17.9 (−7.8) | 17.0 (−8.3) | 21.7 (−5.7) | 27.3 (−2.6) | 36.4 (2.4) | 46.6 (8.1) | 57.0 (13.9) | 56.3 (13.5) | 47.5 (8.6) | 34.7 (1.5) | 23.1 (−4.9) | 17.1 (−8.3) | 33.6 (0.9) |
| Daily mean °F (°C) | 8.6 (−13.0) | 6.9 (−13.9) | 11.0 (−11.7) | 15.8 (−9.0) | 24.5 (−4.2) | 33.8 (1.0) | 42.9 (6.1) | 42.3 (5.7) | 34.3 (1.3) | 23.1 (−4.9) | 13.9 (−10.1) | 8.2 (−13.2) | 22.1 (−5.5) |
| Mean daily minimum °F (°C) | −0.6 (−18.1) | −3.2 (−19.6) | 0.4 (−17.6) | 4.2 (−15.4) | 12.6 (−10.8) | 21.0 (−6.1) | 28.9 (−1.7) | 28.4 (−2.0) | 21.1 (−6.1) | 11.6 (−11.3) | 4.7 (−15.2) | −0.8 (−18.2) | 10.7 (−11.8) |
| Average precipitation inches (mm) | 4.58 (116) | 4.07 (103) | 4.09 (104) | 3.96 (101) | 6.01 (153) | 3.13 (80) | 1.86 (47) | 1.52 (39) | 2.11 (54) | 2.96 (75) | 4.16 (106) | 4.62 (117) | 43.07 (1,095) |
Source: PRISM Climate Group
