= Sundance Mountain =

Mountain in Carbon County, Montana, United States

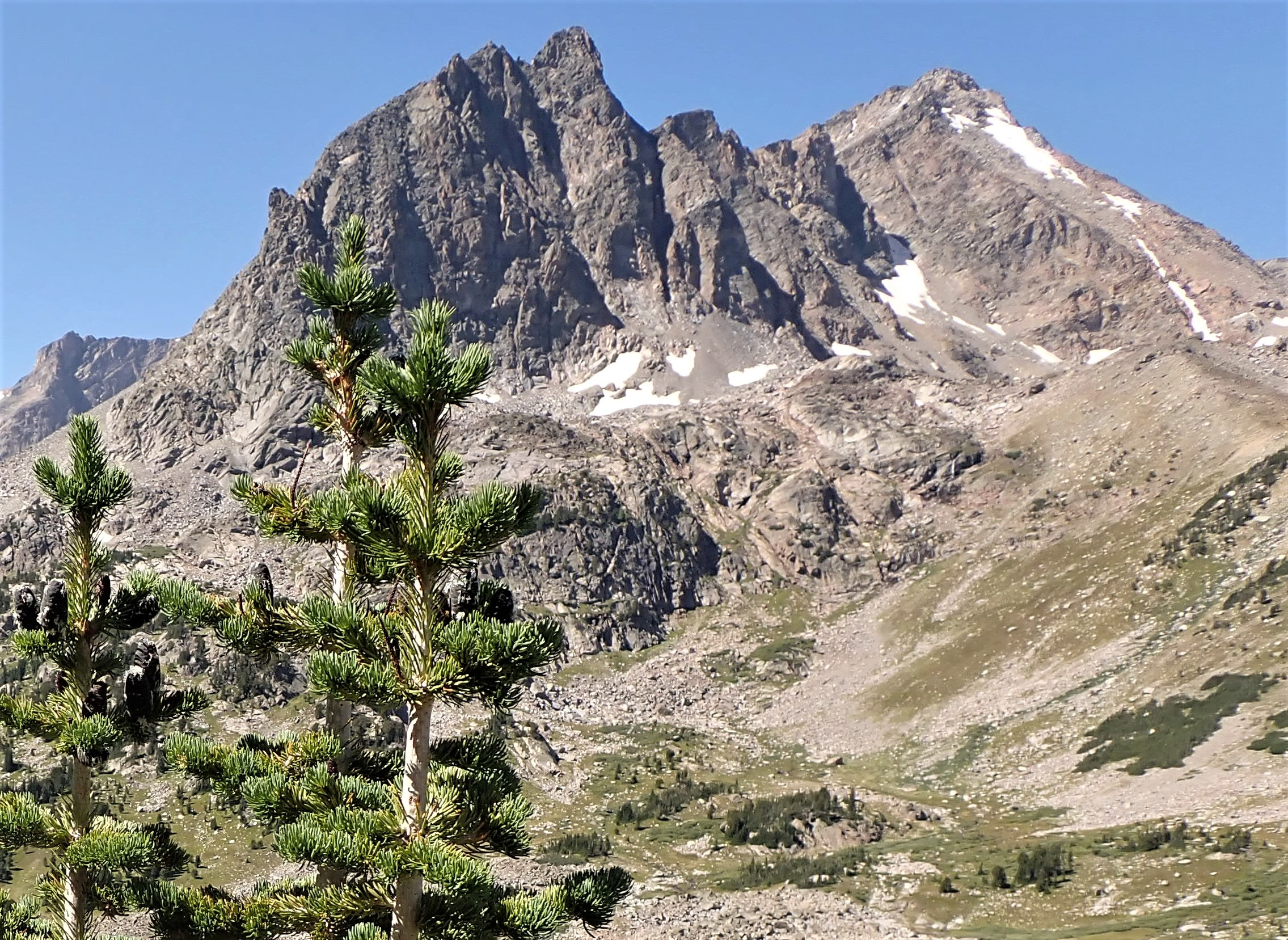
- East aspect, summit in upper right

Highest point
- Elevation: 12,267 ft (3,739 m)
- Prominence: 582 ft (177 m)
- Coordinates: 45°06′23″N 109°36′34″W

Geography
- Location within Montana Location within the United States
- Location: Carbon County, Montana, U.S.
- Parent range: Beartooth Mountains
- Topo map: USGS Silver Run Peak

Sundance Mountain (12,267 feet (3,739 m)) is in the Beartooth Mountains in the U.S. state of Montana. The peak is one of the tallest in the Beartooth Mountains and is in the Absaroka-Beartooth Wilderness in Custer National Forest.

== Climate ==
Climate data for Sundance Mountain 45.1088 N, 109.6264 W, Elevation: 12,073 ft (3,680 m) (1991–2020 normals)
| Month | Jan | Feb | Mar | Apr | May | Jun | Jul | Aug | Sep | Oct | Nov | Dec | Year |
|---|---|---|---|---|---|---|---|---|---|---|---|---|---|
| Mean daily maximum °F (°C) | 18.1 (−7.7) | 17.2 (−8.2) | 21.9 (−5.6) | 27.4 (−2.6) | 36.6 (2.6) | 46.9 (8.3) | 57.4 (14.1) | 56.7 (13.7) | 47.8 (8.8) | 35.0 (1.7) | 23.3 (−4.8) | 17.4 (−8.1) | 33.8 (1.0) |
| Daily mean °F (°C) | 8.9 (−12.8) | 7.1 (−13.8) | 11.3 (−11.5) | 15.9 (−8.9) | 24.6 (−4.1) | 34.0 (1.1) | 43.1 (6.2) | 42.6 (5.9) | 34.5 (1.4) | 23.4 (−4.8) | 14.1 (−9.9) | 8.4 (−13.1) | 22.3 (−5.4) |
| Mean daily minimum °F (°C) | −0.4 (−18.0) | −3.0 (−19.4) | 0.6 (−17.4) | 4.4 (−15.3) | 12.6 (−10.8) | 21.1 (−6.1) | 28.9 (−1.7) | 28.5 (−1.9) | 21.2 (−6.0) | 11.8 (−11.2) | 5.0 (−15.0) | −0.5 (−18.1) | 10.9 (−11.7) |
| Average precipitation inches (mm) | 5.61 (142) | 5.06 (129) | 5.10 (130) | 4.61 (117) | 6.00 (152) | 4.17 (106) | 2.76 (70) | 2.27 (58) | 2.19 (56) | 3.30 (84) | 4.95 (126) | 5.68 (144) | 51.7 (1,314) |
Source: PRISM Climate Group

== See also ==
- List of mountains in Montana
