= Mount Hague =

Mountain in the state of Montana

- Location within Montana Location within the United States

Highest point
- Elevation: 12,328 ft (3,758 m)
- Prominence: 1,203 ft (367 m)
- Coordinates: 45°15′40″N 109°50′14″W

Geography
- Location: Stillwater County, Montana, U.S.
- Parent range: Beartooth Mountains
- Topo map: USGS Mount Wood

Mount Hague (12,328 feet (3,758 m)) is in the Beartooth Mountains in the U.S. state of Montana. The peak is one of the tallest in the Beartooth Mountains and is in the Absaroka-Beartooth Wilderness of Custer National Forest.
