= Sylvan Peak =

Mountain in Montana, United States

Sylvan Mountain
- Location within Montana Location within the United States

Highest point
- Elevation: 11,940 ft (3,640 m)
- Prominence: 486 ft (148 m)
- Coordinates: 45°09′51″N 109°36′17″W

Geography
- Location: Carbon County, Montana, U.S.
- Parent range: Beartooth Mountains
- Topo map: USGS Sylvan Peak

Sylvan Peak (11,940 feet (3,640 m)) is in the Beartooth Mountains in the U.S. state of Montana. The peak is in the Absaroka-Beartooth Wilderness in Custer National Forest.
