= Metcalf Mountain =

Mountain in Montana, United States

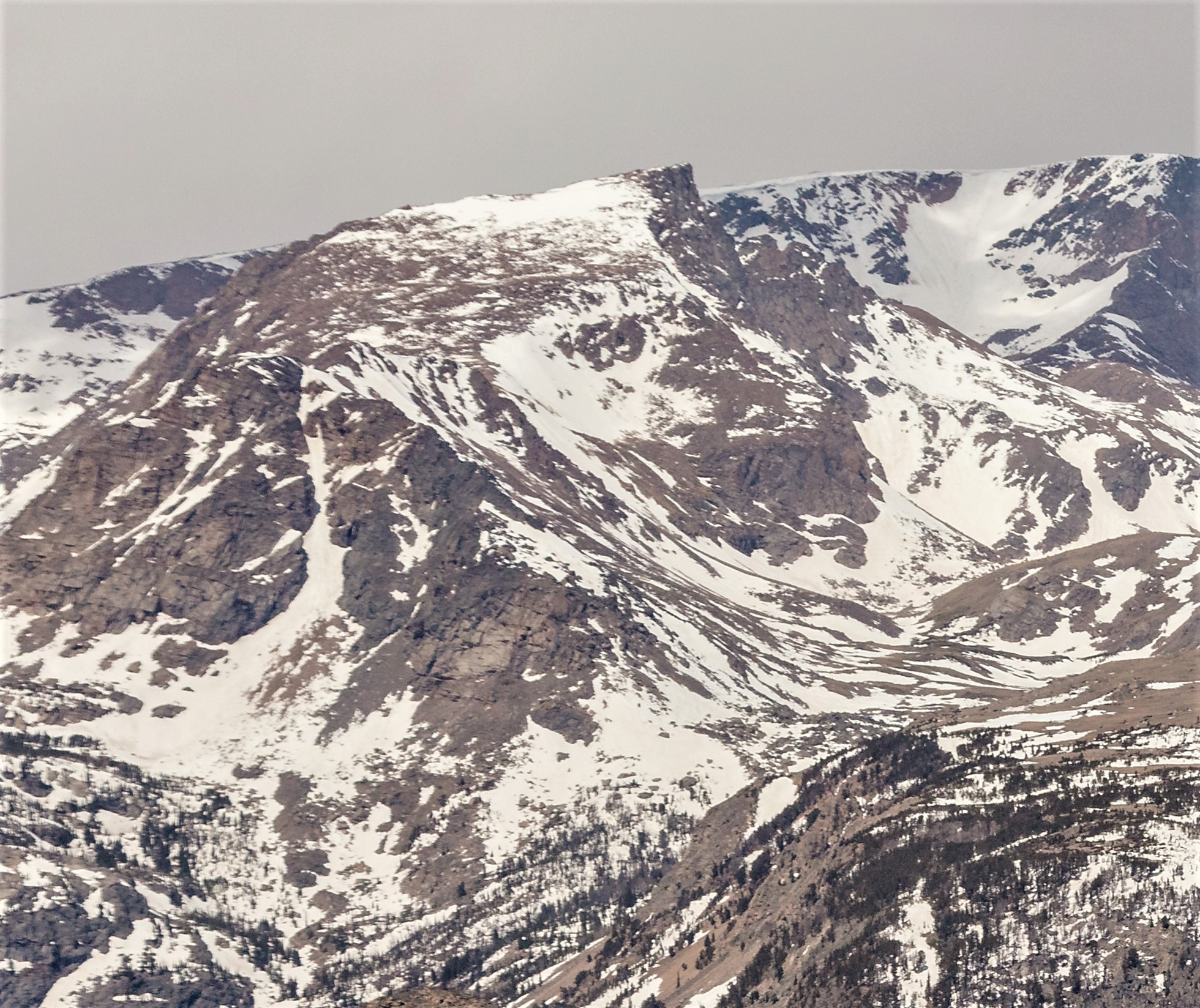
- Southeast aspect

Highest point
- Elevation: 11,982 ft (3,652 m)
- Prominence: 817 ft (249 m)
- Coordinates: 45°01′40″N 109°32′35″W

Geography
- Location within Montana Location within the United States
- Location: Carbon County, Montana, U.S.
- Parent range: Beartooth Mountains
- Topo map: USGS Silver Run Peak

Metcalf Mountain (11,982 feet (3,652 m)) is in the Beartooth Mountains in the U.S. state of Montana. The peak is in the Absaroka-Beartooth Wilderness in Custer National Forest and named for Lee Metcalf, former U.S. Senator from Montana.

== Gallery ==
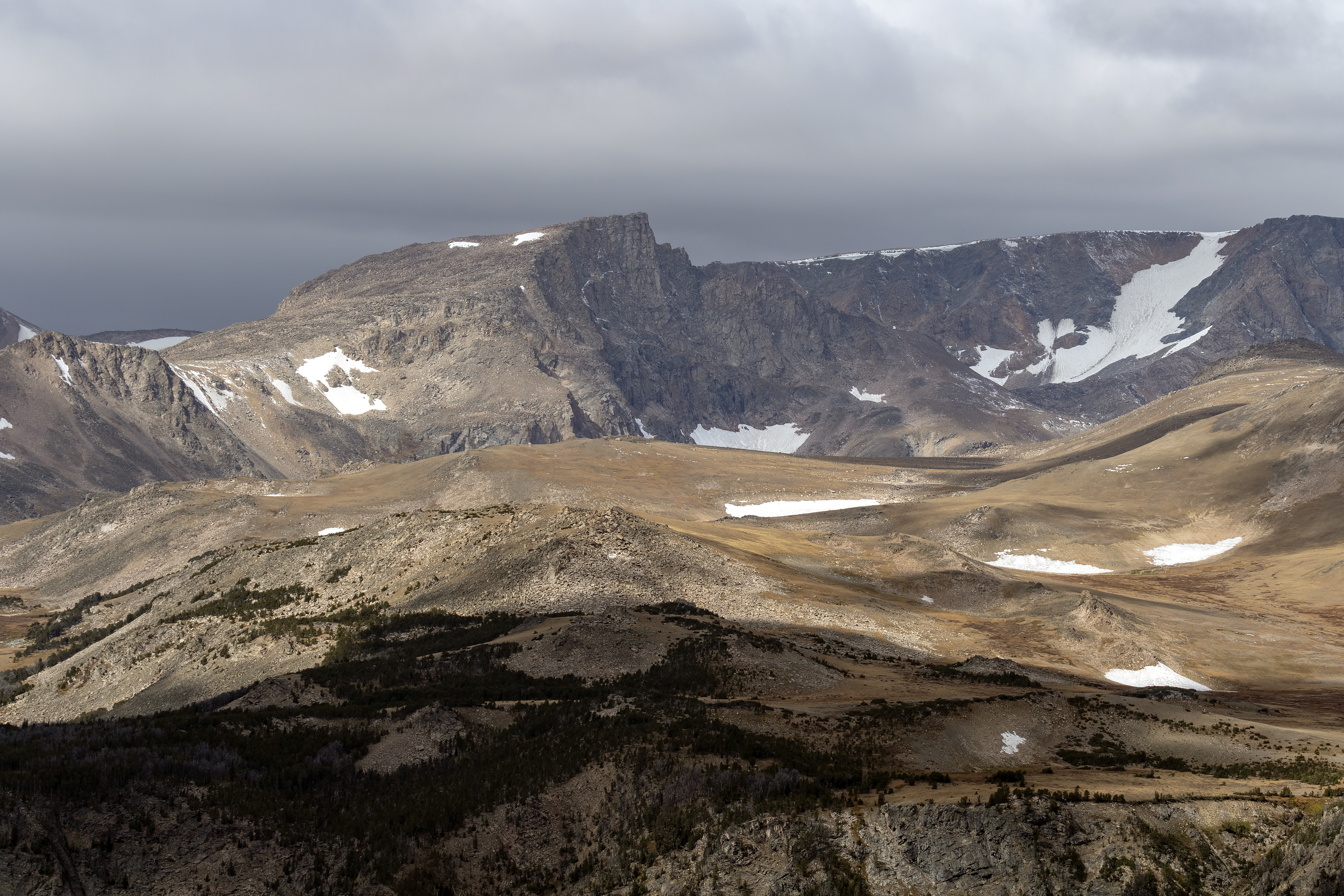
Metcalf Mountain from Beartooth Highway

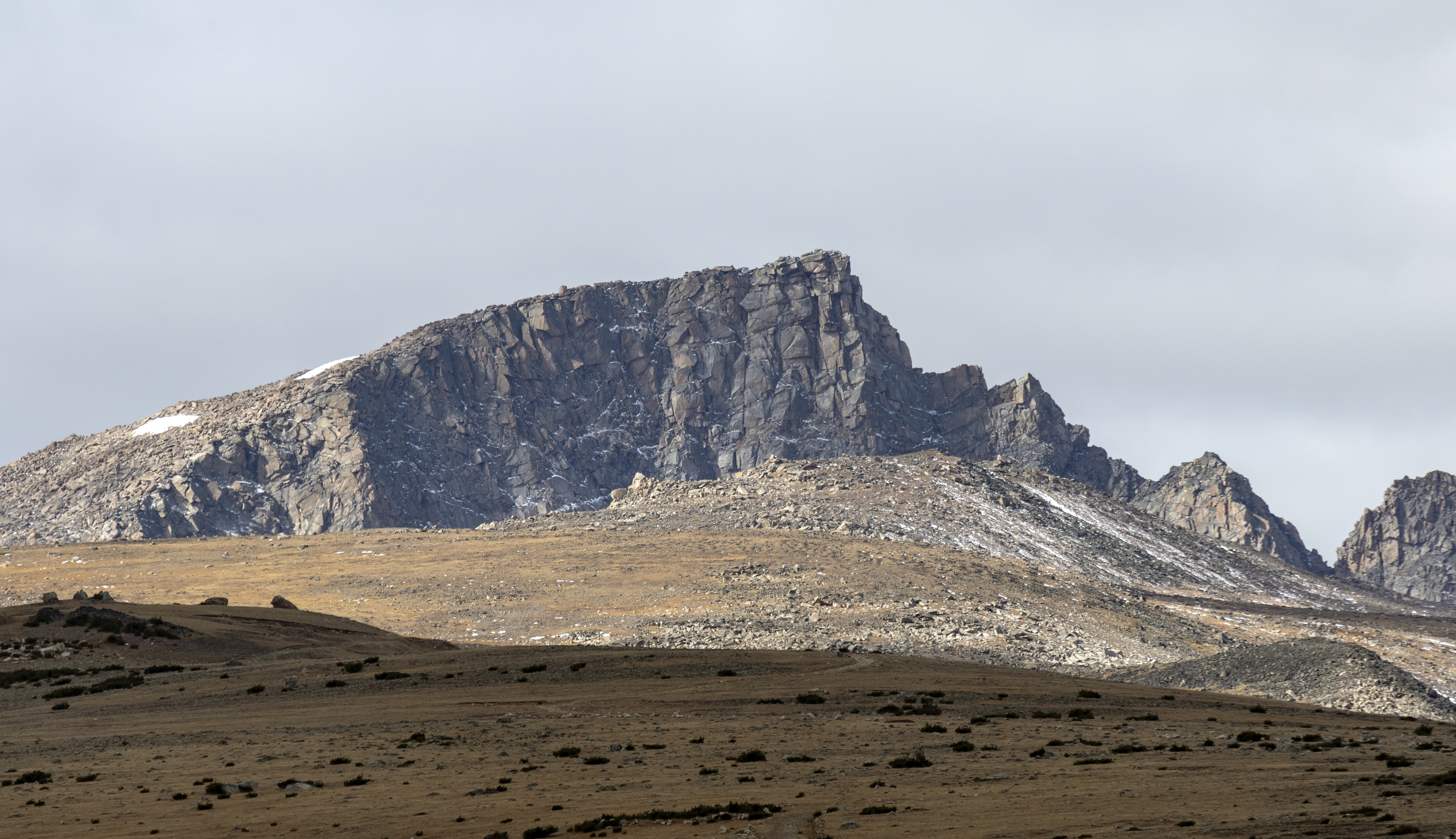
