= Mount Inabnit =

Mountain in the state of Montana

- Location within Montana Location within the United States

Highest point
- Elevation: 11,931 ft (3,637 m)
- Prominence: 486 ft (148 m)
- Coordinates: 45°07′47″N 109°37′54″W

Geography
- Location: Carbon County, Montana, U.S.
- Parent range: Beartooth Mountains
- Topo map: USGS Alpine

Mount Inabnit (11,931 feet (3,637 m)) is in the Beartooth Mountains in the U.S. state of Montana. The peak is in the Absaroka-Beartooth Wilderness in Custer National Forest.
