= Whitetail Peak =

Mountain in Montana, United States

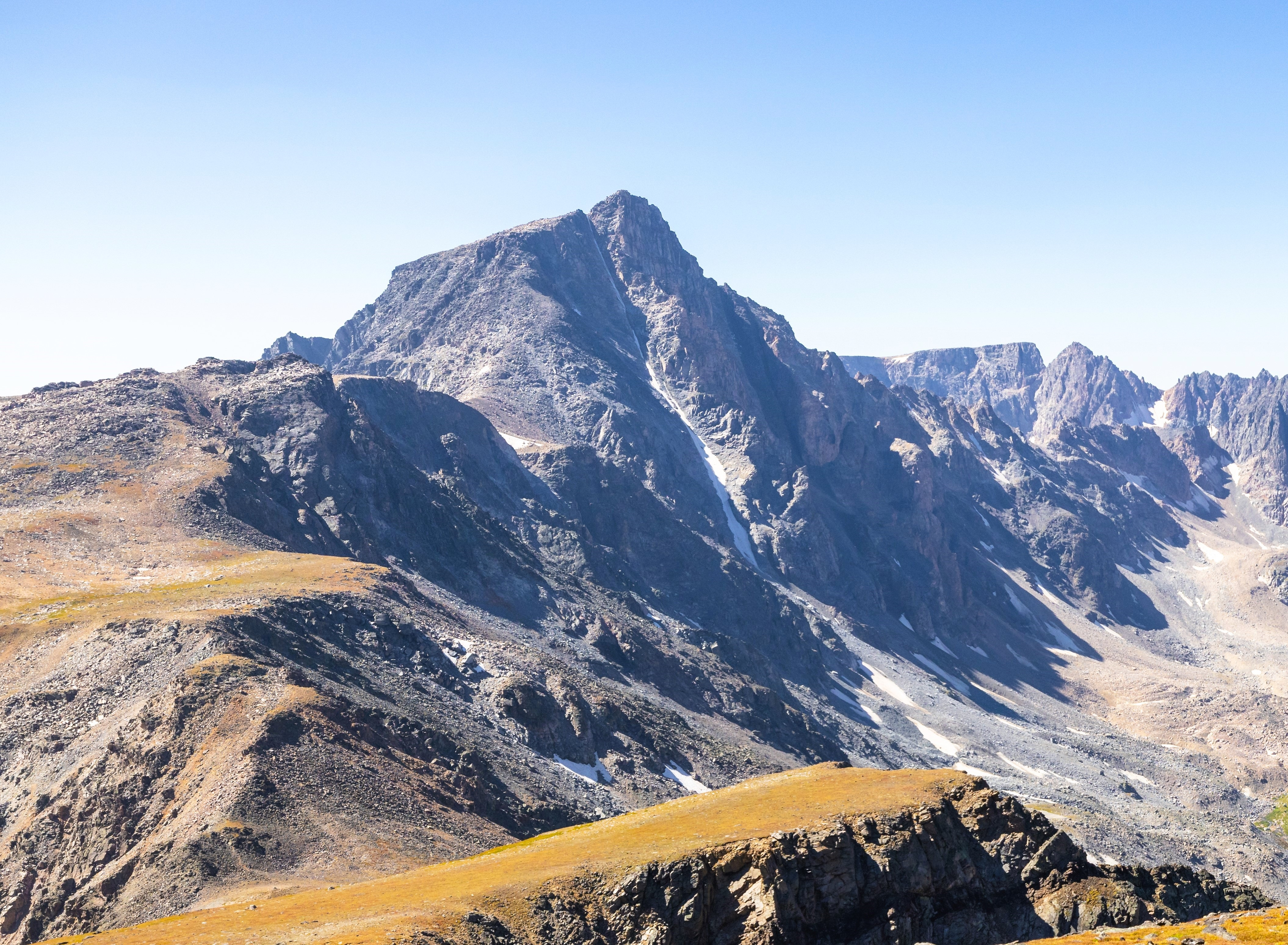
- Northeast aspect

Highest point
- Elevation: 12,556 ft (3,827 m)
- Prominence: 1,271 ft (387 m)
- Coordinates: 45°05′20″N 109°35′16″W

Geography
- Location within Montana Location within the United States
- Location: Carbon County, Montana, U.S.
- Parent range: Beartooth Mountains
- Topo map: USGS Silver Run Peak

Whitetail Peak (12,556 feet (3,827 m)) is in the Beartooth Mountains in the U.S. state of Montana. The peak is one of the tallest in the Beartooth Mountains, the fifth-tallest in Montana, and is located in the Absaroka-Beartooth Wilderness of Custer National Forest.
