= Snowbank Mountain (Montana) =

Mountain in Montana, United States

- Location within Montana Location within the United States

Highest point
- Elevation: 12,089 ft (3,685 m)
- Prominence: 844 ft (257 m)
- Coordinates: 45°05′52″N 109°41′42″W

Geography
- Location: Carbon County, Montana, U.S.
- Parent range: Beartooth Mountains
- Topo map: USGS Castle Mountain

Snowbank Mountain (12,089 feet (3,685 m)) is in the Beartooth Mountains in the U.S. state of Montana. The peak is in the Absaroka-Beartooth Wilderness in Custer National Forest. The tiny Snowbank Glacier lies immediately southeast of the peak.
