= Sundance Glacier =

Alpine glacier in the U.S. state of Montana

- Location within Montana
- Type: Mountain glacier
- Location: Beartooth Mountains, Carbon County, Montana, U.S.
- Coordinates: 45°06′11″N 109°38′35″W
- Area: Approximately 70 acres (0.28 km^{2})
- Terminus: Talus
- Status: Unknown

Sundance Glacier is in the U.S. state of Montana. The glacier is situated in the Beartooth Mountains at an elevation of 10,600 feet (3,200 m) above sea level and is immediately northeast of Castle Rock Mountain. The glacier covers approximately 70 acres (0.28 km^{2}) and is located in a deep cirque below Castle Rock Mountain.

== See also ==
- List of glaciers in the United States
