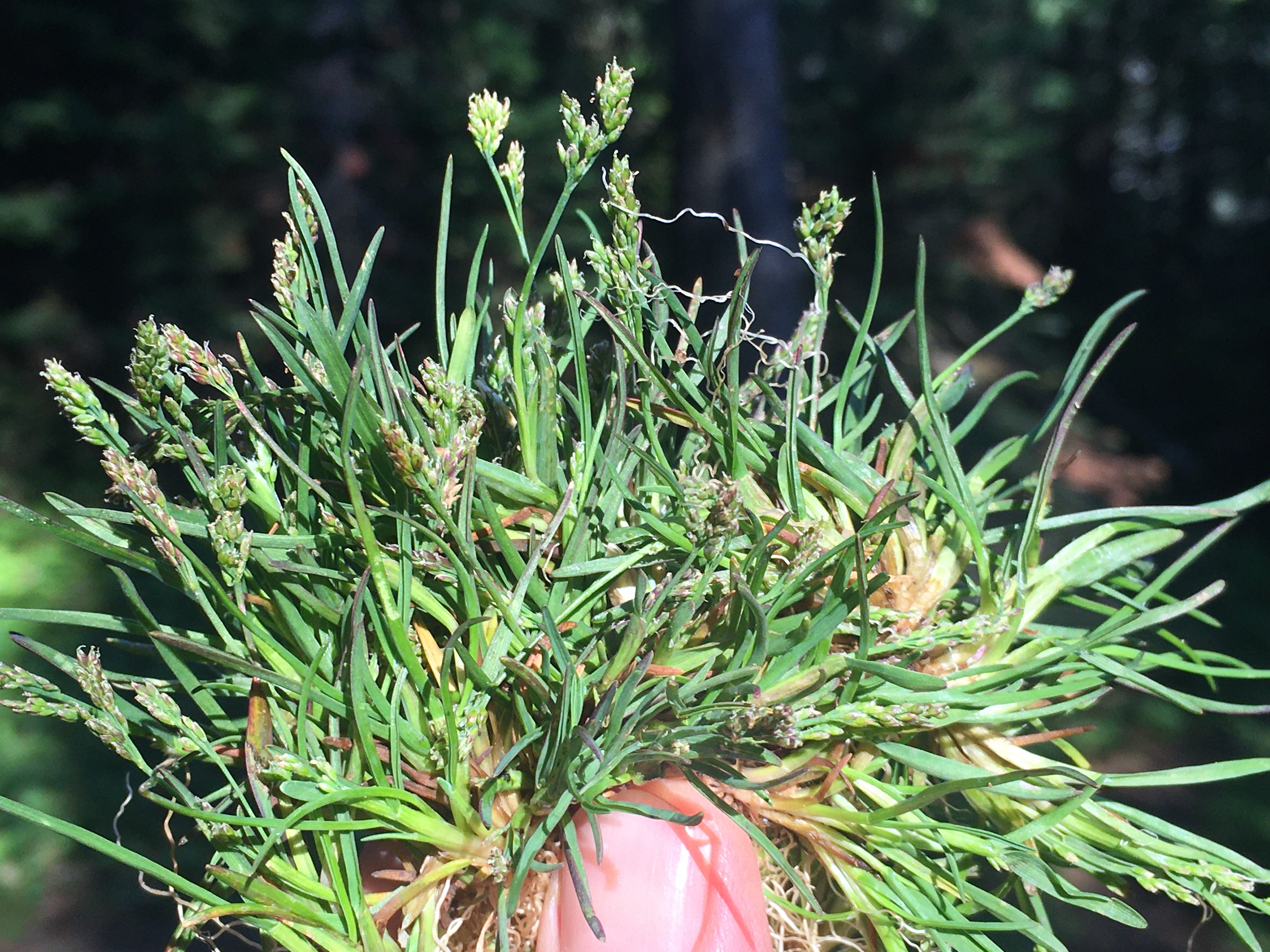
- On the Froze-to-Death Plateau
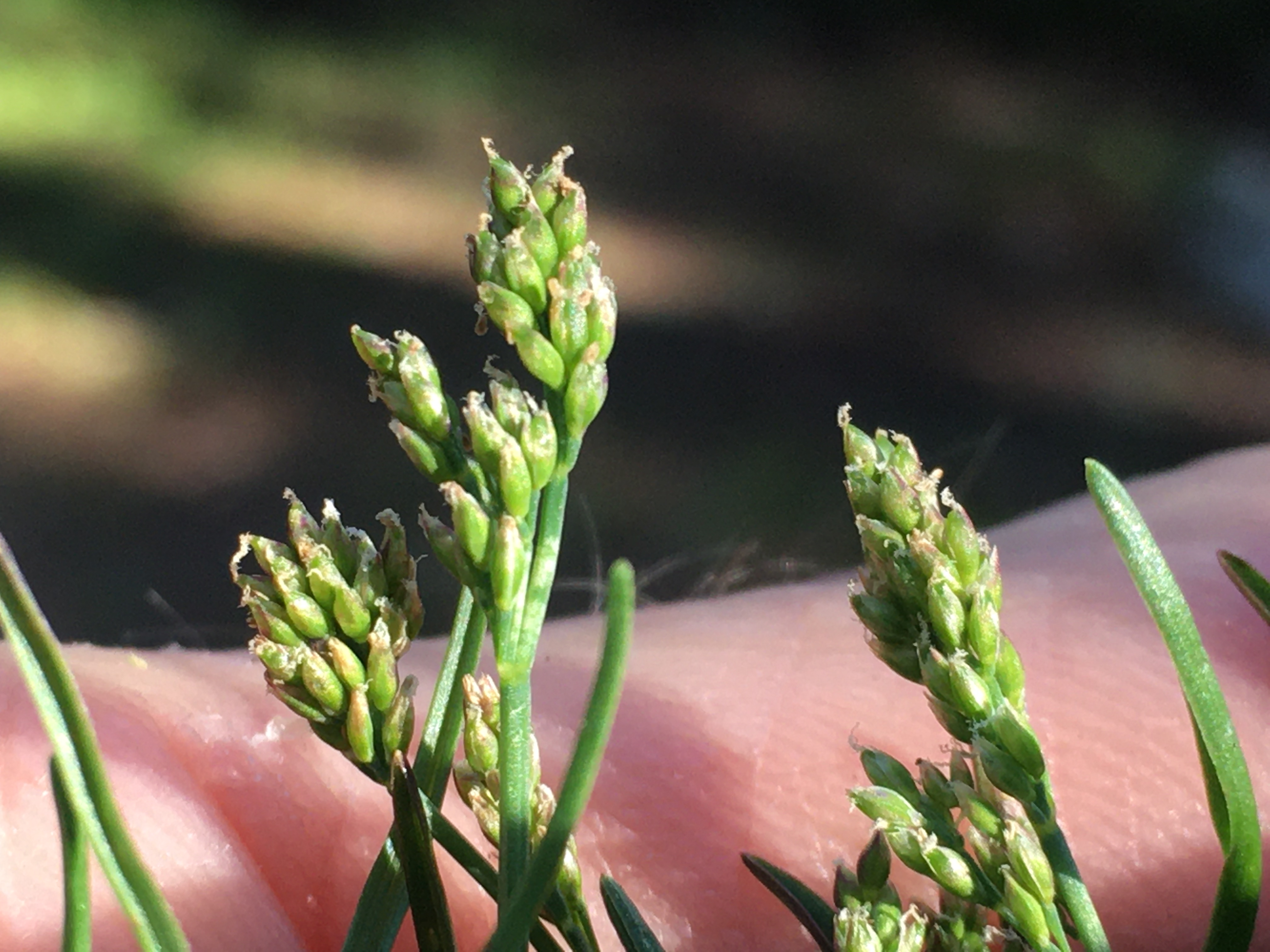
- Close-up of inflorescences

Conservation status
- Least Concern (IUCN 3.1)

Scientific classification
- Kingdom: Plantae
- Clade: Embryophytes
- Clade: Tracheophytes
- Clade: Spermatophytes
- Clade: Angiosperms
- Clade: Monocots
- Clade: Commelinids
- Order: Poales
- Family: Poaceae
- Subfamily: Pooideae
- Genus: Phippsia
- Species: P. algida

Binomial name
- Phippsia algida (Sol.) R.Br.

Synonyms
- List: Agrostis algida Sol.; Catabrosa algida Fr.; Catabrosa monandra Fr.; Coleanthus algidus (Sol.) D.L.Fu; Colpodium monandrum Trin.; Glyceria algida (Sol.) Hartm.; Phippsia algida f. flavescens Holmb.; Phippsia foliosa V.N.Vassil.; Phippsia monandra Hook. & Arn.; Poa algida (Sol.) Rupr.; Trichodium algidum (Sol.) Roem. & Schult.; Vilfa algida (Sol.) Trin.; Vilfa monandra Trin.

= Phippsia algida =

Species of plant

Phippsia algida, the ice grass, is a species of flowering plant in the family Poaceae. It is native to the high arctic, and higher elevations in the Rockies. A perennial reaching 15 cm (6 in), it can tolerate a wide range of soils, from highly saline or alkaline, to acidic peat bogs, and can be found from tidal mudflats, to tundra, to mountaintops. It has been assessed as Least Concern.
