= Castle Rock Glacier =

Alpine glacier in Montana, United States

- Location within Montana
- Type: Mountain glacier
- Location: Beartooth Mountains, Carbon County, Montana, U.S.
- Coordinates: 45°05′32″N 109°39′20″W
- Length: 650 yards (590 m)
- Terminus: Proglacial lake
- Status: Unknown

Castle Rock Glacier is in the U.S. state of Montana. The glacier is situated south of Castle Rock Mountain in the Beartooth Mountains. The glacier terminus is a proglacial lake and the glacier extends from 11,700 to 11,000 ft (3,600 to 3,400 m).

== See also ==
- List of glaciers in the United States
