= Spirit Mountain (Montana) =

Mountain in Montana, United States

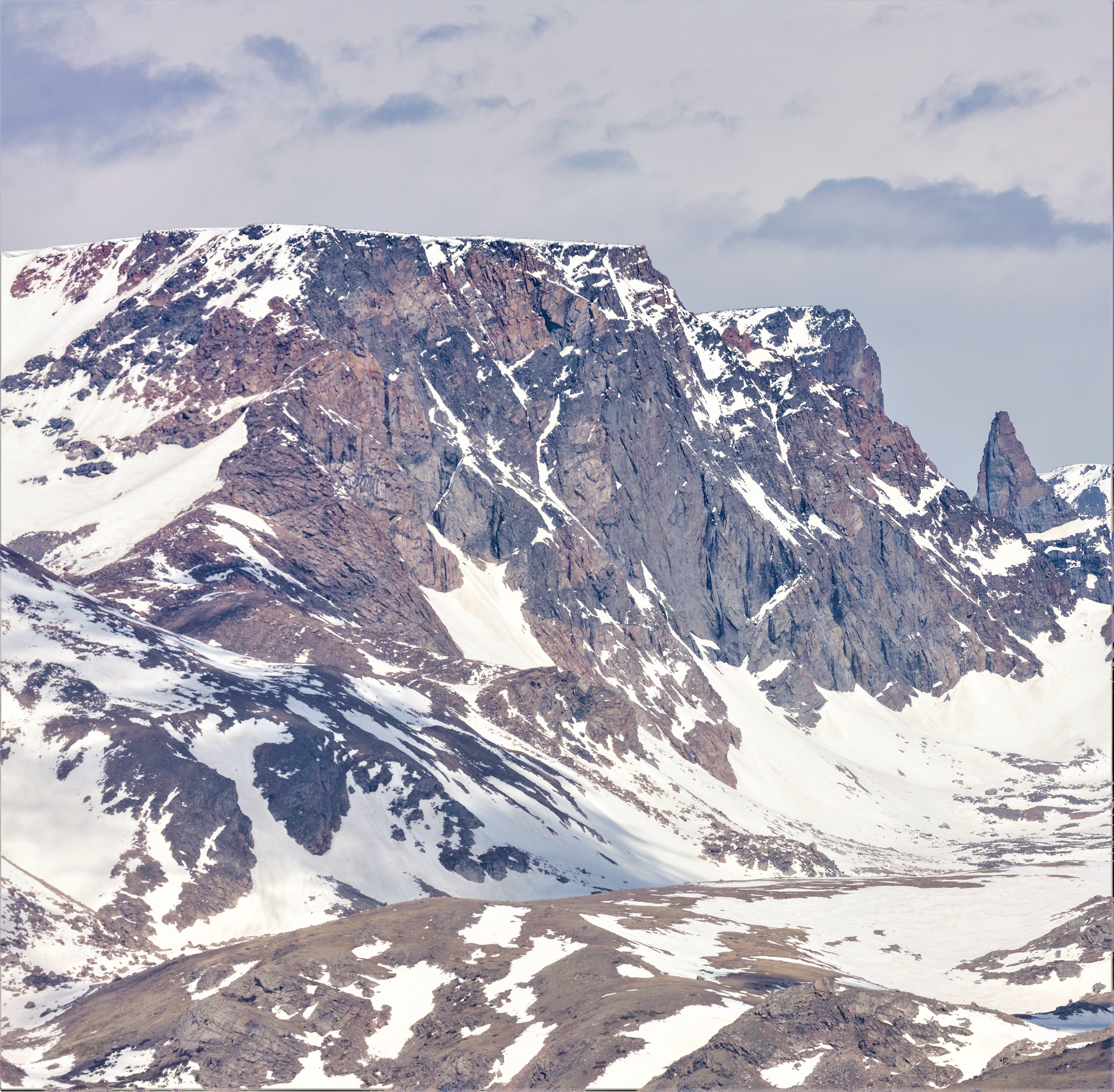
- Southeast aspect, from Beartooth Pass

Highest point
- Elevation: 12,288 ft (3,745 m)
- Prominence: 763 ft (233 m)
- Coordinates: 45°02′25″N 109°33′04″W

Geography
- Location within Montana Location within the United States
- Location: Carbon County, Montana, U.S.
- Parent range: Beartooth Mountains
- Topo map: USGS Silver Run Peak

Spirit Mountain (12,288 feet; 3,745 m) is in the Beartooth Mountains in the U.S. state of Montana. The peak is one of the tallest in the Beartooth Mountains and is in the Absaroka-Beartooth Wilderness, in Custer National Forest.

== Climate ==
Based on the Köppen climate classification, Spirit Mountain is located in a subarctic climate zone characterized by long, usually very cold winters, and mild summers. Winter temperatures can drop below −10 °F with wind chill factors below −30 °F.
