= Castle Mountain (Carbon County, Montana) =

Mountain in Montana, United States

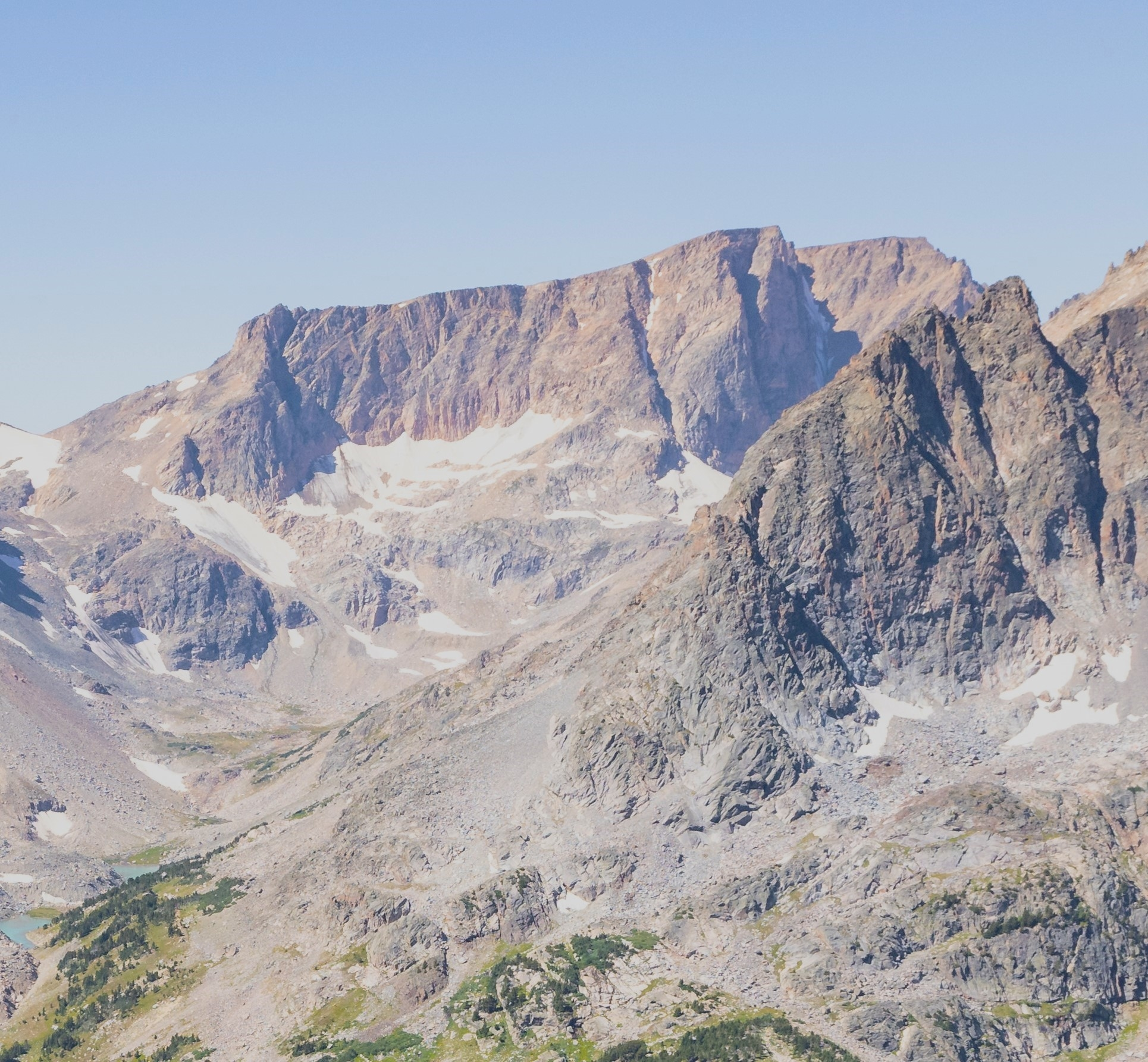
- East aspect

Highest point
- Elevation: 12,617 ft (3,846 m)
- Prominence: 2,652 ft (808 m)
- Coordinates: 45°05′56″N 109°37′50″W

Geography
- Location within Montana Location within the United States
- Location: Carbon County, Montana, U.S.
- Parent range: Beartooth Mountains
- Topo map: USGS Castle Mountain

Castle Mountain (12,617 feet (3,846 m)) is in the Beartooth Mountains in the U.S. state of Montana, about 15 miles (24 km) east-northeast of Cooke City. It is located in the Gallatin National Forest and Custer National Forest, just outside the northern boundary of Yellowstone National Park in the Absaroka–Beartooth Wilderness.

The peak is the third tallest in the Beartooth Mountains, and the highest point in Carbon County, Montana.
