= Spirit Mountain Casino =

Spirit Mountain Casino may refer to:

- Spirit Mountain Casino (Arizona), a casino in the United States
- Spirit Mountain Casino (Oregon), United States
