= Granite Peak (Montana) =

Mountain in Montana, United States

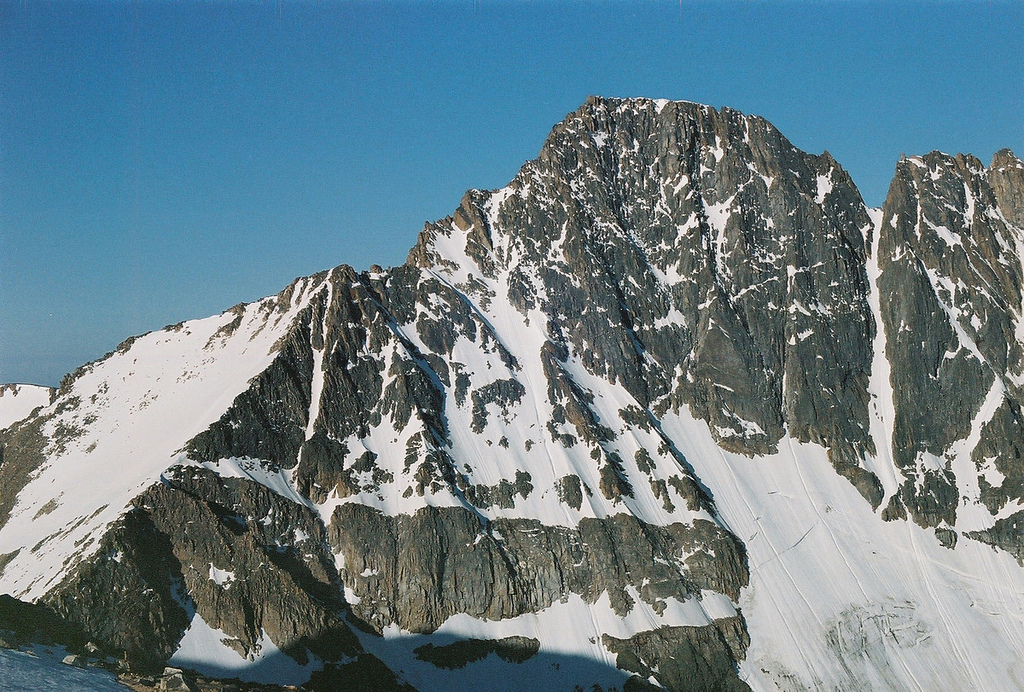

Highest point
- Elevation: 12,807 ft (3,904 m) NAVD 88
- Prominence: 4,759 ft (1,451 m)
- Listing: U.S. state high point 10th
- Coordinates: 45°09′48″N 109°48′27″W

Geography
- Location within Montana
- Location: Park County, Montana, U.S.
- Parent range: Beartooth Mountains
- Topo map: USGS Granite Peak

Climbing
- First ascent: 1923 by Elers Koch
- Easiest route: Southwest Couloir (class 3 scramble)

Granite Peak, at an elevation of 12,807 feet (3,904 m) above sea level, is the highest natural point in the U.S. state of Montana, and the tenth-highest state high point in the nation. It lies within the Absaroka-Beartooth Wilderness in Park County, very near the borders of Stillwater County and Carbon County. Granite Peak is 10 miles (16 km) north of the Wyoming border and 45 miles (72 km) southwest of Columbus, Montana.

Granite Peak is often considered the second most difficult state high point to climb after Denali in Alaska, due to technical climbing, poor weather, and route finding. Granite Peak's first ascent was made by Elers Koch, James C. Whitham, and R.T. Ferguson on August 29, 1923, after several failed attempts by others. It was the last of the state high points to be climbed. Today, climbers typically spend two or three days ascending the peak, stopping over on the Froze-to-Death Plateau, although some climbers choose to ascend the peak in a single day. Another route that has gained popularity in recent years is the Southwest Couloir route, a non-technical route from the south starting near Cooke City; climbers generally take two days to complete it.

== Climate ==
Climate data for Granite Peak 45.1650 N, 109.8158 W, Elevation: 12,192 ft (3,716 m) (1991–2020 normals)
Month	Jan	Feb	Mar	Apr	May	Jun	Jul	Aug	Sep	Oct	Nov	Dec	Year
Mean daily maximum °F (°C)	17.8 (−7.9)	16.9 (−8.4)	21.7 (−5.7)	27.2 (−2.7)	36.5 (2.5)	46.3 (7.9)	56.6 (13.7)	56.0 (13.3)	47.1 (8.4)	34.2 (1.2)	23.0 (−5.0)	17.0 (−8.3)	33.4 (0.8)
Daily mean °F (°C)	8.5 (−13.1)	6.8 (−14.0)	10.9 (−11.7)	15.6 (−9.1)	24.4 (−4.2)	33.5 (0.8)	42.5 (5.8)	42.0 (5.6)	33.9 (1.1)	22.8 (−5.1)	13.8 (−10.1)	8.1 (−13.3)	21.9 (−5.6)
Mean daily minimum °F (°C)	−0.8 (−18.2)	−3.4 (−19.7)	0.2 (−17.7)	4.0 (−15.6)	12.2 (−11.0)	20.7 (−6.3)	28.4 (−2.0)	27.9 (−2.3)	20.7 (−6.3)	11.5 (−11.4)	4.6 (−15.2)	−0.9 (−18.3)	10.4 (−12.0)
Average precipitation inches (mm)	6.87 (174)	6.61 (168)	6.59 (167)	6.24 (158)	5.44 (138)	4.55 (116)	3.23 (82)	2.68 (68)	2.88 (73)	4.53 (115)	6.52 (166)	7.50 (191)	63.64 (1,616)
Source: PRISM Climate Group

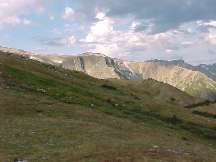
Froze-to-Death Plateau, on the slope leading to the summit

== See also ==
- List of mountains in Montana
- List of U.S. states by elevation
