= Absaroka–Beartooth Wilderness =

Protected wilderness area in Montana and Wyoming, United States

- IUCN category Ib (wilderness area)
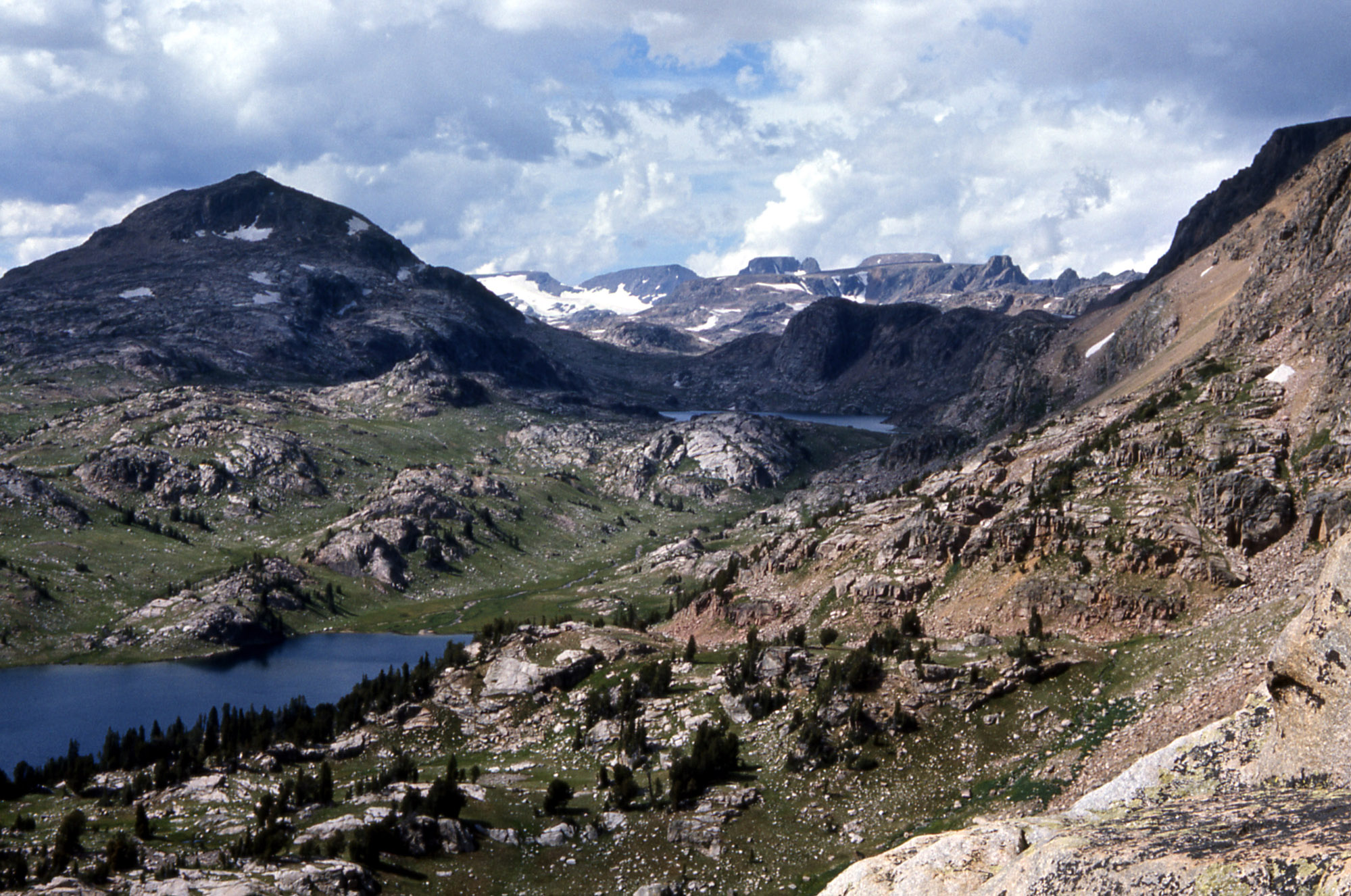

- Location within the United States
- Location: Montana / Wyoming, USA
- Nearest city: Red Lodge, MT
- Coordinates: 45°6′N 109°56′W
- Area: 937,102 acres (3,792.32 km^{2})
- Established: 1978
- Governing body: U.S. Forest Service

Absaroka–Beartooth Wilderness is a 937,102 acres (3,792.32 km^{2}) protected wilderness area on the border of Montana and Wyoming, United States. It was designated by Congress in 1978 and originally comprised 904,500 acres (3,660 km^{2}) in the Custer National Forest and Gallatin National Forest National Forests of Montana. The wilderness area was modified in 1983 through the Lee Metcaff Wilderness and Management Act and in 1984 through the Wyoming Wilderness Act, which added area from the Shoshone National Forest and brought it to its present total.

== Geology ==
The namesake mountains have geologically distinct origins. The Beartooth Mountains are composed of granite, while the Absaroka Range is primarily extrusive volcanic and metamorphic rock. The Absaroka are noted for their dark and craggy appearance, lush and heavily forested valleys, and abundant wildlife. The highest peak in the Absaroka range within the wilderness area is Tumble Mountain at 11,319 feet (3,450 m). The Beartooth Mountains are more alpine, with huge treeless plateaus and home to Montana's high point: Granite Peak (12,807 feet (3,904 m)). They also have the largest unbroken area of land over 10,000 feet (3,000 m) high in the U.S. outside of Alaska. The wilderness has more than 120 peaks over 10,000 feet (3,000 m) and 28 peaks over 12,000 feet (3,700 m).

== Threats ==
The widespread detection of total coliforms, Bacteroides, and E. coli in the water sources of the wilderness area is leading to the question of whether it's because of the increasing human visitation. Visitors to the wilderness are encouraged to purify the water carefully before consumption. The wilderness has imposed some regulations to protect the water source, such as camping and burying human waste within 200 feet (61 m) of lake or stream is prohibited, and waste has to be buried 6 inches (15 cm)-8 inches (20 cm) deep.

== See also ==
- List of U.S. Wilderness Areas
