= Wolf (disambiguation) =

The gray wolf (Canis lupus) is a large canine native to Eurasia and North America. Tens of subspecies of C. lupus are known there.

Wolf or wolves may also refer to:

== Animals ==
Other canids and carnivores known as wolves include:

- African wolf (Canis lupaster)
- Armbruster's wolf (Aenocyon armbrusteri), extinct canine of North America
- Coywolf, a wolf-coyote hybrid
- Dire wolf (Aenocyon dirus), extinct canine of North America
- Edward's wolf (Canis edwardii), extinct canine of North America
- Ethiopian wolf (Canis simensis), also known as Abyssinian wolf
- Falkland Islands wolf (Dusicyon australis), extinct canine of the Falkland Islands
- Hare-eating wolf (Canis lepophagus), extinct canine of North America
- Maned wolf (Chrysocyon brachyurus), a South American canid species
- Mountain wolf or red wolf (Cuon alpinus), better known as dhole or Indian wild dog
- Painted wolf or ornate wolf (Lycaon pictus), better known as the African wild dog
- Prairie wolf (Canis latrans), better known as the coyote
- Red wolf (Canis rufus), an endangered canine of the Southeastern US; by some considered a subspecies of the gray wolf
- Reed wolf (Canis aureus moreoticus), better known as the European jackal, a subspecies of golden jackal
- Rocky Mountain wolf (disambiguation)
- Tasmanian wolf or marsupial wolf (Thylacinus cynocephalus), an extinct Australian mammal
- Tiger wolf (Crocuta crocuta), better known as the spotted hyena
- Timber wolf (disambiguation)
- Tweed wolf or eastern coyote, a variety of coywolf
- Zhoukoudian wolf (Canis variabilis), an extinct canine of Central and East Asia
- Giant otter or river wolf, Pteronura brasiliensis

== Arts and entertainment ==
=== Fictional entities ===
- Wolf (name), including a list of fictional characters known as wolf
- W.O.L.F. (Winter Operational Light Fighting Vehicle), in the G.I. Joe universe

=== Film ===
- The Wolf (1916 film), a Hungarian film
- The Wolf, a 1919 film by James Young
- Wolves (1930 film), starring Charles Laughton
- Wolf (1955 film), a Japanese film
- The Wolves (1956 film), an Italian neorealistic drama starring Silvana Mangano
- The Wolves (1971 film), a Japanese film
- Wolf (1994 film), starring Jack Nicholson
- Wolves (1999 film), a documentary short
- Wolf, a 2008 film by Daniel Alfredson
- The Wolf (2004 film) or El Lobo, a Spanish biographical film by Miguel Courtois
- Wolf (2013 film), a Dutch film by Jim Taihuttu
- Wolves (2014 film), a Canadian action horror film starring Lucas Till
- Wolves (2016 film), an American sports drama starring Michael Shannon
- Wolf (2021 Indian film), a Malayalam thriller by Shaji Azeez
- Wolf (2021 Irish-Polish film), an Irish-Polish drama
- Wolves (2022 film), a Canadian thriller starring Mark Nocent
- Wolfs (film), a 2024 American action thriller
- Wolf (2026 film), a British documentary

=== Music ===
==== Bands ====
- Wolf (band), a Swedish heavy metal band

==== Albums ====
- Wolf (Hugh Cornwell album) (1988)
- Wolf (Trevor Rabin album) (1981)
- Wolf (Tyler, the Creator album), or the title song (2013)
- Wolves (Deadlock album) (2007)
- Wolves (Idiot Pilot album) (2007)
- Wolves (My Latest Novel album) (2006)
- Wolves, an unreleased collab album between Kanye West and Drake (2015)
- Wolves (Rise Against album) (2017)
- Wolves (Story of the Year album) (2017)
- Wolves, an album by Kyle Cook (2018)
- Wolves (Candlebox album) (2021)

==== Songs ====
- "Wolf" (Exo song), 2013
- "Wolf" (Saint Asonia song), 2022
- "Wolves" (Big Sean song) (2020)
- "Wolves" (Kanye West song) (2016)
- "Wolves" (Selena Gomez and Marshmello song) (2017)
- "The Wolves" (song), 2011, by Ben Howard
- "Wolves" (Garbage song) (2021)
- "Wolf", a song by B'z from New Love (2019)
- "Wolf", a song by The Beau Brummels from The Beau Brummels (1975)
- "Wolf", a song by First Aid Kit from The Lion's Roar (2012)
- "Wolf", a song by Highly Suspect from The Boy Who Died Wolf (2016)
- "Wolf", a song by Iced Earth from Horror Show (2001)
- "Wolf", a song by Nash the Slash from Children of the Night (1981)
- "Wolf", a song by Tungevaag & Raaban (2016)
- "Wolf", a song by Veruca Salt from American Thighs (1994)
- "Wolf", a song by Joe Walsh from The Smoker You Drink, the Player You Get (1973)
- "Wolves", a song by Azure Ryder (2020)
- "Wolves", a song by Ryan Adams from 1984 (2014)
- "Wolves", a song by Big Wreck from Albatross (2012)
- "Wolves", a song by Garth Brooks from No Fences (1990)
- "Wolves", a song by Machine Head from The Blackening (2007)
- "Wolves", a song by Europe from Walk the Earth (2017)
- "Wolves", a song by Freya Ridings from Blood Orange (2023)
- "Wolves", a song by the Cat Empire from Rising with the Sun (2016)
- "Wolves", a song by Rise Against from Wolves (2017)
- "Wolves", a song by Scale the Summit from Monument (2007)
- "Wolves", a song by Wu-Tang Clan from 8 Diagrams (2007)
- "Wolves", a song by Maggie Rogers from Notes from the Archive: Recordings 2011-2016 (2020)
- "Wolves (Song of the Shepherd's Dog)", a song by Iron & Wine from The Shepherd's Dog (2007)
- "The Wolf", a song by Chelsea Grin from Eternal Nightmare (2018)
- "The Wolf", a song by Eddie Vedder from Into the Wild (2007)
- "The Wolves", a song by Pharaoh from Bury the Light (2012)
- "The Wolves (Act I and II)", a song by Bon Iver from For Emma, Forever Ago (2007)

=== Television ===
- The Wolf (TV series), a 2020 Chinese television series
- Wolf (British TV series), a 2023 British crime thriller television series set in Wales
- Wolf (American TV series), a 1989 CBS TV-series set in San Francisco
- Wolf (Thai TV series), a 2019 Thai television series
- Wolf (miniseries), a 2018 Turkish-language television miniseries

=== Other uses in arts and entertainment ===
- Wolf (card game), an historic variant of the card game Tippen
- Wolf (novel), a children's novel by Gillian Cross
- Wolf (video game), 1994
- The Wolf, a 1908 play by Eugene Walter
- Wolves (book), a children's book by Emily Gravett
- The Wolves (play), 2016, by Sarah DeLappe
- Lupin III or Wolf 3, a manga and anime series
- Dances With Wolves (novel), by Michael Blake

== Astronomy ==
- Lupus (constellation) or Wolf, a southern constellation
- 14P/Wolf, a periodic comet
- Wolf (crater), a lunar crater

== Businesses and organizations ==
- Wolf Ammunition, a line of ammunition associated with Sporting Supplies International
- Wolf Racing Cars, an Italian racing car manufacturer
- Women's Liberation Front (WoLF), an American non-profit radical feminist organization

== Military ==
- HMS Wolf, 16 ships of the British Royal Navy
- SMS Wolf, an armed merchant raider of the German Imperial Navy in World War I
- Land Rover Wolf, a military utility vehicle in service with UK Armed Forces and the Dutch Marine Corps
- Wolf Armoured Vehicle, an Israeli-produced armored personnel carrier
- Mercedes-Benz G-Class (military designation "Wolf" in the German Bundeswehr )

== People ==
- Wolf (name), a given name and surname, including a list of people and characters with the name
- The Wolves (professional wrestling), or the American Wolves, the tag team of Davey Richards and Eddie Edwards

== Places ==
- Wolf, California, US
- Wolf, Kansas, US
- Wolf, Minnesota, US
- Wolf, Ohio, US
- Wolf, Oklahoma, US
- Wolf, Wyoming, US
- Wolf Township, Pennsylvania, US
- Wolf (river), in Baden-Württemberg, Germany
- The Wolves (Bristol Channel), two rocks in the Bristol Channel, UK
- The Wolves (New Brunswick), undeveloped islands in New Brunswick, Canada
- Volcán Wolf, a volcano in the Galápagos Islands, Ecuador

== Radio and television stations ==
- WOLF (AM), a radio station (1490 AM) licensed to Syracuse, New York, US
- WOLF-FM, a radio station (92.1 FM) licensed to Baldwinsville, New York, US
- WOLF-TV, a television station (channel 22, virtual 56) licensed to Hazleton, Pennsylvania, US

== Sports teams ==
=== Australia ===
- Brisbane Wolves FC, an Australian soccer team
- Wollongong Wolves FC, an Australian rules football team
- Western Wolves FC, an Australian rules football team
- Windsor Wolves, an Australian rugby team

=== Canada ===
- Akwesasne Wolves, a hockey team
- La Tuque Wolves, a hockey team
- Ottawa Wolves, a rugby team
- Ripley Wolves, a hockey team
- St. Catharines Wolves, a soccer team
- Shelburne Wolves, a hockey team
- Sudbury Wolves, a team in the Ontario Hockey League
- Sudbury Jr. Wolves, former name of the Rayside-Balfour Canadians, a team in the Northern Ontario Junior Hockey League
- Sudbury Wolves (EPHL), a defunct team in the Eastern Professional Hockey League
- Lakehead Thunderwolves, athletic program of lakehead University

=== United Kingdom ===
- Edinburgh Wolves, a Scottish American Football team
- Warrington Wolves, an English rugby league team
- Wolverhampton Wanderers F.C., an English football team commonly known as "Wolves"
- Wolverhampton Wolves, an English Speedway team
- Worcester Wolves, a British basketball team

=== United States ===
- Carolina Raging Wolves, a football team
- Chicago Wolves, a minor league ice hockey team
- Connecticut Wolves, a soccer team
- Detroit Wolves, a baseball team
- Idaho Wolves, a soccer team
- Los Angeles Wolves, a former professional soccer team
- Manchester Wolves, a minor league arena football team
- Stockton Wolves, an arena football team
- Wisconsin Wolves, a football team

=== Elsewhere ===
- EHL Wolves, a Swiss ice hockey team
- Faisalabad Wolves, a Pakistani cricket team
- La Louvière Wolves, a Belgian American football team
- Tangerang Wolves F.C., an Indonesian football team
- VfL Wolfsburg or the Wolves (in German, Die Wölfe), a German football club
- Warri Wolves F.C., a Nigerian soccer team
- Wayamba Wolves, a Sri Lankan cricket team

== Other uses ==
- Wolf (horse), a Chilean racehorse
- Wolf (train), a South Devon Railway Eagle class 4-4-0ST steam locomotive
- Wolf Prize, a science and art award
- WOLF, the ".wol" file extension used for eBooks on the Hanlin eReader

== See also ==
- Dances with Wolves, a 1990 American film
- Dances with Wolves (soundtrack)
- The Wolf (disambiguation)
- Wolfs (disambiguation)
- Wolf Brigade (disambiguation)
- Wolfe (disambiguation)
- Wolff (disambiguation)
- Woolf, Virginia
- Woolfe: The Red Hood Diaries, a video game
- Wolof (disambiguation)
- WOLV (disambiguation)
- Wulf (disambiguation)
  - Beowulf and Wulf and Eadwacer, Old English epic poems
- "WOFF", a 2020 song by Baby Alice
