= Orana Wildlife Park =

- Orana Wildlife Park Logo
- Interactive map of Orana Wildlife Park
- 43.4675°S 172.4625°E
- Date opened: 25 September 1976
- Location: Christchurch, New Zealand
- Land area: 80 ha
- No. of animals: 1000+
- No. of species: 40+
- Memberships: ZAA
- Website: oranawildlifepark.co.nz

Orana Wildlife Park is New Zealand's only open-range zoo, sitting on 80 hectares of land, located on the outskirts of Christchurch. It opened on 25 September 1976, and is owned and operated by the Orana Wildlife Trust, a registered charity. The aims of the Trust are to provide quality recreational opportunities for local people and visitors to Christchurch; conserve endangered native and exotic wildlife; educate visitors (especially children) about environmental and conservation issues; and support research relating to endangered animals.

In 2013 the park suffered a number of setbacks, including an ape escape, snowstorms and wind damage, and was forced to close its doors for 10 days.

In 2015 Orana became home to New Zealand's only gorillas, with three males, including a silverback arriving at the park.

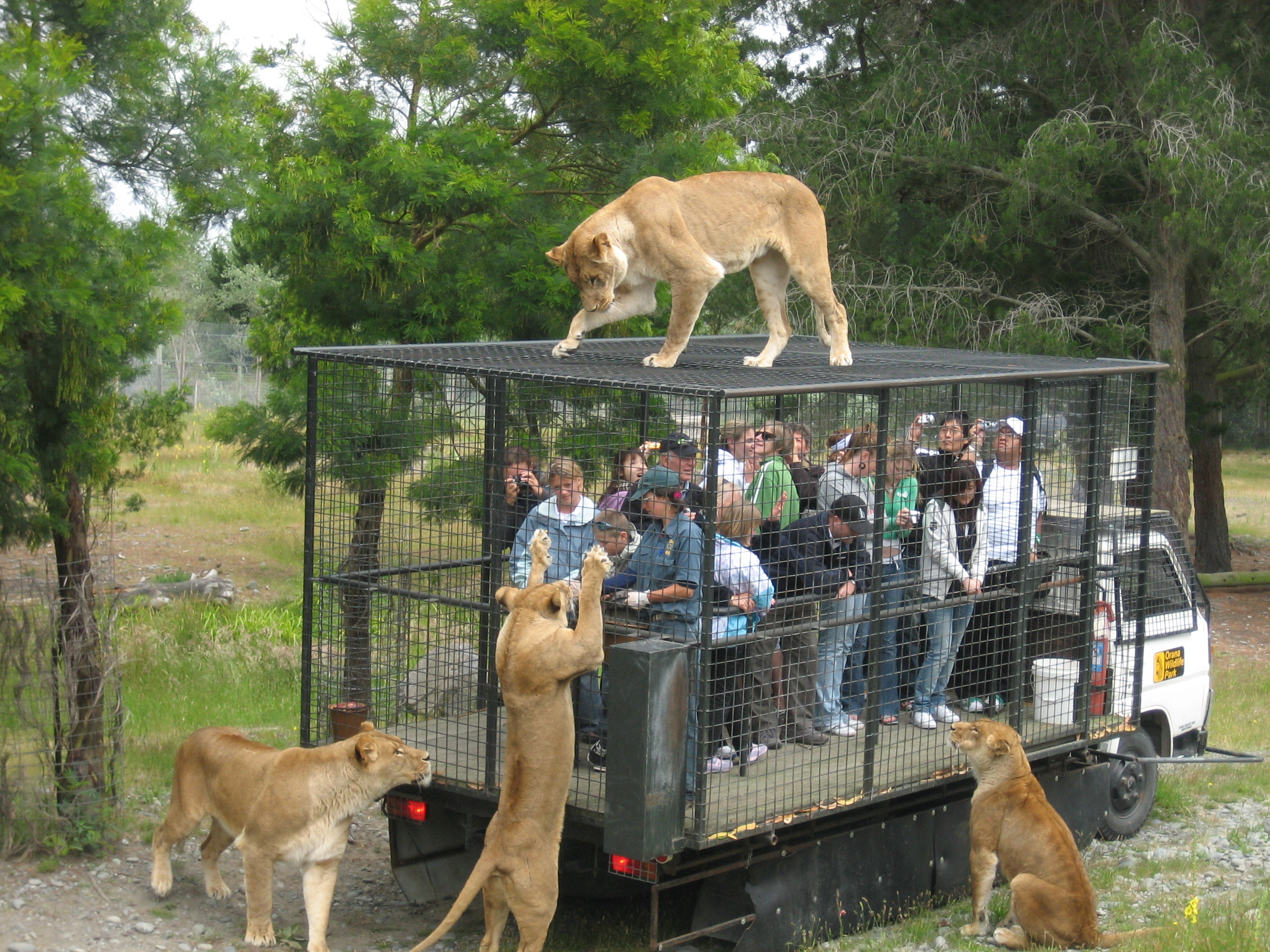
Feeding lions at Orana Wildlife Park.

== History and Major Events ==
=== 1970–1975 ===
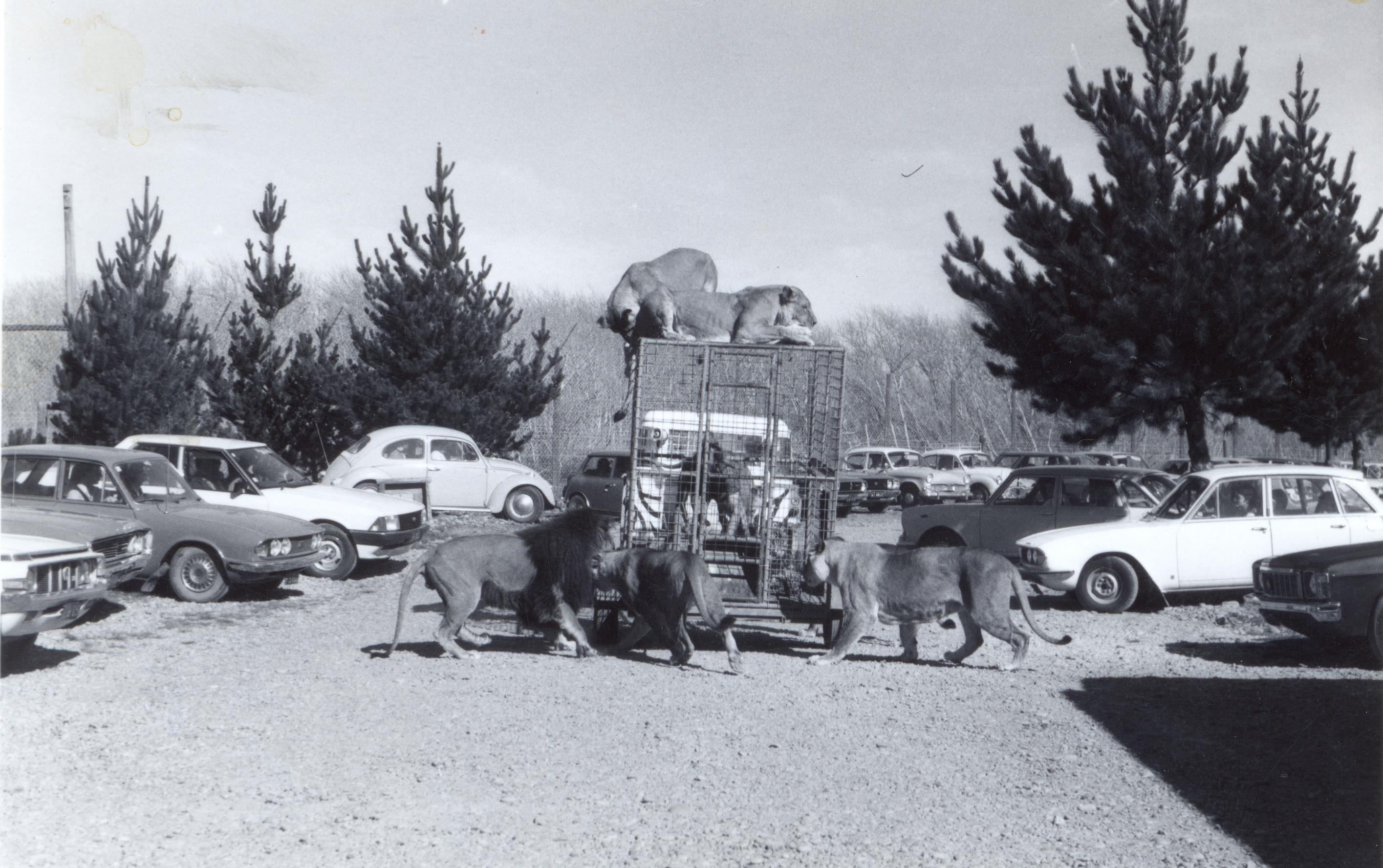
Drive-through Lion Reserve at Orana Wildlife Park.

The South Island Zoological Society was formed in 1970.

On 10 September 1976, Orana's first animals arrived from Australia, including 18 lions, 2 tiger cubs, 2 camels and 2 water buffalo. Orana Park (now Orana Wildlife Park) officially opened on 25 September 1976.

=== 1976–1985 ===
The park opened with 28 animals from six species. During the first ten years of operation, new animals were regularly added and Stage One of the African Plains, a major expansion, was completed.

Upon opening, Orana's main drawcard was the drive-through Lion Reserve, the first and only one of its type in New Zealand. The drive-through Lion Reserve operated from 1976 until 1995. Today, Orana operates a "Lion Encounter" and the experience is an 'historical nod' to the drive-through days.

In 1977, timber wolves arrived and the Farmyard was also created. Wolves were a visitor favourite for many years and the interactive Farmyard continues to be popular. In 1978, an island home was created for spider monkeys, the zoo's first species of primate.

Two pairs of rare Scimitar-horned oryx were transferred in 1979. Oryx were declared extinct in the wild in 1984 but captive breeding programmes resulted in the species being re-established in protected areas. Orana was the first institution in the world to breed oryx by artificial insemination and over 80 oryx have been bred at the zoo.

In 1981 Stage One of the African Plains opened. This meant that visitors could view African savannah species, such as zebra and oryx, across water moats.

Giraffes were added in 1982. Orana has contributed to the managed zoo-based programme and over 15 giraffes have been bred, most of which were transferred to other zoos.

The South Island's first kiwi house was created in 1984. Today, Orana plays an important role in the captive component of the recovery programme. Over 20 kiwi from Orana have been released to the wild and chicks have also been transferred to other captive centres.

=== 1986–1995 ===
Orana's second decade of operation resulted in the steady arrival of new species and ongoing development. The direction of the zoo significantly altered with the closing of the drive-through Lion Reserve in 1995.

White rhinoceros were transferred to Orana in 1986. The addition of tuatara in 1987 commenced a focus on native reptiles that continued the following year with the creation of a new Reptile House.

The Park continued to expand with the opening of Stage Two of the African Plains in 1988. This expansion included a new Giraffe House. In 1990, a restaurant was added that has since turned into a Function Centre.

Cheetahs arrived at Orana in 1988 and since that time Orana has been involved in a zoo-based breeding programme. Cheetah have become one of Orana's flagship conservation species and over 24 cats have been raised to adulthood. In 1991, a 'Cheetah Chase' was introduced. This public presentation gave visitors the opportunity to witness the speed of cheetah.

One of the most popular additions to the zoo occurred in 1991 with the arrival of meerkats. Due to a Telecom advertising campaign featuring these animals, visitation for the exhibit opening was one of the biggest days on record. These animals moved into a new exhibit named Kopje Rock which now also features porcupines. Orana has regularly bred meerkats.

A walk-through native bird aviary, complete with waterfall, was opened in 1994. This was built by the South Island Zoological Society. The aviary is home to a wide range of forest birds such as tūī, kererū, kākāriki and bellbird.

A significant shift in direction occurred in 1995. The present administration building, and large carpark, was opened. This resulted in the entrance of the zoo moving to middle of the Park. Visitors could no longer drive their cars through Orana. Rather, they walked or utilised a safari shuttle (first introduced in 1986). Scheduled animal feeds occur throughout the day, helping to break up the walking distance for visitors.

Closing the Park to cars also meant the drive-through Lion Reserve ended. The lion pride was relocated to a new habitat close to the new office building. Later, they were moved back to their current location.

=== 1996–2005 ===
Some significant changes took place including new experiences, the creation of a formal education programme and the acquisition of another attraction.

In 1996 New Zealand whio (blue duck) were added. Whio have become one of the Park's most important conservation species. Orana has regularly bred these highly threatened native birds for release to the wild, in various locations in the North Island.

African wild dogs arrived in 1998. These animals are one of the most threatened African carnivores. Initially Orana held a group of three males and then a pack of seven females.

In 1999, two new animal encounters were added.

Ibutho, New Zealand's first ever rhino calf, was born at Orana in 1999. This was a significant achievement as the reproductive rate of captive born rhinos in zoos is very low. To date, three rhino calves have been bred at Orana (the others in 2010 and 2014).

In 2000, Orana took over the operation of Southern Encounter Aquarium in Cathedral Square, central Christchurch. A kiwi house was added in 2002. The facility was lost in the 2011 Christchurch earthquake.

Asian small clawed otters arrived in 2000. A new habitat, near the meerkats, was created for them. Brown teal, a threatened native species, were added in 2004 and have become a key conservation focus. Pateke ducklings reared at Orana have regularly been released to the wild. The singing Siamang gibbons, Orana's first species of ape, were added in 2004 and three young ones have been raised.

=== 2006–2013 ===
The return of tigers, a new kea aviary and another zoo to operate were changes. However, earthquakes and storms caused significant damage.

A 6,000 square metre habitat for the critically endangered Sumatran tiger was completed in 2006 and Orana joined 21st Century Tiger. Orana's previous tigers died in 1999.

In October 2008, Orana took over the operation of Nelson's Natureland Zoo. The facility was due to close earlier that year. In December 2008, a new meerkat exhibit was created and a porcupine habitat opened in December 2010. Orana announced in 2012 that they were looking for new owners for Natureland because of financial difficulties; they sold it in 2013.

A walk-through kea habitat opened in 2009. The habitat simulates a regenerating beech forest. Visitors walk along a board-walk and exit through a musterer's hut, the main interpretation hub for the habitat. Four kea chicks have been bred in the aviary.

From 2010 until 2013, the zoo was closed for over 40 days, on nine separate occasions. Orana reopened after the devastating Christchurch earthquakes of 2010 and 2011 with little physical damage. The main impact of the earthquakes was significantly reduced visitation/income as typically 45% of the Park's visitors are from outside of Christchurch.

Orana suffered from a range of further damaging events. These included two floods, three major snow storms causing extensive exhibit damage including a power spike that blew many of the Park's switch boards. Additionally, four gale-force wind events occurred, the most significant of which happened in September 2013 when a severe gale wreaked havoc across Christchurch. This event left the zoo without power, water and communications for 8 days and closed to the public for 10 days. Despite the setbacks, visitor numbers progressively started to recover to pre-quake levels and staff set about creating significant new additions.

In 2013 three gibbons escaped from their enclosure and were recaptured within an hour.

=== 2014–2020 ===
The most significant development was the creation of a Great Ape Centre for New Zealand's only gorillas.

In 2014 a cheetah cub escaped from its enclosure and was captured within about 10 minutes.

Gypsy horses arrived in 2014. An outreach partnership was formed with Gypsy Royal Stud where Orana's horses are managed as part of the Stud's programme. The horses' arrival started a shift to rare/interesting breeds of domestic stock in the Farmyard.

Orana opened New Zealand's biggest Tasmanian devil habitat in December 2014. The Park joined the Save the Tasmanian Devil Programme.

On 30 July 2015, the park opened the Great Ape Centre at the time it housed 3 gorillas Fataki, Fuzu and Mahali.

=== 2021- ===
On 31 December 2021 the Zoo announced that it is planning on building a $1.4M White Rhino Conservation Centre.

A 2024 investigation by 1News detailed a number of animal deaths at Orana, and zookeepers alleged instances of understaffing and mismanagement.

== Conservation ==
Orana is a member of the World Association of Zoos and Aquariums (WAZA), the Zoo Aquarium Association of Australasia (ZAA) and ZAA NZ. Through these memberships, Orana participates in managed breeding programmes for the species they hold.
