= Wolff (disambiguation) =

Wolff is a surname.

Wolff may also refer to:

- Wolff, Indiana, U.S.
- Rudolf Wolff & Co., commodity broker
- Wolff Olins, brand consultancy agency
- Nelson W. Wolff Municipal Stadium, ballpark in San Antonio, Texas

== See also ==
- Wolf (disambiguation)
