= The Wolf =

"The Wolf" may refer to:

== People ==
- John the Wolf, stage name of Canadian musician Jean Leloup
- The Wolf, nickname for professional sumo wrestler Chiyonofuji

== Film and television ==
- The Wolf (1914 film), an American film directed by Barry O'Neil
- The Wolf (1916 film), a Hungarian film directed by Michael Curtiz
- The Wolf (1949 film), a French drama film directed by Guillaume Radot
- The Wolf (2004 film), a film directed by Miguel Courtois
- The Wolf (TV series), a 2019 Chinese TV series

== Music ==
- The Wolf (Andrew W.K. album)
- The Wolf (Shooter Jennings album)
- "The Wolf" (Mumford & Sons song)
- "The Wolf", a song by Billy Talent from Crisis of Faith
- "The Wolf", a song by The Banner from Frailty
- "The Wolf", a song by Motörhead from Rock 'n' Roll
- "The Wolf", a song by Fever Ray
- "The Wolf", a song by Eddie Vedder from Into the Wild
- "The Wolf", a song by Phildel from The Disappearance of the Girl
- "The Wolf", a song by Swans from The Seer

== Books and magazines ==
- The Wolf (magazine), an independent literary magazine based in the UK
- The Wolf (picture book), a 1991 picture book by Margaret Barbalet and Jane Tanner

== Radio stations ==
=== Canada ===
- CKWF-FM (The Wolf), in Peterborough, Ontario
- CFWF-FM (The Wolf), in Regina, Saskatchewan

=== United States ===
- KFFF (FM) (99.3 The Wolf), in Bennington, Nebraska, serving the Omaha market
- KWOF (FM) (106.3 The Wolf), in Waukomis, Oklahoma
- KWJJ-FM (99.5 The Wolf), in Portland Oregon
- WDAF-FM (106.5 The Wolf), in Kansas City, Missouri
- WBQQ (99.3 The Wolf), in Kennebunk, Maine, simulcast of WTHT
- WTHT (99.9 The Wolf), in Auburn, Maine
- WXLF (95.3 and 107.1 The Wolf), in Hartford, Vermont
- WZLF (95.3 and 107.1 The Wolf), in Bellows Falls, Vermont, simulcast of WXLF
- WLKK (107.7 and 104.7 The Wolf), licensed to Wethersfield, New York

=== United Kingdom ===
- 107.7 The Wolf, in Wolverhampton, England

=== New Zealand ===
- The Wolf (radio network), a defunct nationwide radio network

== See also ==
- Wolf (disambiguation)
