= Wolf Mountain (disambiguation) =

Wolf Mountain, formerly Nordic Valley, is a ski area in Utah, United States.

Wolf Mountain may also refer to:

- Wolf Mountain (Montana), a mountain summit in Park County, Montana, US
- Wolf Mountains, a mountain range in Big Horn County, Montana, US
- Kurd Mountain, between Syria and Turkey, the Turkish part renamed Kurt Dağı ('Wolf Mountain')

== See also ==
- Wolf Mountain Shale, a geologic formation in Texas, US
- Wolf Mountains Battlefield, Montana, US
- Battle of Wolf Mountain, in Montana in 1877
- Mount Wolf, Pennsylvania, US
- Mountain wolf (disambiguation)
- Little Wolf Mountains, in Montana, US
- Lone Wolf Mountain, in British Columbia, Canada
- Mad Wolf Mountain, in Montana, US
- White Wolf Mountain, in California, US
