= Freddie Wolff =

British athlete (1910–1988)

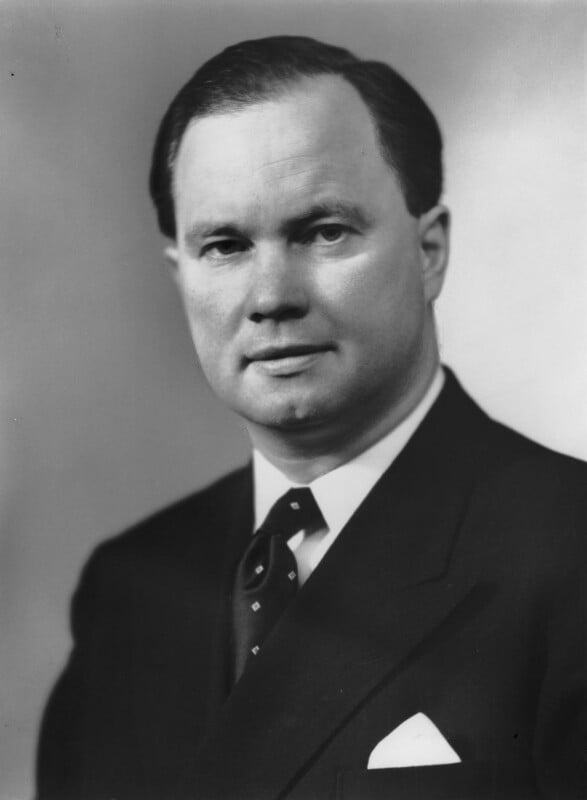
- Wolff in 1952
- Born: 13 October 1910; British Hong Kong
- Died: 26 January 1988 (aged 77); Marylebone, London, U.K.
- Education: Beaumont College
- Occupation: Athlete
- Known for: Gold Medal Olympian
- Spouse: Natalie Winefred Virginia Byrne
- Children: 5

Medal record

Men's athletics

Representing Great Britain

Olympic Games
Gold medal – first place	1936 Berlin	4 × 400 m relay

Frederick Ferdinand Wolff, CBE, TD (13 October 1910 – 26 January 1988) was a British athlete, winner of gold medal in 4 × 400 m relay at the 1936 Summer Olympics.

== Early life ==
On 13 October 1910, Wolff was born in British Hong Kong, the eldest son of a family of four children. Wolff was a member of the Kowloon Cricket Club, where he won his first race in 1919.

Wolff and his family returned to England. Wolff attended Shirley House Preparatory School and Beaumont College in Windsor, England.

== Career ==
Wolff became the national 440 yards champion after winning the British AAA Championships title at the 1933 AAA Championships.

At the 1936 Berlin Olympic Games, Wolff ran the opening leg in the British 4 × 400 m relay team, which won the gold medal with a new European record of 3:09.0.

In 1929, Wolff joined the family firm Rudolf Wolff & Co. In the Second World War, Wolff served in the Oxfordshire and Buckinghamshire Light Infantry and was promoted to the rank of captain. Wolff rejoined Rudolf Wolff & Co. in 1946, and became a partner in 1951.

From 1970 to 1977 Wolff became the Committee Chairman of the London Metal Exchange helping establishing the LME's international reputation. He was made a CBE in 1975.

Wolff was the chairman of the Handicapped Children's Pilgrimage Trust.

== Personal life ==
Wolff married Natalie Winefred Virginia Byrne, the daughter of Ferdinand and Mary (née Keith) Byrne. Wolff had five children: Jennifer, John, Carolyn, Richard (twin) and Christine (twin).

Also 22 Grandchildren: Michael, Philippa, Michele, Clare, Natalie, Timothy, Madeleine, Catherine, Paul, Anna, Suzie, Mark, Christianne, Lucinda, Fred, John, Nikki, Monica, Sebastian, Andrew, Luke, Marie-Francoise.

On 26 January 1988, Wolff died in Marylebone, London, United Kingdom. He was 77. The British Olympic Association held a reception at the Buckingham Palace for all surviving British Olympic medalists on the day he died.

In 2015, Wolff's great-grandson Daniel Wolff competed in the 2015 Special Olympics World Summer Games in Los Angeles. His disability was autism.
