= Wolfs =

Wolfs may refer to:

- Wolfs (film), a 2024 American film
- Wolfs (surname)

== See also ==
- Wolf, an animal
