= Rocky Mountain wolf =

Rocky Mountain wolf may refer to:

- Gray wolf (Canis lupus) found in the Rocky Mountains
- Northern Rocky Mountain wolf (Canis lupus irremotus)
- Southern Rocky Mountain wolf (Canis lupus youngi)

== See also ==
- Mountain wolf or Dhole
- Mountain wolf (disambiguation)
- Rocky Mountain (disambiguation)
- Wolf (disambiguation)
