= École hôtelière de Lausanne =

Swiss hospitality industry-focused university

EHL Hospitality Business School
- EHL Hospitality Business School (École hôtelière de Lausanne) (lit. Hotel School of Lausanne)
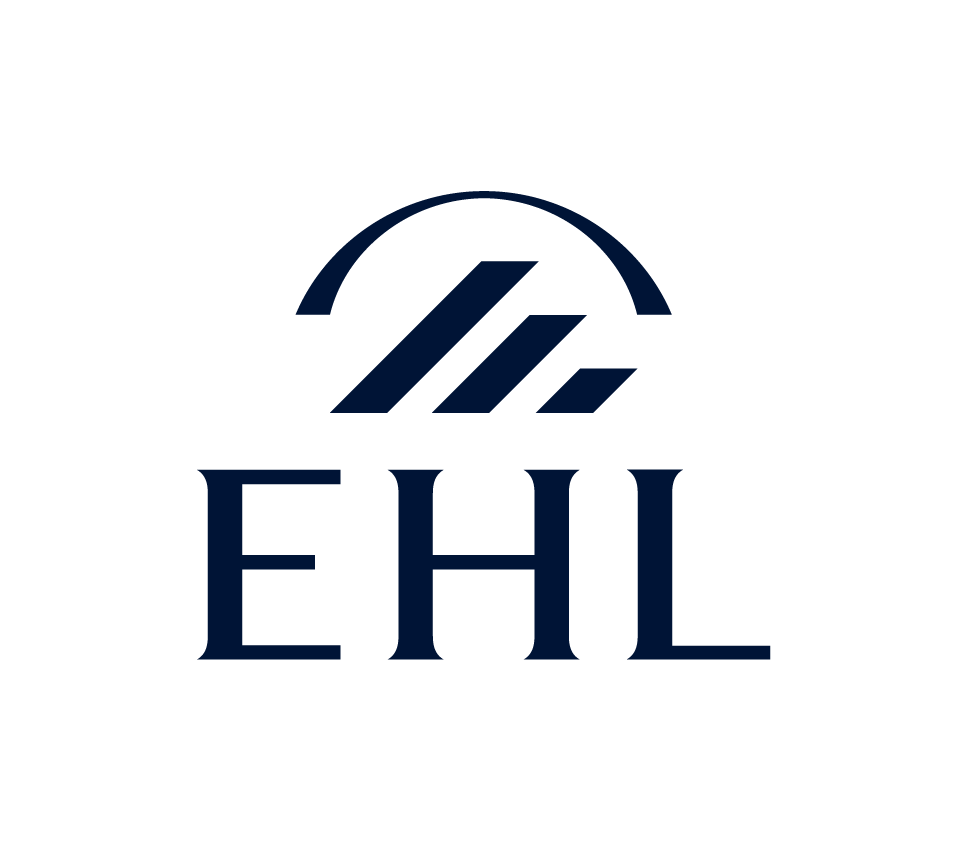
- Other name: EHL
- Accreditation: NECHE; AACSB member EFMD
- President: Markus Venzin
- Dean: Achim Schmitt
- Students: 3318
- Location: Lausanne, Switzerland; 46°33′38″N 6°40′57″E
- Colours: Blue, white, & gold
- Website: ehl.edu

EHL Hospitality Business School, also known as École hôtelière de Lausanne, is a hospitality management school in Switzerland. The school is often seen as one of the best of its kind in the world, training its students to obtain managerial careers in the hotel and hospitality industries.

Its campus is located in Le Chalet-à-Gobet, near the city center of Lausanne. The school currently teaches more than 3,300 students from 123 different countries.

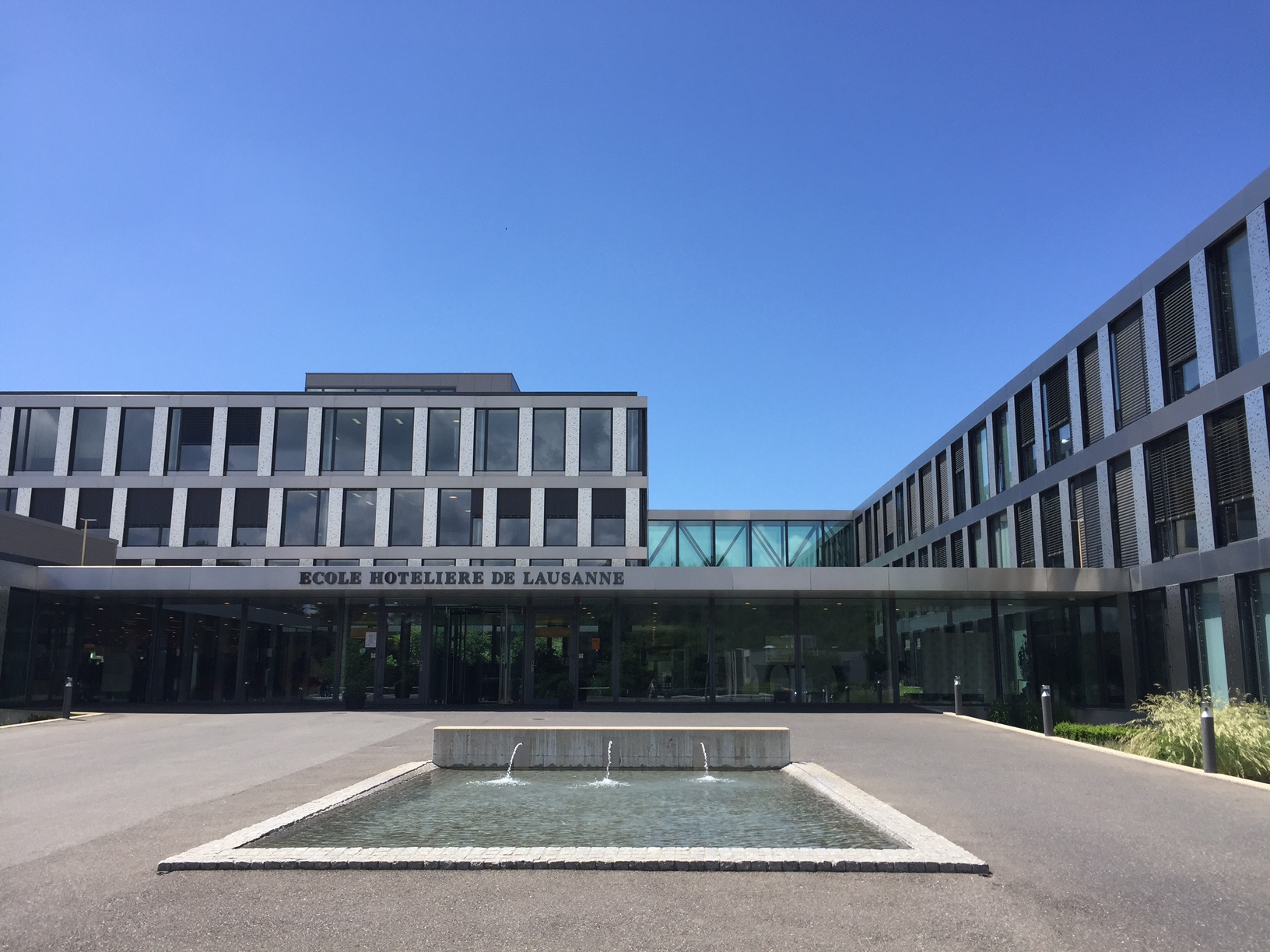
Main entrance

== History ==
Founded in 1893 by Jacques Tschumi, École hôtelière de Lausanne is the oldest hotel school in the world. It opened during the tourism boom in Switzerland in the late 19th century in response to high demand for skilled and qualified personnel.

In 1994, EHL launched its new Bachelor of Science in International Hospitality Management.

In 2001, EHL launched an EMBA (Executive Master in Hospitality Administration) program, a graduate degree in hospitality management from the University of Applied Sciences and Arts of Western Switzerland (HES-SO).

== Education ==
It prepares students for senior international positions in the field through five programs:

- The Bachelor of Science in International Hospitality Management (taught in English or French), which includes a preparatory year of immersion into the hospitality industry, three years of coursework studying business management topics, two six-month internships (often taken abroad), and a 10-week consulting mandate
- The Master of Science in Global Hospitality Business, a three-semester program in partnership with the Hong Kong Polytechnic University and the University of Houston, with courses taught in Lausanne (Switzerland), Hong Kong (China) and Houston (United States)
- The MBA in Hospitality, delivered 80% online starting September 2017
- The Executive MBA in Hospitality Administration, a 12-month post-graduate program in hotel and hospitality management
- The Master Class in Culinary Arts, a six-month certificate focused on the advanced aspects of culinary arts such as international cuisine, gastronomy and baking

EHL offers financial support to talented students who are unable to enroll due to financial hardship.

== Campus ==
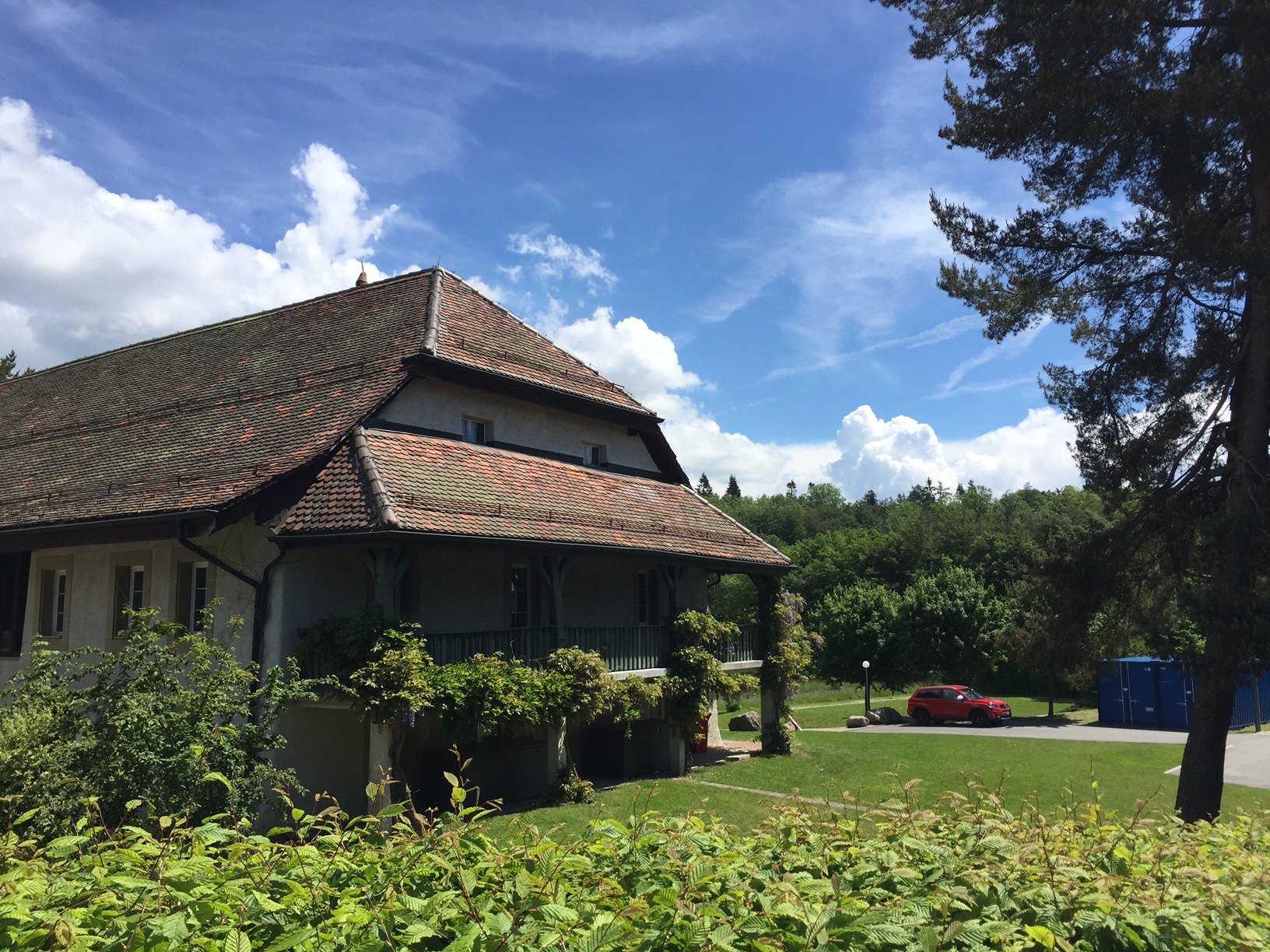
La Ferme building

The EHL campus contains several training restaurants for students in the preparatory year, including the Berceau des Sens, a gourmet restaurant that is open to the public and recognized by the Gault Millau guide. In 2019, the restaurant was awarded One Michelin Star. It also has several bars, 48 classrooms, auditoriums, a library, study rooms, a wine tasting room, a cafeteria, a boutique, a historic building, sports areas, and dorms.

EHL has adopted several sustainability initiatives, including a waste management system, vegetable garden, heat recovery system for cold storage, solar panels, and two electric cars on campus.

In 2013, EHL launched a project to further develop its campus through a collaborative exchange of ideas involving 385 architecture and landscape design students from around the world. Preparatory work should start in the fall of 2016, and should end within four years. The cost of the project is estimated at 226 million Swiss francs.

== Accreditations ==
Ecole hôtelière de Lausanne is accredited as an Institution of Higher Education, issued by the New England Association of Schools and Colleges (NEASC, USA). This accreditation ensures that the institution meets the international standards of higher education, and facilitates credit transfers and degree recognition from American institutions.

Within Switzerland, it is the only hospitality school offering training affiliated with the University of Applied Sciences and Arts of Western Switzerland (HES-SO), attesting to the high teaching quality and allowing the issued qualifications to be protected by Swiss law.

The Executive MBA in Hospitality Administration program was recognized by the Swiss Center of Accreditation and Quality Assurance in Higher Education (AAQ) as meeting their quality standards.

== Rankings ==
Based on a study done by TNS Sofres in 2007, 2010 and 2013 with managers and recruiters from the hospitality world, EHL is considered to be the best in the world with regard to graduate job placement in international hospitality careers.

In 2013 and 2014, EHL was named the Best Hospitality Management School in the international competition of the Worldwide Hospitality Awards.

In 2019 EHL was ranked No.1 Worldwide by QS World University Rankings (Hospitality and Leisure Management category).

== Faculty and research ==
Since 2014, the EHL research center, in partnership with STR, aims to become a premier source of research in the field of international hospitality. The EHL Food & Beverage Chair, supported by the food production and marketing group Saviva, has studied the changes and challenges of the restaurant industry market since 2010. The METRO Innovation Chair is dedicated to research and innovation in the hospitality and restaurant field.

Many gastronomy experts are part of the school's faculty, including several Meilleurs Ouvriers de France (MOF).

== Collaboration with industry ==
A Business Incubator was established in 2012 to support start-ups who want to start in the hospitality sector.

EHL has established an International Advisory Board composed of international leaders in the hospitality and education sector, which provides the school with an opportunity to benefit from direct feedback and experiences from the industry. In November 2013, EHL acquired the Swiss School of Tourism and Hospitality (SSTH) at Passugg, Switzerland, which teaches tourism, gastronomy and hospitality.

== Gallery ==
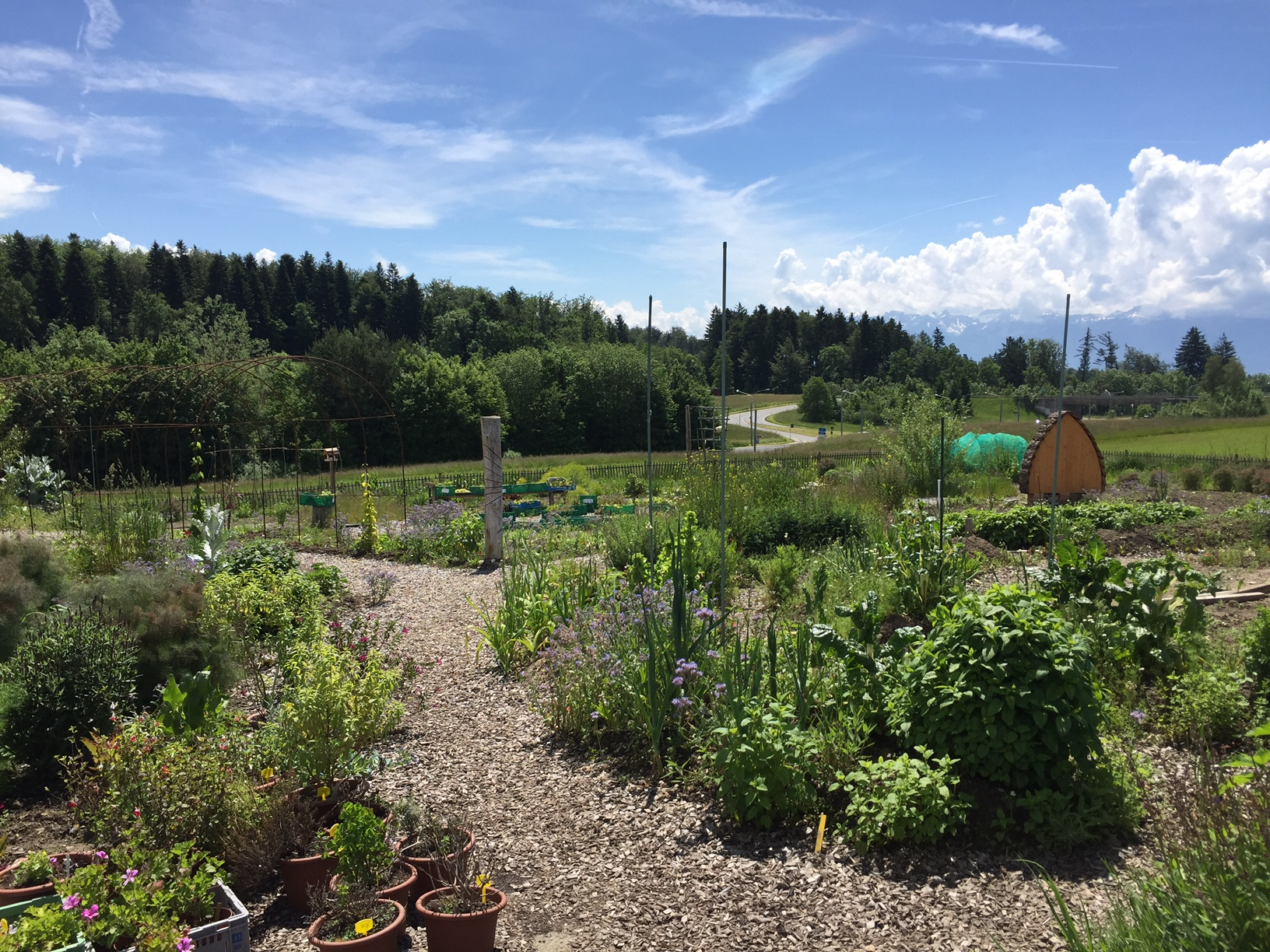
Vegetable Garden

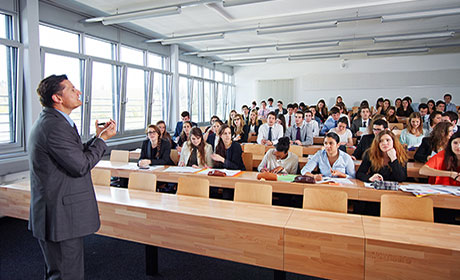
Classroom

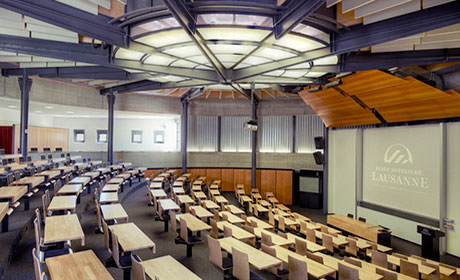
Auditorium Tschumi

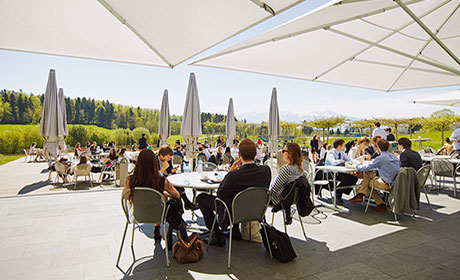
Terrace view

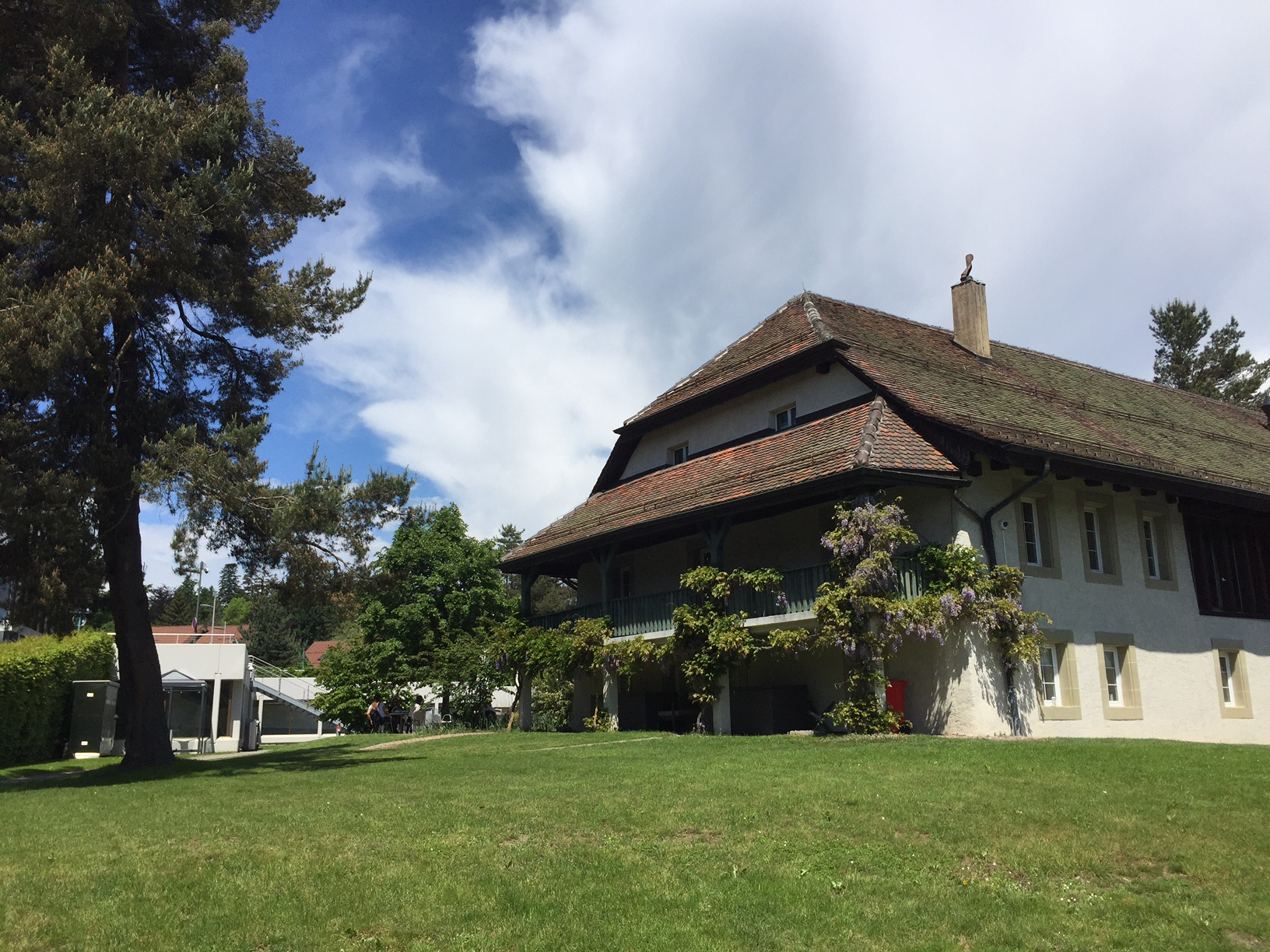
Garden & La Ferme building

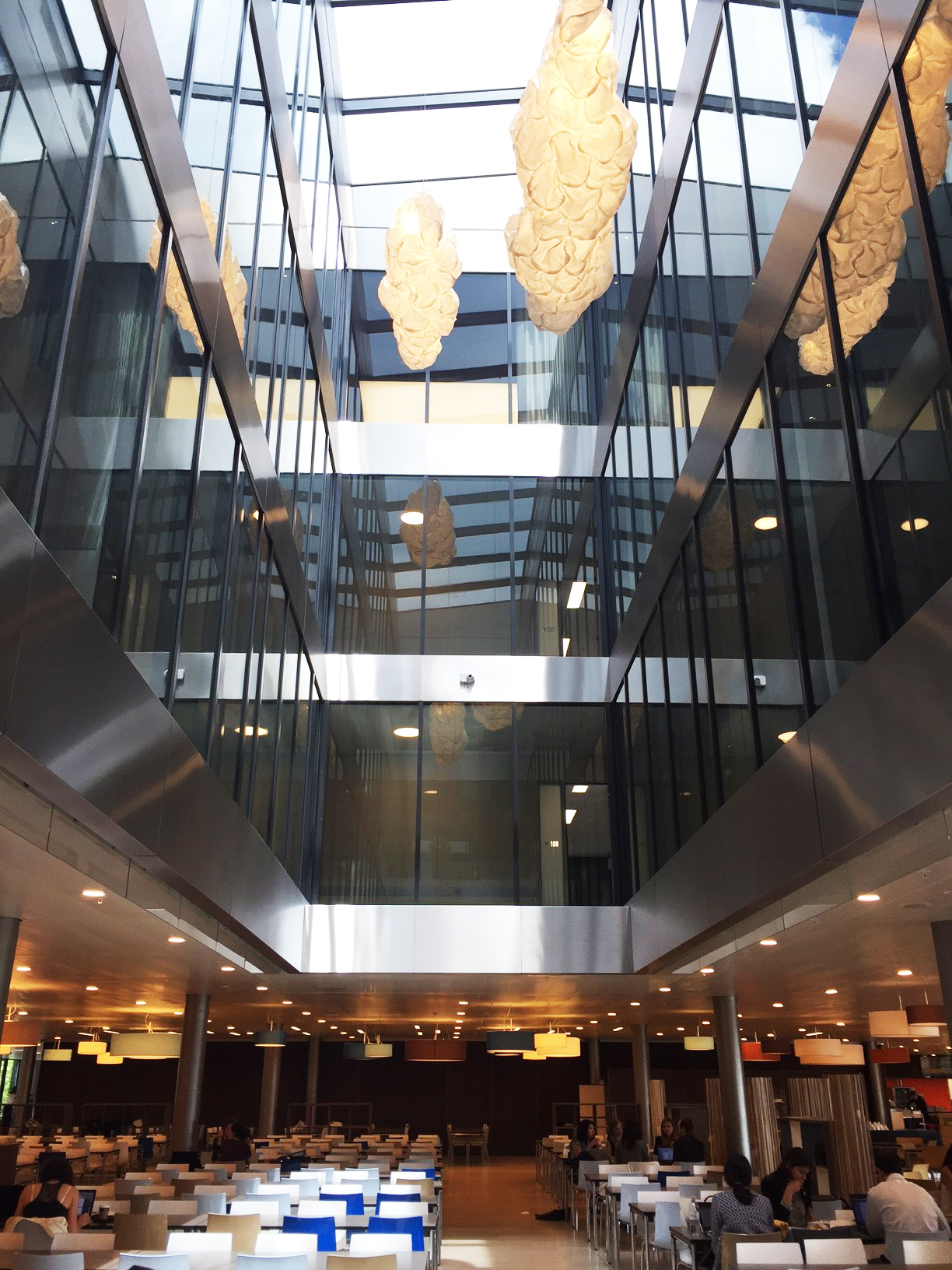
Food Court

== See also ==
- EHL Wolves
- List of largest universities by enrollment in Switzerland
- List of Hospitality Management Schools in Switzerland
