= Deaths and Entrances (album) =

Studio album by My Latest Novel
- Released: 18 May 2009
- Recorded: Chem 19 Studios
- Genre: Indie rock, Indie folk
- Label: Bella Union
- Producer: Andy Miller

My Latest Novel chronology
Wolves (2006)	Deaths and Entrances (2009)

Deaths and Entrances is the second studio album by Scottish indie rock band My Latest Novel, released on 18 May 2009 on Bella Union. The album is named after a Dylan Thomas poem of the same name. Regarding the album's title, the band state:

It’s just a grand title for an album – it gave us something to work towards, expressed much of the sentiment behind what we wanted to do after we’d done with Wolves. The record is brave and ambitious and the title is just that – so we had to write songs that backed that up. I was delighted by the “pulling thunderbolts to shut the sun” bit. It sort of sums up what we were trying to do.

== Background ==
According to the band:

We were touring Wolves for about 18 months, and then it took a while before we could regather and start recording again. We ended up holed up in an old pub in Greenock, where we come from. The thing was, we didn’t really feel under any pressure to rush something out. You know, we didn’t want to go and put any old rubbish out, so we just took our time. and we’re delighted with the new record.

== Track listing ==
1. "All In All In All Is All"
2. "Dragonhide"
3. "Lacklustre"
4. "I Declare a Ceasefire"
5. "A Dear Green Place"
6. "Argument Against the Man"
7. "Man Against the Argument"
8. "If the Accident Will"
9. "Hopelessly Endlessly"
10. "Re-Appropriation of the Meme"
11. "The Greatest Shakedown"

== Personnel ==
- Andy Miller - producer, engineer
- Kenny McLeod - mastering
- Michelle Blade - cover artwork
- Paul McGeachy - inner artwork, layout
- Gary Deveny - inner artwork, layout
- Ryan King - inner artwork, layout
