= Wolf Glacier =

Glacier in Montana, United States

- Location within Montana
- Type: Mountain glacier
- Location: Beartooth Mountains, Park County, Montana, U.S.
- Coordinates: 45°09′00″N 109°54′22″W
- Area: Approximately 80 acres (0.32 km^{2})
- Terminus: Barren rock
- Status: Unknown

Wolf Glacier is in the U.S. state of Montana. The glacier is situated in the Beartooth Mountains at an elevation of 11,000 feet (3,400 m) in a north facing cirque to the east of Wolf Mountain. The glacier covers approximately 80 acres (0.32 km^{2}) and several small proglacial lakes are near the glacier terminus.

== See also ==
- List of glaciers in the United States
