= Wolfs (surname) =

Wolfs is a surname. Notable people with the surname include:

- Mike Wolfs (born 1970), Canadian sailor
- Noémie Wolfs (born 1988), Belgian singer
- Sofie Wolfs (born 1981), Belgian swimmer

== See also ==
- Wolf (disambiguation)
