= Mountain wolf (disambiguation) =

The Dhole or mountain wolf (Cuon alpinus) is a canid species native to Asia.

Mountain wolf may also refer to:

- Northern Rocky Mountain wolf (Canis lupus irremotus)
- Southern Rocky Mountain wolf (Canis lupus youngi)
- Cascade mountain wolf (Canis lupus fuscus)
- Mogollon mountain wolf (Canis lupus mogollonensis), an extinct subspecies of gray wolf

== See also ==
- Wolf Mountain (disambiguation)
- Rocky Mountain wolf (disambiguation)
