= WOLV =

WOLV may refer to:

- WOLV (FM), a radio station (97.7 FM) licensed to serve Houghton, Michigan, United States
- WOLV Records, a Dutch independent house record label
- WOLV-TV, the student station of the University of Michigan

== See also ==
- Wolf (disambiguation)
- Wolves (disambiguation)
