= My Latest Novel =

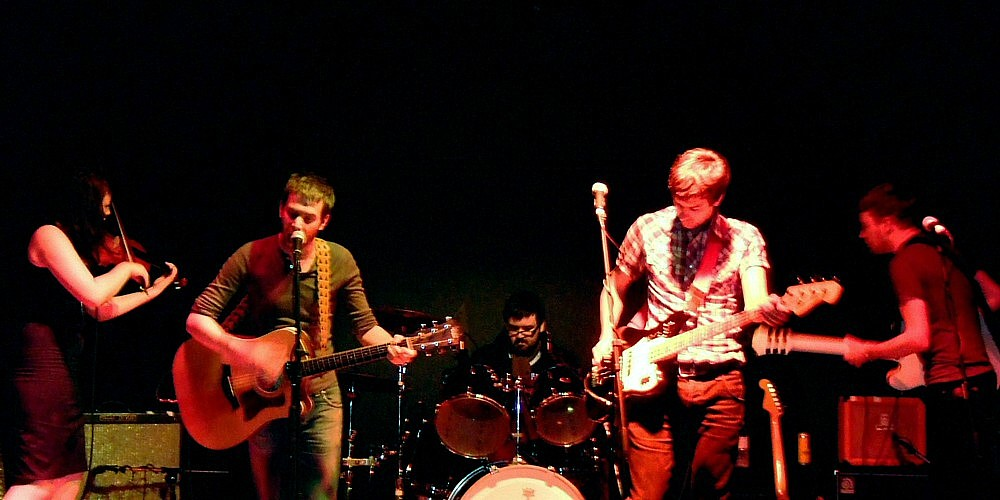
- My Latest Novel at Dundee Doghouse

Background information
- Origin: Scotland
- Genres: Indie rock, Indie pop
- Years active: 2005–present
- Labels: Bella Union
- Website: www.mylatestnovel.com

My Latest Novel are a Scottish indie band, from Greenock & Gourock. The band are signed to Bella Union records and released two albums.

== Background ==
A five-piece, (consisting of Chris Deveney, Gary Deveney, Paul McGeachy, Laura McFarlane and Ryan King), My Latest Novel are from the small town of Greenock, near Glasgow in Scotland. They augment the traditional rock line up of guitars, drums, bass and keyboards, with the use of violins, xylophones, samples and undulating percussion, as well as multi-part vocals.

The band has toured the UK with Arab Strap, Low, British Sea Power and Joanna Newsom as well as opening for the Pixies at Meadowbank Stadium in Edinburgh. They have also toured the UK and mainland Europe, Australia and U.S. independently. They are signed to the British record label Bella Union Records, and in the US with The Worker's Institute both of whom released their debut album Wolves in 2006.

They released their second album, Deaths and Entrances, on 18 May 2009 on Bella Union to much critical acclaim.

My Latest Novel were working on their as yet untitled third album featuring songs with working titles such as "What's the Secret Eugene?", "This Afternoon I Died", "Good Bees/Strong Hives" and "The Weather Song", however the band have taken an extensive break.

As of March 2010, Laura McFarlane and Paul McGeachy have left the band to pursue other projects.

In 2013, remaining members Chris Deveney, Gary Deveney and Ryan King worked under the name Alphabetical Order Orchestra, and recorded tracks with Andy Miller (who they worked with to record Wolves and Deaths & Entrances). They released a four track EP called AOO1 in 2014.

== Side projects ==
Laura McFarlane played violin for The Twilight Sad on their 2008 mini-album Here, It Never Snowed. Afterwards It Did, as well as their 2009 album Forget the Night Ahead.

Chris Deveney sang lead vocals on the Viva Stereo track "Last Living Hope" from their 2008 album Roar, Lion, Roar.

== Discography ==
=== Studio albums ===
- Wolves (2006)
- Deaths & Entrances (2009)

=== Singles ===
- "Sister Sneaker Sister Soul" (2005)
- "The Reputation of Ross Francis" (2006)
- "When We Were Wolves / Pretty in a Panic" (2006)
