= EHL Wolves =

- City: Lausanne (Vaud)
- League: Ligue Lausannoise
- Founded: 2005
- Home arena: Pontaise
- Colors: Blue, black, white,
- President: Cla Stifel

Franchise history
- "Unleash the Wolve!"

The EHL Wolves are a non-professional Ice Hockey team based in Lausanne, Switzerland. Ice hockey is the most popular sport in Switzerland, which is equally reflected at the École hôtelière de Lausanne. The 'EHL Wolves' name of the club was coined in 2010, although the team existed as the 'Ice Hockey Committee' since 2005.

== History ==
Since its inception in 2005, the EHL wolves have won numerous accolades. In 2010, they won the championship of "Ligue Lausannoise de hockey-sur-glace". A high level of training during the 2011–2012 season led to a season with no losses.

In 2005, the club was formed by Rodrigue Benoit, a chef at EHL and former European Hockey League player along with Mr. Chris Norton, former EHL Marketing Director and NHL player. In 2010, the EHL wolves defeated the University of Lausanne (UNIL) in the Junior Elite League in Switzerland to become Champions for the first time, that same year, the EHL's name and logo are decided upon. In 2012, the Wolves won the Junior Elite League a second time. In 2014, Arnaud Barbezat took over the team's captaincy. Still undergoing roster changes, the EHL Wolves dropped further in the rankings. In 2016, the capitancy passes to Tim Zaggner, and in 2017, it passed to Marco Rosso. In 2020, due to the COVID pandemic, the EHL Wolves were only able to play five games.

On November 3, 2021, the EHL Wolves won the championship a third time against the champions of last two editions of the League HC Montchoisi with a score of 6–3. The photo for this title is also displayed at EHL next to the sports reception.

In 2023, the committee was chaired by Yanick Gujer during his final year at EHL. Under his leadership, the committee underwent a complete restructuring after a challenging period and created the new slogan of the team: "Unleash the Howl, Dominate the Ice ! EHL Wolves".

In February 2023, he appointed Corentin d'Autheville as vice-president. Together, they spearheaded a comprehensive overhaul of the sports structure, ensuring that the team now consists exclusively of EHL students. Corentin d'Autheville became president in September 2024. Under his presidency with MR Federico Tomasini as vice-president, many events took place, such as the visit of a Lausanne Hockey Club delegation to the campus, including Cristobal Huet, John Fust, and Quirin Sohnlein. They had the opportunity to tour the campus, take part in a wine-tasting workshop, and deliver an inspiring conference on sports management to the students. The committee also launched Hockey Night Fever at the Montreux Jazz Café of EHL: two unforgettable evenings with a DJ and activities lasting until 1 a.m.

For the 2024–2025 season, the EHL Wolves' home rink will be La Pontaise since the Vaudoise Arena is no longer accessible to teams in the Lausannoise league. The team is now composed of 25 students from EHL.

== Team colors ==
The Wolves logo is a gray wolf (canis lupus), wild member of the Canidae family. It represents the noble and strong esprit de corps among each individual of the club. This is derived from the reputation of the Ecole hôtelière de Lausanne, being renowned as one of the oldest and best hospitality management school in the world.

Home uniform sweaters are predominantly blue in colour. Away uniform sweaters are predominantly white.

== Rosters ==
=== 2024-2025 ===
Player name	Position	Number	Nationality
Matis Duffar-Calder	G	99	(Canada)
Tobia Mottis	G	22	(Switzerland) (Fiji) (Bhutan)
Jeremy Waldburger	D	17	(Switzerland) (France)
Maximilian Rek	D	11	(Switzerland) (Germany)
Colin Rieffel	D	8	(Switzerland)
Leon Kühne	D	87	(Switzerland)
Kaito Locher (A)	D	4	(Switzerland) (Japan)
Andrea Ronchetti	D	77	(Switzerland)
Ayden Lam	D	15	(Hong Kong)
Mathieu Minvielle	D	26	(France) (Canada)
Sven Richon	D	88	(Switzerland)
Nick May	D	16	(Switzerland) (South Africa)
Matias Mork (C)	A	66	(Norway)
Karl Marius Jorgensen	A	7	(Norway)
Sebastien Cevey	A	27	(Switzerland)
Timo Tanner	A	61	(Switzerland)
Paul Daneyrole	A	13	(Switzerland) (France)
Christian Antonini	A	5	(Switzerland)
Claudio Bertschinger	A	4	(Switzerland)
Noah Godonou (A)	A	9	(Switzerland) (France) (Benin)
Jan De laco	A	28	(Switzerland)
Marc Ramseier	A	81	(Switzerland)
Niko Zwalhen	A	14	(Switzerland)
Louka Scarabello	A	3	(Switzerland) (Italy)
Sven Richon	A	99	(Switzerland)
Corentin d'Autheville	C	34	(Switzerland) (France)

=== 2025-2026 ===
Player name	Position	Number	Nationality
Jules Grobet	G	29	
Kaito Locher	D	4	(Switzerland) (Japan)
Maximilian Rek	D	11	(Switzerland) (Germany)
Andrea Ronchetti (A)	D	77	(Switzerland)
Leon Kühne	D	88	(Switzerland)
Louka Scarabello	A	3	(Switzerland) (Italy)
Noah Godonou (A)	A	9	(Switzerland) (France) (Benin)
Louis Nageleisen	A	21	(France)
Matias Mork (C)	A	66	(Norway)
Sven Richon	A	99	(Switzerland)
Christian Antonini	W	5	(Switzerland)
Jean Naef	W	6	
Pascal Bauer	W	7	(Switzerland)
Karl Marius Jorgensen	W	8	(Norway)
Paul Daneyrole	W	13	(Switzerland) (France)
Niko Zwalhen	W	20	(Switzerland)
Marc Ramseier	W	81	(Switzerland)
Clà Stifel	W	87	(Switzerland)
Corentin d'Autheville	C	34	(Switzerland) (France)

Note: (C) = Captain, (A) = Assistant, G = Goalie, D = Defense, C = Centre, RW = Right Wing, LW = Left Wing

== Seasons and records ==
Season	Points	Games	Won	Tied	Lost	Goals for	Goals against	Position	Comments
Ligue Lausannoise Season 2009-2010	28	18	14	1	3	126	57	1st	First time champions of the Ligue Lausannoise
Ligue Lausannoise Season 2010-2011	29	18	15	0	3	149	44	2nd	Runner-up
Ligue Lausannoise Season 2011-2012	36	18	17	0	1	138	49	1st	Second time champions of the Ligue Lausannoise
Ligue Lausannoise Season 2012-2013	8	18	3	2	13	78	124	8th	-
Ligue Lausannoise Season 2013-2014	5	18	2	1	15	64	143	10th	-
Ligue Lausannoise Season 2014-2015	4	18	1	2	15	53	192	10th	-
Ligue Lausannoise Season 2015-2016	3	18	1	1	16	64	189	10th	-
Ligue Lausannoise Season 2016-2017	4	18	2	0	16	76	211	10th	-
Ligue Lausannoise Season 2017-2018	2	17	5	0	12	68	98	10th	Deduction of 8 points (disciplinary sanction)
Ligue Lausannoise Season 2018-2019	26	17	12	3	2	143	56	3rd	-
Ligue Lausannoise Season 2019-2020	24	17	11	4	2	131	82	2nd	-
Ligue Lausannoise Season 2021-2022	28	16	14	0	2	136	76	1st	Third time champions of the Ligue Lausannoise
Ligue Lausannoise Season 2022-2023	18	16	10	5	1	89	76	5th	Point deductions (disciplinary sanctions)
Ligue Lausannoise Season 2023-2024	14	15	7	3	5	124	85	5th	Point deductions -3

Note: Each victory accounts for 2 points. Some points might have been lost for not complying with league regulations.

== Past Presidents of the EHL Hockey Committee ==
The president of the Ice Hockey Committee at EHL is responsible for the organisation of the games, events with the committee at EHL, official matters with the league and any and all contacts with the university.

Name	Years	Nationality
Chris Norton	2005-2007	(Canada)
Rodrigue Benoît	2005-2007	(Canada)
Roch Serres	2007-2008	(France)
Michaël Schlegel	2009-2012	(Canada) (Switzerland) (Sweden)
Jonathan Gaehler	2012-2013	(Switzerland)
Gregoire Martin	2013-2014	(France) (United States)
Arnaud Barbezat	2014-2016	(Switzerland)
Tim Zangger	2015-2017	(Switzerland)
Lorenzo Pellegrini	2017-2018	(Italy) (Germany)
Marco Rosso	2017-2019	(Switzerland) (France)
Luca Baudino	2018-2019	(Switzerland)
Gilles Metroz	2019-2020	(Switzerland)
Jeremy Laporte	2020-2021	(Switzerland)
Maxime Vez	2021-2022	(Switzerland)
Adrian Florin Ionescu	2022-2024	(Romania) (Switzerland)
Yanick Gujer	2023-2024	(Switzerland)
Corentin d'Autheville	2024-2025	(Switzerland) (France)
Kaito Locher	2025-2026	(Switzerland) (Japan)
