= Wolves (My Latest Novel album) =

Studio album by My Latest Novel
- Released: 6 March 2006
- Genre: Indie rock, indie pop
- Label: Bella Union (UK); The Worker's Institute (U.S.)

My Latest Novel chronology
Wolves (2006)	Deaths and Entrances (2009)

Professional ratings
Review scores
Source	Rating
Allmusic	4/5 stars
NME	(9/10)
Pitchfork	(7.9/10)
Stylus	(B)

Wolves is the debut studio album by Scottish indie rock band My Latest Novel, released on 6 March 2006 on Bella Union/The Worker's Institute. The album is entitled Wolves due to the collaborative nature of the band; vocalist and guitarist Gary Deveney states that the band "write like a pack."

== Recording ==
According to guitarist and vocalist Chris Deveney, the recording process:

was just two months where we were looked in the room, and we’d [have] 10 hour days. A lot of the days were spent shopping and buying food and stuff like that, and just doing things under budget. There were bits of songs that we were working on and we didn’t try and force it, but it was always about getting the best take and finding the best way to do things, and try and get it how we wanted to present it across.

== Song information ==
According to vocalist and guitarist Gary Deveney, "The Reputation of Ross Francis" is based on a friend of the band:

He is someone from our hometown; he’s an elaborate character. Everyone knows him and everyone knows about him, so we thought we should write a song. Once we got going it was really easy, because it was someone that we all knew and who we thought deserved a song written about him. He’s the person that everything seems to always happen to, he tells elaborate stories – he’s just a character.

== Track listing ==
1. "Ghost in the Gutter" – 6:32
2. "Pretty in a Panic" – 4:19
3. "Learning Lego" – 4:30
4. "The Hope Edition" – 4:48
5. "The Job Mr. Kurtz Done" – 3:23
6. "Sister Sneaker Sister Soul" – 6:00
7. "When We Were Wolves" – 4:13
8. "Wrongfully, I Rested" – 4:43
9. "Boredom Killed Another" – 4:49
10. "The Reputation of Ross Francis" – 2:59
