= SMS Wolf =

Several warships of the German Kaiserliche Marine (Imperial Navy) have been named SMS Wolf:

- SMS Wolf (1860), a gunboat of the Jäger class
- SMS Wolf (1878), a gunboat of the Wolf class
- SMS Wolf (1906), an auxiliary cruiser
- SMS Wolf (1916), an auxiliary cruiser
