= Wolf Mountain (Montana) =

Mountain in Park County, Montana, United States

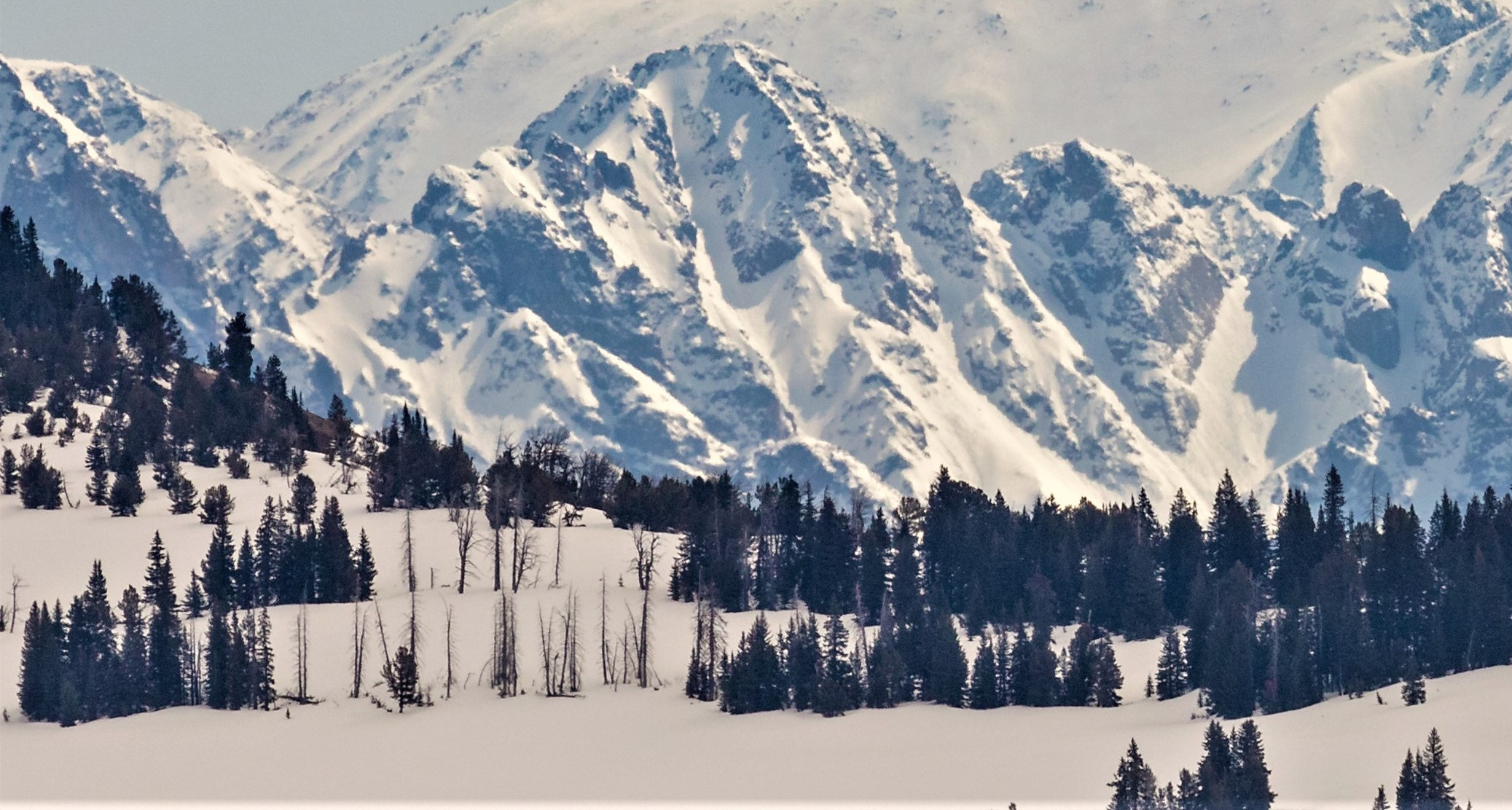
- West aspect

Highest point
- Elevation: 11,808 ft (3,599 m)
- Prominence: 1,120 ft (340 m)
- Parent peak: Mount Wilse (11,831 ft)
- Isolation: 2.68 mi (4.31 km)
- Coordinates: 45°09′04″N 109°54′46″W

Geography
- Location within Montana Location within the United States
- Country: United States
- State: Montana
- County: Park
- Protected area: Absaroka-Beartooth Wilderness
- Parent range: Rocky Mountains; Absaroka Range; Beartooth Mountains
- Topo map: USGS Little Park Mountain

Geology
- Rock age: Precambrian
- Rock type: Granite

Climbing
- First ascent: 1926 Norman Clyde
- Easiest route: class 3 scrambling

Wolf Mountain is an 11,808-foot (3,599-metre) mountain summit located in Park County, Montana.

== Description ==
Wolf Mountain is located in the Beartooth Mountains, which are a subset of the Rocky Mountains. It is situated in the Absaroka-Beartooth Wilderness, on land managed by Custer National Forest. Wolf Mountain ranks as the 35th-highest summit in Montana, whereas the highest point in Montana, Granite Peak, rises five miles to the east. Precipitation runoff from the mountain drains into Clarks Creek and Glacier Creek which are tributaries of the Stillwater River. Topographic relief is significant as the summit rises 2,860 feet (870 meters) above Glacier Green Lake in less than one mile. This geographical feature's name has been officially adopted by the United States Board on Geographic Names. The first known ascent of the summit was made in 1926 by Norman Clyde, one of the most-accomplished American mountaineers.

== Climate ==
Based on the Köppen climate classification, Wolf Mountain is located in a subarctic climate zone characterized by long, usually very cold winters, and mild summers. Winter temperatures can drop below −10 °F with wind chill factors below −30 °F. This climate supports the Wolf Glacier in the east cirque.

== See also ==
- Geology of the Rocky Mountains

== Gallery ==
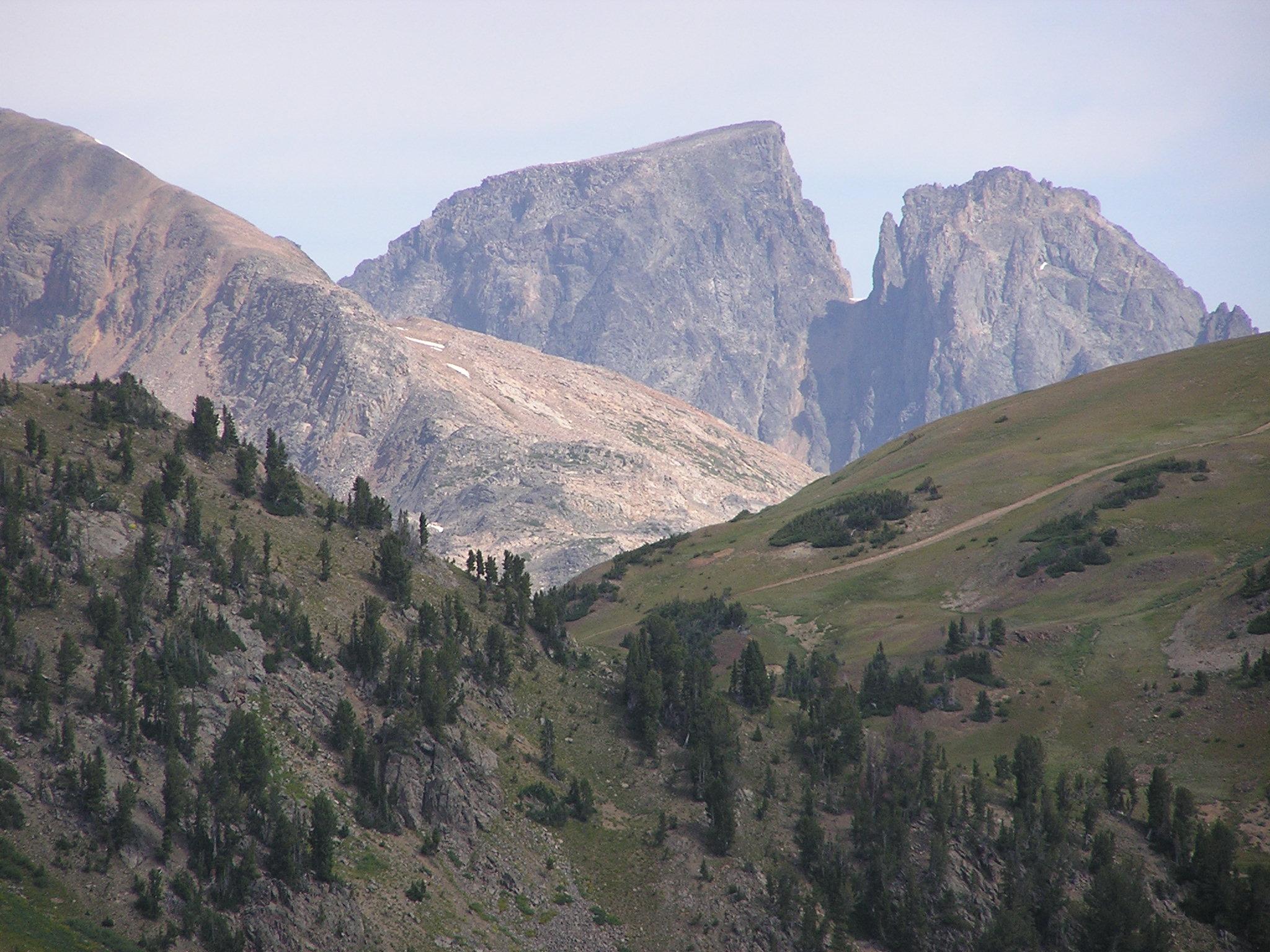
South aspect

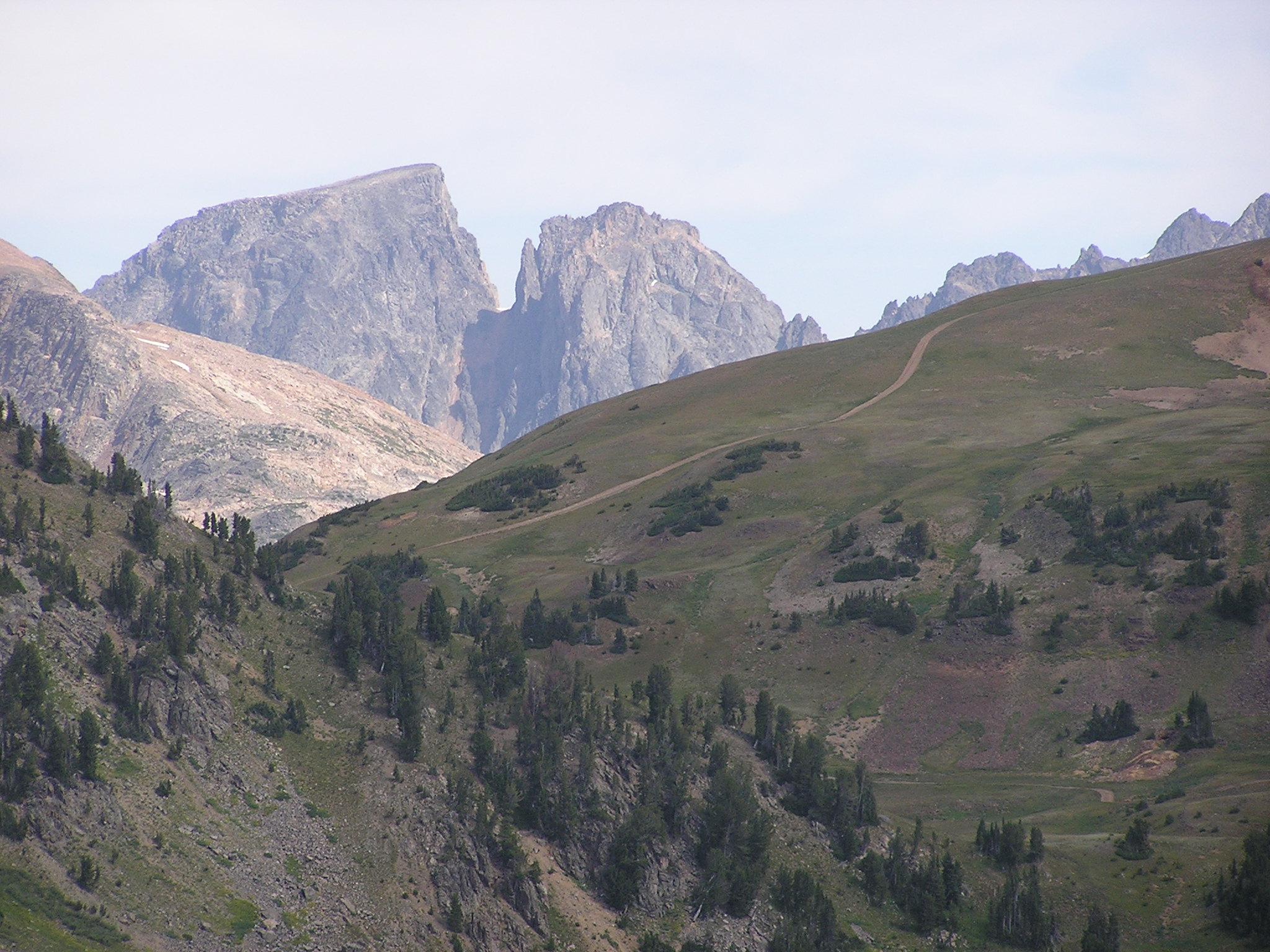
South aspect, upper left

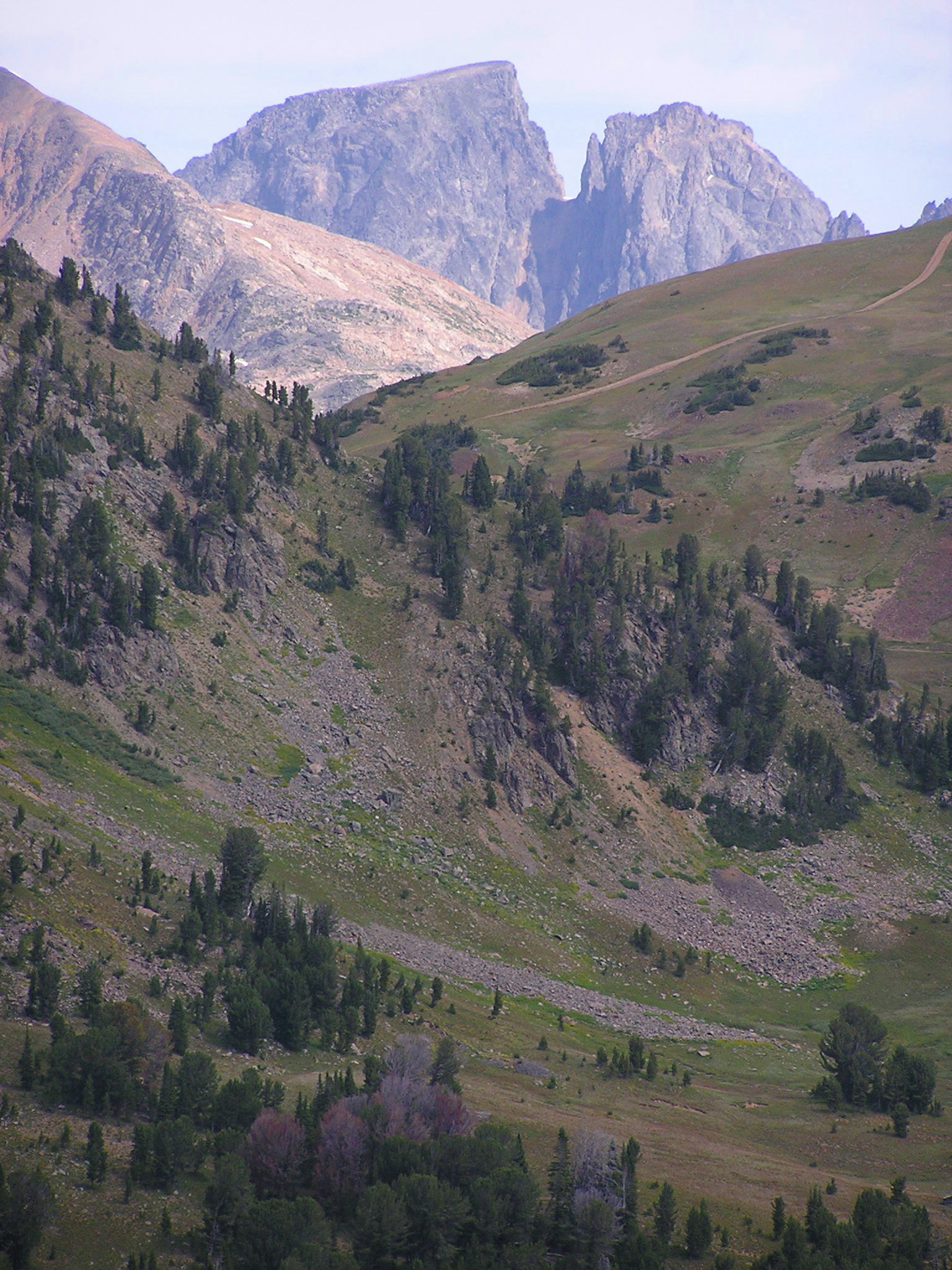
