= Western Wolves FC =

Australian football club

The Western Wolves Football Club is an association football club based in the western suburbs of Melbourne, Victoria, Australia.

Representing the Western Zone in the Victorian Champions League, as one of twelve teams competing, Western Wolves represent all the clubs from the West region of Melbourne.

Western Wolves home ground is in Caroline Springs, Victoria. The club kit supplier is Adidas, and the colours of Western Wolves are Yellow, black and white. The away colours are Red, black and white.

== Early Days of the Western Wolves ==
The Western Wolves was founded in 2008 as "Western FC". The club's homeground was VU Wyndham Sporting Complex in Werribee, Victoria. The Western FC was a very strong team in its first season, which was then known as Summer League and finished with 2 Premiership titles in the U15 boys, and U13 girls, with many other teams making Semi-Finals, but none of the Western teams won the Championship.

== Kits ==
The Western Wolves early kit was a yellow shirt, white socks and shorts with the kit sponsor being Covo. The Kits today are a yellow shirt, black shorts and socks, and the away strip containing a red shirt with the sponsors being Adidas.

The Training kit is by Pelada which is a Football Kit supplier based in the United Kingdom.

== Home ground ==
The Home Ground of the Western Wolves is in hopper crossing, the ground is home for Spring Hills FC. Darebin International Sports Centre is also another venue used by the Western Wolves and was the main home ground for the Western Wolves in season 1. VU Wydnaham Sporting Complex has been the training ground for the Western Wolves first 2 seasons. Once Grange Reserve is fully completed, the Western Wolves will switch all training sessions to Grange Reserve. VU Wydnham Sporting Complex is said by the FFV not a suitable ground for matchdays as it is mainly for Rugby purposes.

Both Grange Reserve and Darebin International Sports Centre are synthetic pitches.

In the last two season (2010/2011 & 2011/2012) their main ground is in Caroline Springs.
