= Wolof =

Wolof or Wollof may refer to:

- Wolof people, an ethnic group found in Senegal, Gambia, and Mauritania
- Wolof language, a language spoken in Senegal, Gambia, and Mauritania
- The Wolof or Jolof Empire, a medieval West African successor of the Mali Empire from the 14th to 16th centuries in present-day Senegal
- The Wolof or Jolof Kingdom, a rump survival of the earlier empire in the same area from the 16th to the 19th centuries
