= Wulf (disambiguation) =

Wulf ("wolf") is an element in Germanic names.

Wulf or WULF may also refer to:

- Wulf (singer), a Dutch singer, songwriter and producer
- Wulf, the stage name of Andrej Vovk, a Slovenian metal musician
- Wulf (Middle-earth), a character in J. R. R. Tolkien's fantasy writings
- Wulf (Danny Phantom), a fictional werewolf-like character from Danny Phantom
- a character in Wulf and Eadwacer, an English poem
- Aegna, island in Estonia with old German name Wulf
- WULF, an American radio station
- TeraWulf (NASDAQ ticker WULF)
