= Wolf Brigade =

Wolf Brigade may refer to a number of military and para-military units:

- Motorised Infantry Brigade Iron Wolf, a unit of the Lithuanian Army
- Wolf Brigade (Iraq), a special commando police unit under Iraq's Ministry of Interior
- Jin-Roh: The Wolf Brigade, a 1999 Japanese anime film centred on an eponymous para-military unit of the Japanese police in an alternative timeline
- Illang: The Wolf Brigade, a 2018 Korean live-action science fiction film adapted from Jin-Roh: The Wolf Brigade
