= Timber Wolf =

Timber wolf, timberwolf, timber wolves, or timberwolves might refer to:

== Animals ==
- Any of several subspecies of Canis lupus, which inhabits forested areas, especially:
  - Eastern wolf, also known as the eastern timber wolf
  - Northern Rocky Mountain wolf, a timber wolf that inhabits the northern Rocky Mountains
  - Northwestern wolf, also known as the Mackenzie Valley wolf, Alaskan timber wolf, Canadian timber wolf, or northern timber wolf

== Arts and entertainment ==
=== Film ===
- The Timber Wolf, a 1925 American silent western film directed by W. S. Van Dyke

=== Rides ===
- Timber Wolf (roller coaster), at Worlds of Fun, Kansas City, Missouri
- Timberwolf Falls, a water ride at Canada's Wonderland

== Military ==
- C14 Timberwolf, a sniper rifle
- IMI Timber Wolf, a pump-action carbine
- 104th Infantry Division (United States), the "Timberwolf Division"

== Sport ==
- Timberwolves, University of Northern British Columbia
- Minnesota Timberwolves, a National Basketball Association franchise
- Miramichi Timberwolves, a Maritime Junior Hockey League team
- Northwood Timberwolves, teams of Northwood University
- Timberwolves, teams of Canadian International School of Hong Kong
- Spruce Timberwolves, teams of H. Grady Spruce High School
- Timpanogos Timberwolves, teams of Timpanogos High School
- Lake City Timberwolves, teams of Lake City High School
- Chiles Timberwolves, teams of Chiles High School in Tallahassee, FL
- Fort Bragg Timberwolves, teams of Fort Bragg High School
- Blue Valley Southwest Timberwolves, teams of Blue Valley Southwest Highschool

== Other uses ==
- Timber Wolf (character), DC comics character
- Timberwolf, a fictional species in the TV series My Little Pony: Friendship Is Magic
- Timberwolf, an age-based traditional scouting section in the Baden-Powell Service Association
- Timberwolf (web browser), for AmigaOS 4.1
- Bruce Fancher, alias "Timberwolf", a computer hacker
- Timber Wolf, a brand of snuff tobacco produced by Swedish Match
- Timberwolf, a Secret Service code name for president George H. W. Bush
- Timberwolf, a Crayola crayon color
