= Rudolf Wolff & Co. =

British commodity brokerage

Rudolf Wolff & Co. was founded in London in 1866 as a metal merchant.

In 1877, Rudolf Wolff was amongst the group of merchants who formed the London Metal Exchange. Over the years Rudolf Wolff & Co became one of the leading brokers and Ring dealing member of the London Metal Exchange and members of the Company have played a very active role in the organization and running of the Exchange.

In 1982, Rudolf Wolff & Co. Ltd. became a wholly owned subsidiary of Noranda.

In the 1990s Rudolf Wolff dealt in a range of over 150 commodity futures and options, covering metals, agricultural commodities, energy, currencies, financial instruments and stock indices, trading on more than 20 international exchanges.

In 2000, Noranda decided to close Rudolf Wolff & Co. and assets from the company were bought by Metallgesellschaft.

== Continuation of name ==
Rudolf Wolff Limited is now a specialist London based fund management firm under the helm of Howard Colvin and authorised and regulated by the Financial Conduct Authority (FCA) pka the Financial Services Authority ("FSA") in the United Kingdom. The name Rudolf Wolff has been associated with the City for almost 150 years. The original Rudolf Wolff was a German metals merchant who established Rudolf Wolff & Co. in London in 1866. That company became a founding member of the London Metal Exchange in 1877, the pre-eminent international terminal market for primary base metals.

The Rudolf Wolff brand name was re-launched in 2008 by a team that includes a number of the former management and family of Rudolf Wolff.
