= The Wolf (1917 film) =

Hungarian film

- Directed by: Michael Curtiz
- Written by: Michael Curtiz; Ferenc Molnár; Ladislaus Vajda
- Produced by: Aladár Fodor; János Fröhlich
- Starring: Artúr Somlay; Frida Gombaszögi; Victor Varconi
- Cinematography: József Bécsi
- Distributed by: Kino-Riport
- Release date: 1 January 1917
- Country: Hungary
- Language: Silent

The Wolf (Hungarian: Farkas) is a 1917 Hungarian film directed by Michael Curtiz.

== Cast ==
- Artúr Somlay as Dr. Kelemen Jenõ ügyvéd
- Frida Gombaszögi as Vilma, Kelemen felesége
- Victor Varconi as Szabó Gyuri (as Várkonyi Mihály)
- Lucy Doraine (as Kovács Ilonka)
- Hermin Haraszti
- Vilmos Lóránth (as Vilmos Lóránt)
