= National Register of Historic Places listings in Carbon County, Montana =

Location of Carbon County in Montana

This is a list of the National Register of Historic Places listings in Carbon County, Montana.

This is intended to be a complete list of the properties and districts on the National Register of Historic Places in Carbon County, Montana, United States. The locations of National Register properties and districts for which the latitude and longitude coordinates are included below, may be seen in a map.

There are 68 properties and districts listed on the National Register in the county.

This National Park Service list is complete through NPS recent listings posted October 16, 2026.

== Current listings ==
	Name on the Register	Image	Date listed	Location	City or town	Description
1	Bad Pass Trail	Bad Pass Trail	October 29, 1975 (#75000215)	East of Warren along the Big Horn River in the Bighorn Canyon National Recreation Area; 45°03′07″N 108°15′44″W	Warren	
2	Baker and Lovering Store	Baker and Lovering Store	May 2, 1986 (#86000885)	Main St. 45°29′06″N 108°58′10″W	Joliet	
3	Baldwin Building		January 28, 1993 (#92001777)	Junction of W. River St. and Harley Ave. 45°23′31″N 108°54′25″W	Fromberg	Demolished
4	Bearcreek Bank	Bearcreek Bank	March 31, 2004 (#04000251)	Main and 2nd Sts. 45°09′40″N 109°09′30″W	Bearcreek	
5	Bearcreek Cemetery	Bearcreek Cemetery	January 18, 2011 (#11000017)	1 mile west of Bearcreek; 45°09′30″N 109°08′21″W	Bearcreek	
6	Dr. Theodore J. Benson House	Dr. Theodore J. Benson House	January 28, 1993 (#92001780)	10 N. Montana; 45°23′33″N 108°54′32″W	Fromberg	
7	John Blewett House	John Blewett House	January 28, 1993 (#92001789)	2411 E. River St. 45°23′30″N 108°54′05″W	Fromberg	
8	Bluewater Creek Bridge	Bluewater Creek Bridge	April 28, 2011 (#11000223)	Milepost 8 on Bluewater Creek Rd. 45°22′10″N 108°52′56″W	Fromberg	
9	Bridger Coal Company House	Bridger Coal Company House	September 15, 1987 (#87001215)	307 W. Broadway; 45°17′46″N 108°55′00″W	Bridger	
10	Bridger Opera House	Bridger Opera House	September 15, 1987 (#87001217)	E. Broadway; 45°17′44″N 108°54′39″W	Bridger	Demolished
11	Frank Brooder House	Frank Brooder House	January 28, 1993 (#92001787)	303 North St. 45°23′38″N 108°54′37″W	Fromberg	
12	Calvary Episcopal Church	Calvary Episcopal Church	October 23, 1986 (#86002928)	9 N. Villard Ave. 45°11′16″N 109°14′56″W	Red Lodge	
13	Camp Senia Historic District		April 14, 1988 (#88000441)	Custer National Forest; 45°10′15″N 109°28′34″W	Red Lodge	Boundary increased 2015-08-10
14	Cedarvale	Cedarvale	August 19, 1975 (#75000161)	Present town of Hillsboro and its environs in the Bighorn Canyon National Recreation Area; 45°05′53″N 108°13′26″W	Hillsboro	
15	Corey House	Corey House	July 21, 1987 (#87001219)	106 N. E St. 45°17′46″N 108°54′21″W	Bridger	
16	Demijohn Flat Archeological District	Demijohn Flat Archeological District	November 20, 1974 (#74001092)	Address restricted	Bridger	
17	Ewing-Snell Ranch	Ewing-Snell Ranch	May 12, 1977 (#77000114)	South of Dryhead; 45°05′02″N 108°15′49″W	Dryhead	
18	Farmers Trading Company		March 10, 2025 (#100011503)	120 South Main Street; 45°17′42″N 108°54′51″W	Bridger	
19	Fire Hall	Fire Hall	May 2, 1986 (#86000884)	Main St. 45°29′05″N 108°58′10″W	Joliet	
20	Forsman House	Forsman House	July 21, 1987 (#87001233)	406 E. Carbon Ave. 45°17′35″N 108°54′29″W	Bridger	
21	Fromberg Concrete Arch Bridge	Fromberg Concrete Arch Bridge	January 28, 1993 (#92001790)	River St. over the Clarks Fork of the Yellowstone River; 45°23′31″N 108°53′39″W	Fromberg	
22	Fromberg High School	Fromberg High School	January 28, 1993 (#92001788)	Kids Ct. 45°23′35″N 108°54′41″W	Fromberg	
23	Fromberg Methodist-Episcopal Church	Fromberg Methodist-Episcopal Church	January 28, 1993 (#92001781)	Junction of N. Montana Ave. and School St. 45°23′34″N 108°54′32″W	Fromberg	
24	Fromberg Opera House	Fromberg Opera House	January 28, 1993 (#92001779)	Junction of Harley Ave. and C St. 45°23′35″N 108°54′24″W	Fromberg	
25	Gebo Barn	Gebo Barn	June 1, 2005 (#05000512)	2.5 miles south of Fromberg on River Rd. 45°21′15″N 108°54′22″W	Fromberg	Large concrete gambrel-roofed barn on Gebo Ranch, of coal mine developer Samuel Gebo.
26	Gebo Cemetery	Gebo Cemetery	April 8, 1993 (#93000291)	County road linking Gebo and Fromberg; 45°24′12″N 108°55′23″W	Fromberg	
27	Henry Gebo House		July 21, 1987 (#87001234)	East of Bridger; 45°17′56″N 108°53′57″W	Bridger	Queen Anne-style house, largest house in area
28	John Gibson House	John Gibson House	January 28, 1993 (#92001785)	219 W. River St. 45°23′31″N 108°54′36″W	Fromberg	
29	Glidden House	Glidden House	July 21, 1987 (#87001236)	112 N. E St. 45°17′47″N 108°54′22″W	Bridger	
30	Glidden Mercantile	Glidden Mercantile	September 15, 1987 (#87001237)	102 N. Main; 45°17′46″N 108°54′49″W	Bridger	
31	Samuel Greenblatt House	Samuel Greenblatt House	January 28, 1993 (#92001784)	215 W. River St. 45°23′31″N 108°54′34″W	Fromberg	
32	Heatherington Boarding House	Heatherington Boarding House	September 15, 1987 (#87001240)	209 E. Broadway; 45°17′46″N 108°54′41″W	Bridger	
33	Hi Bug Historic District	Hi Bug Historic District	July 23, 1986 (#86001932)	Roughly bounded by W. 3rd St., N. Villard Ave., W. 8th St., and N. Word Ave. 45°11′35″N 109°14′58″W	Red Lodge	
34	Raymond Hough House	Raymond Hough House	September 15, 1987 (#87001242)	312 S. 2nd 45°17′35″N 108°54′54″W	Bridger	
35	House on Railroad Avenue	House on Railroad Avenue	May 2, 1986 (#86000889)	Railroad Ave. 45°29′10″N 108°58′12″W	Joliet	
36	IOOF Hall and Fromberg Co-operative Mercantile Building	IOOF Hall and Fromberg Co-operative Mercantile Building	January 28, 1993 (#92001778)	123 W. River St. 45°23′31″N 108°54′31″W	Fromberg	
37	Joliet Bridge	Joliet Bridge	May 2, 1986 (#86000888)	US 212 east of Joliet; 45°29′15″N 108°57′51″W	Joliet	Formerly crossed Rock Creek south of Joliet. Now sitting near US212 east of Joliet.
38	Joliet High School	Joliet High School	May 2, 1986 (#86000887)	Main St. 45°29′15″N 108°58′23″W	Joliet	
39	Joliet Residential Historic District	Joliet Residential Historic District	May 2, 1986 (#86000892)	Roughly bounded by the Northern Pacific railroad line and U.S. Route 12, State St., Carbon Ave., and 2nd St. 45°29′04″N 108°58′11″W	Joliet	
40	Kent Dairy Round Barn	Kent Dairy Round Barn	April 7, 1995 (#95000381)	Along U.S. Route 212, 2 miles north of Red Lodge; 45°13′09″N 109°14′29″W	Red Lodge	
41	Kero Farmstead Historic District		August 16, 2007 (#07000815)	223 W. Bench Rd. 45°17′32″N 109°13′05″W	Roberts	
42	Kose Hall	Kose Hall	April 9, 2013 (#13000152)	216 Broadway Ave. 45°08′34″N 109°00′29″W	Belfry	
43	Caroline Lockhart Ranch	Caroline Lockhart Ranch	November 3, 1989 (#89000155)	Davis Creek, 70 miles south of Hardin; 45°08′17″N 108°14′24″W	Dead Hill	
44	Dr. Carl Marcus House	Dr. Carl Marcus House	September 15, 1987 (#87001243)	210 S. 2nd 45°17′41″N 108°54′54″W	Bridger	
45	Tracy McCall House	Tracy McCall House	January 28, 1993 (#92001782)	110 N. Montana Ave. 45°23′36″N 108°54′32″W	Fromberg	
46	Methodist Episcopal Church and Parsonage	Methodist Episcopal Church and Parsonage	September 15, 1987 (#87001244)	220 W. Broadway; 45°17′45″N 108°54′58″W	Bridger	
47	Montana, Wyoming and Southern Railroad Depot	Montana, Wyoming and Southern Railroad Depot	October 3, 2012 (#12000828)	403 Broadway Ave. 45°08′34″N 109°00′36″W	Belfry	
48	Northern Pacific Railroad Depot-Fromberg	Northern Pacific Railroad Depot-Fromberg	January 28, 1993 (#92001776)	Junction of U.S. Route 310 and River St. 45°23′31″N 108°54′20″W	Fromberg	
49	Nutting Rental		September 15, 1987 (#87001245)	Carbon Ave. 45°17′39″N 108°54′55″W	Bridger	
50	Petroglyph Canyon	Petroglyph Canyon	November 20, 1975 (#75001079)	Southern half of Section 35, Township 9 South, Range 26 East; 45°00′20″N 108°30′14″W	Warren	
51	Pretty Creek Archeological Site	Pretty Creek Archeological Site	January 17, 1975 (#75000162)	Address restricted	Hardin	
52	Francis Rahrer House		January 28, 1993 (#92001786)	309 School St. 45°23′36″N 108°54′40″W	Fromberg	Demolished
53	Red Lodge Brewing Company-Red Lodge Canning Company	Red Lodge Brewing Company-Red Lodge Canning Company	September 5, 2007 (#07000947)	904 N. Bonner St. 45°11′46″N 109°14′40″W	Red Lodge	
54	Red Lodge Commercial Historic District	Red Lodge Commercial Historic District	April 14, 1983 (#83001057)	Roughly Broadway from 8th to 13th Sts.; also S. Broadway between 8th and 15th Sts. 45°11′32″N 109°14′48″W	Red Lodge	Second set of boundaries represents a boundary increase, added on August 28, 1986
55	Red Lodge Communal Mausoleum	Red Lodge Communal Mausoleum	March 21, 2011 (#11000114)	Montana Highway 78; 45°11′41″N 109°15′41″W	Red Lodge	
56	Red Lodge-Cooke City Approach Road Historic District	Red Lodge-Cooke City Approach Road Historic District	May 8, 2014 (#14000219)	US 212; 45°10′14″N 109°15′26″W	Red Lodge	Extends into Park County, Montana and Park County, Wyoming
57	Regis Grocery		October 28, 2024 (#100010934)	501 Word Ave South; 45°10′55″N 109°15′00″W	Red Lodge	
58	Rock Creek State Bank	Rock Creek State Bank	May 2, 1986 (#86000890)	Main St. 45°29′04″N 108°58′12″W	Joliet	
59	Rock Creek Ranger Station Historic District		October 17, 2016 (#16000729)	6811 US 212; 45°09′24″N 109°18′07″W	Red Lodge vicinity	
60	Sage Creek Ranger Station	Sage Creek Ranger Station	August 17, 2020 (#100005456)	Custer Gallatin NF, Sage Creek Guard Station Rd. 2223, Pryor Mts. 45°12′31″N 108°33′28″W	Bridger vicinity	
61	T.W. Smith House		May 2, 1986 (#86000886)	Front St. 45°29′20″N 108°57′46″W	Joliet	
62	Smith Mine Historic District	Smith Mine Historic District	September 30, 2009 (#09000788)	Montana Highway 308; 45°09′25″N 109°10′58″W	Bearcreek	
63	Southern Hotel	Southern Hotel	May 2, 1986 (#86000891)	Main St. 45°29′05″N 108°58′09″W	Joliet	
64	Hester E. Suydam Boarding House	Hester E. Suydam Boarding House	January 28, 1993 (#92001783)	209 W. River St. 45°23′31″N 108°54′33″W	Fromberg	
65	Warila Boarding House and Sauna	Warila Boarding House and Sauna	October 24, 1985 (#85003382)	20 N. Haggin; 45°11′16″N 109°14′38″W	Red Lodge	
66	Wool Warehouse		July 21, 1987 (#87001246)	E. Bridger; 45°17′44″N 108°54′32″W	Bridger	Demolished
67	Yellowstone Bighorn Research Association Camp		December 15, 2022 (#100008457)	118 Howell Gulch Rd. 45°07′19″N 109°16′21″W	Red Lodge vicinity	
68	Yodeler Motel	Yodeler Motel	March 26, 2014 (#14000078)	601 S. Broadway Ave. 45°10′51″N 109°14′50″W	Red Lodge	

== See also ==
- List of National Historic Landmarks in Montana
- National Register of Historic Places listings in Montana
