= Gebo =

Gebo may refer to:

- Gebo, Montana, a former community in Montana, United States
- Gebo, Wyoming, a ghost town in Wyoming, United States
- Gebo (surname), a surname
- *Gebô, a Proto-Germanic character, equivalent to the Runic Gyfu

== See also ==
- Gebo and the Shadow, a 2012 Portuguese-French drama film
- Gebo Barn, a structure near Fromberg, Montana
- Gebo Cemetery, a cemetery near Fromberg, Montana
