= Fromberg =

Fromberg can refer to:

- Richard Fromberg, tennis player
- Pieter Hendrik Fromberg Sr., a Dutch colonial expert on Chinese affairs
- Fromberg, Montana
- Fromberg (Netherlands), a village in the province of Limburg
