= Glidden House =

Glidden House may refer to:

- Joseph F. Glidden House, De Kalb, Illinois, NRHP-listed
- Glidden House (Bridger, Montana), listed on the NRHP in Carbon County, Montana
- Glidden House (Lee, New Hampshire), listed on the New Hampshire State Register of Historic Places
- Francis K. Glidden House, Cleveland, Ohio, listed on the NRHP in Cleveland, Ohio
