= John Blewett =

John Blewett may refer to:

- John P. Blewett (1910–2000), Canadian-American physicist
- John Blewett III (1973–2007), NASCAR driver

== See also ==
- John Blewett House, Fromberg, Montana
- John Blewitt (born 1945), British speed skater
