= Fromberg Opera House =

- U.S. National Register of Historic Places
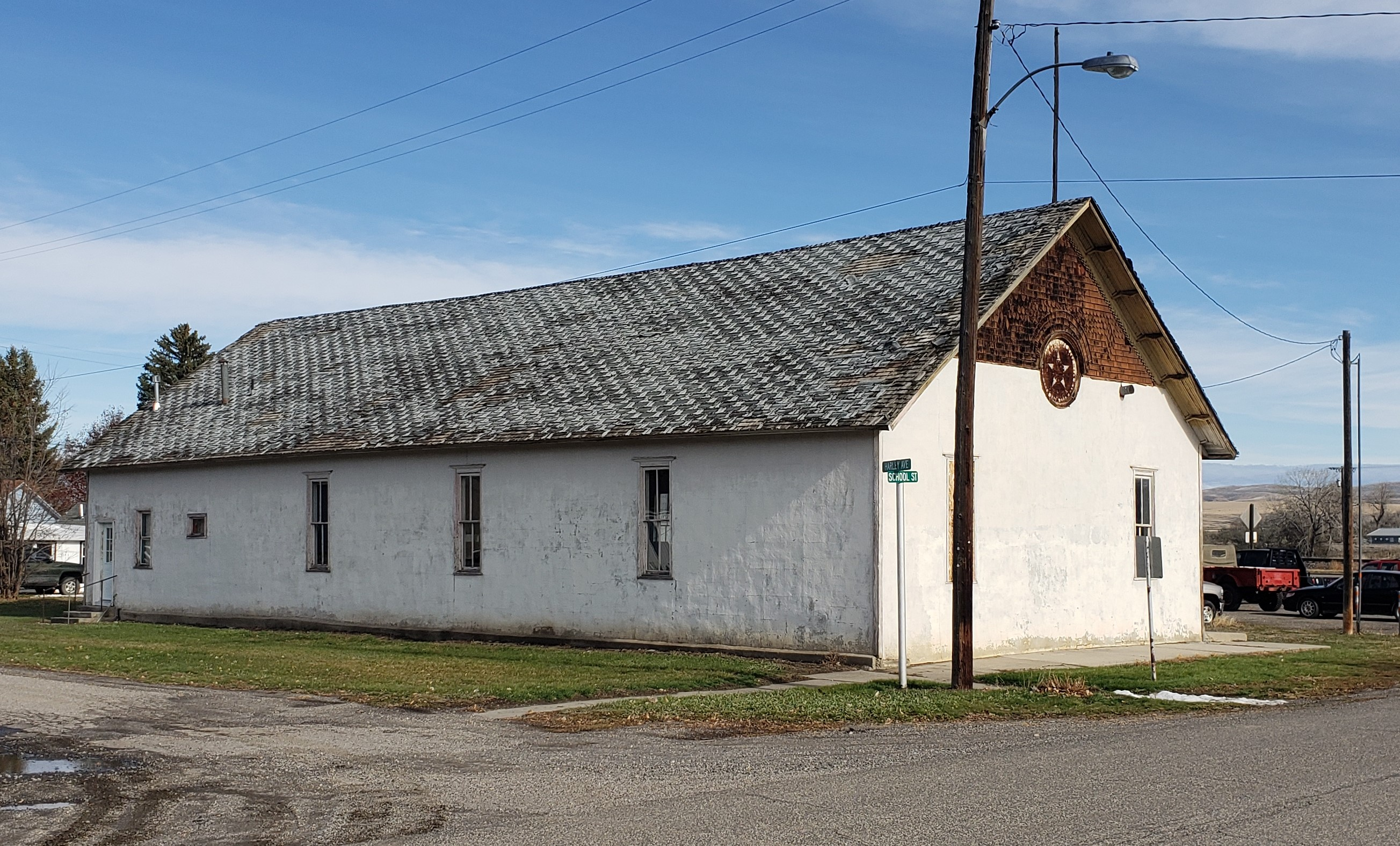

- Location within Montana Location within the United States
- Location: Jct. of Harley Ave. and C St., Fromberg, Montana
- Coordinates: 45°23′35″N 108°54′24″W
- Area: less than one acre
- Built: 1908
- Architectural style: One-story gable-roofed
- MPS: Fromberg MPS
- NRHP reference No.: 92001779
- Added to NRHP: January 28, 1993

The Fromberg Opera House, in Fromberg, Montana, was built in 1907. It was renovated to serve as the American Legion Hall in 1940. It was listed in the National Register of Historic Places in 1983.

According to its National Register nomination:

The Fromberg Opera House derives significance under Criterion A as an important reflection of the town's social and cultural development during its historic boom period (1906-1918). The Fromberg Opera House was the first public, social facility in town and served as the principal gathering place for entertainment and recreational activities in the community for over thirty years. The building was constructed by a group of town promoters in 1908 to host plays by professional troupes that traveled from town to town by train. It also quickly became used as a public hall where town and rural residents could socialize at dances and celebrations. At times the building functioned as a roller skating rink and in 1915 it offered the first glimpse at motion picture entertainment in Fromberg.
