= Hester E. Suydam Boarding House =

- U.S. National Register of Historic Places
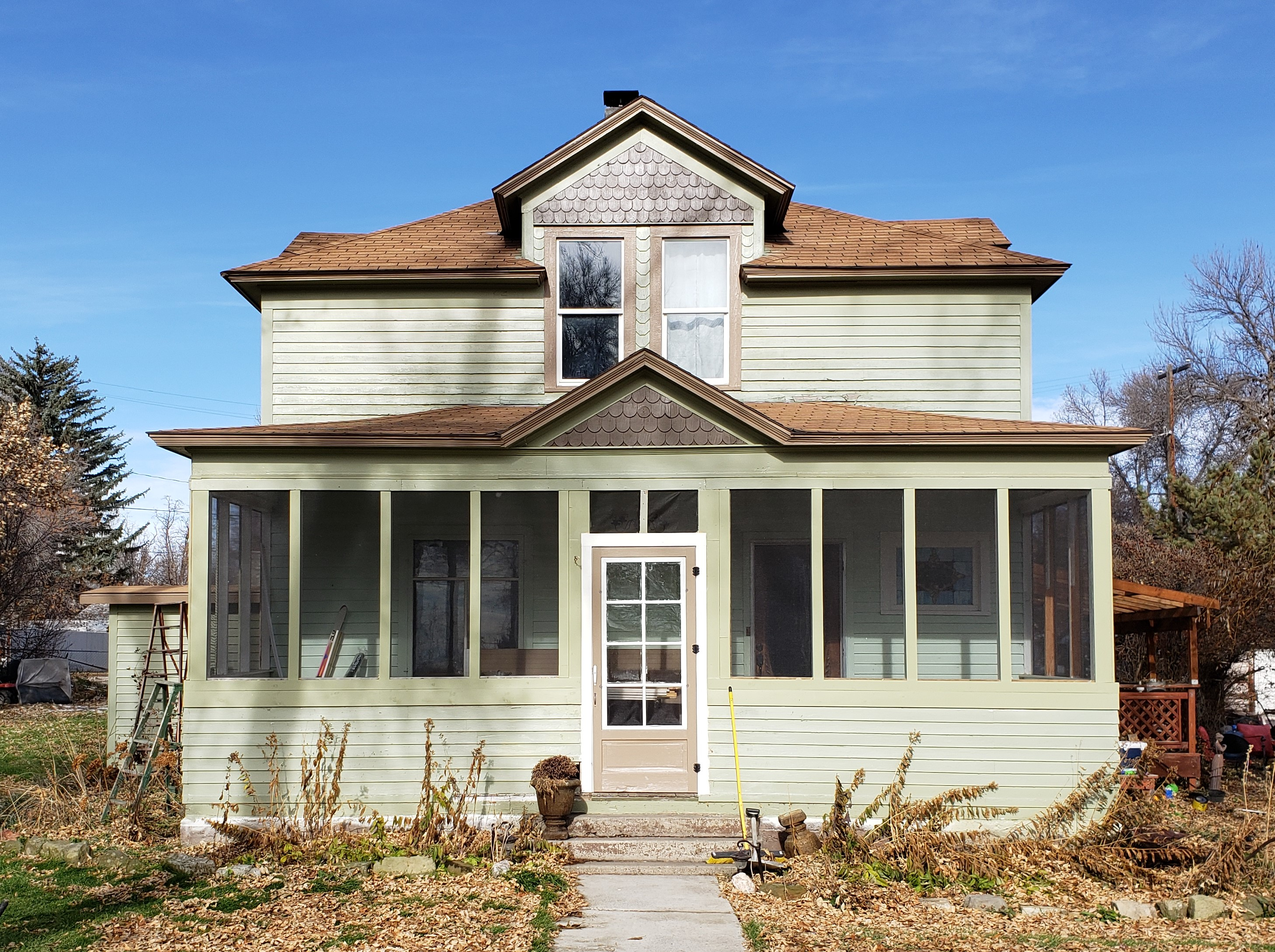

- Location within Montana Location within the United States
- Location: 209 W. River St., Fromberg, Montana
- Coordinates: 45°23′31″N 108°54′33″W
- Area: less than one acre
- Built: 1907
- MPS: Fromberg MPS
- NRHP reference No.: 92001783
- Added to NRHP: January 28, 1993

The Hester E. Suydam Boarding House, at 209 W. River St. in Fromberg, Montana, was built in 1907. It was listed on the National Register of Historic Places in 1993.

It is a two-story, hip-roofed clapboarded multiple dwelling building, resting upon a concrete foundation. It has a full-width front porch, and a 1 1/2-story gabled wing to its rear. Up to 1992, the only significant changes to the building were enclosures of its porches. (Note: The National Register nomination document mentions "Architectural Classification" as "Other: One-and-one-half story Four Square", but neither the original block of the build or the rear extension appears to be American Foursquare in style. It has dormer windows as is common in that style, but lacks symmetry, as can be seen in photos.)

It was built for Mrs. Suydam, who had operated a boarding house in Gebo, Montana, but turnover of ownership of coal mines there contributed to her perceiving Fromberg to be a more stable location. She arranged to have her boardinghouse building moved in 1906, but a wind storm destroyed it in transit.

The new building was designed to appear as a large single family house, "providing inhabitants with a homelike atmosphere". According to its National Register nomination, "Those individuals to live at Mrs. Suydam's boarding house were reflective of Fromberg's diverse population base. For example, in 1910 occupants there included a teacher, sales clerk, carpenter, fireman, and miners. Beginning in 1914, the house was called the Suydam Hotel; Mrs. Suydam had permanent guests and rooms available for those just passing through Fromberg. The Treichlers, who owned the home in the 1930s and 1940s rented rooms to teachers employed at Fromberg's schools and offered rooms for travelers."
