= Gibault =

Gibault is a surname of French origin, derived from the ancient Germanic personal name Gibwald, composed of the elements gib, meaning 'gift', and wald, meaning 'power authority'. Among its variants are Gibeau, Gibaut, and Gebo, an Americanized spelling. Notable people with the surname include:

- Claire Gibault (born 1945), French conductor and politician
- Pierre Gibault (1737–1802), French-Canadian Jesuit missionary and priest

== See also ==
- Gibault Catholic High School, a private Roman Catholic high school in Waterloo, Illinois
- Gibault School for Boys, a former school for juvenile offenders in Terre Haute, Indiana
