= Francis Rahrer House =

Historic house in Montana, United States

- U.S. National Register of Historic Places
- Location within Montana
- Location: 309 School St., Fromberg, Montana
- Coordinates: 45°23′36″N 108°54′40″W
- Area: less than one acre
- Built: 1921
- Built by: W.C. Parker
- Architectural style: Bungalow/craftsman
- MPS: Fromberg MPS
- NRHP reference No.: 92001786
- Added to NRHP: January 28, 1993

The Francis Rahrer House, at 309 School St. in Fromberg, Montana, was built in 1921. It was listed on the National Register of Historic Places in 1993.

It is a one-and-a-half-story wood frame Craftsman-style house, upon a stone foundation. Its front porch, which runs nearly all the way across the house, was enclosed in 1937 with fixed windows.

It was built by carpenter W.C. Parker.

The listing included a second contributing building, a garage also built in 1921.
