= Corey House (Bridger, Montana) =

Historic house in Montana, United States

- U.S. National Register of Historic Places
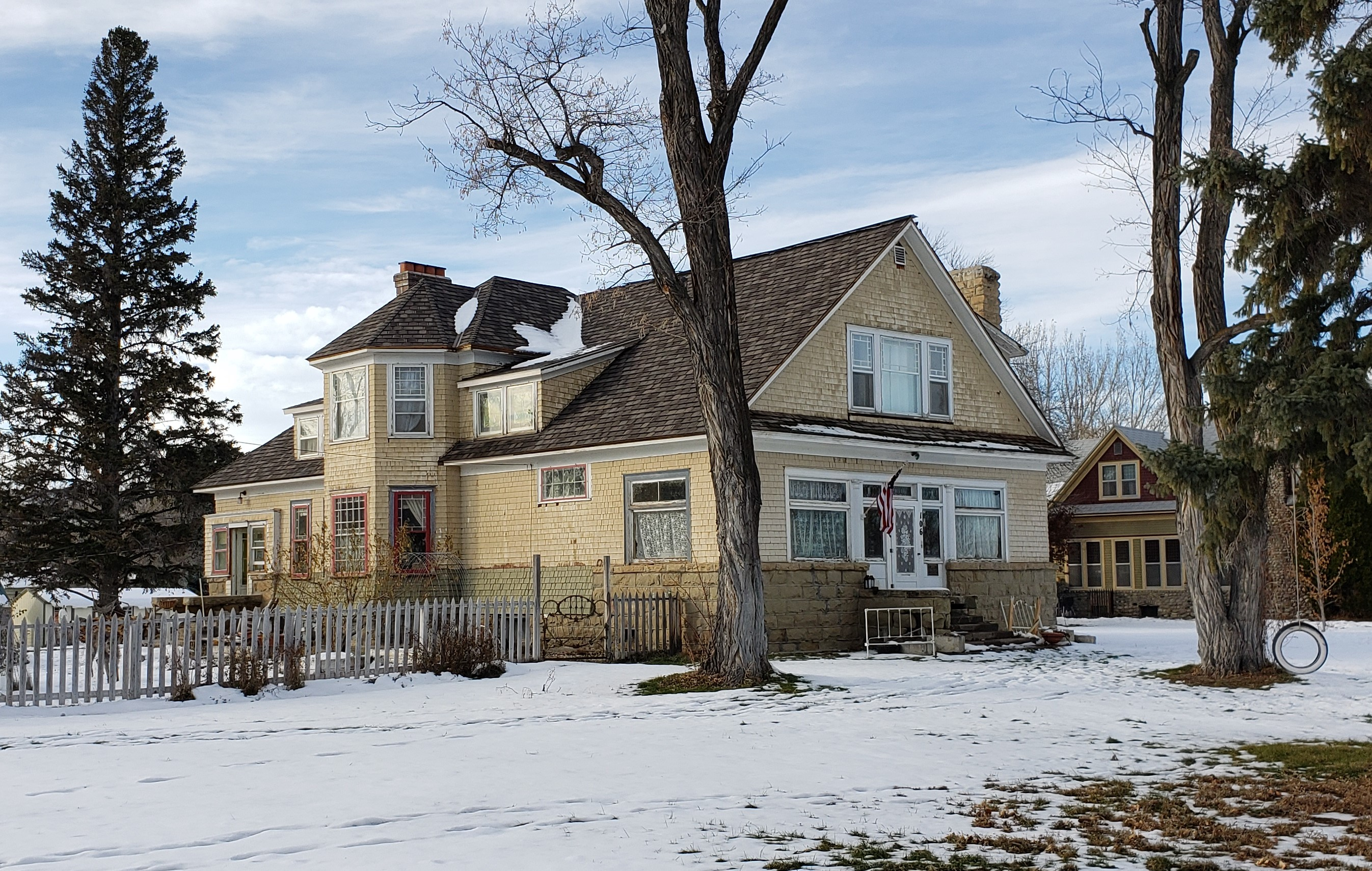

- Location within Montana Location within the United States
- Location: 106 N. E St., Bridger, Montana
- Coordinates: 45°17′46″N 108°54′21″W
- Area: less than one acre
- Built: 1906
- Built by: Crool, R.R.
- Architectural style: Bungalow/craftsman
- MPS: Bridger MRA
- NRHP reference No.: 87001219
- Added to NRHP: July 21, 1987

The Corey House, at 106 N. E St. in Bridger, Montana, was listed on the National Register of Historic Places in 1987.

It was deemed "architecturally significant as a distinctive example of an Arts and Crafts style residence in Bridger". It was built in 1907 for developer L.A. Corey by builder R.R. Crool.

It stands adjacent to Arts and Crafts-style Glidden House, also National Register-listed.
