= Glidden Mercantile =

- U.S. National Register of Historic Places
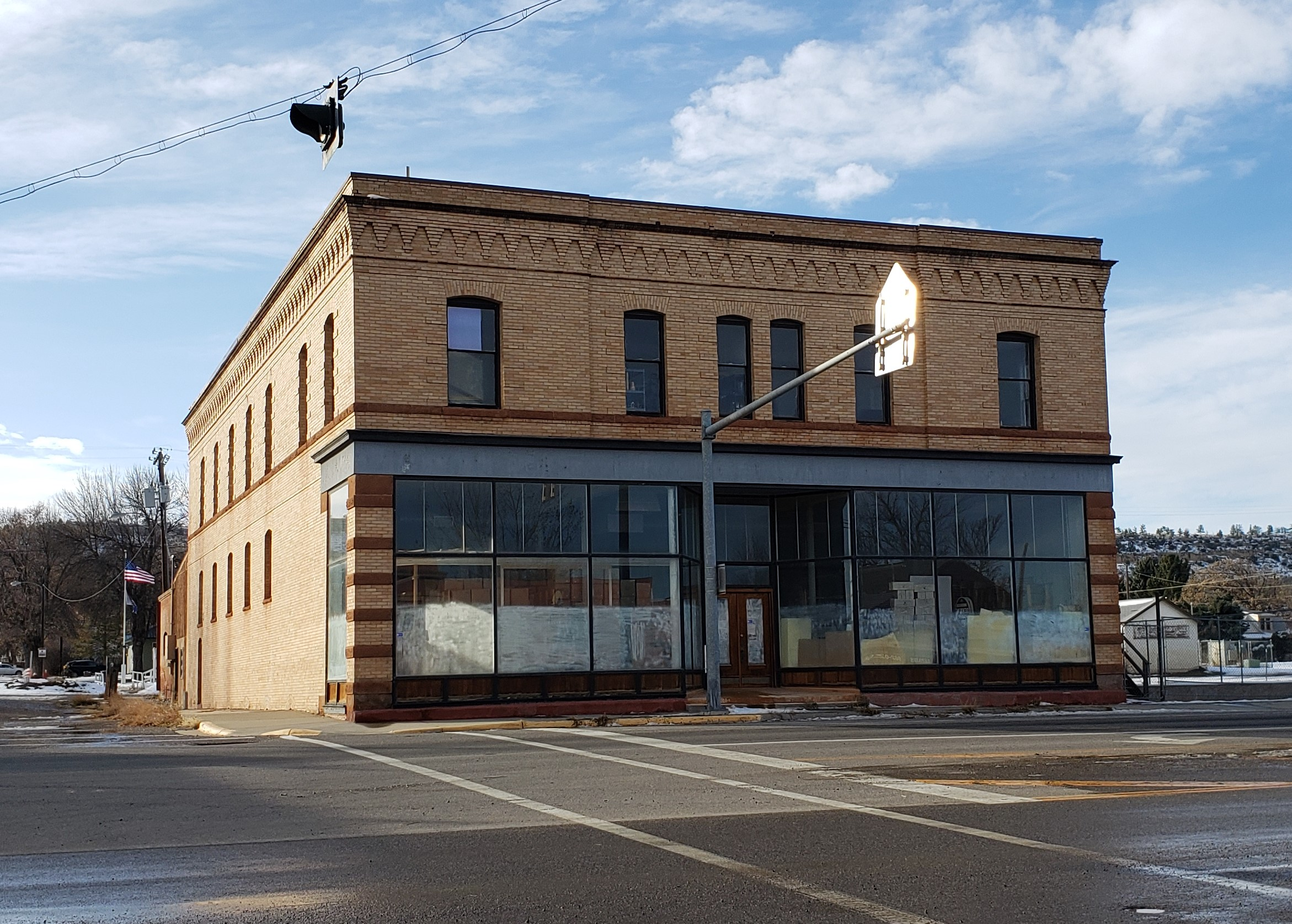

- Location within Montana
- Location: 102 N. Main, Bridger, Montana
- Coordinates: 45°17′46″N 108°54′49″W
- Area: less than one acre
- Built: 1905
- Built by: R.R. Croal
- Architect: J.G. Link
- MPS: Bridger MRA
- NRHP reference No.: 87001237
- Added to NRHP: September 15, 1987

Glidden Mercantile, at 102 N. Main in Bridger, Montana, was built in 1905. It was listed on the National Register of Historic Places in 1987.

It is a two-story 6,000 square feet (560 m^{2}) furniture factory building. It was designed by architect J.G. Link of Billings, Montana, who was charged with creating" a store that was spacious, fireproof, and dust proof."

It has also been known as Yellowstone Furniture Factory.

== See also ==
- Glidden House, also in Bridger and listed on the National Register
