= Gibeau =

Gibeau is a surname of French origin, a variant of Gibault and Gibeault, which are derived from the ancient Germanic personal name Gibwald, composed of the elements gib, meaning 'gift', and wald, meaning 'power authority'. Notable people with the surname include:

- Jean-Marc Gibeau, Canadian politician
- Marie Gibeau (1950–2002), Canadian politician

== See also ==
- Gibeau Orange Julep, a roadside attraction and fast food restaurant in Montreal, Quebec
- Gebo (surname), a cognate
- Gibaut, a cognate
