= Baldwin Building =

- U.S. National Register of Historic Places
- Location within Montana Location within the United States
- Location: Jct. of W. River St. and Harley Ave., Fromberg, Montana
- Coordinates: 45°23′31″N 108°54′25″W
- Area: less than one acre
- Built: 1911
- Architectural style: False-front commercial
- MPS: Fromberg MPS
- NRHP reference No.: 92001777
- Added to NRHP: January 28, 1993

The Baldwin Building is a site on the National Register of Historic Places located in Fromberg, Montana. It was added to the Register on January 28, 1993.

The original owner, C.J. Baldwin, had both a buggy implement dealership and lumber company under two false fronts. In 1919 he began using the building for a Ford dealership. In 1936 the building was purchased by two mechanics and became a gas station and garage. At this time a new store front was constructed and both the buildings joined under a single false-front.
