= Forsman House =

Historic house in Montana, United States

- U.S. National Register of Historic Places
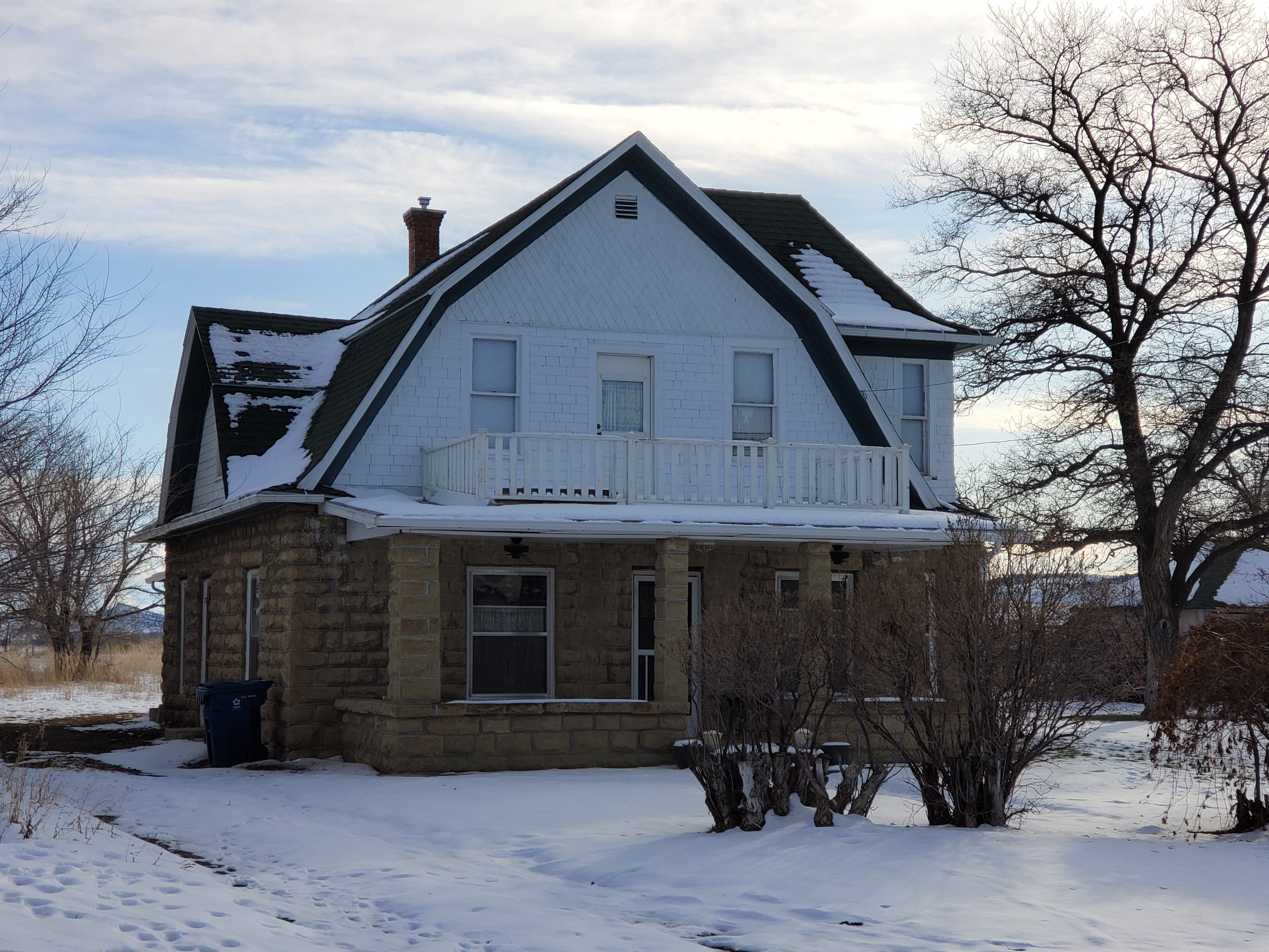

- Location within Montana Location within the United States
- Location: 406 E. Carbon Ave., Bridger, Montana
- Coordinates: 45°17′35″N 108°54′29″W
- Area: less than one acre
- Built: 1907
- Built by: Forsman, Eric; Levander, Maurice
- MPS: Bridger MRA
- NRHP reference No.: 87001233
- Added to NRHP: July 21, 1987

The Forsman House, at 406 E. Carbon Ave. in Bridger, Montana, was built in 1907. It was listed on the National Register of Historic Places in 1987.

It is a one-and-a-half-story house with a gambrel roof pierced by dormers, and a two-story hipped roof bay. It was built by Eric Forsman and Mauritz Levander, with sandstone block construction on the first floor and wood-frame construction above. It has "cottage windows" with stained glass transoms, and it has decorative diamond-shaped shinglework in the gambrel gable ends.

It was deemed significant "as a distinctive example of sandstone architecture" and "one of the finest, early 20th century houses in Bridger". It is in fact the only house in Bridger built of the locally quarried sandstone. The house's design resembles those promoted in builders' manuals and published house plan books of the time.

Forsman was an immigrant stonemason from Sweden. He also laid the stone for the Bridger Coal and Improvement Company's largish (35 by 100 feet (11 m × 30 m)) machine shop building, in 1911. Levander, also from Sweden, was a house carpenter who boarded with Forsman and likely contributed to the building of this house.
