= Henry Gebo House =

Historic house in Montana, United States

- U.S. National Register of Historic Places
- Location within Montana
- Location: East of Bridger, Bridger, Montana
- Coordinates: 45.298845°N 108.899099°W
- Area: 4 acres (1.6 ha)
- Built: 1909
- Built by: Henry Gebo
- Architectural style: Queen Anne
- MPS: Bridger MRA
- NRHP reference No.: 87001234
- Added to NRHP: July 21, 1987

The Henry Gebo House, in Carbon County, Montana east of Bridger, Montana, was built in 1909. It was listed on the National Register of Historic Places in 1987.

It was built by or for Henry Gebo, and is Queen Anne in style.

It is on a rise overlooking the Clarks Fork of the Yellowstone River, just outside the city limits of Bridger, which do not extend to the river itself. In 1987 it was the largest house in the area.

The house may no longer exist in 2019, which is suggested by satellite view imagery of the approximate location and street view imagery from E. Bridge St. crossing the river, which shows what looks like a modern house at the location. Or that may be the house, renovated.
