= Wool Warehouse =

- U.S. National Register of Historic Places
- Location within Montana Location within the United States
- Location: E. Bridger, Bridger, Montana
- Coordinates: 45°17′44″N 108°54′32″W
- Area: less than one acre
- Built: 1900
- Built by: Northern Pacific Railway Company
- MPS: Bridger MRA
- NRHP reference No.: 87001246
- Added to NRHP: July 21, 1987

The Wool Warehouse, on E. Bridger in Bridger, Montana, was built around 1900. It was listed on the National Register of Historic Places in 1987.

It was built and owned by the Northern Pacific Railway Company. It is a large wood-frame building on a concrete foundation, adjacent to the railroad bed of a former Northern Pacific line.

In 1899, a million pounds of wool was shipped from Carbon County and Montana was the leading wool producer in the world during the first decade of the 1900s, with Carbon County ranked ninth in county contributions in the state. Half of the assessed value of all property in the county was in cattle and sheep, in 1904.

An elevated portion of the building was added on, in the 1920s, when the warehouse was converted to a bean cleaning facility.

It has also been known as the Glidden Mercantile Warehouse.
