= IOOF Hall and Fromberg Co-operative Mercantile Building =

- U.S. National Register of Historic Places
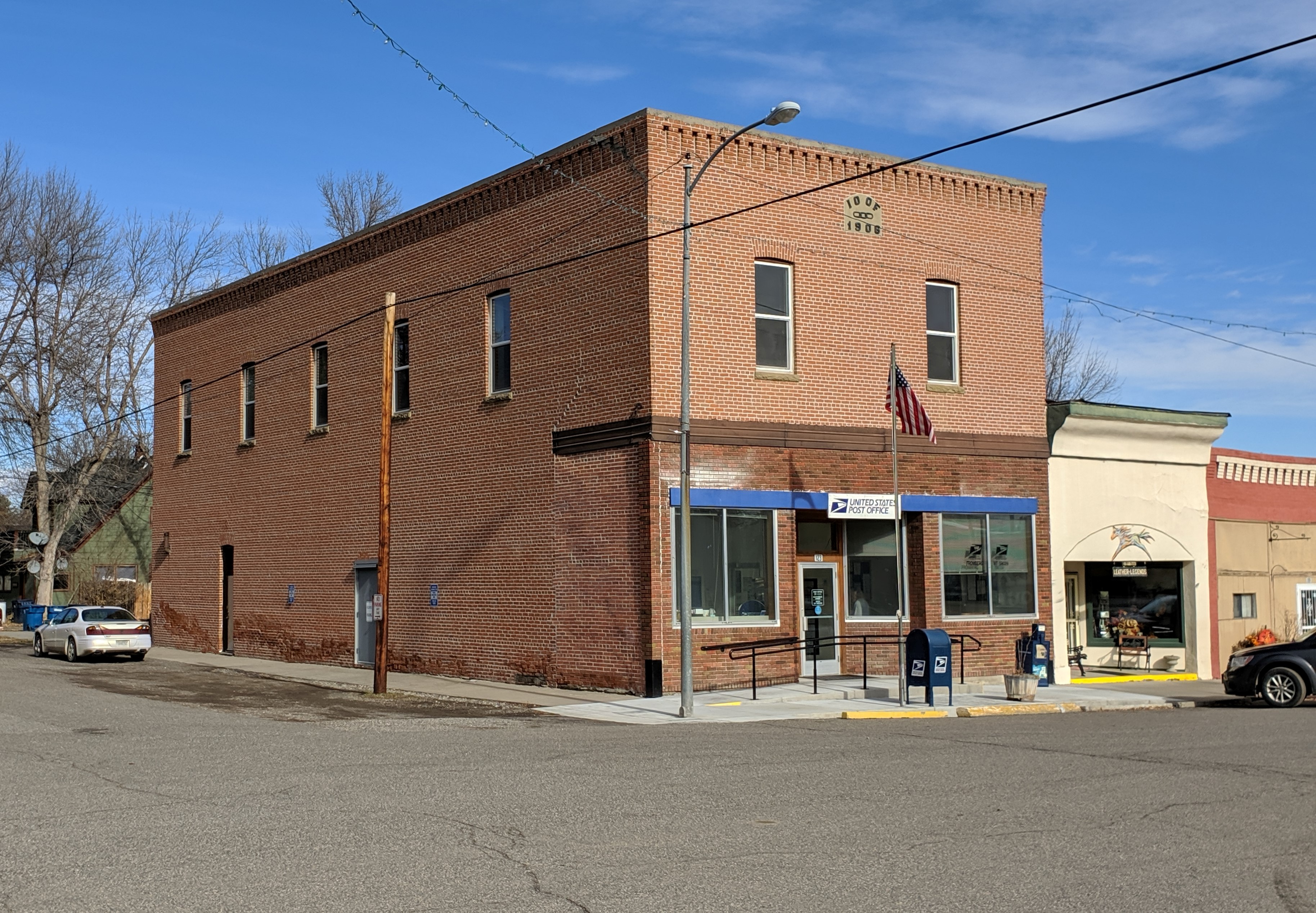

- Location within Montana Location within the United States
- Location: 123 W. River St., Fromberg, Montana
- Coordinates: 45°23′31″N 108°54′31″W
- Area: less than one acre
- Built: 1906
- Architect: Gibson, John
- Architectural style: Flat roof two-story brick
- MPS: Fromberg MPS
- NRHP reference No.: 92001778
- Added to NRHP: January 28, 1993

The IOOF Hall and Fromberg Co-operative Mercantile Building was built in 1906 at the west end of downtown Fromberg, Montana. It was the first brick building in Fromberg and served historically as a department store and as a meeting hall. It was listed on the National Register of Historic Places in 1993.

It is a two-story flat-roofed building constructed of brick laid in English bond. It has parapets and corbeled cornices; the front parapet has a concrete medallion holding metal figures "IOOF," "1906," and the Odd Fellows emblem.

A 1992 review of historic resources in Fromberg commented that "Little is known about the organizational activities of the I.O.O.F in Fromberg", beyond that the I.O.O.F. was the first fraternal organization in Fromberg and that it financed construction of the building in 1906, and then was active for about 20 years.
