= Raymond Hough House =

Historic house in Montana, United States

- U.S. National Register of Historic Places
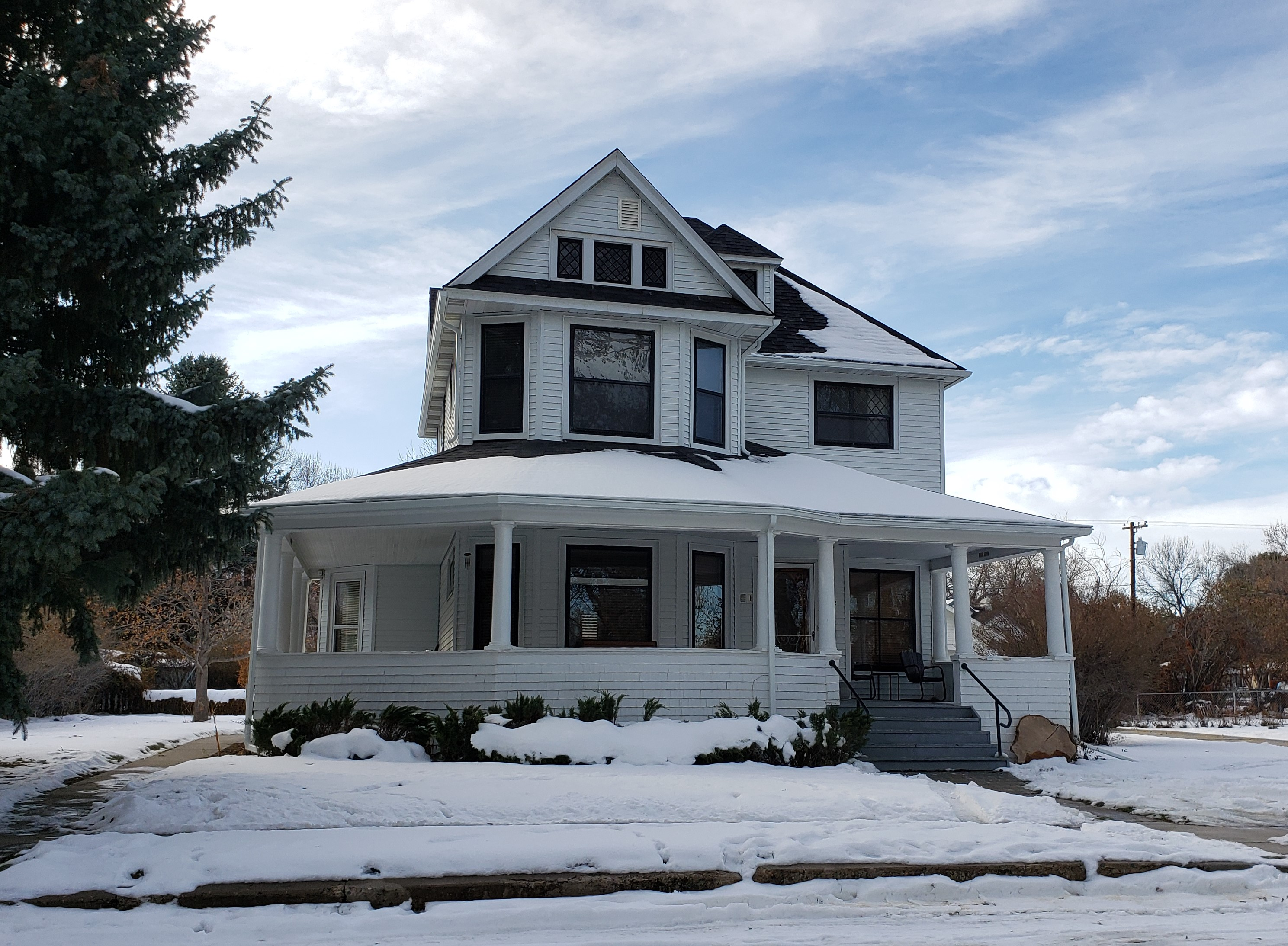
- Location: 312 S. Second, Bridger, Montana
- Coordinates: 45°17′35″N 108°54′54″W
- Area: less than one acre
- Built: 1910
- Architectural style: Colonial Revival, Queen Anne
- MPS: Bridger MRA
- NRHP reference No.: 87001242
- Added to NRHP: September 15, 1987

The Raymond Hough House, at 312 S. 2nd in Bridger, Montana, was built in 1910. It was listed on the National Register of Historic Places in 1987.

It is a two-story wood-frame house. The house has elements of Colonial Revival and Queen Anne style.
