= Gebo (surname) =

Gebo is a surname, an Americanized spelling of French Gibault or any of its numerous variants, such as Gibeault, Gibeau, Gibaut, or Gibeaut, which are derived from the ancient Germanic personal name Gibwald, composed of the elements gib, meaning 'gift', and wald, meaning 'power authority'. Notable people with the surname include:

- Kelly Gebo (born 1970), American epidemiologist and infectious disease specialist
- Samuel Gebo (1862–1940), American entrepreneur

== See also ==
- Gebo (disambiguation), other uses of the term
