= Samuel Greenblatt House =

Historic house in Montana, United States

- U.S. National Register of Historic Places
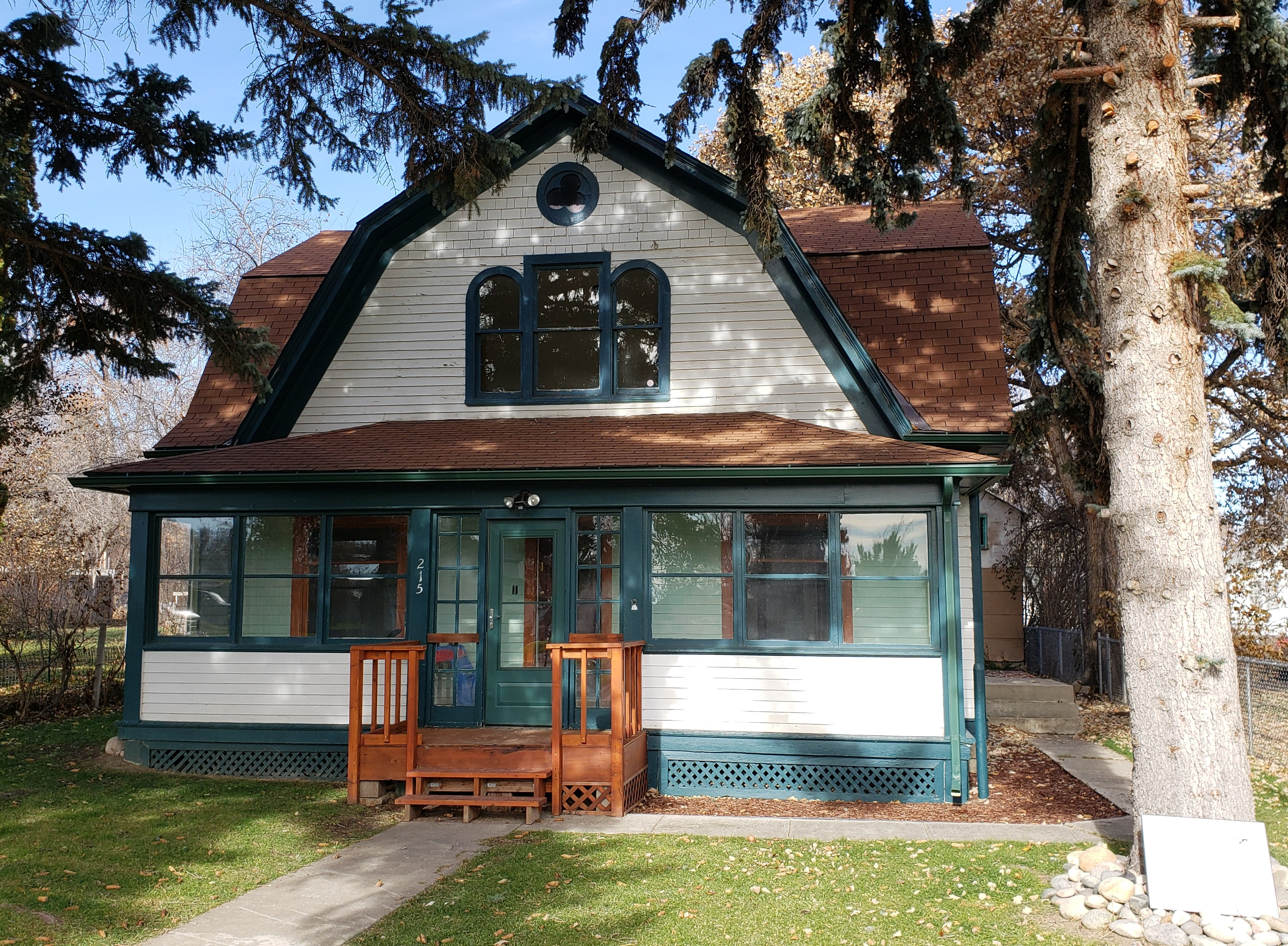

- Location within Montana Location within the United States
- Location: 215 W. River St., Fromberg, Montana
- Coordinates: 45°23′31″N 108°54′34″W
- Area: less than one acre
- Built: 1911
- Built by: W.C. Parker
- Architectural style: Colonial Revival
- MPS: Fromberg MPS
- NRHP reference No.: 92001784
- Added to NRHP: January 28, 1993

The Samuel Greenblatt House, at 215 W. River St. in Fromberg, Montana, was built in 1911. It was listed on the National Register of Historic Places in 1993.

It is a 1 1/2-story wood-frame Colonial Revival-style house, built by carpenter W.C. Parker.

It was deemed notable for its associations with the growth and emergence of Fromberg and with Samuel Greenblatt, a Russian immigrant who was an important businessman in Fromberg, as well as for being "an outstanding example of the Colonial Revival style as well as the craftsmanship of W.C. Parker". Samuel Greenblatt opened one of the first businesses in Fromberg in 1900, is credited with obtaining establishment of the post office in 1903, and promoted the townsite. Greenblatt's store failed eventually due to competition, and in 1913 he and his family moved to Billings, Montana.

The property has two outbuildings: a garage built around 1927 and a shed built in 1934, deemed non-contributing.
