= Frank Brooder House =

Historic house in Montana, United States

- U.S. National Register of Historic Places
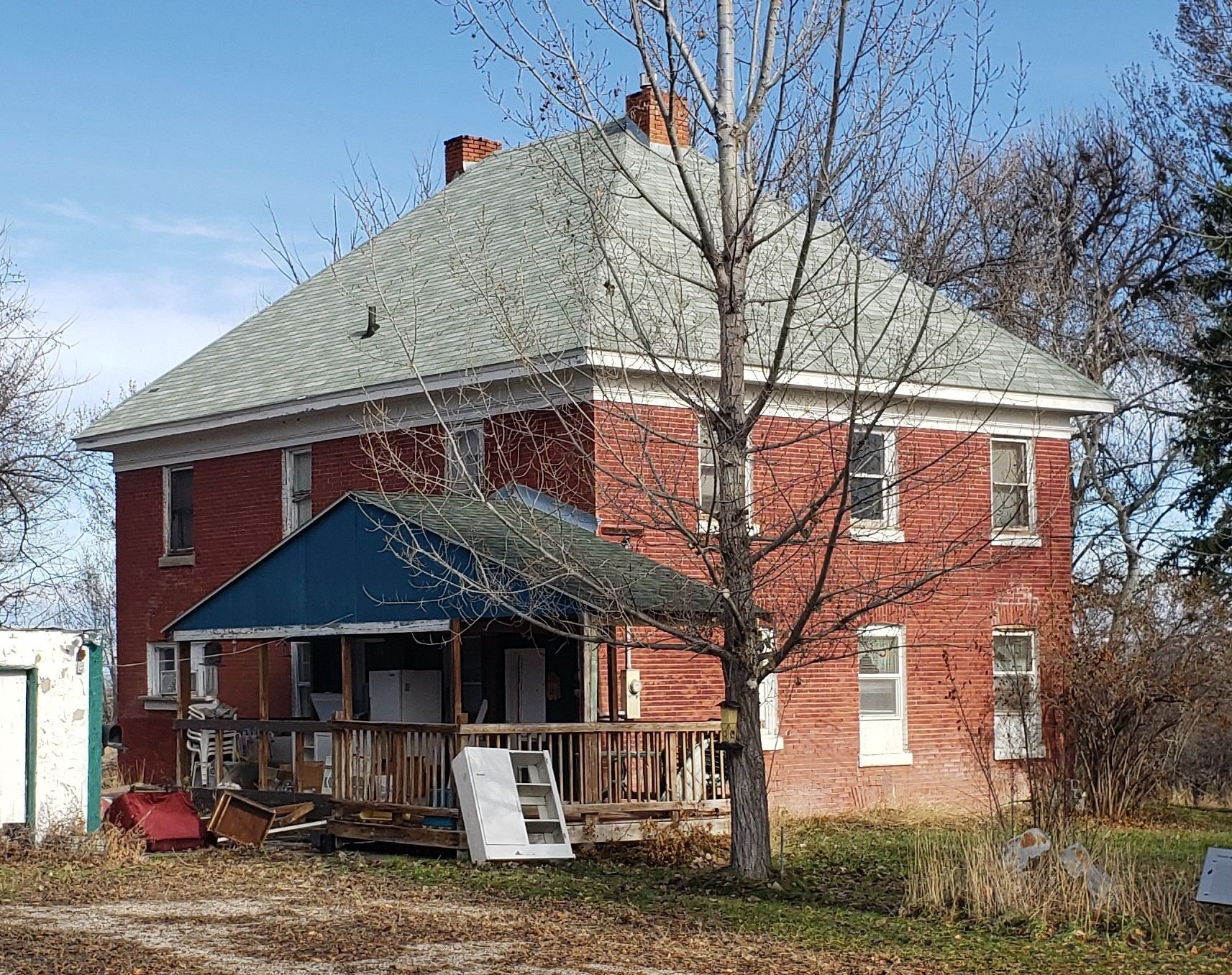

- Location within Montana Location within the United States
- Location: 303 North St., Fromberg, Montana
- Coordinates: 45°23′38″N 108°54′37″W
- Area: less than one acre
- Built: 1911
- Built by: Parker, W.C.
- Architect: McLean, Archibald
- Architectural style: Colonial Revival
- MPS: Fromberg MPS
- NRHP reference No.: 92001787
- Added to NRHP: January 28, 1993

The Frank Brooder House, at 303 North St. in Fromberg, Montana, was listed on the National Register of Historic Places in 1993.

It is a brick two-and-a-half-story square-plan Colonial Revival-style house with a hipped roof, on a brick foundation. The brick is laid in English bond.
