= Gibaut =

Gibaut is a surname of French origin, a variant of Gibault, which is derived from the ancient Germanic personal name Gibwald, composed of the elements gib, meaning 'gift', and wald, meaning 'power authority'. Notable people with the surname include:

- Ian Gibaut (born 1993), American baseball player
- Russel Gibaut (born 1963), Jersey cricketer

== See also ==
- Gibeau, a cognate
- Gebo (surname), a cognate
