= Red Lodge Communal Mausoleum =

Historic site in Carbon County, Montana

- U.S. National Register of Historic Places
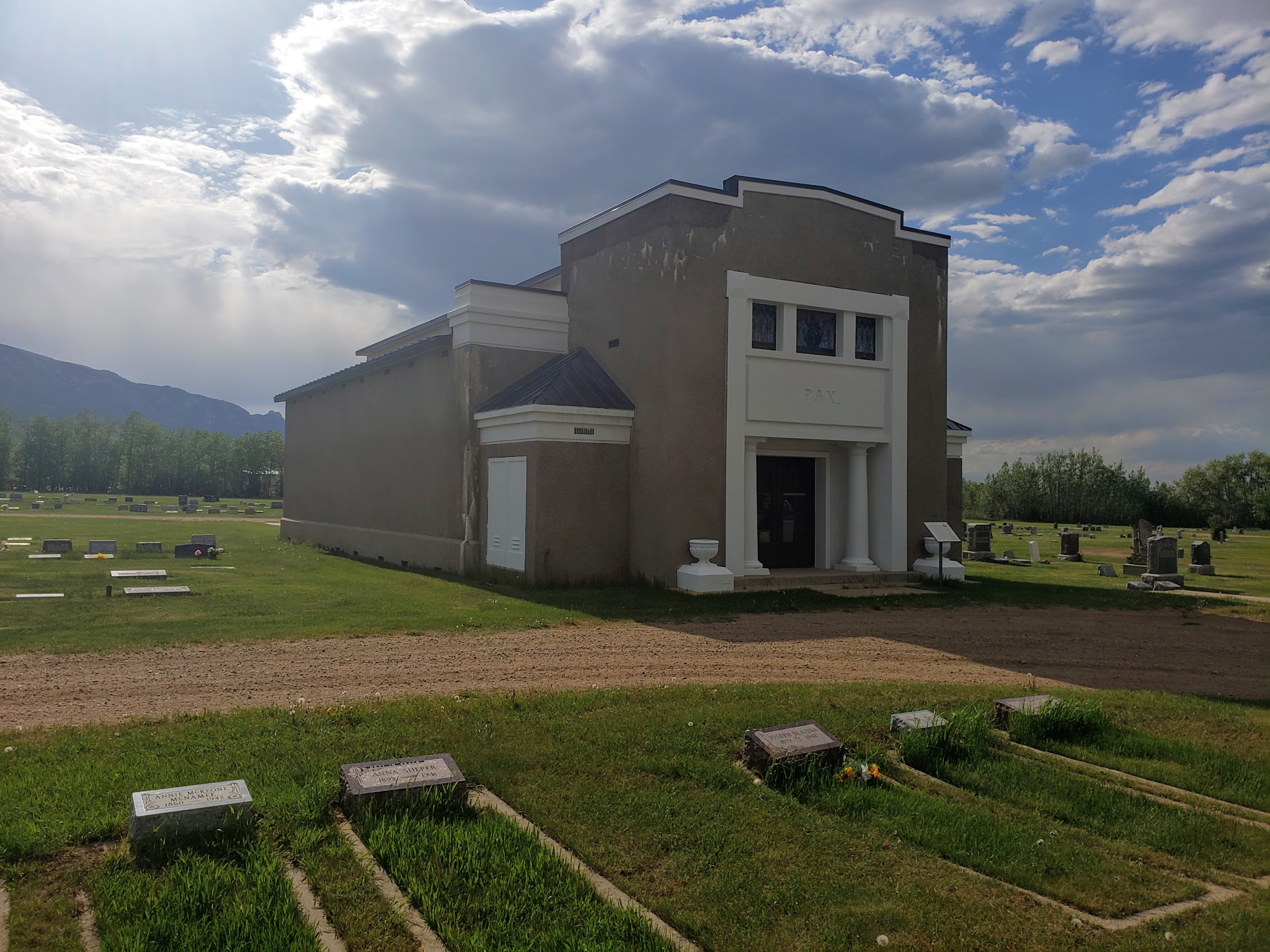

- Location within Montana Location within the United States
- Location: Montana Highway 78, near Red Lodge, Montana
- Coordinates: 45°11′41″N 109°15′41″W
- Area: less than one acre
- Built: 1922
- Built by: Consolidated Mausoleums Co.
- Architectural style: Prairie School
- NRHP reference No.: 11000114
- Added to NRHP: March 21, 2011

The Red Lodge Communal Mausoleum is in the Red Lodge City Cemetery on Montana Highway 78 in Carbon County, Montana, near Red Lodge, Montana. It was built in 1922. It was listed on the National Register of Historic Places in 2011.

It is a 232-crypt community mausoleum built in the early 1920s for the citizens in and around the City of Red Lodge, Montana. It is within the 4.9 acres (2.0 ha) Catholic Cemetery portion of the overall cemetery, which has an additional 6 acres (2.4 ha), and it is the largest structure.

It was built by the Consolidated Mausoleums Company of Billings, Montana in a modified cruciform plan. It includes a chapel.

It was deemed significant as "a very well-preserved and rare example of a community mausoleum in Montana from the early twentieth century. Only two other community mausoleums are known to have been built in the state during the era, one in Billings and the other in Great Falls. Of the three, only the Red Lodge and Billings facilities retain historic integrity. / The Red Lodge Communal Mausoleum also has architectural significance as an important local expression of one of the few solely American architectural forms, the Prairie School Style. Components of the building reflective of the style include its form (i.e., a tall central mass flanked by lower subordinate wings), a heavy application of rough textured stucco on the exterior walls and horizontal rows of windows."
