= Camp Senia Historic District =

Historic district in Montana, United States

- U.S. National Register of Historic Places
- U.S. Historic district
- Location within Montana Location within the United States
- Nearest city: Red Lodge, Montana
- Coordinates: 45°10′15″N 109°28′34″W
- Architect: Alfred Croonquist
- NRHP reference No.: 88000441 (original); 15000511 (increase)

Significant dates
- Added to NRHP: April 14, 1988
- Boundary increase: August 10, 2015

Camp Senia is a district of historic cabins near Red Lodge, Montana. Five of the approximately 5 cabins were burned on July 29, 2008, during the Cascade Fire, a large forest fire. The camp was originally a dude ranch.
