= Hi Bug Historic District =

Historic district in Montana, United States

- U.S. National Register of Historic Places
- U.S. Historic district
- Location within Montana Location within the United States
- Location: Roughly bounded by W. Third St., N. Villard Ave., W. Eighth St., and N. Word Ave., Red Lodge, Montana
- Coordinates: 45°11′35″N 109°14′58″W
- Area: 36 acres (15 ha)
- Architect: Multiple
- Architectural style: Colonial Revival, Bungalow/Craftsman, Queen Anne
- NRHP reference No.: 86001932
- Added to NRHP: July 23, 1986

The Hi Bug Historic District is a residential area of Red Lodge, Montana. The district is on the north side of Villard Avenue (U.S. Route 212) and includes portions of Hauser Avenue. The district includes a variety of mansions and Victorian cottages in the Queen Anne and Colonial Revival styles. The name is thought to be derived from the affluence of the neighborhood's residents in the early 1900s.

The Hi Bug Historic District was listed on the National Register of Historic Places on July 13, 1986. The listing included 80 contributing resources and 18 non-contributing ones.
