= Fromberg Concrete Arch Bridge =

- U.S. National Register of Historic Places
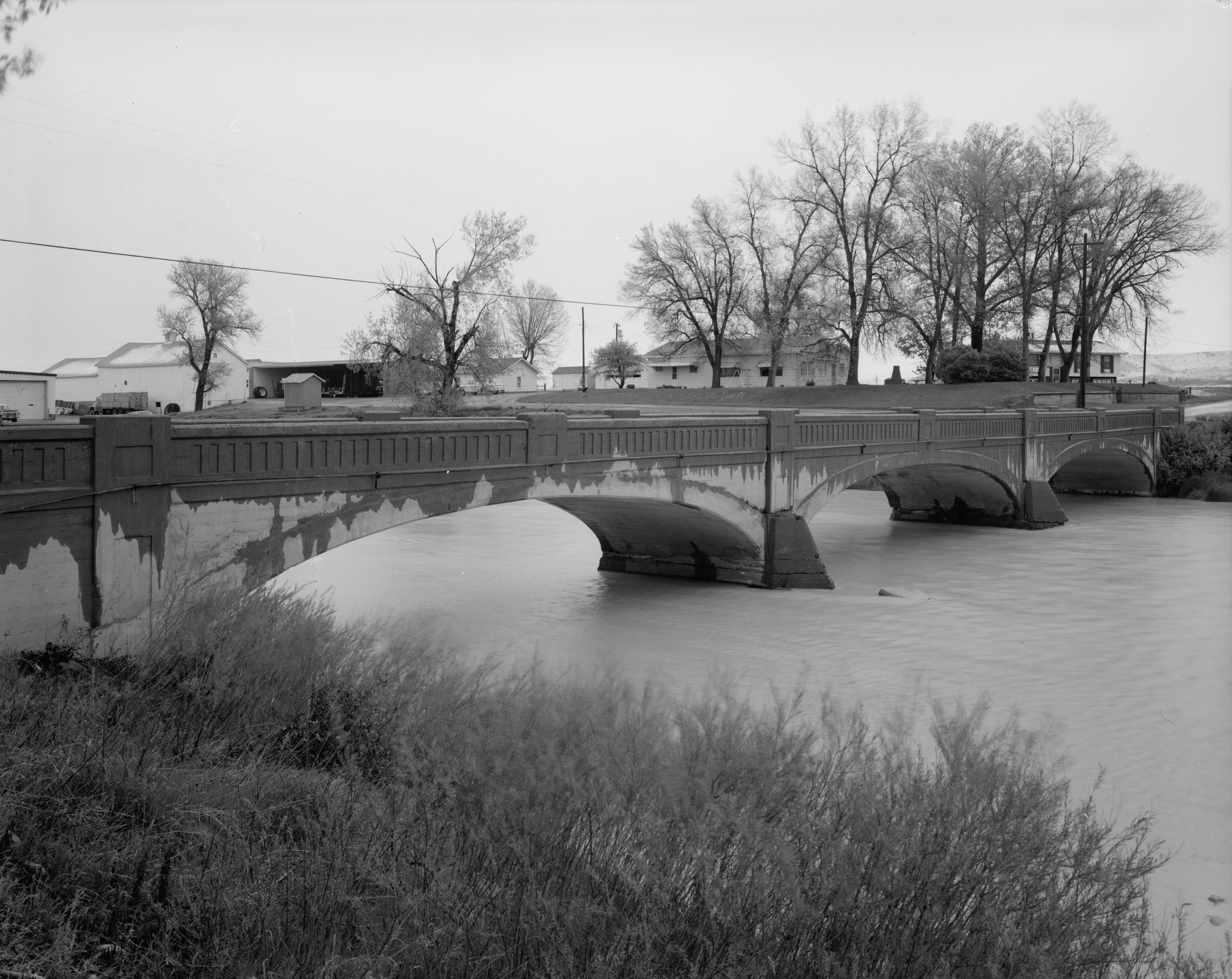
- 1980 HAER photo

- Location within Montana Location within the United States
- Location: River Street over Clarks Fork Yellowstone River, Fromberg, Montana
- Coordinates: 45°23′30″N 108°53′42″W
- Area: less than one acre
- Built: 1914
- Built by: Beley Construction Company
- Architect: C. A. Gibson
- Architectural style: Concrete arch bridge
- MPS: Fromberg MPS
- NRHP reference No.: 92001790
- Added to NRHP: January 28, 1993

The Fromberg Concrete Arch Bridge, in Fromberg, Montana, was built in 1914. It was listed on the National Register of Historic Places in 1993. It carries River Street over the Clarks Fork Yellowstone River.

It is a three-span concrete deck arch bridge designed by Carbon County, Montana, surveyor C. A. Gibson and was "quite advanced for the time": it has "flattened parabolic arches with a rise to span ratio of 1 to 7." At its completion it was the largest concrete bridge in the state.

In 1993 it was the oldest multi-arch concrete bridge surviving in the state.

== See also ==
- List of bridges documented by the Historic American Engineering Record in Montana
