= Southern Hotel (Joliet, Montana) =

- U.S. National Register of Historic Places
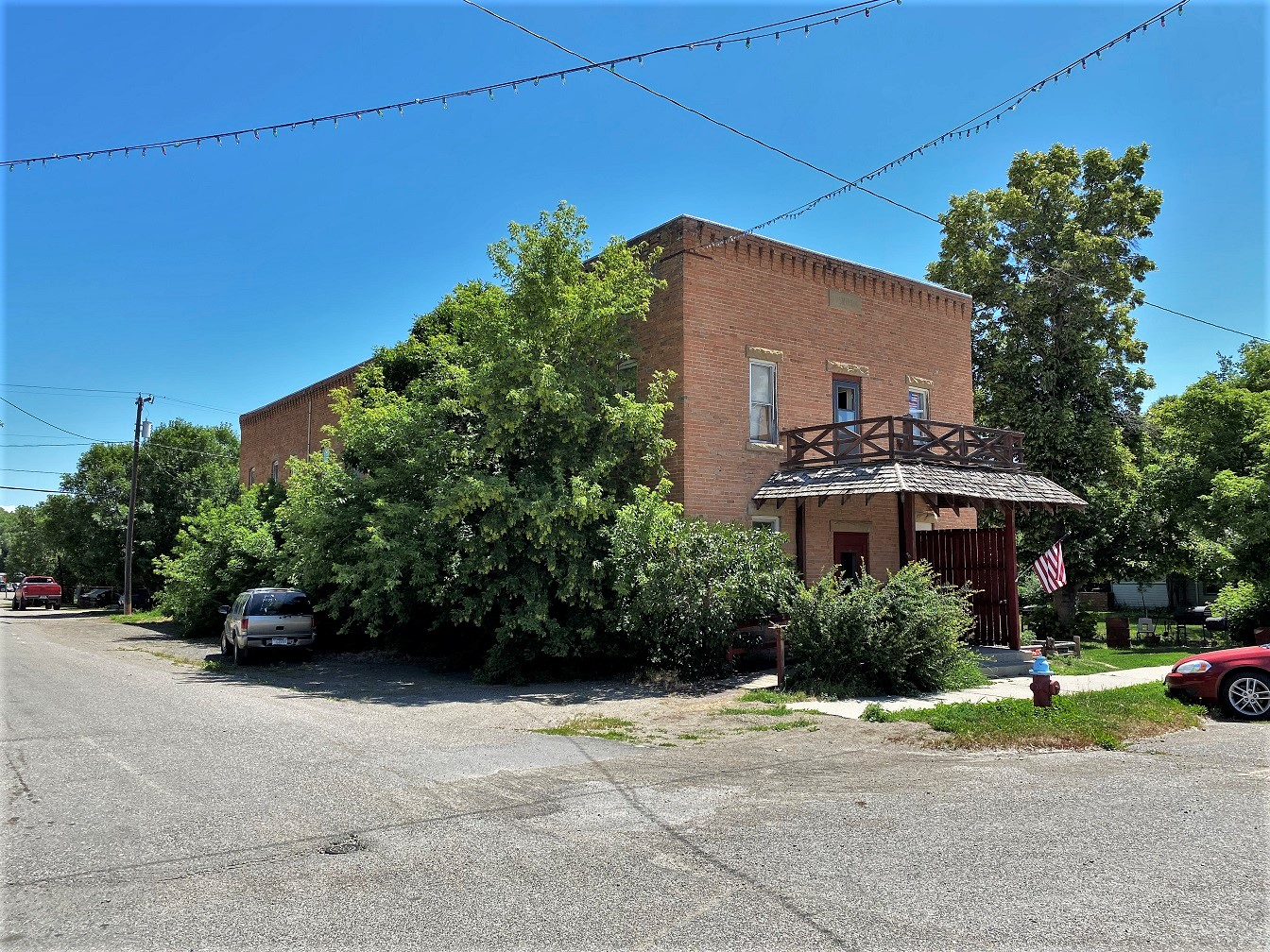

- Location within Montana Location within the United States
- Location: Main St. Joliet, Montana
- Coordinates: 45°29′05″N 108°58′09″W
- Area: less than one acre
- Built: 1906
- Built by: Wenzel & Marshall
- MPS: Joliet Montana MRA
- NRHP reference No.: 86000891
- Added to NRHP: May 2, 1986

The Southern Hotel, on Main St. in Joliet, Montana, was built in 1906. It was listed on the National Register of Historic Places in 1986.

It is a two-story brick building, with brick laid in common bond, upon an irregular sandstone ashlar foundation. It is one of the most significant buildings in the town.

It was the first hotel in town, and helped in the development of the town as a center of an agricultural area. It was built for Luther S. Smith by contractors Wenzel & Marshall, of Bear Creek, Montana. A block on the building reads "19 SMITH 06".
