= Gebo Cemetery =

Historic site in Carbon County, Montana

- U.S. National Register of Historic Places
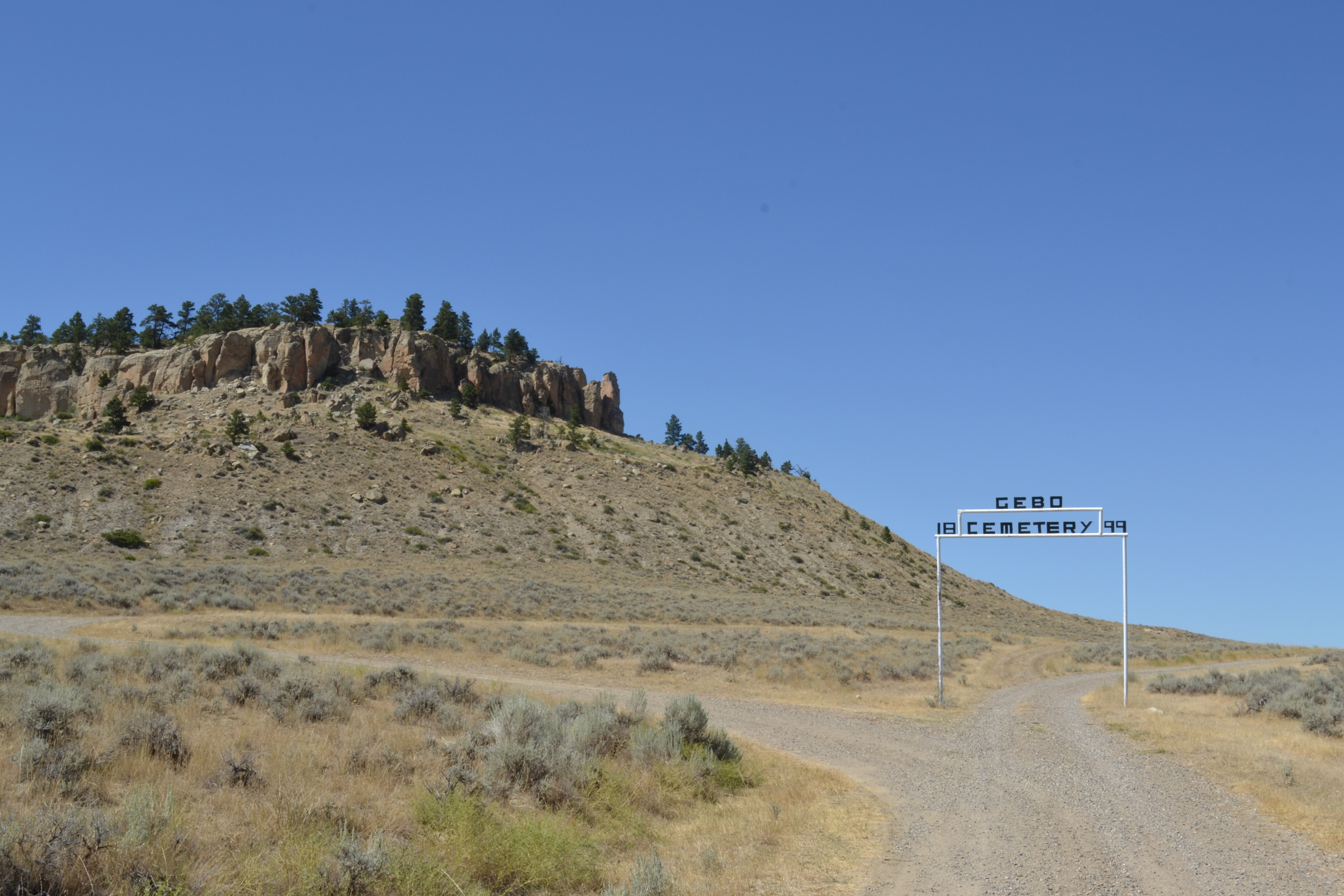

- Location within Montana Location within the United States
- Nearest city: Fromberg, Montana
- Coordinates: 45°24′12″N 108°55′23″W
- Area: 3.3 acres (1.3 ha)
- Built: 1899
- NRHP reference No.: 93000291
- Added to NRHP: April 8, 1993

The Gebo Cemetery, in Carbon County, Montana, near Fromberg, was established in 1899 to serve the coal-mining town of Gebo, which had population of 500 to 1,000 in the early 1900s but was virtually abandoned after the Gebo Mine ceased operation in 1912. It was listed on the National Register of Historic Places in 1993.

It is located about 1 mile (1.6 km) north-northwest of Fromberg, on a county road linking Fromberg and Gebo. The coal-mining town of Gebo was about .5 miles (0.80 km) east.

The cemetery has about 200 graves. It "is on a gentle slope overgrown with sagebrush, sparse grasses and thistle. This location affords a dramatic and panoramic view of the Clarks Fork of the Yellowstone River Valley to the east and town of Fromberg to the southeast. Steep sandstone cliffs rise to the west. The square plot includes 3.25 acres [1.32 ha] of land and is encompassed by a wire and post fence; an ornate wire gate set between tall metal trusses is on the west. A 2.09-acre [0.85 ha] plot was added to the historic cemetery in 1963, but this area has yet to be used as a burial site."

It includes three iron crosses, which were "grave markers associated with German-Russian Catholics who emigrated from the Black Sea region of Russia. The most distinguished of these is an iron cross with tracery and metal wording in German. It marks the grave of German immigrant Adam Heiser who died in 1916. Three other plots have concrete headstones embedded with bits of colored glass; at least two of these are also associated with German-Russian immigrants."
