= John Blewett House =

Historic house in Montana, United States

- U.S. National Register of Historic Places
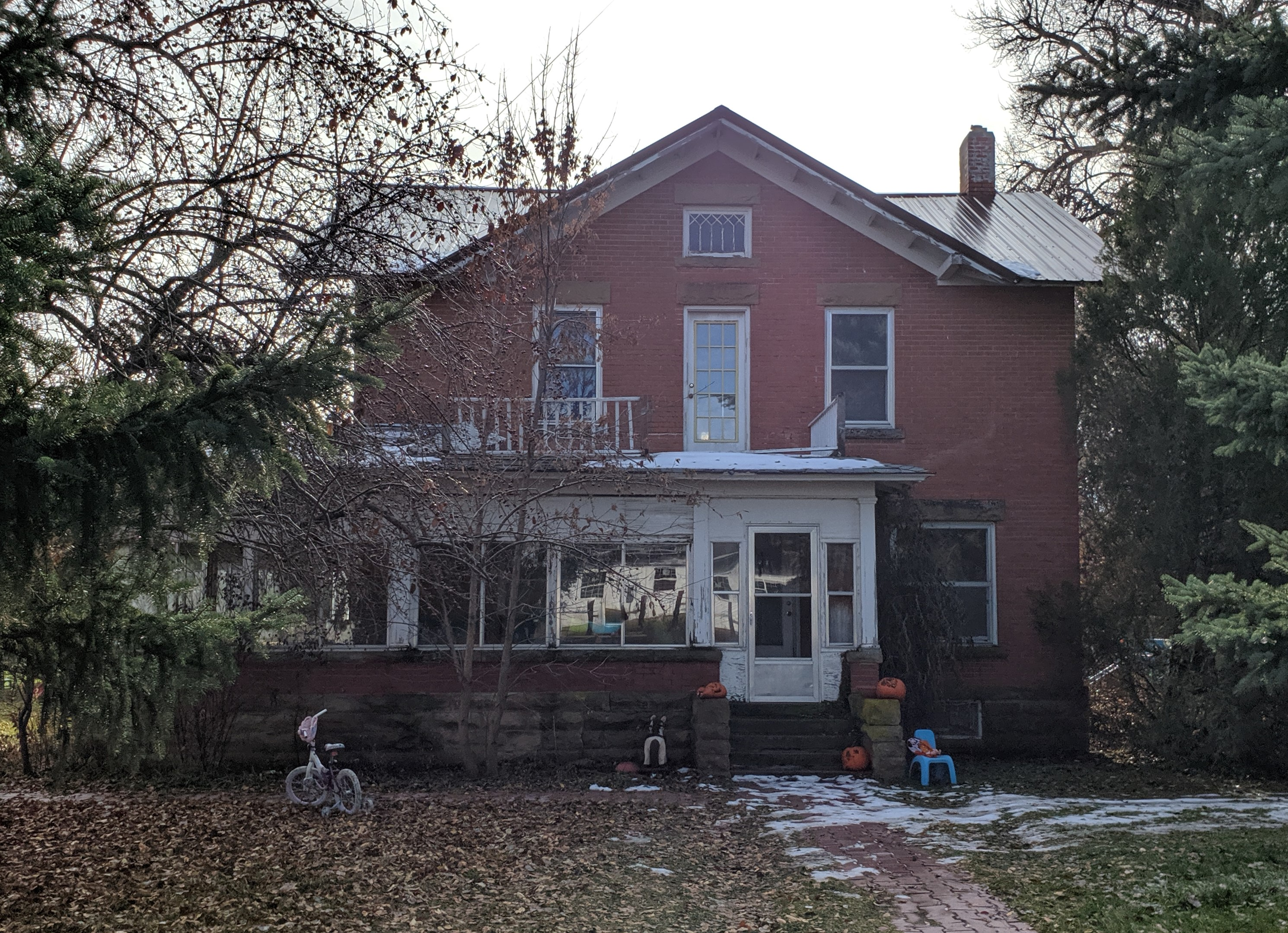
- Location: 2411 E. River St., Fromberg, Montana
- Coordinates: 45°23′30″N 108°54′05″W
- Area: less than one acre
- Built: 1912
- Architectural style: Two-story cross-gable brick
- MPS: Fromberg MPS
- NRHP reference No.: 92001789
- Added to NRHP: January 28, 1993

The John Blewett House, located at 2411 E. River St. in Fromberg, Montana, was listed on the National Register of Historic Places in 1993.

It was deemed significant in part for its architecture, as

one of the most distinguished examples of vernacular architecture from Fromberg's boom period. The two-story brick house's straightforward massing is enlivened by a complex combination roof, sandstone foundation and window headers and lintels, and the wrap around front porch. The house serves as an excellent representation of a type of large, architecturally sophisticated house common to the period and remains as the most impressive house ever built in the Blewett Addition.
