= Gebo, Montana =

Coalville, Montana
- Unincorporated community
- Nickname: Gebo
- Location within Montana Location within the United States
- Coordinates: 45.3999472°N 108.9229232°W
- Country: United States
- State: Montana
- County: Carbon
- Time zone: UTC-7 (Mountain (MST))
  - Summer (DST): UTC-6 (MDT)
- GNIS feature ID: 1726660

Coalville, Montana, also known as Gebo, Montana, was a community by the Gebo Mine, in Carbon County, Montana near Fromberg, Montana.

"Coalville (historical)" is a "Locale", identified as GNIS number 1726660 in the Geographic Names Information System, at elevation 3,711 feet (1,131 m). It had a railroad station (per GNIS number 1726660) and a post office, the "Coalville Post Office" (per GNIS number 1726661).

The mine was developed by Samuel Gebo. It attracted the Northern Pacific Railway to build a railroad line up the Clarks Fork Valley, on the Clarks Fork of the Yellowstone River.

It was the location of a boardinghouse operated by Hester E. Suydam, before she tried to have it moved to Fromberg, Montana. It was destroyed in a wind storm. The Hester E. Suydam Boarding House, a new building she had built in Fromberg, is listed on the National Register of Historic Places.

The Gebo Cemetery, also listed on the National Register, is about .5 miles (0.80 km) to the west, on the way to Fromberg.

== See also ==
- Gebo, Wyoming, a ghost town near another mine developed by Samuel Gebo
