= Rock Creek State Bank =

- U.S. National Register of Historic Places
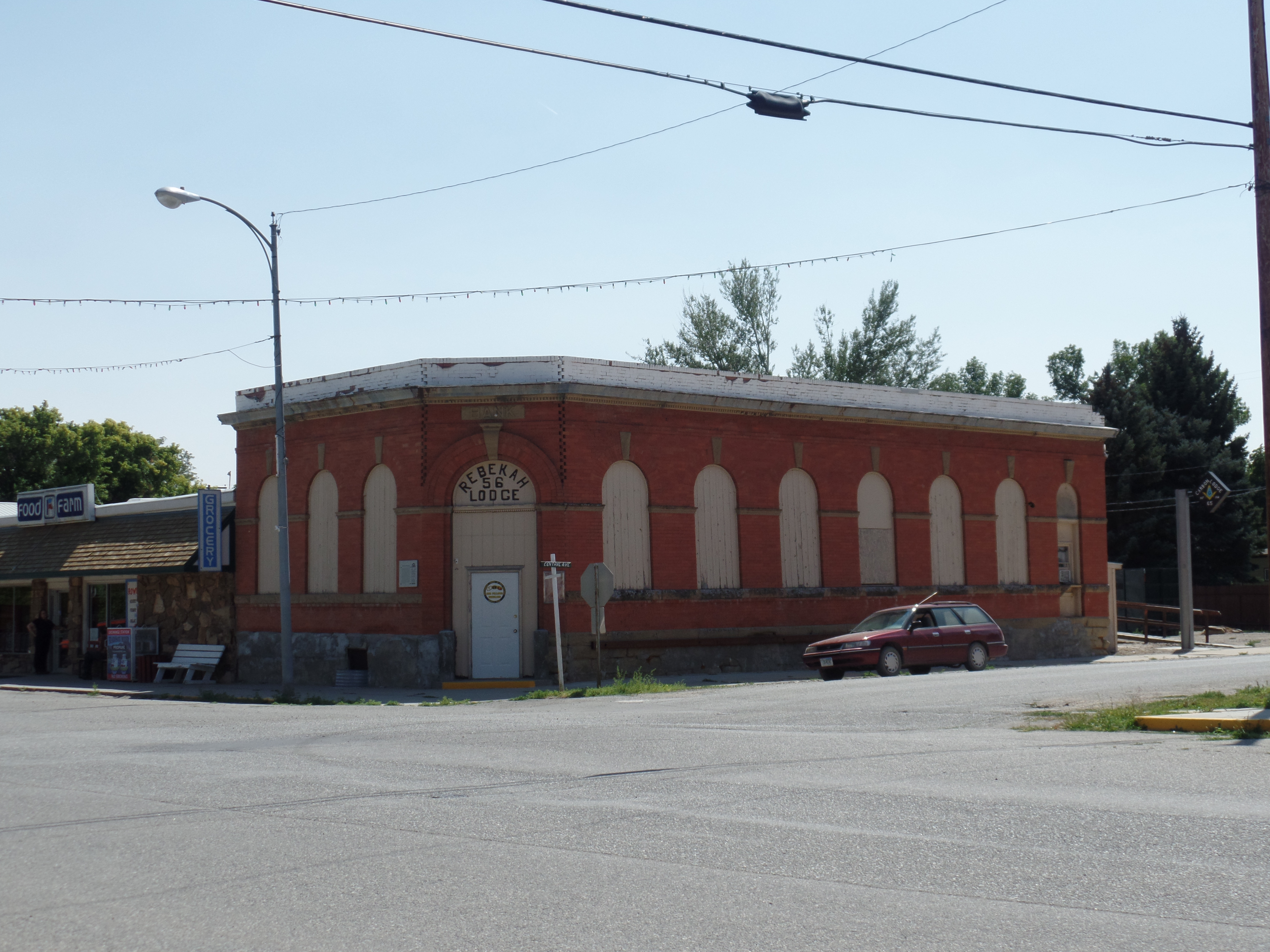
- "Rebekah Lodge 56" appears over the door.

- Location within Montana
- Location: Main St., Joliet, Montana
- Coordinates: 45°29′04″N 108°58′12″W
- Area: less than one acre
- Built: 1906
- Built by: Loftus, Patsy
- Architectural style: Romanesque
- MPS: Joliet Montana MRA
- NRHP reference No.: 86000890
- Added to NRHP: May 2, 1986

The Rock Creek State Bank, on Main St. in Joliet, Montana, was listed on the National Register of Historic Places in 1986.

It was built as a bank during 1906-07 for the Joliet Bank, which was organized in 1904. In 1985, it was a lodge hall for the Rebekah Lodge.
