= Warren, Montana =

Unincorporated community in Montana, United States

- Unincorporated community
- Interactive map of Warren, Montana
- Coordinates: 45°03′36″N 108°39′30″W
- Country: United States
- State: Montana
- County: Carbon
- Elevation: 4,420 ft (1,350 m)
- ZIP code: 59014
- Area code: 406
- GNIS feature ID: 778122

Warren is an unincorporated community in Carbon County, Montana, United States. It is situated on Montana Secondary Highway 310.

== History ==
Warren was originally a stop on the Chicago, Burlington and Quincy Railroad. It is where sugar beet refineries received limestone from Big Horn Calcium Company. The quarry in the nearby Pryor Mountains, now operated by Montana Limestone Company, continues to produce chemical grade limestone.

A post office operated in Warren from 1911 to 1953.

There are two areas of historical significance near Warren. Bad Pass Trail was used for 10,000 to 12,000 years to access bison hunting grounds and later by trappers to avoid Bighorn Canyon. Petroglyph Canyon is a sandstone canyon with numerous petroglyphs that were created by pecking tiny holes, an unusual method in Montana sites.
