= Petroglyph Canyon =

- U.S. National Register of Historic Places
- U.S. Historic district
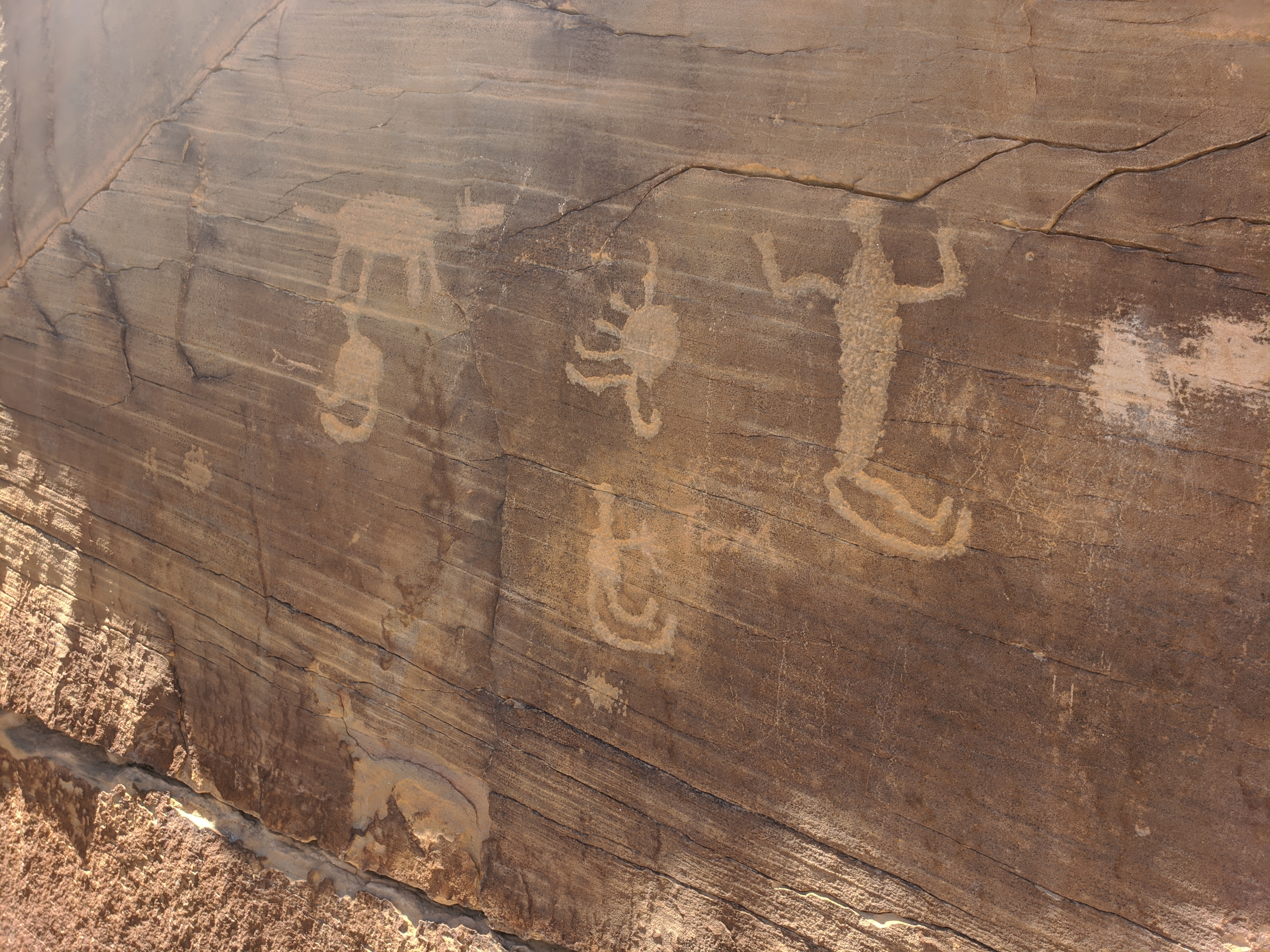

- Location within Montana Location within the United States
- Location: Southern half of Section 35, Township 9 South, Range 26 East
- Nearest city: Warren, Montana
- Coordinates: 45°0′20″N 108°30′14″W
- Area: 160 acres (65 ha)
- NRHP reference No.: 75001079
- Added to NRHP: November 20, 1975

Petroglyph Canyon (24CB601) is an archaeologically significant canyon in the northwestern United States. Located on both sides of the border between Montana and Wyoming, the canyon has long been obscure due to its small size. However, it gained substantial attention in the late 20th century because of its numerous prehistoric petroglyphs, and much of it was named a historic site in the 1970s.

== Geology ==
Petroglyph Canyon's most significant portion is located in the southern half of Section 35, Township 9 South, Range 26 East, within far southern Carbon County, Montana. The entire canyon runs in a northwest-southeast direction for approximately 4 miles (6.4 km), beginning 1 mile north of the most significant area and extending approximately 2.5 miles (4.0 km) into Big Horn County, Wyoming. The walls and boulders in the canyon are primarily sandstone, having been weathered to a dark brown color, although under the surface the stone is a lighter tan color.

== Petroglyphs ==
A portion of the canyon measuring approximately 800 feet (240 m) long features numerous prehistoric petroglyphs, both on the canyon walls and on boulders. At least eighteen different groups of carvings are known, in addition to features such as hearths and small pieces of stone resulting from the manufacturing process for stone tools. Most of the petroglyphs were created by "pecking" tiny holes, although one group is formed of lines that were clearly engraved into the rock. The majority of designs at Petroglyph Canyon feature humans or large game animals such as bison and bighorn sheep. Some carvings clearly feature men or women, many of which appear with sexual imagery such as phallic symbols or external female genitalia respectively. Some of the carvings are old enough that they have begun to weather to the dark color of the surrounding stone, but most show little sign of erosion. A few designs at the site, such as personal names, have obviously been added much more recently by vandals, but such carvings are rare and were typically placed near older designs instead of on top of them.

== Recognition ==
Petroglyph Canyon received its present name in 1967, when an archaeological survey discovered the carvings; it had appeared on numerous maps published since 1859, but no map published before 1967 provided a name for the canyon. The first "official" use of the current name was made in 1975, when the canyon was listed on the National Register of Historic Places; it appears on the National Register as "Petroglyph Canyon". Since that time, the name has commonly been used by agencies such as the Bureau of Land Management and the Forest Service, as well as by local residents. In 1992, the Board on Geographic Names officially gave the canyon its current name.

The canyon was listed on the National Register as an important archaeological site, as modern vandalism — whether carvings or occasional digging into the canyon's stone-tool manufacturing sites — had been unable to diminish its unparalleled quality. Petroglyph sites have been found throughout Montana, but "pecked" sites are far rarer than in states such as Wyoming or Utah, and Petroglyph Canyon features a broader range of artwork with less deterioration than almost any other Montana rock art site. When the site was listed, Bureau of Land Management archaeologists hoped to conduct future work at the site to compare it with other rock art sites in the region. Because the site's styles more closely resemble what has been found at distant sites than they do other nearby sites, it is hoped that such comparisons will reveal the migration patterns of the peoples who created sites such as Petroglyph Canyon.
