= Glidden House (Bridger, Montana) =

Historic house in Montana, United States

- U.S. National Register of Historic Places
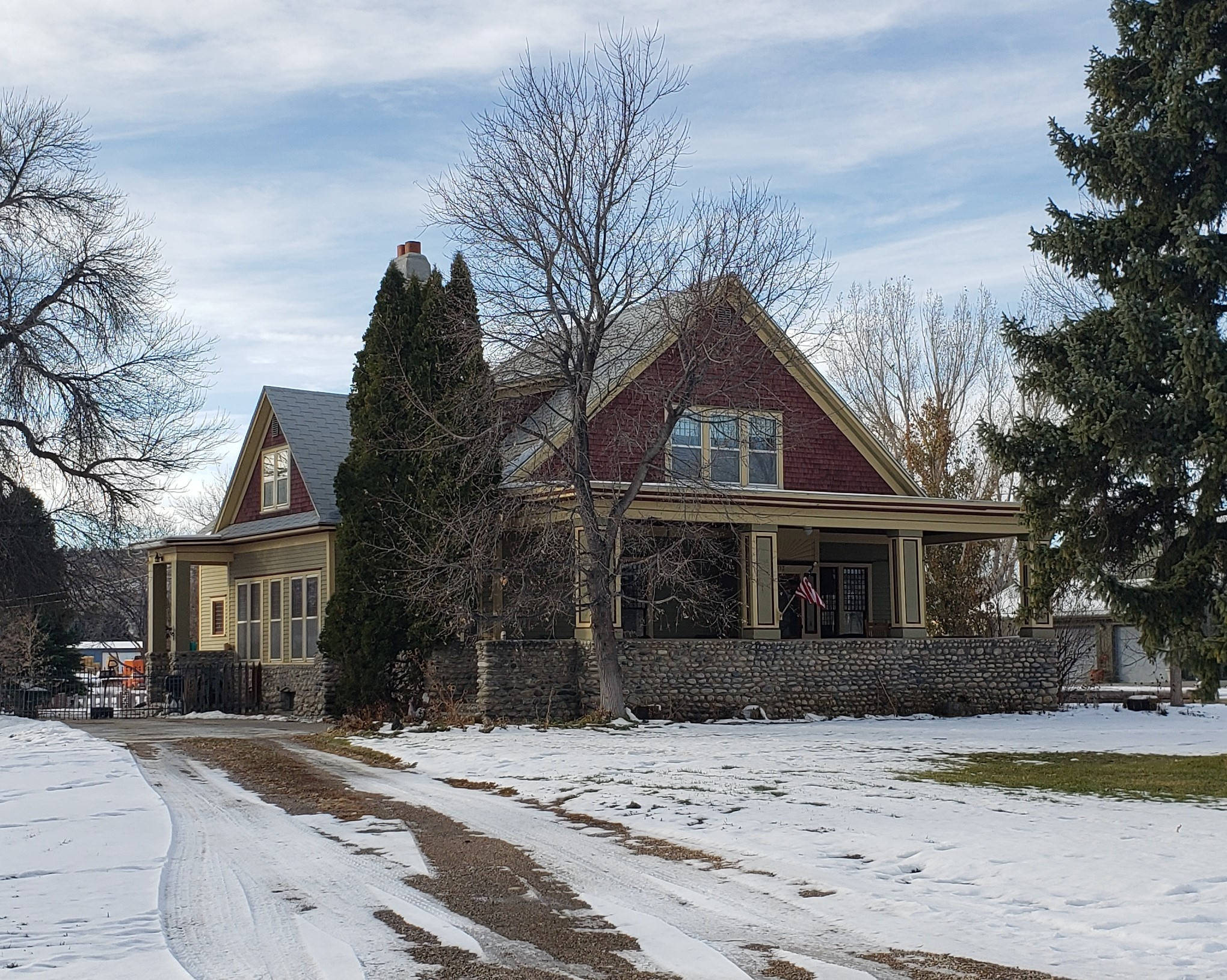

- Location within Montana Location within the United States
- Location: 112 N. E St., Bridger, Montana
- Coordinates: 45°17′47″N 108°54′22″W
- Area: less than one acre
- Built: 1906-07
- Architectural style: Late 19th and Early 20th Century American Movements, Arts and Crafts
- MPS: Bridger MRA
- NRHP reference No.: 87001236
- Added to NRHP: July 21, 1987

Glidden House, at 112 N. E St. in Bridger, Montana, was built during 1906–07. It was listed on the National Register of Historic Places in 1987.

It was deemed "a distinctive example of Arts and Crafts styling". It was built in 1907 for "Bridger's pre-eminent entrepreneur of the historic period, Samuel Glidden." It is adjacent to Arts and Crafts-style Corey House which is also National Register-listed.

It has also been known as Pillsbury House, for association with Minneapolis financier Alfred Pillsbury.

== See also ==
- Glidden Mercantile, also in Bridger and listed on the National Register
