= Gebo Barn =

- U.S. National Register of Historic Places
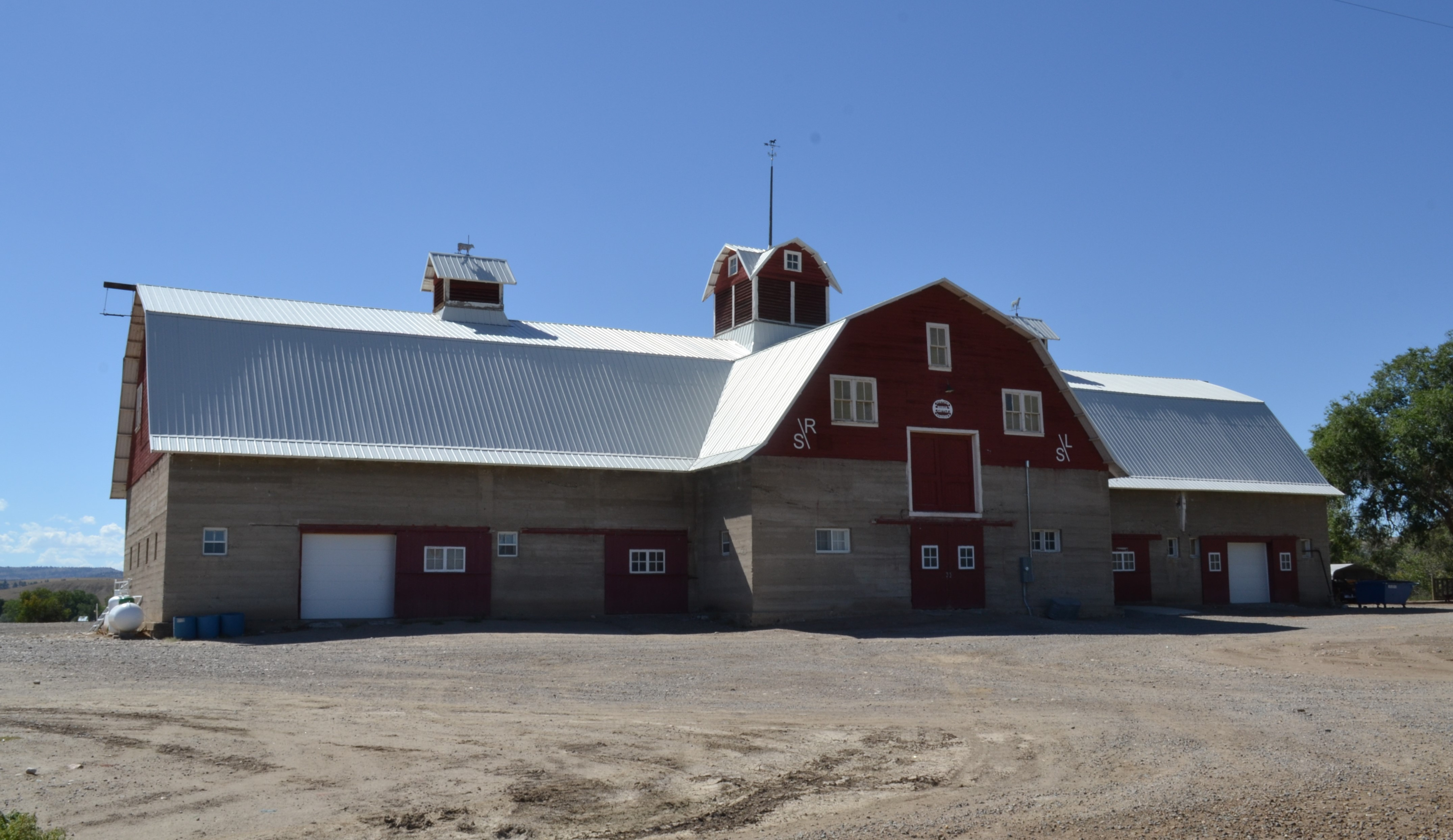

- Location within Montana
- Nearest city: Fromberg, Montana
- Coordinates: 45.354195°N 108.906087°W
- Area: 1.8 acres (0.73 ha)
- Built: 1907-09
- Architectural style: Concrete Gambrel-roofed
- MPS: Fromberg MPS
- NRHP reference No.: 05000512
- Added to NRHP: June 1, 2005

The Gebo Barn, in Carbon County, Montana near Fromberg, Montana, was built during 1907 to 1909. It was listed on the National Register of Historic Places in 2005.

It is a poured concrete gambrel-roofed barn built for Samuel W. (Sam) Gebo, a wealthy coal mine developer, on his ranch:

The barn was built on a grand scale to house his purebred Belgian horses, general livestock, and farm equipment. At the time, the ranch consisted of 335 acres and was valued at $45,170.2 It was the largest ranch in Carbon County at the time and was described by a reporter as "one of the finest farms in Montana, equipped from the woven wire fence right into the fireplace with all the modern implements and accessories." / Following his arrival in eastern Montana in the mid-1890s, Sam Gebo had made a fortune in coal mine developments in the Mountain West and had become one of the wealthier citizens in Carbon County. His Gebo Mine, near present day Fromberg, attracted the Northern Pacific Railroad to build a branch line into the Clarks Fork Valley in 1898, further opening the fertile area to mining and agricultural development. / Between 1903 and 1904, he bought 300-plus acres of ranch land just south of Fromberg.

It is not clear exactly when construction on Gebo's brick home and barn were completed, but in 1907 Gebo secured a $60,000 mortgage on the Fromberg land. Part of this money was likely used to build the large poured concrete barn. Though the architect and/or builder of the barn are unknown, it is likely that Gebo chose concrete as the primary building material for the barn given the ready availability of concrete from the newly opened Gibson Concrete Works in Fromberg. The barn was completed in 1909 and christened with a large party and dance in the cavernous loft. Reports say the lavish event included refreshments and a full orchestra, and that nearly 300 people from around the state attended the celebration despite bad weather and treacherous roads. Soon after, Gebo took out an advertisement for several consecutive weeks in the Bridger Times announcing that his Registered American Stud, "Monico," would be "standing" at the Fromberg ranch and other locations all summer. The stud fee was $20.

It is located 2.5 miles south of Fromberg on River Rd.
