= Bridger, Montana =

- Town
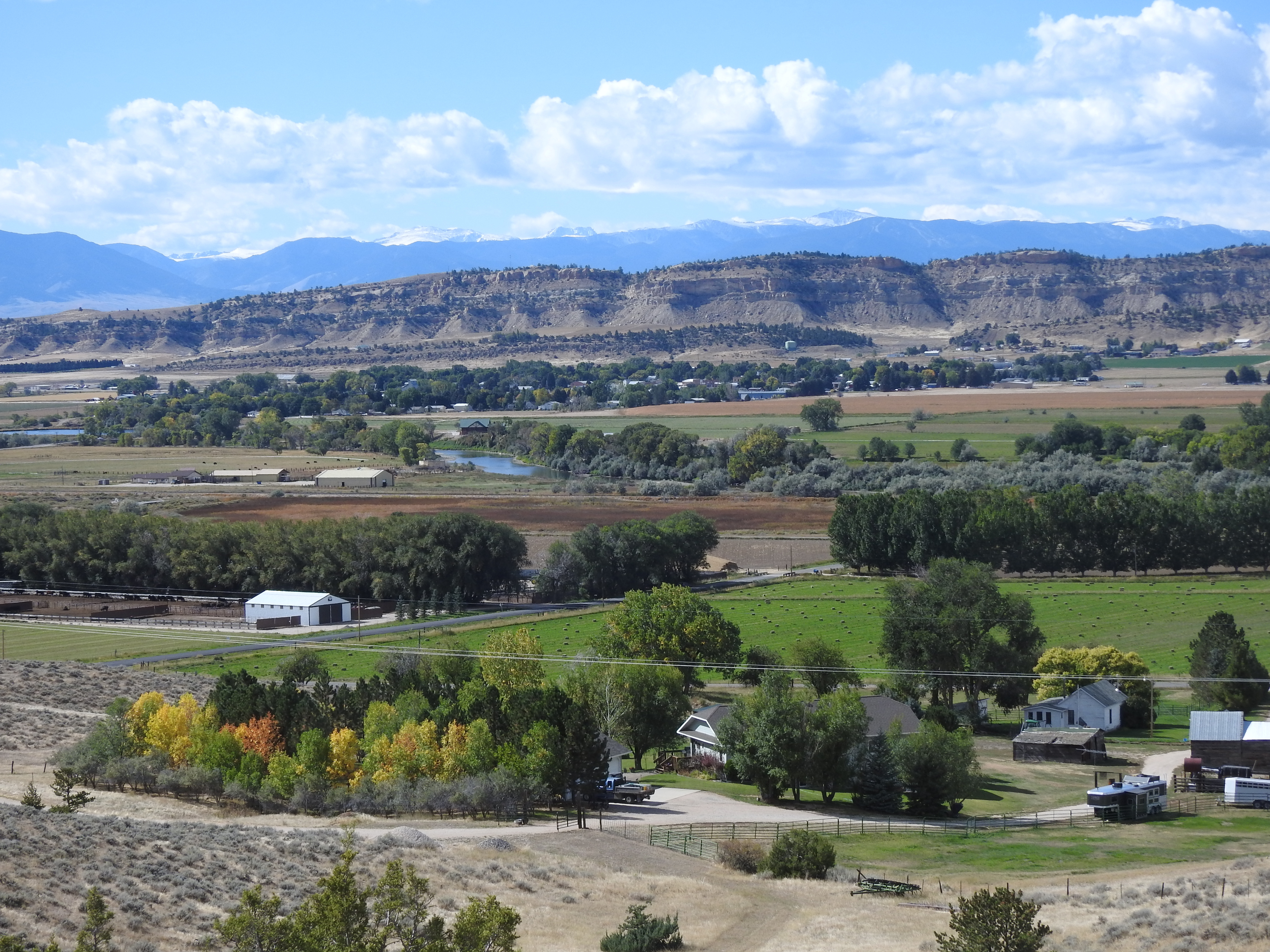

- Location of Bridger, Montana
- Coordinates: 45°17′41″N 108°55′00″W
- Country: United States
- State: Montana
- County: Carbon

Area
  - Total: 0.80 sq mi (2.06 km^{2})
  - Land: 0.80 sq mi (2.06 km^{2})
  - Water: 0 sq mi (0.00 km^{2})
- Elevation: 3,685 ft (1,123 m)

Population (2020)
  - Total: 662
  - Density: 830.4/sq mi (320.63/km^{2})
- Time zone: UTC-7 (Mountain (MST))
  - Summer (DST): UTC-6 (MDT)
- ZIP code: 59014
- Area code: 406
- FIPS code: 30-09475
- GNIS feature ID: 2411726
- Website: www.bridger-mt.com

Bridger is a town in Carbon County, Montana, United States. It is part of the Billings, Montana Metropolitan Statistical Area. The population was 662 at the 2020 census.

The town of Bridger was named for the scout Jim Bridger. Residents originally wanted to name the town after George Town, one of the original settlers, but Town encouraged residents to name the newly founded town after his old friend Jim Bridger. The Bridger Trail passes to the southeast of the town of Bridger.

== History ==
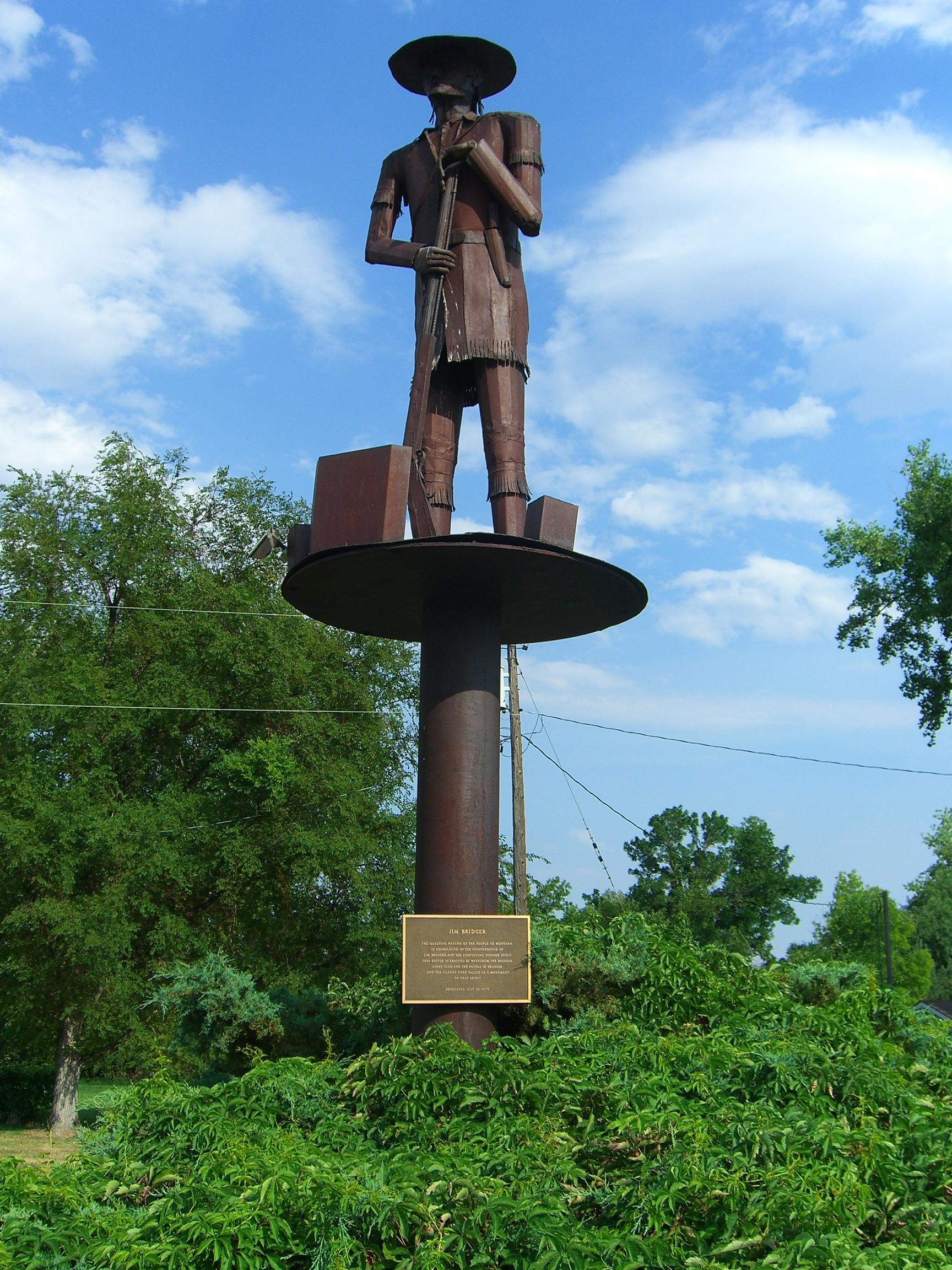
Jim Bridger monument in Bridger, Montana

The Bridger Post Office was officially established on October 29, 1898, with Jno. M. Babcock as the town's first postmaster.

In December 2014, construction began on a large wind farm, Mud Springs Wind Ranch, with 120 wind turbines, at a site 12 miles southeast of Bridger. The project was renamed Pryor Mountain Wind Project and was completed in late 2020.

== Geography ==
Bridger is located on U.S. Highway 310 which runs through the town. The Clarks Fork of the Yellowstone River flows past the east side of the community and the Chicago, Burlington and Quincy Railroad passes just east of the river.

According to the United States Census Bureau, the town has a total area of 0.80 square miles (2.07 km^{2}), all land.

=== Climate ===
According to the Köppen Climate Classification system, Bridger has a semi-arid climate, abbreviated "BSk" on climate maps.

Climate data for Bridger, Montana, 1991–2020 normals, extremes 1900–present
| Month | Jan | Feb | Mar | Apr | May | Jun | Jul | Aug | Sep | Oct | Nov | Dec | Year |
|---|---|---|---|---|---|---|---|---|---|---|---|---|---|
| Record high °F (°C) | 73 (23) | 71 (22) | 85 (29) | 89 (32) | 98 (37) | 106 (41) | 112 (44) | 107 (42) | 105 (41) | 92 (33) | 78 (26) | 72 (22) | 112 (44) |
| Mean maximum °F (°C) | 54.0 (12.2) | 56.1 (13.4) | 69.9 (21.1) | 80.4 (26.9) | 87.2 (30.7) | 94.4 (34.7) | 100.2 (37.9) | 98.5 (36.9) | 93.7 (34.3) | 81.8 (27.7) | 67.0 (19.4) | 55.5 (13.1) | 100.9 (38.3) |
| Mean daily maximum °F (°C) | 35.4 (1.9) | 38.9 (3.8) | 50.4 (10.2) | 57.7 (14.3) | 67.4 (19.7) | 77.3 (25.2) | 87.2 (30.7) | 86.3 (30.2) | 75.3 (24.1) | 59.7 (15.4) | 45.8 (7.7) | 35.9 (2.2) | 59.8 (15.4) |
| Daily mean °F (°C) | 24.2 (−4.3) | 27.0 (−2.8) | 36.4 (2.4) | 43.8 (6.6) | 53.5 (11.9) | 62.1 (16.7) | 70.2 (21.2) | 68.3 (20.2) | 58.4 (14.7) | 45.7 (7.6) | 34.0 (1.1) | 25.1 (−3.8) | 45.7 (7.6) |
| Mean daily minimum °F (°C) | 12.9 (−10.6) | 15.1 (−9.4) | 22.4 (−5.3) | 29.9 (−1.2) | 39.6 (4.2) | 47.0 (8.3) | 53.1 (11.7) | 50.2 (10.1) | 41.5 (5.3) | 31.7 (−0.2) | 22.2 (−5.4) | 14.2 (−9.9) | 31.6 (−0.2) |
| Mean minimum °F (°C) | −9.0 (−22.8) | −3.3 (−19.6) | 4.9 (−15.1) | 16.6 (−8.6) | 27.7 (−2.4) | 36.4 (2.4) | 44.4 (6.9) | 40.3 (4.6) | 31.3 (−0.4) | 16.7 (−8.5) | 2.0 (−16.7) | −6.6 (−21.4) | −15.6 (−26.4) |
| Record low °F (°C) | −34 (−37) | −35 (−37) | −26 (−32) | −4 (−20) | 16 (−9) | 27 (−3) | 35 (2) | 28 (−2) | 9 (−13) | −13 (−25) | −26 (−32) | −37 (−38) | −37 (−38) |
| Average precipitation inches (mm) | 0.29 (7.4) | 0.33 (8.4) | 0.47 (12) | 1.57 (40) | 2.25 (57) | 1.80 (46) | 0.83 (21) | 0.61 (15) | 1.15 (29) | 1.23 (31) | 0.6 (15) | 0.37 (9.4) | 11.5 (291.2) |
| Average snowfall inches (cm) | 5.1 (13) | 4.5 (11) | 3.1 (7.9) | 3.5 (8.9) | 0.7 (1.8) | 0.0 (0.0) | 0.0 (0.0) | 0.0 (0.0) | 0.0 (0.0) | 2.0 (5.1) | 4.7 (12) | 6.7 (17) | 30.3 (76.7) |
| Average precipitation days (≥ 0.01 in) | 1.9 | 2.3 | 3.2 | 6.3 | 8.4 | 8.2 | 4.3 | 4.5 | 4.6 | 5.0 | 2.8 | 2.8 | 54.3 |
| Average snowy days (≥ 0.1 in) | 2.2 | 2.4 | 1.4 | 1.3 | 0.2 | 0.0 | 0.0 | 0.0 | 0.0 | 0.8 | 1.9 | 2.7 | 12.9 |
Source 1: NOAA
Source 2: National Weather Service

== Demographics ==
Historical population
| Census | Pop. | Note | %± |
|---|---|---|---|
| 1910 | 514 | | — |
| 1920 | 679 | | 32.1% |
| 1930 | 567 | | −16.5% |
| 1940 | 783 | | 38.1% |
| 1950 | 854 | | 9.1% |
| 1960 | 824 | | −3.5% |
| 1970 | 717 | | −13.0% |
| 1980 | 724 | | 1.0% |
| 1990 | 692 | | −4.4% |
| 2000 | 745 | | 7.7% |
| 2010 | 708 | | −5.0% |
| 2020 | 662 | | −6.5% |
U.S. Decennial Census

=== 2010 census ===
As of the census of 2010, there were 708 people, 315 households, and 195 families living in the town. The population density was 885.0 inhabitants per square mile (341.7/km^{2}). There were 347 housing units at an average density of 433.8 per square mile (167.5/km^{2}). The racial makeup of the town was 95.5% White, 0.1% African American, 2.7% Native American, 0.3% Asian, 0.3% from other races, and 1.1% from two or more races. Hispanic or Latino of any race were 1.8% of the population.

There were 315 households, of which 24.8% had children under the age of 18 living with them, 46.3% were married couples living together, 9.5% had a female householder with no husband present, 6.0% had a male householder with no wife present, and 38.1% were non-families. 31.1% of all households were made up of individuals, and 14.6% had someone living alone who was 65 years of age or older. The average household size was 2.25 and the average family size was 2.84.

The median age in the town was 45.7 years. 22.2% of residents were under the age of 18; 5.4% were between the ages of 18 and 24; 21.6% were from 25 to 44; 29.9% were from 45 to 64; and 20.8% were 65 years of age or older. The gender makeup of the town was 48.2% male and 51.8% female.

=== 2000 census ===
As of the census of 2000, there were 745 people, 313 households, and 200 families living in the town. The population density was 1,175.2 inhabitants per square mile (453.7/km^{2}). There were 345 housing units at an average density of 544.2 per square mile (210.1/km^{2}). The racial makeup of the town was 98.12% White, 0.40% Native American, 0.13% from other races, and 1.34% from two or more races. Hispanic or Latino of any race were 3.62% of the population.

There were 313 households, out of which 28.4% had children under the age of 18 living with them, 49.2% were married couples living together, 9.9% had a female householder with no husband present, and 36.1% were non-families. 31.9% of all households were made up of individuals, and 15.0% had someone living alone who was 65 years of age or older. The average household size was 2.36 and the average family size was 2.94.

In the town, the population was spread out, with 27.5% under the age of 18, 7.9% from 18 to 24, 24.0% from 25 to 44, 23.2% from 45 to 64, and 17.3% who were 65 years of age or older. The median age was 40 years. For every 100 females, there were 97.6 males. For every 100 females age 18 and over, there were 92.2 males.

The median income for a household in the town was $26,103, and the median income for a family was $32,981. Males had a median income of $24,063 versus $18,929 for females. The per capita income for the town was $17,060. About 10.7% of families and 16.2% of the population were below the poverty line, including 21.8% of those under age 18 and 10.4% of those age 65 or over.

== Government ==
Bridger has a mayor and four city councilors. Clifford Shultz was elected mayor in November 2025. He replaced Mark DeRudder who did not run for re-election.

== Education ==
Bridger Public Schools provides education from kindergarten through 12th grade. They are known as the Scouts. Bridger High School is a Class C school.

Bridger Public Library serves the town.

== Infrastructure ==
Bridger Municipal Airport 6S1 a small towerless general aviation airport that serves the Bridger area. The nearest commercial airport is Billings Logan International Airport.

== Notable person ==
- David Thatcher, a Staff Sergeant in the United States Air Force and the last survivor of the crew of the "Ruptured Duck" during the Doolittle Raid, was born in Bridger.
