= Fromberg, Montana =

Town in Carbon County, Montana, United States

- Town
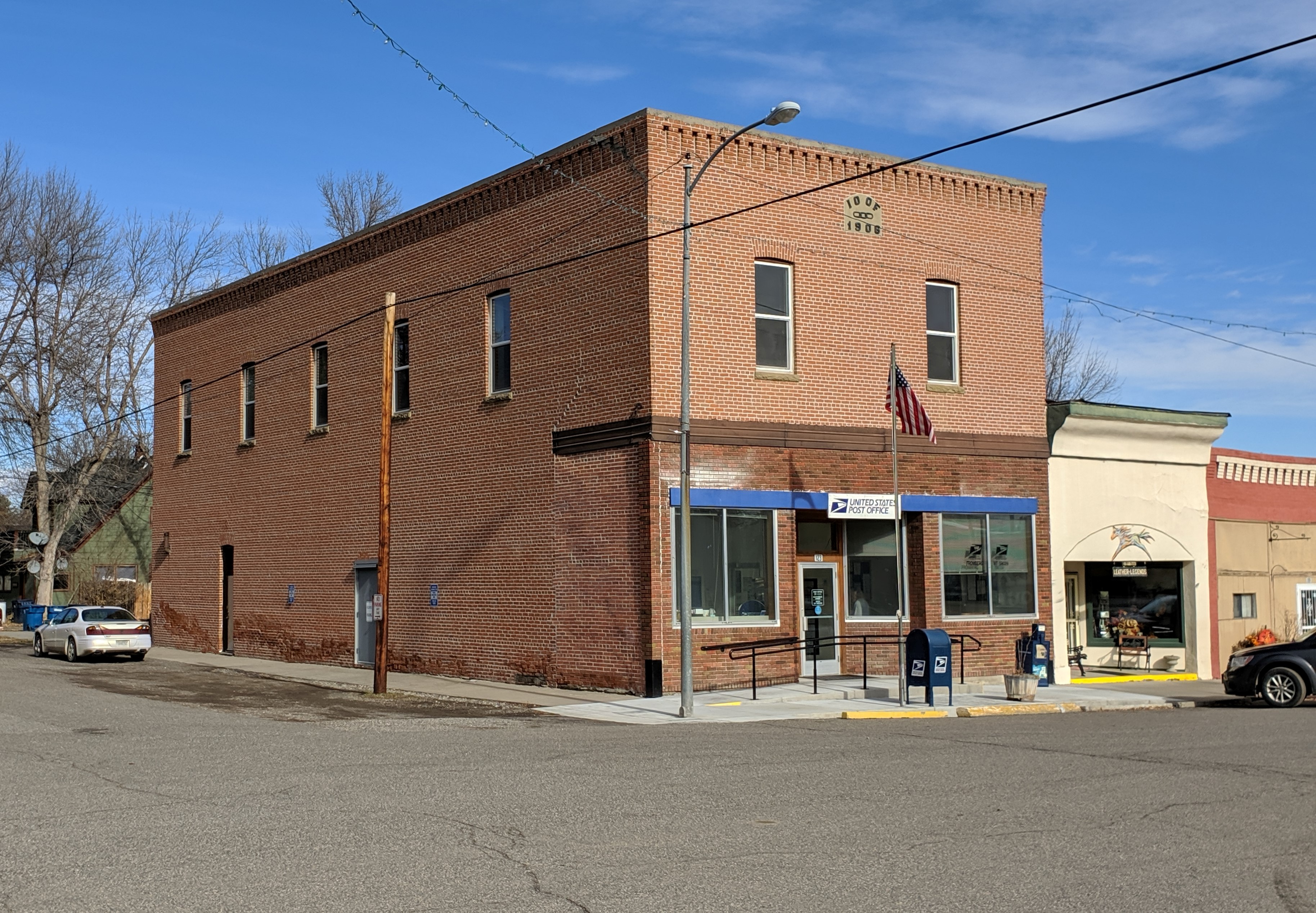
- Post office in 2019

- Location within Carbon County and Montana
- Coordinates: 45°23′31″N 108°54′23″W
- Country: United States
- State: Montana
- County: Carbon

Area
  - Total: 0.45 sq mi (1.16 km^{2})
  - Land: 0.44 sq mi (1.15 km^{2})
  - Water: 0.0039 sq mi (0.01 km^{2})
- Elevation: 3,534 ft (1,077 m)

Population (2020)
  - Total: 392
  - Density: 883.7/sq mi (341.21/km^{2})
- Time zone: UTC-7 (Mountain (MST))
  - Summer (DST): UTC-6 (MDT)
- ZIP code: 59029
- Area code: 406
- FIPS code: 30-29575
- GNIS ID: 2412663
- Website: fromberg-mt.com

Fromberg is a town in Carbon County, Montana, United States. As of the 2020 census, the population of the town was 392.

== History ==
The community is near the Gebo Mine, developed by Samuel Gebo, a coal mine nearby. Coalville, Montana, also known as Gebo, was the community closer to the coal mine itself.

The Fromberg Post Office was established on March 21, 1903, with Abraham Pierson as the town's first postmaster. The town was named after Northern Pacific stockholder Conrad Fromberg.

The Gebo Barn, 2.5 miles to the south on Gebo Ranch, was completed in 1909 and is listed on the National Register of Historic Places.

Fromberg was heavily affected by the 2022 Montana floods.

== Geography ==
Montana Secondary Highway 310 and the Chicago, Burlington and Quincy Railroad run through town. The Clarks Fork Yellowstone River flows past the east side of the community.

According to the United States Census Bureau, the town has a total area of 0.48 square miles (1.24 km^{2}), all land.

=== Climate ===
The Köppen Climate Classification subtype for this climate is "BSk" (Tropical and Subtropical Steppe Climate).

Climate data for Fromberg, Montana
Month	Jan	Feb	Mar	Apr	May	Jun	Jul	Aug	Sep	Oct	Nov	Dec	Year
Mean daily maximum °C (°F)	1 (34)	4 (40)	9 (49)	16 (60)	21 (70)	26 (79)	31 (88)	31 (87)	24 (75)	17 (63)	8 (47)	3 (37)	16 (61)
Mean daily minimum °C (°F)	−11 (12)	−9 (16)	−5 (23)	0 (32)	4 (40)	9 (48)	12 (53)	11 (51)	6 (42)	1 (33)	−5 (23)	−9 (15)	0 (32)
Average precipitation mm (inches)	13 (0.5)	10 (0.4)	18 (0.7)	36 (1.4)	48 (1.9)	46 (1.8)	20 (0.8)	18 (0.7)	33 (1.3)	28 (1.1)	15 (0.6)	10 (0.4)	290 (11.5)
Source: Weatherbase

== Demographics ==
Historical population
Census	Pop.	Note	%±
1920	520		—
1930	446		−14.2%
1940	533		19.5%
1950	442		−17.1%
1960	367		−17.0%
1970	364		−0.8%
1980	469		28.8%
1990	370		−21.1%
2000	486		31.4%
2010	438		−9.9%
2020	392		−10.5%
U.S. Decennial Census

Fromberg is part of the Billings, Montana Metropolitan Statistical Area.

=== 2010 census ===
As of the census of 2010, there were 438 people, 189 households, and 128 families living in the town. The population density was 912.5 inhabitants per square mile (352.3/km^{2}). There were 211 housing units at an average density of 439.6 per square mile (169.7/km^{2}). The racial makeup of the town was 97.3% White, 0.7% Native American, 1.6% from other races, and 0.5% from two or more races. Hispanic or Latino of any race were 5.3% of the population.

There were 189 households, of which 25.9% had children under the age of 18 living with them, 54.0% were married couples living together, 7.9% had a female householder with no husband present, 5.8% had a male householder with no wife present, and 32.3% were non-families. 27.0% of all households were made up of individuals, and 10.6% had someone living alone who was 65 years of age or older. The average household size was 2.32 and the average family size was 2.80.

The median age in the town was 47.7 years. 21.2% of residents were under the age of 18; 4.9% were between the ages of 18 and 24; 19.2% were from 25 to 44; 33.5% were from 45 to 64; and 21% were 65 years of age or older. The gender makeup of the town was 52.1% male and 47.9% female.

=== 2000 census ===
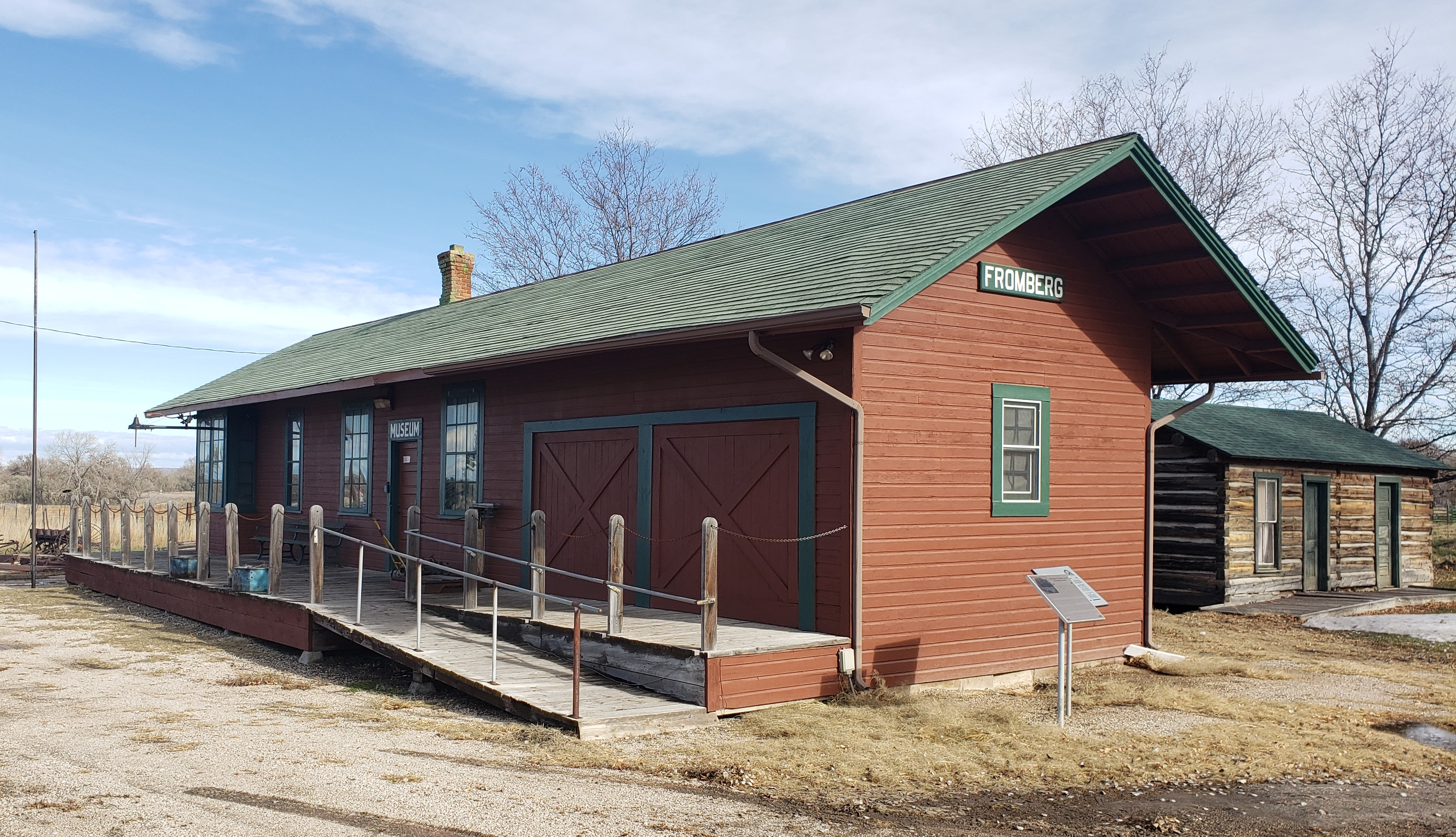
Historical Northern Pacific Railroad Depot (2019)

As of the census of 2000, there were 486 people, 198 households, and 129 families living in the town. The population density was 1,007.7 inhabitants per square mile (389.1/km^{2}). There were 220 housing units at an average density of 456.1 per square mile (176.1/km^{2}). The racial makeup of the town was 92.18% White, 0.41% Native American, 0.21% Asian, 6.79% from other races, and 0.41% from two or more races. Hispanic or Latino people of any race were 7.41% of the population.

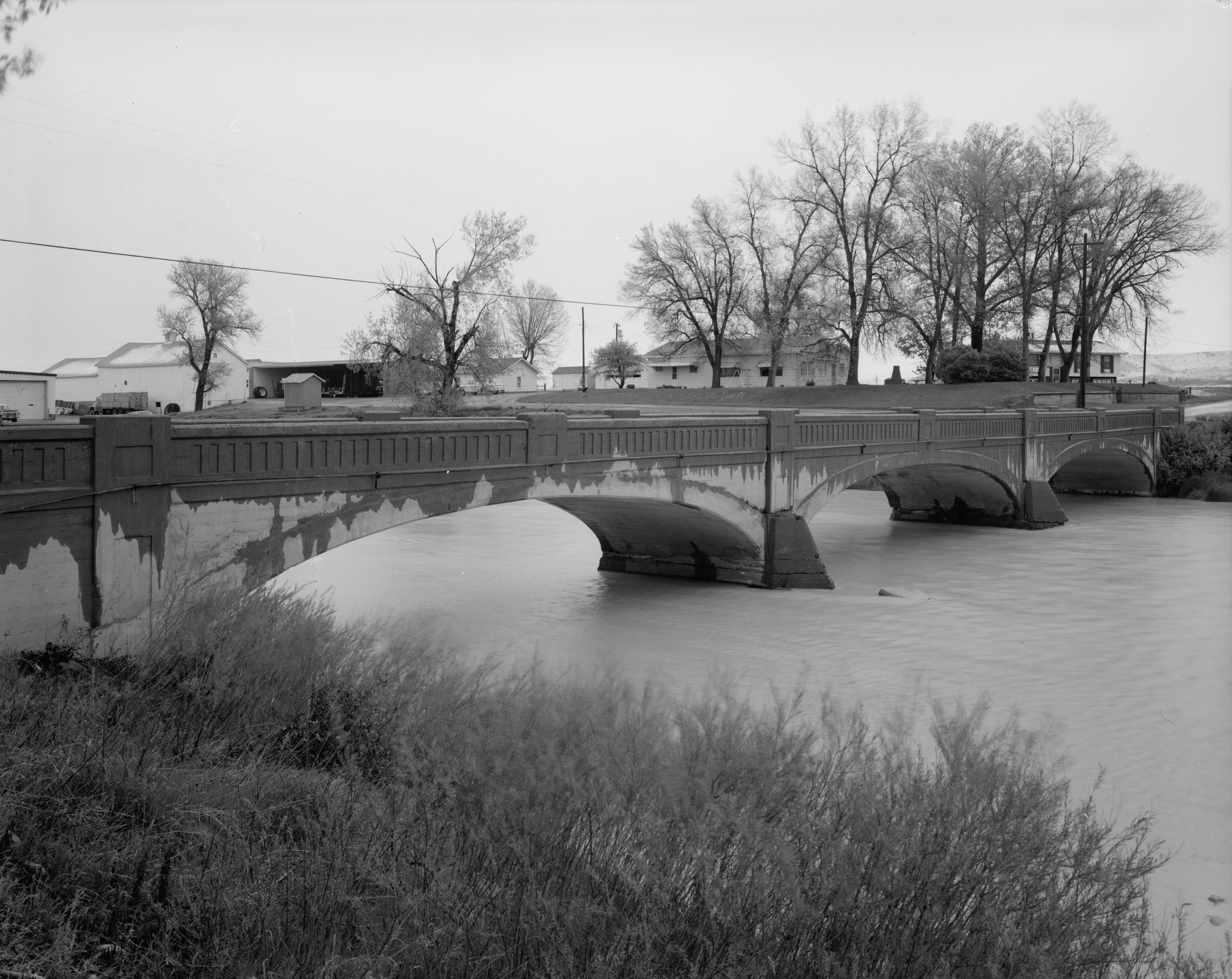
Fromberg Concrete Arch Bridge

There were 198 households, out of which 31.8% had children under the age of 18 living with them, 47.0% were married couples living together, 14.1% had a female householder with no husband present, and 34.8% were non-families. 30.3% of all households were made up of individuals, and 17.2% had someone living alone who was 65 years of age or older. The average household size was 2.45 and the average family size was 3.05.

In the town, the population was spread out, with 30.2% under the age of 18, 6.2% from 18 to 24, 26.1% from 25 to 44, 22.8% from 45 to 64, and 14.6% who were 65 years of age or older. The median age was 38 years. For every 100 females, there were 93.6 males. For every 100 females age 18 and over, there were 93.7 males.

The median income for a household in the town was $29,219, and the median income for a family was $32,750. Males had a median income of $24,063 versus $17,344 for females. The per capita income for the town was $14,667. About 6.2% of families and 10.0% of the population were below the poverty line, including 15.6% of those under age 18 and 7.4% of those age 65 or over.

== Education ==
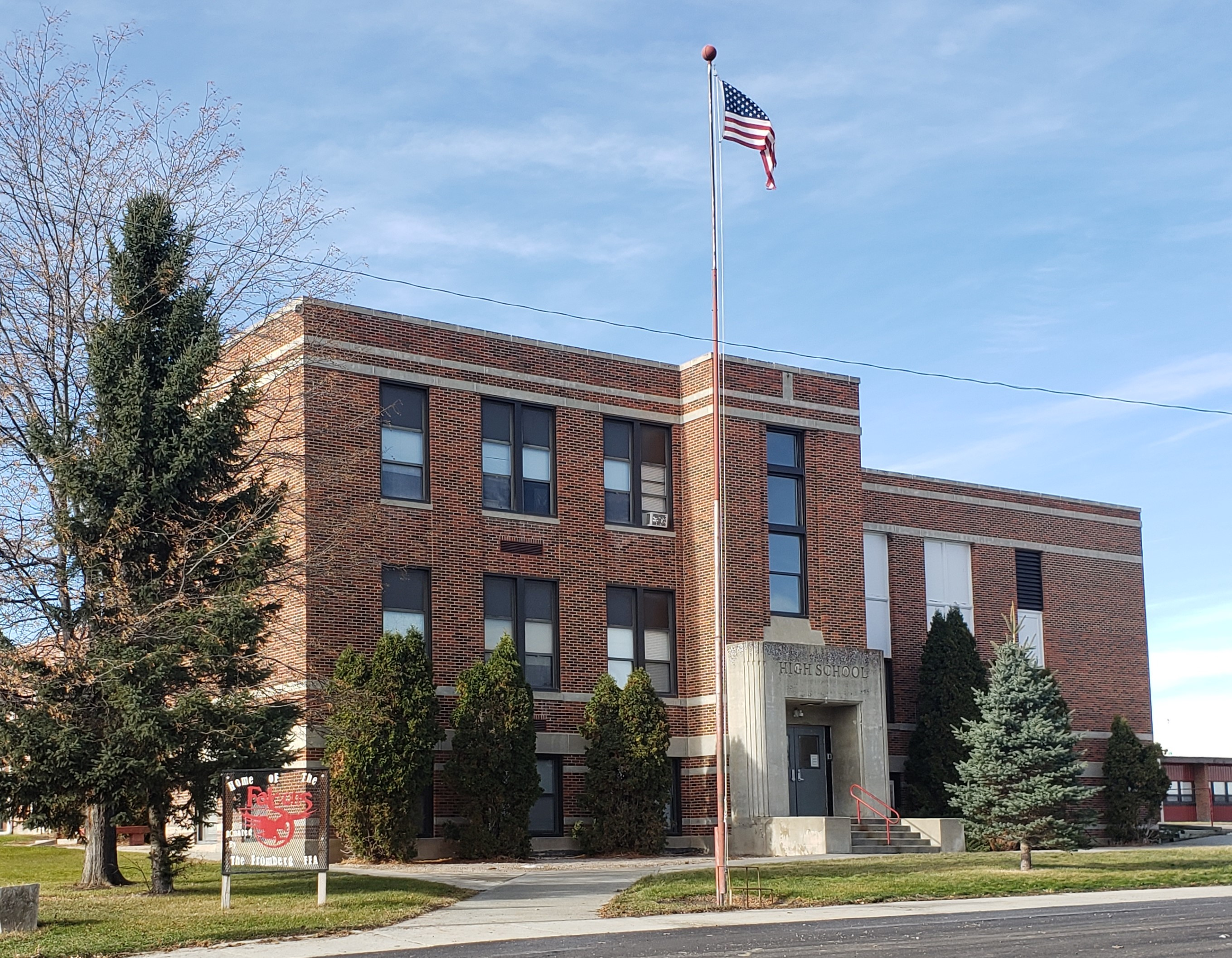
The old Fromburg High School

Fromberg educates students from kindergarten through 12th grade. They are known as the Falcons. Fromberg High School is a Class C school.

== Notable people ==
- Arthur A. Ageton, United States ambassador; born in Fromberg
- Jenna Jameson, "the queen of porn"; lived at a cattle ranch here for some time
