= Pilot Peak (Wyoming) =

Mountain in Wyoming, United States

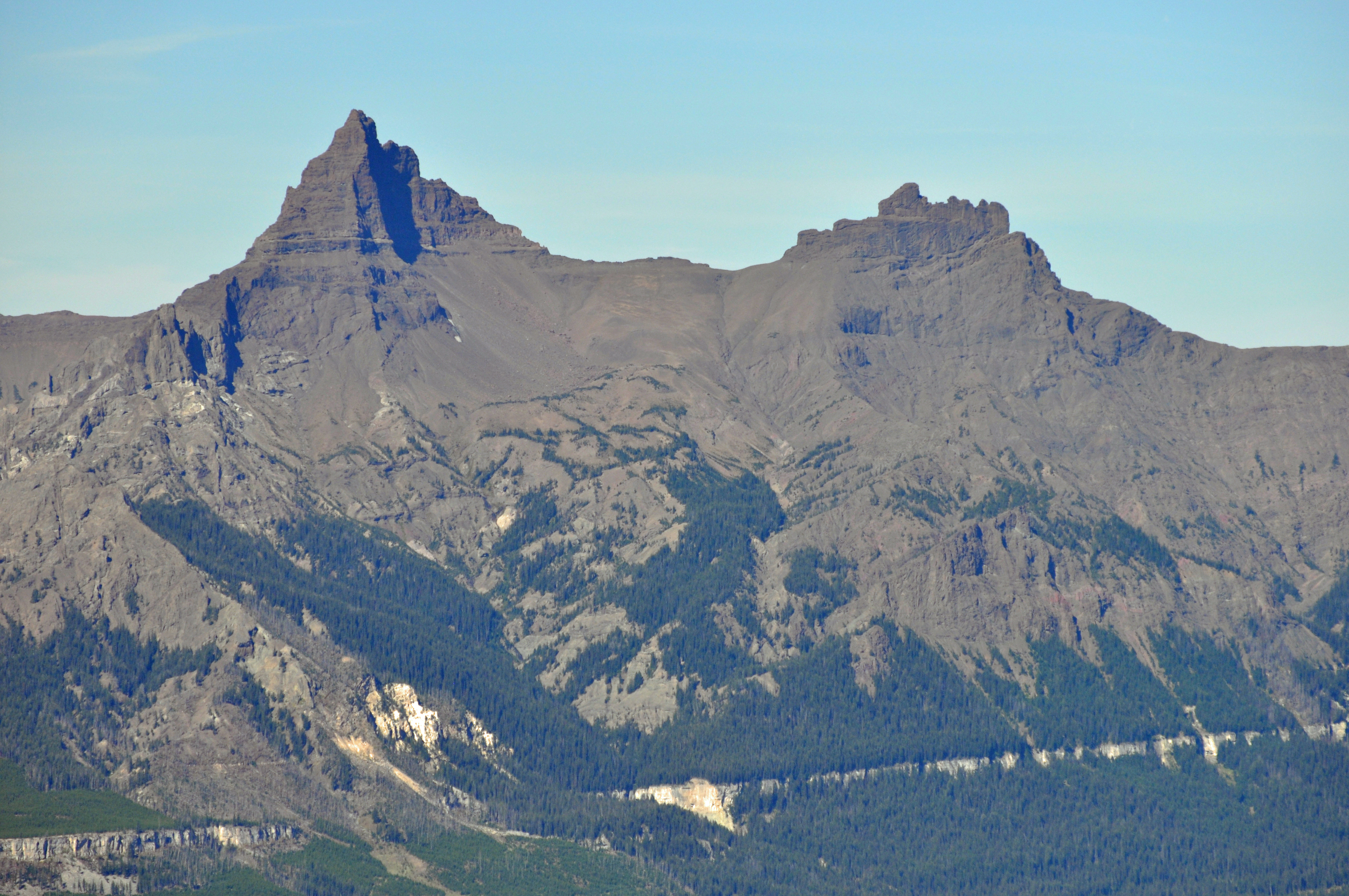
- Pilot Peak (left)

Highest point
- Elevation: 11,699 ft (3,566 m)
- Prominence: 2,499 ft (762 m)
- Isolation: 10.69 mi (17.20 km)
- Coordinates: 44°58′36″N 109°52′56″W

Geography
- Location within Wyoming Location within the United States
- Location: North Absaroka Wilderness; Park County, Wyoming
- Parent range: Absaroka Range
- Topo map: USGS Pilot Peak

Climbing
- First ascent: August 12, 1932
- Easiest route: class 5.6 climbing

Pilot Peak, elevation 11,699 feet (3,566 m), is a prominent mountain peak in the Absaroka Range in Park County, Wyoming. The peak is visible from US Route 212, the Beartooth Highway just east of the Northeast Entrance Station to Yellowstone National Park. Index Peak rises just north of Pilot Peak.

Pilot Peak is composed of crumbly rock and rarely climbed. Its first documented ascent was in 1932 by Robert McKenzie and Hollis Mees.

Pilot Peak's name first appeared on an 1873 map, and was officially adopted in 1937 by the United States Board on Geographic Names.

== Climate ==
According to the Köppen climate classification system, Pilot Peak is located in a subarctic climate zone with long, cold, snowy winters, and cool to warm summers. Temperatures can drop below −10 °F with wind chill factors below −30 °F. Precipitation runoff from the mountain drains into tributaries of the Clarks Fork Yellowstone River.

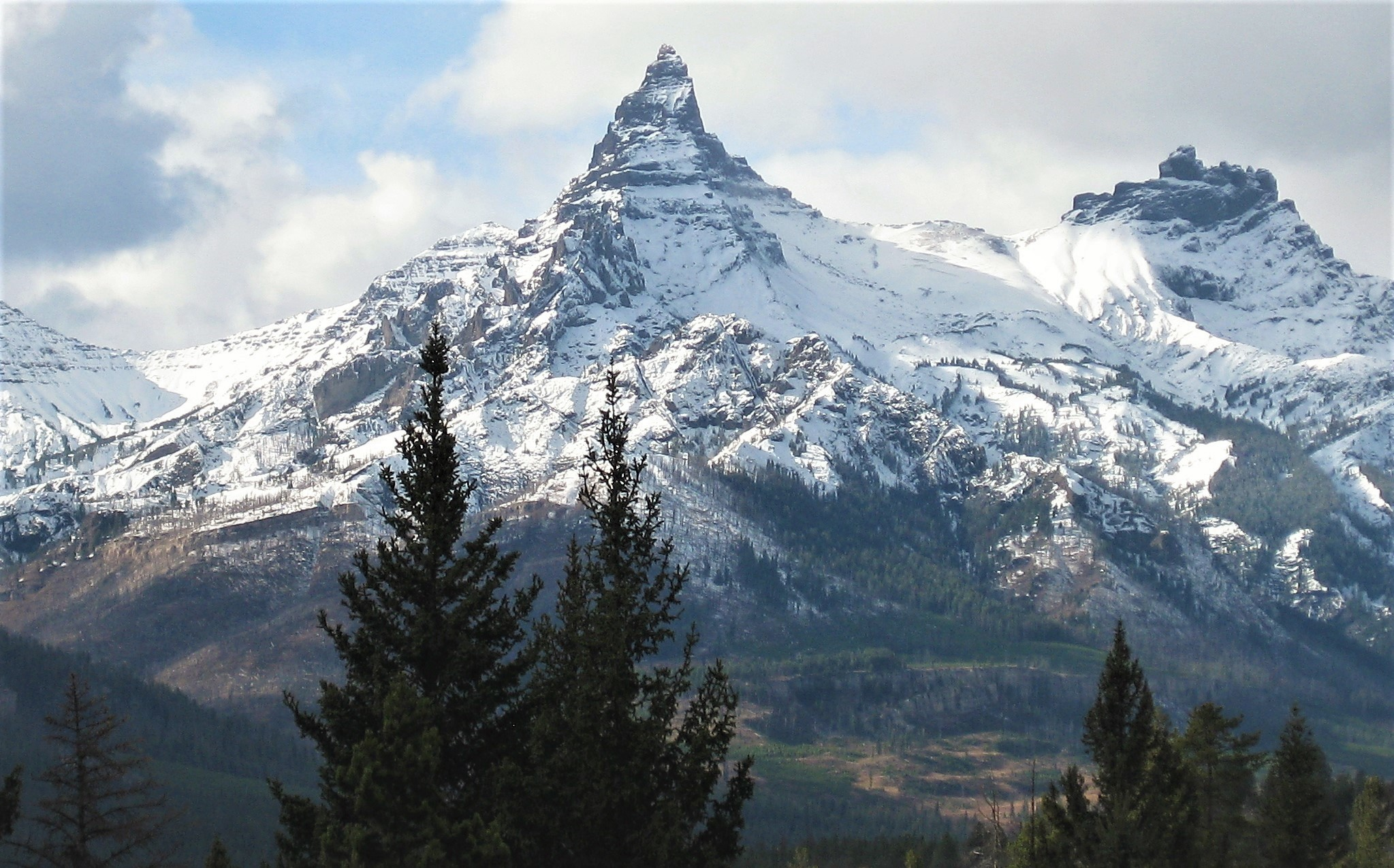
Pilot Peak, east aspect

== See also ==
- List of mountain peaks of Wyoming
