= U.S. Route 212 in Montana and Wyoming =

Highway in Montana and Wyoming

U.S. Route 212
- Beartooth Highway; Warrior Trail Highway
- US 212 highlighted in red (Montana) and blue (Wyoming)

Route information
- Maintained by MDT and WYDOT
- Length: 376.446 mi (605.831 km) 321.232 miles (516.973 km) in Montana; 55.214 miles (88.858 km) in Wyoming (two segments)

Major junctions
- West end: Northeastern entrance of Yellowstone National Park
- US 310 from Rockvale, MT to Laurel, MT; I-90 from Laurel, MT to Crow Agency, MT; US 87 from Billings, MT to Crow Agency, MT; I-94 in Billings, MT
- East end: US 212 at the South Dakota state line

Location
- Country: United States
- States: Montana, Wyoming
- Counties: MT: Park, Carbon, Big Horn, Rosebud, Powder River, Carter; WY: Park, Crook

Highway system
- United States Numbered Highway System; List; Special; Divided
- Montana Highway System; Interstate; US; State; Secondary
- Wyoming State Highway System; Interstate; US; State
← MT 200S	MT	→ US 287
← WYO 211	WY	→ WYO 212

U.S. Route 212 (US 212) is a part of the U.S. Highway System that travels from Yellowstone National Park east to Edina, Minnesota. In Montana and Wyoming, it starts at the northeastern entrance of Yellowstone National Park near Silver Gate, Montana and extends approximately 376 miles (605 km) to the South Dakota state near Colony, Wyoming, with it crossing between the two states numerous times.

== Route description ==
The official western terminus of US 212 is at the Northeast Entrance of Yellowstone National Park near the Wyoming–Montana state line; however, some commercially produced maps show the highway within the park itself, contiguous with Northeast Entrance Road, starting from its western end at Tower Junction on the Grand Loop. From the park, US 212 begins as the Beartooth Highway, tracing the historical route of Civil War General Philip Sheridan over the Beartooth Mountains. In his book Dateline America published in 1979, the late CBS correspondent Charles Kuralt referred to the highway as "the most beautiful drive in America". The highway travels through an eight-mile (13 km) segment in Montana, past Cooke City, to the Wyoming state line, where it passes through the state for approximately 35 miles (56 km) and crossing Beartooth Pass at an elevation of 10,974 feet (3,345 m) above sea level. US 212 crosses back into Montana and travels approximately 25 miles (40 km) to Red Lodge, which is the eastern terminus of the Beartooth Highway.

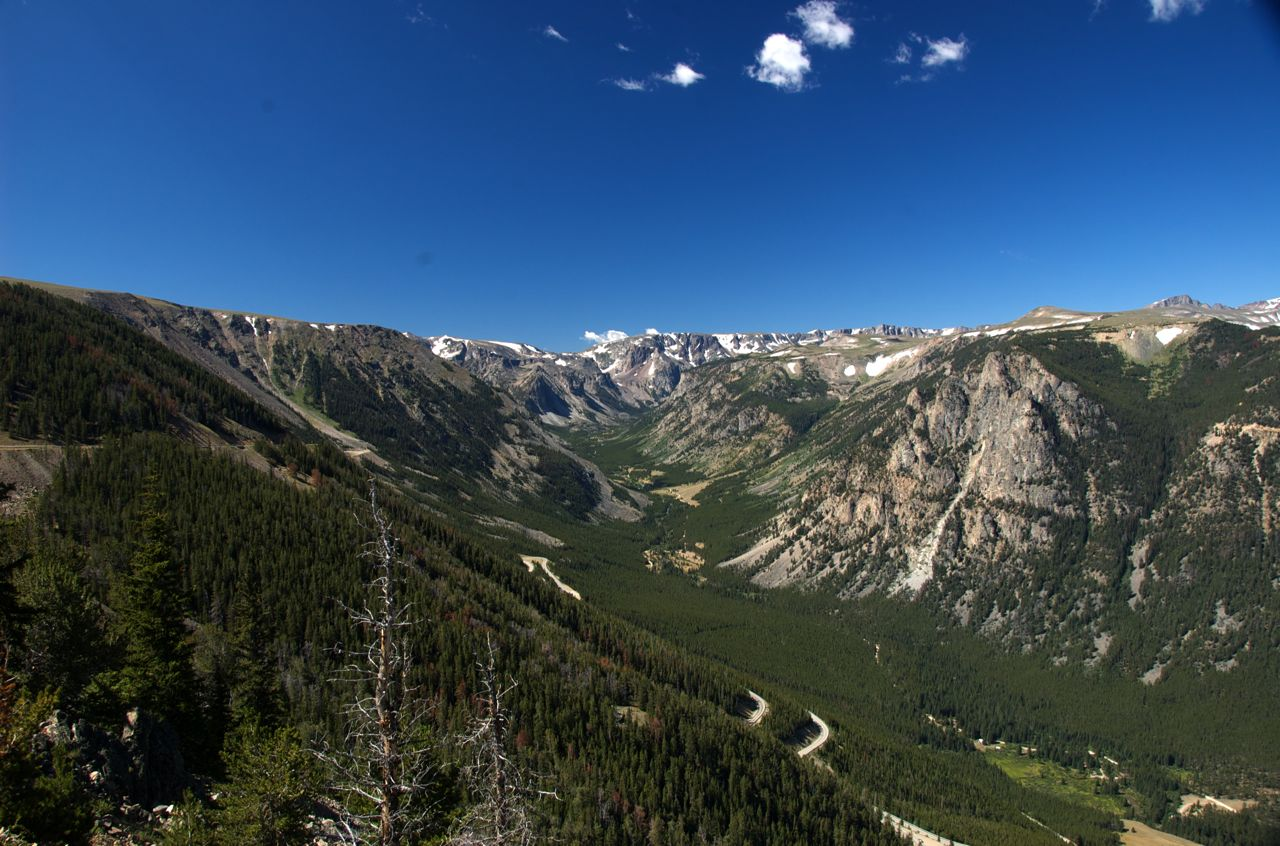
US 212 looking west from Vista Point towards the Beartooth Mountains. Along this series of switchbacks, US 212 climbs over 3,000 feet (910 m) to Beartooth Pass.

US 212 continues northeast from the Beartooth Mountains for 31 miles (50 km) to Rockvale, where it joins US 310 and the two routes share a 13-mile (21 km) concurrency to Laurel. Here US 212 joins Interstate 90 (I-90), while US 310 ends, and they travel nine miles (14 km) east to Billings. On the east side of Billings, US 87 joins I-90 and US 212 and the three routes continue 58 miles (93 km) east to Crow Agency, located within the Crow Indian Reservation.

US 212 leaves I-90 and US 87, becoming the 164-mile (264 km) Warrior Trail Highway, and heads east and southeast through the high plains of Montana. It passes the Little Bighorn Battlefield National Monument, through the Northern Cheyenne Indian Reservation, to the Wyoming state line southeast to Alzada. US 212 travels for 20.5 miles (33.0 km) through the isolated northeastern extremity of Wyoming before crossing into South Dakota, approximately 13 miles (21 km) northwest of Belle Fourche, South Dakota.

== Major intersections ==
State	County	Location	mi	km	Destinations	Notes
Montana	Park	Yellowstone National Park	0.000	0.000	Northeast Entrance Road	Continuation into Yellowstone National Park; US 212 / Beartooth Highway western terminus
Montana	Park	Yellowstone National Park	0.000	0.000	Yellowstone National Park boundary (Northeast Entrance); fees required	
Montana	Park	Silver Gate	0.658	1.059		
Montana	Park	Cooke City	3.930	6.325	Winter closure gate	
Montana	Park	Cooke City	Beartooth Highway (US 212) closed mid-October – Memorial Day weekend			
Montana	Park		5.600	9.012	Colter Pass – elevation 8,048 ft (2,453 m)	
Montana–Wyoming state line			8.340 0.000	13.422 0.000		
Wyoming	Park		3.930	6.325	Winter closure gate	
Wyoming	Park		3.930	6.325	Pilot Creek Parking Lot	Section between Pilot Creek Parking Lot and WYO 296 open year-round
Wyoming	Park		9.017	14.511	Chief Joseph Scenic Byway (WYO 296 east)	Section between Pilot Creek Parking Lot and WYO 296 open year-round
Wyoming	Park		9.017	14.511	Winter closure gate	
Wyoming	Park		28.600	46.027	Beartooth Pass – elevation 10,974 ft (3,345 m)	
Wyoming–Montana state line			34.764 43.104	55.947 69.369		
Montana	Carbon		55.709	89.655	Winter closure gate	
Montana	Carbon	Red Lodge	66.799	107.503	S-308 east – Belfry	
Montana	Carbon	Red Lodge	68.291	109.904	MT 78 north (Third Street) – Absarokee, Columbus	Roundabout; Beartooth Highway eastern terminus
Montana	Carbon	Joliet	92.982	149.640	S-421 north – Columbus	
Montana	Carbon	Rockvale	99.791	160.598	US 310 west – Bridger	Western end of US 310 concurrency
Montana	Carbon	Laurel	112.436	180.948	I-90 west – Butte US 310 north (Main Street) to I-90 BL	I-90 exit 434; eastern end of US 310 concurrency; western end of I-90 concurrency
Montana	See I-90 (exits 434–510)					
Montana	Big Horn	Crow Agency	189.084	304.301	I-90 west / US 87 south – Sheridan	I-90 exit 510; eastern end of I-90 / US 87 (continuation from exit 452) concurrency
Montana	Big Horn	Crow Agency	189.633	305.185	Battlefield Tour Road (S-342 south) – Little Bighorn Battlefield National Monument	
Montana	Big Horn	Busby	212.706	342.317	S-314 south – Decker, Sheridan	
Montana	Rosebud	Lame Deer	231.026	371.800	MT 39 north to I-94 / Cheyenne Avenue – Colstrip, Business District	Roundabout
Montana	Rosebud	Ashland	251.079	404.072	S-447 north – St. Labre Mission, Miles City	
Montana	Rosebud	Ashland	251.710	405.088	S-566 south – Birney	
Montana	Powder River		255.202	410.708	S-484 south (Otter Creek Road) – Fort Howes	
Montana	Powder River		292.405	470.580	MT 59 south – Birney	Western end of MT 59 concurrency
Montana	Powder River	Broadus	295.075	474.877	S-391 south (Moorehead Road)	
Montana	Powder River		296.971	477.928	S-398 north (Powder River East Road) – Powderville	
Montana	Powder River		299.523	482.036	MT 59 south – Gillette	Eastern end of MT 59 concurrency
Montana	Carter	Boyes	318.162	512.032	S-544 south – Belle Creek	
Montana	Carter		325.616	524.028	S-277 north – Ekalaka	
Montana	Carter	Alzada	353.068	568.208	S-323 north – Ekalaka	
Montana	Carter	Alzada	353.425	568.782	S-326 south – Hulett, Devils Tower	To WYO 112 south
Montana–Wyoming state line			355.996 0.00	572.920 0.00		
Wyoming	Crook	No major junctions				
Wyoming–South Dakota state line			20.450	32.911	US 212 east – Belle Fourche	Continuation into South Dakota
1.000 mi = 1.609 km; 1.000 km = 0.621 mi: Closed/former; Concurrency terminus; Tolled

== See also ==
U.S. Route 212
Previous state: Terminus	Montana; Wyoming	Next state: South Dakota
