= Index Peak (Wyoming) =

Mountain in the USA

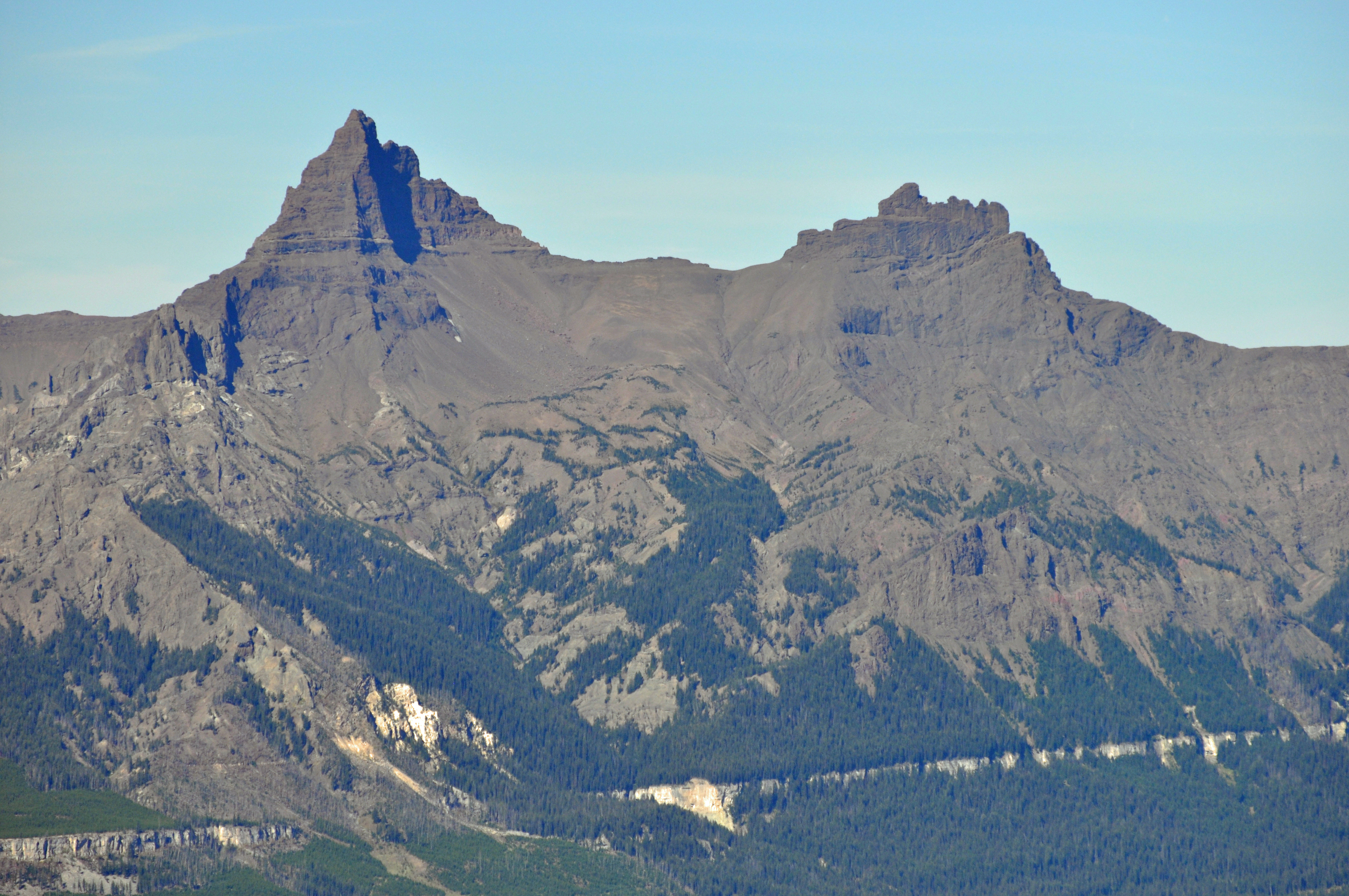
- Index Peak (right)

Highest point
- Elevation: 10,709 feet (3,264 m)
- Coordinates: 44°59′10″N 109°53′04″W

Geography
- Location within Wyoming
- Parent range: Absaroka Range

Index Peak, el. 10,709 feet (3,264 m), is a prominent mountain peak in the Absaroka Range in Park County, Wyoming. The peak is visible from US Route 212, the Beartooth Highway just east of the Northeast Entrance Station to Yellowstone National Park. Pilot Peak rises just south of Index Peak.
