= Wyoming Highway 296 =

State highway in Park County, Wyoming, United States

Wyoming Highway 296
- Chief Joseph Scenic Byway
- WYO 296 highlighted in red

Route information
- Maintained by WYDOT
- Length: 45.971 mi (73.983 km)
- Tourist routes: Scenic byway

Major junctions
- West end: US 212 east-southeast of Cooke City MT
- East end: WYO 120 northwest of Cody

Location
- Country: United States
- State: Wyoming
- Counties: Park

Highway system
- Wyoming State Highway System; Interstate; US; State
← WYO 295	→ US 310

Wyoming Highway 296 (WYO 296), also known as the Chief Joseph Scenic Byway, is a 45.97-mile (73.98 km) state highway in northern Park County, Wyoming, United States, that connects U.S. Route 212 (US 212), east-southeast of Cooke City, Montana with Wyoming Highway 120 (WYO 120), north-northwest of Cody

== Route description ==
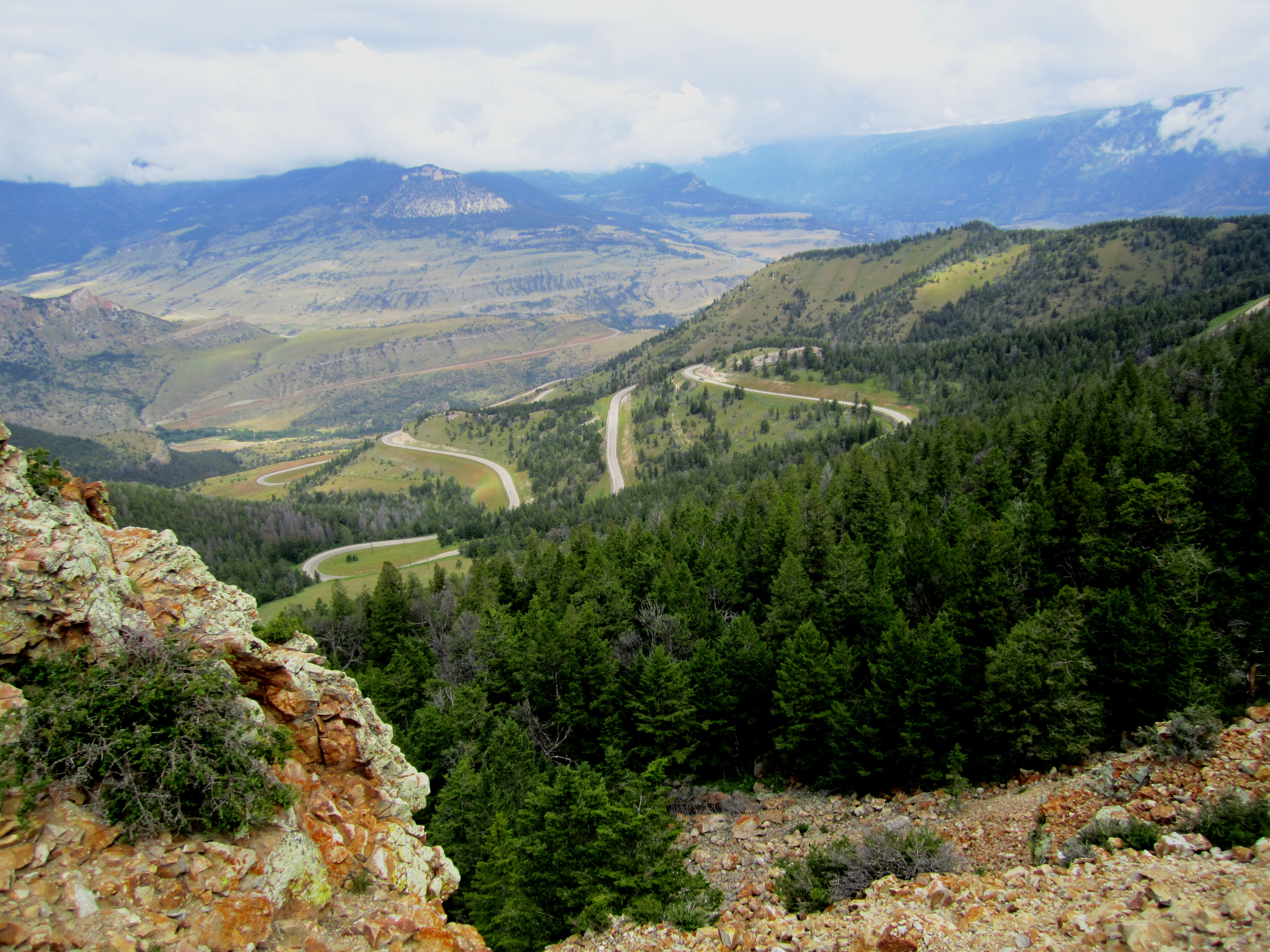
The view from the top of Dead Indian Pass on the Chief Joseph Scenic Byway, July 2014

WYO 296 follows the route taken by Chief Joseph as he led the Nez Perce out of Yellowstone National Park and into Montana in 1877 during their attempt to flee the United States Cavalry and escape into Canada. It crosses Sunlight Creek Bridge, the highest in Wyoming.

WYO 296 begins at a T intersection with US 212 (Beartooth Highway), roughly 13 miles (21 km) southeast of Cooke City. From its western terminus WYO 296 travels southeasterly as it winds through the Shoshone National Forest and through the Absaroka Range and then passes through Dead Indian Pass. After almost 46 miles (74 km), WYO 296 reaches its eastern terminus at T intersection with WYO 120, about 17 miles (27 km) north-northwest of Cody.

== Major intersections ==
The entire route is in Park County.

Location	mi	km	Destinations	Notes
	0.00	0.00	US 212 (Beartooth Highway) – Cooke City, Red Lodge	Western terminus; US 212 (Beartooth Highway) subject to seasonal closures
	32.960	53.044	Dead Indian Pass – elevation 8,071 ft (2,460 m)	
	45.971	73.983	WYO 120 (Belfy Highway) – Belfry, Cody	Eastern terminus
1.000 mi = 1.609 km; 1.000 km = 0.621 mi

== See also ==
- List of state highways in Wyoming

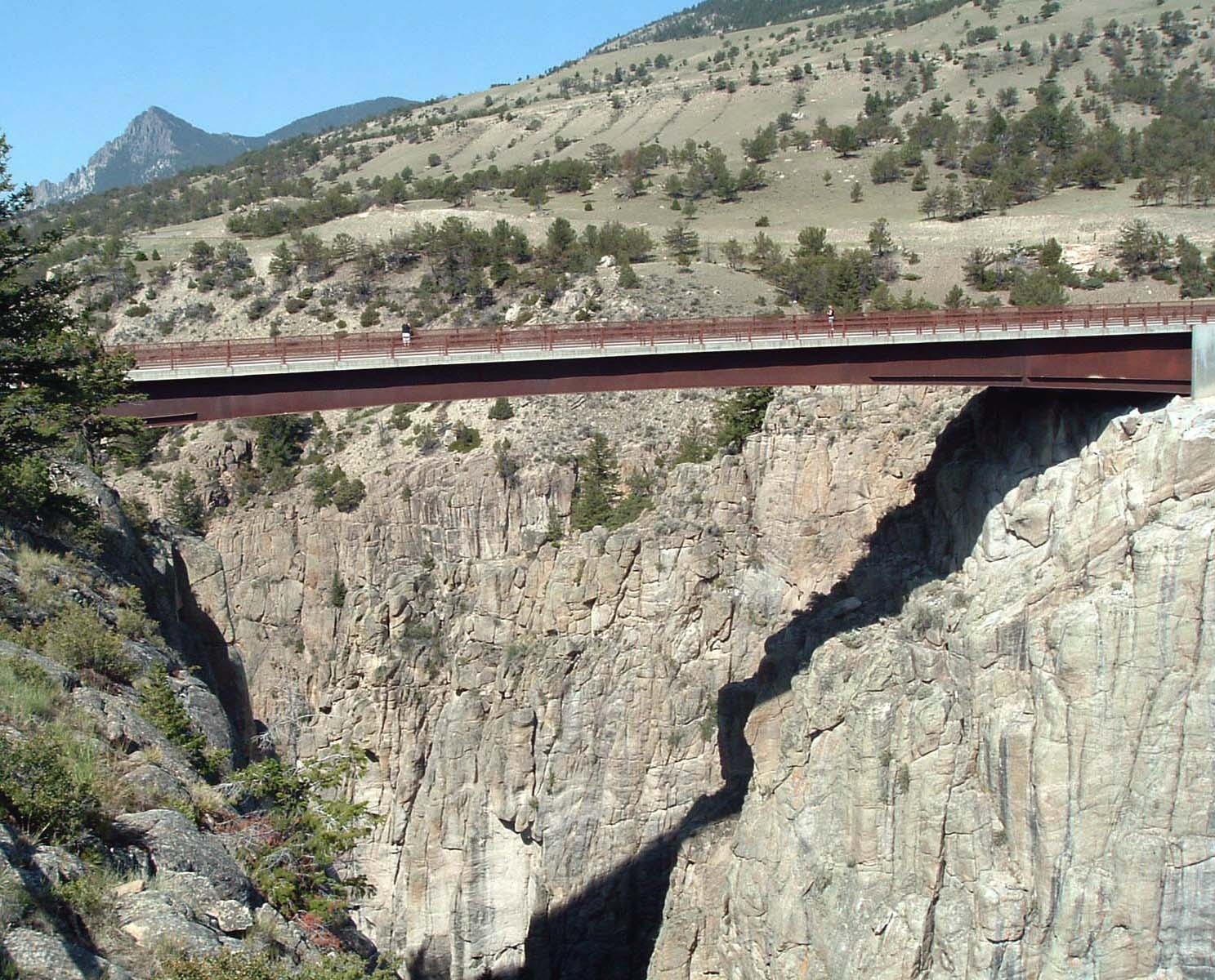
Sunlight Bridge over Sunlight Creek on Chief Joseph Scenic Highway
