= Montana Highway 78 =

State highway in Montana, United States

Montana Highway 78
- MT 78 highlighted in red

Route information
- Maintained by MDT
- Length: 47.714 mi (76.788 km)

Major junctions
- South end: US 212 at Red Lodge
- North end: I-90 at Columbus

Location
- Country: United States
- State: Montana
- Counties: Carbon, Stillwater

Highway system
- Montana Highway System; Interstate; US; State; Secondary
← MT 77	→ MT 80

Montana Highway 78 (MT 78) in the U.S. state of Montana is a state highway running in a northerly direction from an intersection with U.S. Highway 212 (US 212) at the city of Red Lodge. It runs through Roscoe and Absarokee. The highway extends about 49 miles (79 km) to a northern terminus at Interstate 90 (I-90) in the town of Columbus.

== History ==
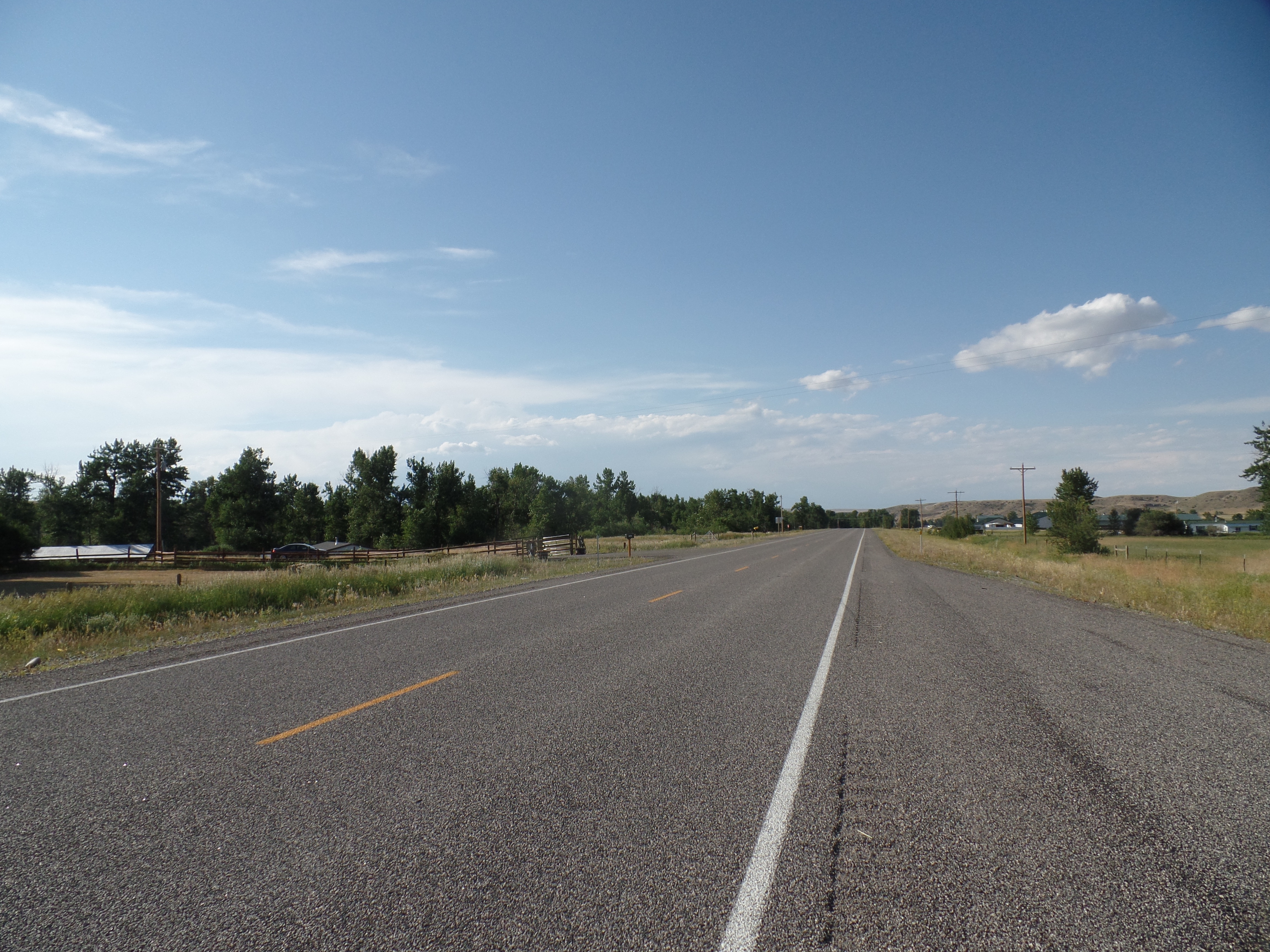
Montana Highway 78 northbound

Before receiving its present designation in 1978, MT 78 was designated as Montana Secondary Highway 307 (S-307).

== Major intersections ==
County	Location	mi	km	Destinations	Notes
Carbon	Red Lodge	0.000	0.000	US 212 – Cooke City, Billings	Roundabout
Stillwater	Columbus	47.714	76.788	I-90 – Billings, Butte	
1.000 mi = 1.609 km; 1.000 km = 0.621 mi
