= Beartooth Basin Summer Ski Area =

Ski area in Wyoming, United States

Beartooth Basin Ski Area
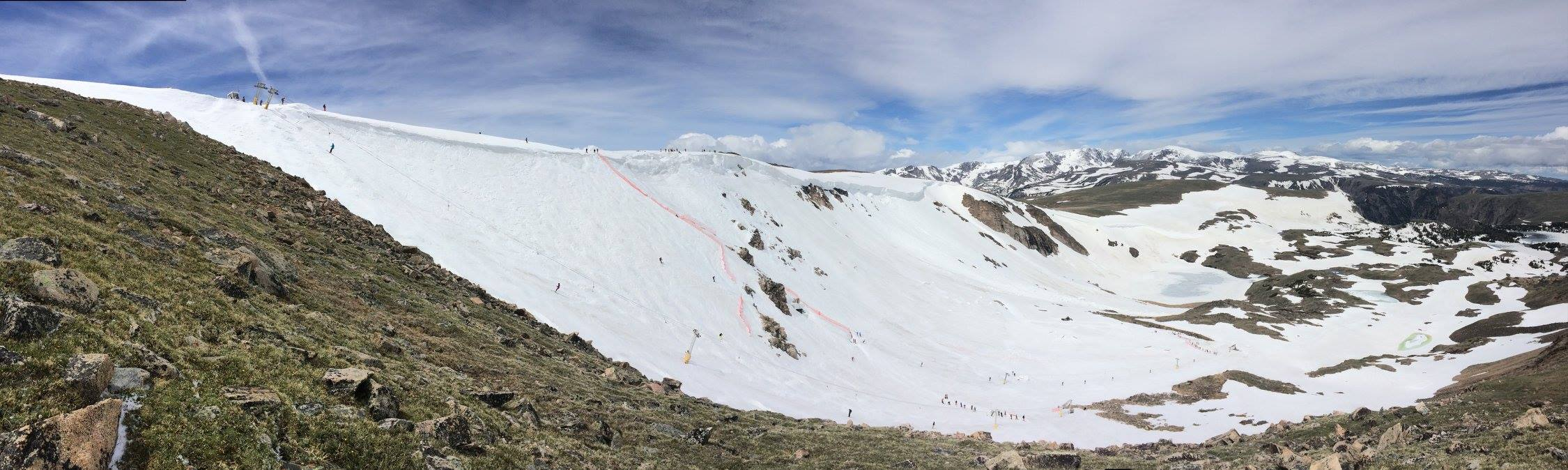
- June 2017

- Location in the United States Location in Wyoming
- Location: Beartooth National Forest; Park County, Wyoming, U.S.
- Coordinates: 44.975°N 109.435°W
- Top elevation: 10,900 ft (3,320 m) AMSL
- Skiable area: 600 acres (2.4 km^{2})
- Trails: 9
- Lift system: 2 surface lifts
- Terrain parks: 1 – Big Air Park
- Snowmaking: None
- Night skiing: No
- Website: beartoothbasin.com

Beartooth Basin Ski Area is a ski area in the western United States in northern Wyoming, located at Beartooth Pass in the Shoshone National Forest near the Montana border. It is the only ski area in North America that is only open in the summer, generally from late May through early July, since U.S. Route 212 (Beartooth Highway) is closed in winter. Opened in 1962, it totals 600 acres (2.4 km^{2}) at an elevation of 10,900 feet (3,320 m).

The north-facing slopes of Beartooth Basin are served by two platter lifts, and there is no day lodge. Parking is alongside the highway at the pass, slightly above the summit of the ski area.

== Climate ==
Beartooth Pass has an alpine climate (Köppen ETH),

Climate data for Beartooth Pass 44.9692 N, 109.4668 W, Elevation: 10,873 ft (3,314 m) (1991–2020 normals)
Month	Jan	Feb	Mar	Apr	May	Jun	Jul	Aug	Sep	Oct	Nov	Dec	Year
Mean daily maximum °F (°C)	20.6 (−6.3)	20.6 (−6.3)	26.4 (−3.1)	32.5 (0.3)	41.7 (5.4)	51.3 (10.7)	61.8 (16.6)	60.8 (16.0)	51.3 (10.7)	37.6 (3.1)	26.1 (−3.3)	19.6 (−6.9)	37.5 (3.1)
Daily mean °F (°C)	12.0 (−11.1)	11.1 (−11.6)	16.0 (−8.9)	21.2 (−6.0)	30.1 (−1.1)	39.1 (3.9)	48.2 (9.0)	47.5 (8.6)	39.1 (3.9)	27.3 (−2.6)	17.5 (−8.1)	11.4 (−11.4)	26.7 (−2.9)
Mean daily minimum °F (°C)	3.5 (−15.8)	1.6 (−16.9)	5.6 (−14.7)	9.9 (−12.3)	18.5 (−7.5)	26.8 (−2.9)	34.7 (1.5)	34.2 (1.2)	26.8 (−2.9)	17.0 (−8.3)	9.0 (−12.8)	3.2 (−16.0)	15.9 (−9.0)
Average precipitation inches (mm)	4.99 (127)	4.62 (117)	4.65 (118)	4.29 (109)	4.39 (112)	2.99 (76)	2.00 (51)	1.78 (45)	2.04 (52)	3.02 (77)	4.44 (113)	4.98 (126)	44.19 (1,123)
Source: PRISM Climate Group

Beartooth Lake has a subalpine climate (Köppen Dfc).

Climate data for Beartooth Lake, Wyoming (elevation 9,360 feet or 2,853 meters), 1991–2020 normals:
Month	Jan	Feb	Mar	Apr	May	Jun	Jul	Aug	Sep	Oct	Nov	Dec	Year
Mean daily maximum °F (°C)	23.7 (−4.6)	26.1 (−3.3)	34.0 (1.1)	40.9 (4.9)	49.5 (9.7)	57.1 (13.9)	66.7 (19.3)	64.7 (18.2)	55.2 (12.9)	41.1 (5.1)	29.2 (−1.6)	22.3 (−5.4)	42.5 (5.9)
Daily mean °F (°C)	15.7 (−9.1)	16.4 (−8.7)	23.0 (−5.0)	28.9 (−1.7)	37.9 (3.3)	45.2 (7.3)	53.2 (11.8)	51.8 (11.0)	44.1 (6.7)	32.5 (0.3)	21.4 (−5.9)	14.5 (−9.7)	32.1 (0.0)
Mean daily minimum °F (°C)	7.7 (−13.5)	6.8 (−14.0)	11.9 (−11.2)	16.7 (−8.5)	26.3 (−3.2)	33.3 (0.7)	39.7 (4.3)	38.9 (3.8)	33.0 (0.6)	23.9 (−4.5)	13.5 (−10.3)	6.9 (−13.9)	21.5 (−5.8)
Average precipitation inches (mm)	3.81 (97)	3.44 (87)	3.48 (88)	3.43 (87)	3.21 (82)	2.79 (71)	1.67 (42)	1.36 (35)	1.85 (47)	2.67 (68)	3.40 (86)	3.92 (100)	35.03 (890)
Source 1: XMACIS
Source 2: NOAA (Precipitation)
