= Cooke City-Silver Gate, Montana =

- Former CDP
- Location of Cooke City-Silver Gate, Montana
- Coordinates: 45°1′3″N 109°56′19″W
- Country: United States
- State: Montana
- County: Park

Area
  - Total: 10.0 sq mi (25.9 km^{2})
  - Land: 10.0 sq mi (25.9 km^{2})
  - Water: 0 sq mi (0.0 km^{2})
- Elevation: 7,608 ft (2,318.9 m)

Population (2000)
  - Total: 140
  - Density: 14/sq mi (5.4/km^{2})
- Time zone: UTC-7 (Mountain (MST))
  - Summer (DST): UTC-6 (MDT)
- Area code: 406
- FIPS code: 30-17359

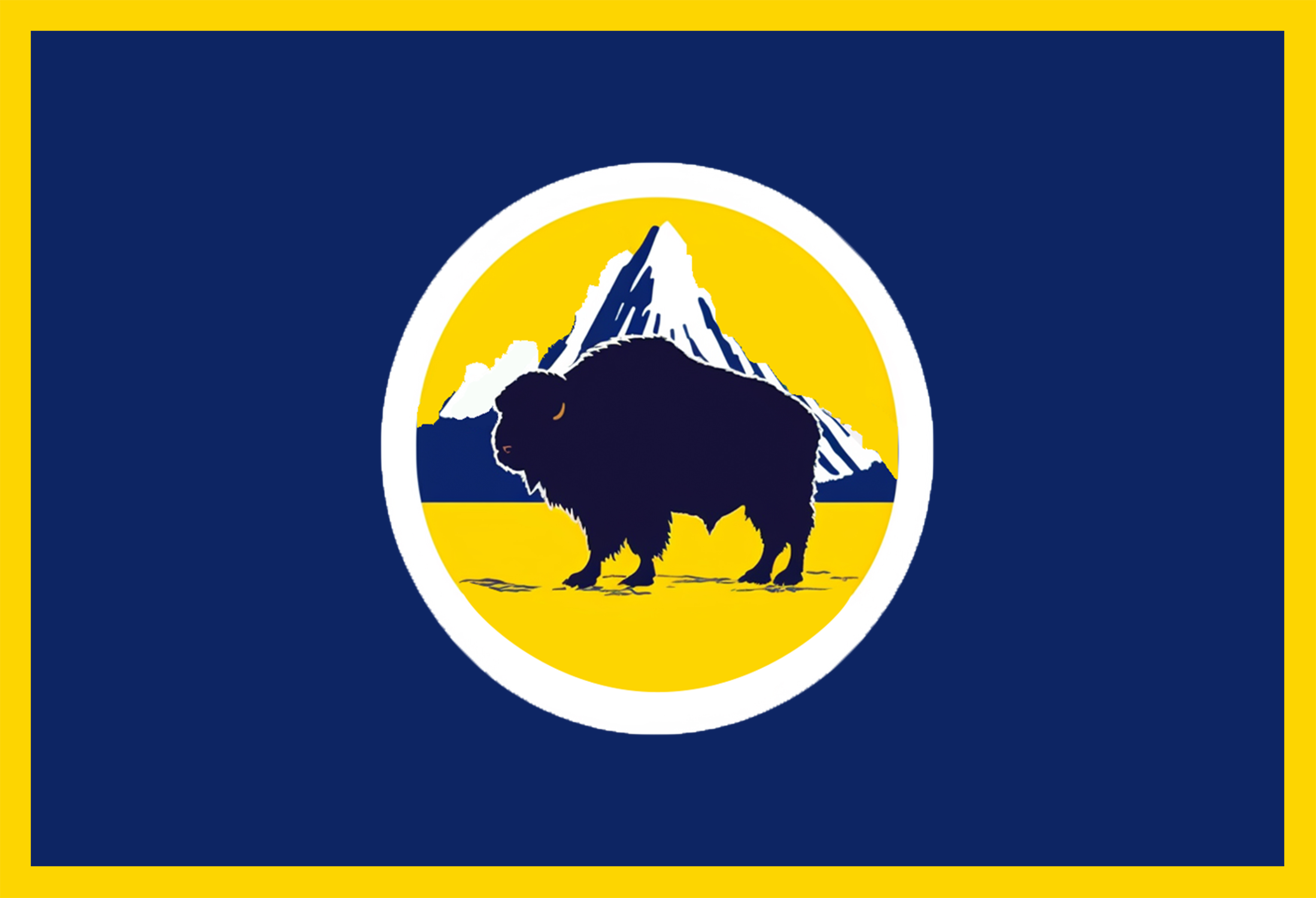
Regional Flag (unofficial)

Cooke City-Silver Gate was a census-designated place (CDP) in Park County, Montana, United States, corresponding to the unincorporated communities of Cooke City and Silver Gate. The population was 140 at the 2000 census. Starting with the 2010 census, the two communities were listed as separate CDPs. The communities sit toward the northeast of Yellowstone National Park on the Beartooth Highway.

== Geography ==
The Cooke City-Silver Gate CDP was located at 45°1′3″N 109°56′19″W (45.017378, −109.938599), at an elevation of 7,608 feet (2,318 m).

According to the United States Census Bureau, the CDP had a total area of 10.0 square miles (26 km^{2}), all land.

== Demographics ==
As of the census of 2000, there were 140 people, 79 households, and 27 families residing in the CDP. The population density was 14.0 inhabitants per square mile (5.4/km^{2}). There were 247 housing units at an average density of 24.7 per square mile (9.5/km^{2}). The racial makeup of the CDP was 97.86% White, 0.71% African American, 0.71% Native American, and 0.71% from two or more races.

There were 79 households, out of which 11.4% had children under the age of 18 living with them, 29.1% were married couples living together, 5.1% had a female householder with no husband present, and 65.8% were non-families. 40.5% of all households were made up of individuals, and 11.4% had someone living alone who was 65 years of age or older. The average household size was 1.77 and the average family size was 2.44.

In the CDP, the population was spread out, with 8.6% under the age of 18, 4.3% from 18 to 24, 42.1% from 25 to 44, 35.0% from 45 to 64, and 10.0% who were 65 years of age or older. The median age was 43 years. For every 100 females, there were 122.2 males. For every 100 females age 18 and over, there were 113.3 males.

The median income for a household in the CDP was $25,000, and the median income for a family was $50,625. Males had a median income of $38,125 versus $17,813 for females. The per capita income for the CDP was $31,618. There were 7.4% of families and 15.8% of the population living below the poverty line, including 18.2% of under eighteens and 10.5% of those over 64.
