= 6s8 =

6s8 or 6S8 may refer to:

- KSVK 12.7 anti-material rifle
- Laurel Municipal Airport, Montana, United States
