= Colony, Wyoming =

Colony
- Unincorporated Community
- Location within the state of Wyoming Colony (the United States)
- Coordinates: 44°52′12″N 104°9′19″W
- Country: United States
- State: Wyoming
- County: Crook
- Elevation: 3,422 ft (1,043 m)
- Time zone: UTC-7 (Mountain (MST))
  - Summer (DST): UTC-6 (MDT)
- ZIP code: 57717
- GNIS feature ID: 1585386

Colony is an unincorporated community in northeastern Crook County, Wyoming, United States. The community lies along U.S. Route 212, 14.2 miles (22.9 km) southeast of the Montana state line and 6.3 miles (10.1 km) northwest of the South Dakota state line.
