= Laurel, Montana =

City in Montana, United States

- City
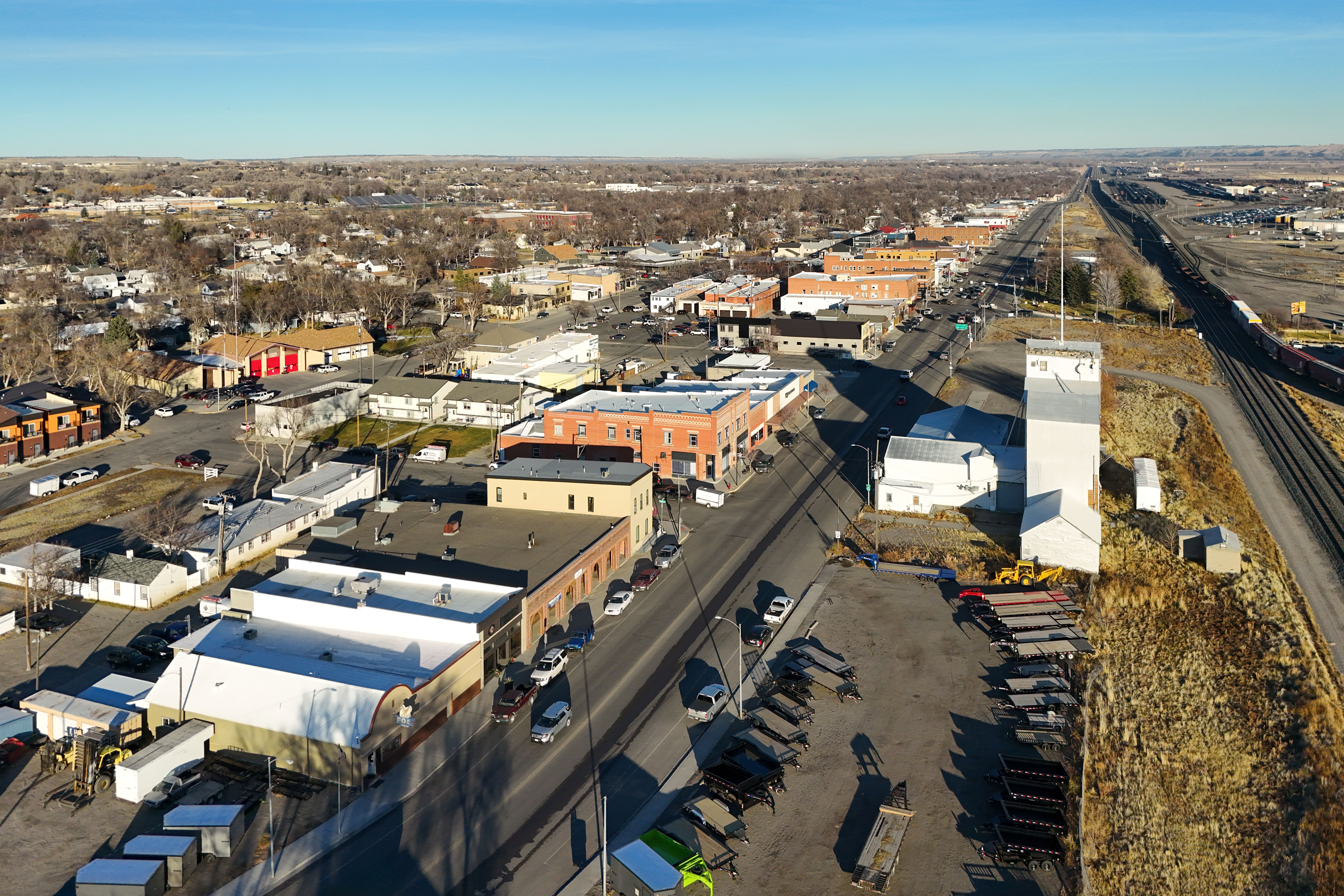
- Downtown Laurel

- Seal

- Location of Laurel, Montana
- Coordinates: 45°40′09″N 108°46′18″W
- Country: United States
- State: Montana
- County: Yellowstone
- Settled: 1879
- Incorporated: October 10, 1908

Government
  - Type: Mayor – Alderman
  - Mayor: Kris Vogele
  - City Attorney: Ryan Addis
  - Police Chief: Jarred Anglin
  - Fire Chief: J.W. Hopper
  - City Planner: Vacant

Area
  - City: 2.607 sq mi (6.752 km^{2})
  - Land: 2.605 sq mi (6.746 km^{2})
  - Water: 0.0015 sq mi (0.004 km^{2})
- Elevation: 3,301 ft (1,006 m)

Population (2020)
  - City: 7,222
  - Estimate (2022): 7,203
  - Density: 3,310/sq mi (1,279/km^{2})
  - Urban: 8,789
  - Urban density: 1,481/sq mi (571.8/km^{2})
  - Metro: 190,208
  - Metro density: 29.4/sq mi (11.34/km^{2})
- Time zone: UTC–7 (Mountain (MST))
  - Summer (DST): UTC–6 (MDT)
- ZIP Code: 59044
- Area code: 406
- FIPS code: 30-42700
- GNIS feature ID: 0773254
- Website: cityoflaurelmontana.com

Laurel is a city in Yellowstone County, Montana, United States and the third largest community in the Billings Metropolitan Statistical Area. Laurel is located in the Yellowstone Valley as an east–west terminal division point of the BNSF Railway. The population was 7,222 at the 2020 census.

Laurel is home to a Cenex Harvest States oil refinery and BNSF's Laurel Yard, the largest rail yard between St. Paul, Minnesota and Pasco, Washington.

== History ==
Before Laurel became a city or a community, people passed through the site during the gold rush period, when gold was discovered at the Clarks Fork headwaters. They came by team and wagon, and by small steamer vessels up the Yellowstone River. The government was in the process of planning a railroad to the west coast, and had surveying crews out to map the country on the most direct route. Many of the prospectors that went west in search of gold, felt gold might be found in other parts of the state, so some returned to the Yellowstone Valley, and others came from the East to settle here. However, this did not take place until after the Custer Massacre in 1876. It was not until 1877 that the white man felt safe in the Yellowstone Valley, after the power of the Sioux was broken. So it was that while the memory of the Massacre of General Custer and his Command on the Little Big Horn River was still fresh in the minds of settlers of Montana, that a little community was established in the Yellowstone Valley.

The history of Laurel began when settlers began making their homes in the vicinity in 1879. There was a section house built that served as a depot and post office, situated about where Hobo Hill is, or near the center of the present railroad yards east of Laurel. The railroad pushed closer to Laurel from the east, up the Yellowstone Valley during the summer of 1882. Up to this time, there were about 200 people in the community. With the advent of the railroad, the population grew to 368 in 1900, 806 in 1910, and 2,338 in 1920.

Laurel was originally known as the station of Carlton. However, by 1883, its name was changed to Laurel, after a local shrub. The post office was established in 1886. Laurel was considered a town in 1906, but it was not until August 1908 that it became incorporated, and two months later, on October 10, 1908, city government was established with the election of a city council and mayor.

== Geography ==
Laurel is located at 45°40′26″N 108°46′15″W (45.673986, -108.770893). It is 3300 feet (1006 m) above sea level.

According to the United States Census Bureau, the city has a total area of 2.605 square miles (6.75 km^{2}), is land and 0.002 square miles (0.01 km^{2}), is water.

Most of Laurel is positioned on the northern side of the Yellowstone River. The Clarks Fork joins the Yellowstone approximately 2 mi (3 km) southeast of town.

=== Climate ===
Climate data for Laurel, Montana
Month	Jan	Feb	Mar	Apr	May	Jun	Jul	Aug	Sep	Oct	Nov	Dec	Year
Record high °F (°C)	68 (20)	72 (22)	80 (27)	90 (32)	96 (36)	105 (41)	111 (44)	105 (41)	103 (39)	90 (32)	77 (25)	73 (23)	108 (42)
Mean daily maximum °F (°C)	33 (1)	40 (4)	48 (9)	58 (14)	67 (19)	78 (26)	86 (30)	84 (29)	72 (22)	59 (15)	43 (6)	35 (2)	59 (15)
Mean daily minimum °F (°C)	15 (−9)	20 (−7)	26 (−3)	35 (2)	44 (7)	53 (12)	58 (14)	57 (14)	47 (8)	37 (3)	26 (−3)	18 (−8)	36 (3)
Record low °F (°C)	−30 (−34)	−38 (−39)	−19 (−28)	−5 (−21)	14 (−10)	32 (0)	41 (5)	35 (2)	22 (−6)	−7 (−22)	−22 (−30)	−32 (−36)	−38 (−39)
Average precipitation inches (mm)	0.81 (21)	0.58 (15)	1.12 (28)	1.74 (44)	2.48 (63)	1.89 (48)	1.28 (33)	0.85 (22)	1.34 (34)	1.26 (32)	0.75 (19)	0.67 (17)	14.77 (375)
Source: all-time extreme temperature

== Demographics ==
Historical population
Census	Pop.	Note	%±
1890	50		—
1900	368		636.0%
1910	806		119.0%
1920	2,338		190.1%
1930	2,558		9.4%
1940	2,754		7.7%
1950	3,663		33.0%
1960	4,601		25.6%
1970	4,454		−3.2%
1980	5,481		23.1%
1990	5,686		3.7%
2000	6,255		10.0%
2010	6,718		7.4%
2020	7,222		7.5%
2022 (est.)	7,203		−0.3%
source: U.S. Decennial Census; 2020 Census

=== 2020 census ===
As of the 2020 census, Laurel had a population of 7,222 people and 1,859 families. The median age was 38.5 years. 25.0% of residents were under the age of 18 and 17.8% of residents were 65 years of age or older. For every 100 females there were 99.0 males, and for every 100 females age 18 and over there were 95.6 males age 18 and over.

100.0% of residents lived in urban areas, while 0.0% lived in rural areas.

There were 2,960 households in Laurel, of which 31.5% had children under the age of 18 living in them. Of all households, 45.5% were married-couple households, 19.4% were households with a male householder and no spouse or partner present, and 26.7% were households with a female householder and no spouse or partner present. About 30.3% of all households were made up of individuals and 14.0% had someone living alone who was 65 years of age or older.

There were 3,128 housing units, of which 5.4% were vacant. The homeowner vacancy rate was 1.6% and the rental vacancy rate was 5.9%.

Racial composition as of the 2020 census
Race	Number	Percent
White	6,452	89.3%
Black or African American	23	0.3%
American Indian and Alaska Native	134	1.9%
Asian	42	0.6%
Native Hawaiian and Other Pacific Islander	0	0.0%
Some other race	79	1.1%
Two or more races	492	6.8%
Hispanic or Latino (of any race)	351	4.9%

=== 2010 census ===
As of the 2010 census, there were 6,718 people, 2,790 households, and 1,765 families living in the city. The population density was 3,139 inhabitants per square mile (1,212/km^{2}). There were 2,943 housing units at an average density of 1,375 per square mile (531/km^{2}). The racial makeup of the city was 95.3% White, 0.4% African American, 1.5% Native American, 0.4% Asian, 0.4% from other races, and 2.1% from two or more races. Hispanic or Latino of any race were 3.0% of the population.

There were 2,790 households, of which 32.4% had children under the age of 18 living with them, 47.1% were married couples living together, 10.9% had a female householder with no husband present, 5.3% had a male householder with no wife present, and 36.7% were non-families. 31.5% of all households were made up of individuals, and 14.9% had someone living alone who was 65 years of age or older. The average household size was 2.38 and the average family size was 2.99.

The median age in the city was 37 years. 25.3% of residents were under the age of 18; 7.8% were between the ages of 18 and 24; 26.1% were from 25 to 44; 24.8% were from 45 to 64; and 15.9% were 65 years of age or older. The gender makeup of the city was 48.0% male and 52.0% female.

=== 2000 census ===
As of the 2000 census, there were 6,255 people, 2,529 households, and 1,739 families living in the city. The population density was 3,318 inhabitants per square mile (1,281/km^{2}). There were 2,647 housing units at an average density of 1,404 inhabitants per square mile (542/km^{2}). The racial makeup of the city was 96.55% White, 0.16% African American, 1.17% Native American, 0.38% Asian, 0.02% Pacific Islander, 0.69% from other races, and 1.04% from two or more races. Hispanic or Latino of any race were 2.41% of the population.

There were 2,529 households, out of which 32.6% had children under the age of 18 living with them, 54.6% were married couples living together, 10.1% had a female householder with no husband present, and 31.2% were non-families. 27.7% of all households were made up of individuals, and 14.6% had someone living alone who was 65 years of age or older. The average household size was 2.44 and the average family size was 2.96.

In the city, the population was spread out, with 25.9% under the age of 18, 7.9% from 18 to 24, 27.2% from 25 to 44, 22.2% from 45 to 64, and 16.8% who were 65 years of age or older. The median age was 38 years. For every 100 females, there were 91.4 males. For every 100 females age 18 and over, there were 89.0 males.

The median income for a household in the city was $32,679, and the median income for a family was $40,068. Males had a median income of $33,370 versus $17,201 for females. The per capita income for the city was $16,953. About 7.9% of families and 10.8% of the population were below the poverty line, including 13.3% of those under age 18 and 11.3% of those age 65 or over.

== Economy ==
Cenex Harvest States oil refinery, BNSF Railway, Laurel School District 7-70, and Wood's Power Grip comprise the major employers in Laurel. Farming and ranching provide other important mainstays.

The Billings Bench Water Association Canal, used for irrigation, starts in Laurel.

== Government ==
The City of Laurel operates with a mayor and city council. Full executive authority is vested in the mayor, who is elected at-large for a four-year term. The mayor presides over the meetings of the city council and appoints and charges regular and special committees of the city council. The mayor is eligible to vote only in cases of a tie, but may be heard at all times. The mayor may veto all city council actions, including line items within a budget resolution, and that veto may be overridden by two-thirds of the whole membership of the city council.

In November 2007, the citizens of Laurel approved a city charter with self-governing powers. This allows for the position of Chief Administrative Officer to supervise the city's operations.

Legislative authority is vested in the city council, which is composed of eight members elected to four-year terms by the residents of the Ward within which the respective council member resides. The city council has management and control of the city's finances and property. The city council has the power to adopt ordinances and regulations consistent with state and federal law for the good government, preservation of good order, benefit of trade and commerce, protection of the quality of life within the city, and, as necessary, to carry out the purposes of the government of the City of Laurel.

Kris Vogele became mayor in June 2026 by selection of the City Council. Vogele will complete the term of previous mayor David Waggoner. Waggoner resigned in May 2026, citing health issues. He had won re-election for mayor in November 2025. His first term as mayor began with the November 2021 elections.

Waggoner replaced Thomas Nelson. Nelson died days before the 2021 election. Nelson was initially appointed mayor in January 2018, after Waggoner, who won the election, did not take office.

== Arts and culture ==
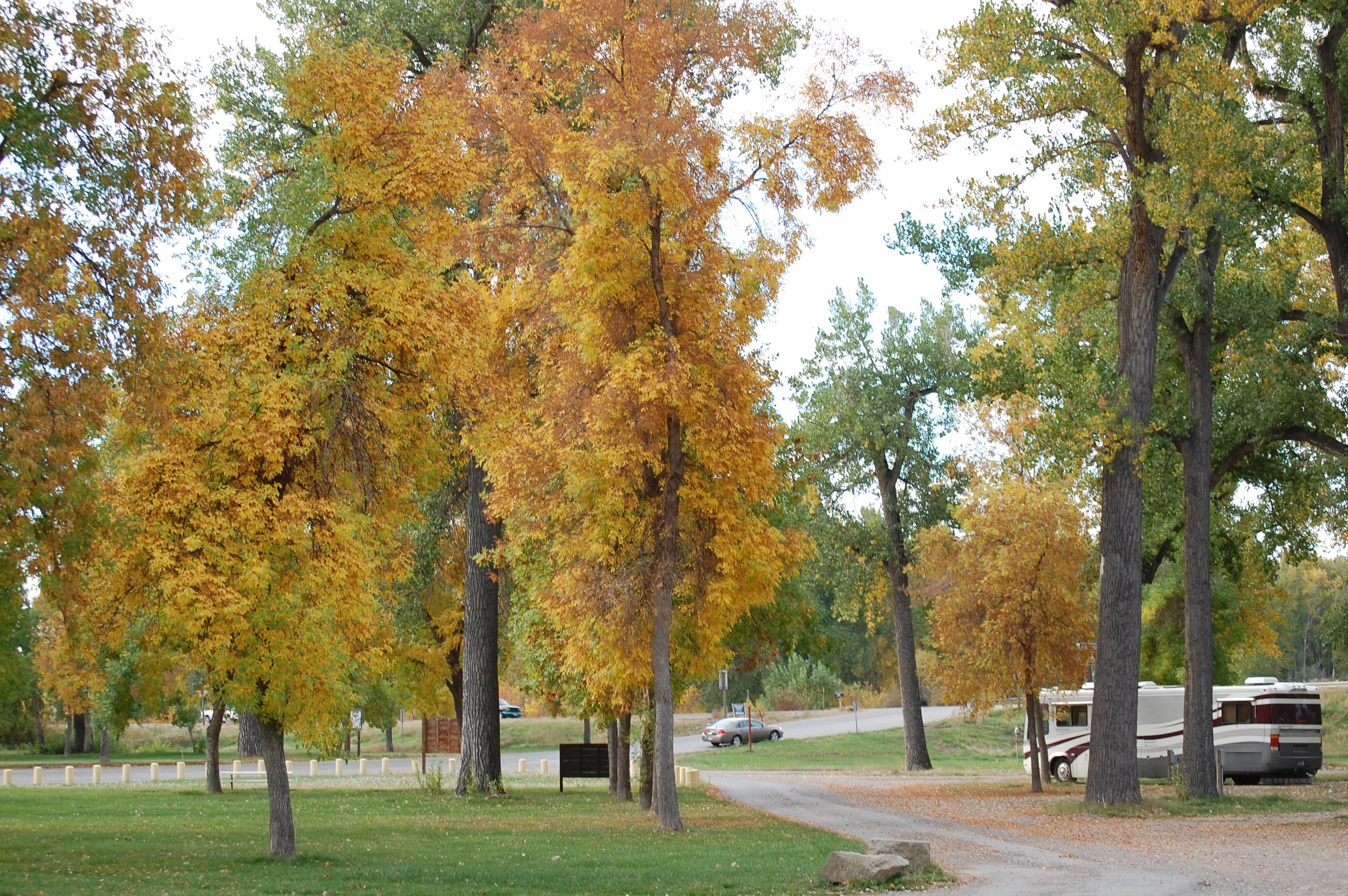
Riverside Park along the Nez Perce National Historic Trail

Laurel is home to the Yellowstone National Cemetery, a United States national cemetery.

In addition to firefighting and rescue, the fire department is known for its world-class Fourth of July fireworks, rated as one of the top 10 events in the Northwest. They also have a fireworks show after the Christmas parade.

Laurel's 18-hole golf course first opened in 1968 and welcomed a new clubhouse in 2023. There is a frisbee golf course, horseshoe pits at 2 parks, and a basketball court at Kiwanis Park. A non-profit group has been raising funds to build a large recreation complex. The completed complex will include a community center, gymnasium, competition style pool, and skate park.

Other attractions near the Laurel area include Yellowstone National Park, the Little Bighorn Battlefield National Monument, and Pompey's Pillar National Monument (where in 1806, William Clark carved his name).

Laurel Public Library serves the town.

Laurel has been recognized as a Tree City USA for multiple years.

== Infrastructure ==
Some of Laurel's residents commute the 15 miles (24 km) to Billings, Montana's largest city. Laurel is also significant as it lies on one of two main roads to Red Lodge, 45 miles (72 km) southwest on US 212; it is a popular mountain town and an end of the Beartooth Highway.

The City of Laurel has two types of public transit available to City residents: a Demand-Response Service and a Van Pool to Billings.

Laurel is served by the Laurel Municipal Airport, a publicly owned public-use airport, which is 2.4 miles (3.9 km) north of the central business district.

Intermountain Health maintains a medical clinic in Laurel. Hospital care is provided in nearby Billings.

=== Public safety ===
==== Police department ====
The Laurel Police Department is a member of the Montana Law Enforcement Testing Consortium (MTLETC).

The Laurel Police Department occasionally accepts applications from individuals who would like to volunteer their time to serve and protect the community. The LPD has had a reserve program for over 35 years.

==== Fire department ====
The Laurel Volunteer Fire Department provides firefighting and rescue emergency response for the town and 110 square miles (280 km^{2}) surrounding Laurel. The LVFD also provides mutual aid to Billings, Park City, and CHS Industrial Fire Departments; and assistance as needed to several surrounding Fire Departments, including Lockwood, Red Lodge, Columbus, Molt and Joliet.

The Fire Department is also known for award-winning Fire Prevention program. With the motto "Prevention through Education", the LVFD visits the children of Laurel several times a year, educating them on preventing fires and fire safety. The first week of October is named "Fire Prevention Week". The week is filled with visits to the schools by the Firefighters, an open house where the Department's doors are opened to the public and an hour-long program for the children of the community.

==== Ambulance service ====
The Laurel Volunteer Ambulance Service was created on June 1, 1976. The service is responsible for covering 183 square miles, including the territory within the city limits of Laurel. Before the service was formed, a local physician who owned and maintained an ambulance provided services and prehospital emergency care. As the needs of the citizens increased and calls for service became more frequent, the City felt an agency ran by city government was better equipped to provide for the people. The ambulance service has operated at the Basic Life Support level since 1976. The service is licensed through the Montana Department of Public Health and Human Services, and it requires each staff member to maintain a license of at least the Emergency Medical Technician level.

The service has maintained two ambulances for transport of patients, and also provides a Quick Response SUV for various emergency purposes. The ambulance service is dispatched from the Laurel 9-1-1 Center and responds to medical emergency calls within the service area. While the service is able to provide some advanced therapies, such as intravenous access and 12-lead ECG monitoring, advanced life support services are provided mainly by American Medical Response-Billings, St. Vincent HELP Flight, Red Lodge Fire-Rescue, and Columbus Fire-Rescue. Neighboring agencies are often called to assist the service in meeting the needs of citizens, and Laurel Ambulance Service also provides mutual aid support to the neighboring agencies as well.

As of 2016, there are 22 active Emergency Medical Technicians and Paramedics providing ambulance services to the citizens of Laurel.

== Education ==
The Laurel Public School District combines the Laurel Elementary School District and Laurel High School District. Matt Torix became superintendent in 2022.

The district has four schools. Laurel Elementary educates students from kindergarten to 2nd grade. Previously named West Elementary, the building was updated and expanded in 2025. Laurel Intermediate was newly built for the 2025-26 school year. Students there attend 3rd to 5th grade. Laurel Middle School educates students from 6th to 8th grade. Laurel High School has students from 9th to 12th grade. The school team is the Laurel Locomotives. School colors are purple and gold.

Laurel also has two private schools, both Christian based. First Baptist Academy teaches students from kindergarten to graduation. Branches Academy teaches through 8th grade.

== Media ==
The Laurel Outlook is a weekly newspaper based in Laurel. They have both printed papers and e-editions.

The FM radio station KRSQ is licensed in Laurel. It plays a top 40 music format.

== Notable people ==
- Chet Blaylock, former member of the Montana State Senate
- Patrick Casey, middle-distance runner at Montana State University and University of Oklahoma
- Richie Cortese, Pitcher, Philadelphia Phillies
