= Laurel Municipal Airport =

- IATA: none; ICAO: none; FAA LID: 6S8

Summary
- Airport type: Public
- Owner: Yellowstone County Airport Authority
- Operator: Yellowstone County
- Serves: Laurel & Billings
- Location: Laurel, Montana
- Elevation AMSL: 3,517 ft / 1,072 m
- Coordinates: 45°42′16″N 108°45′34″W

Maps
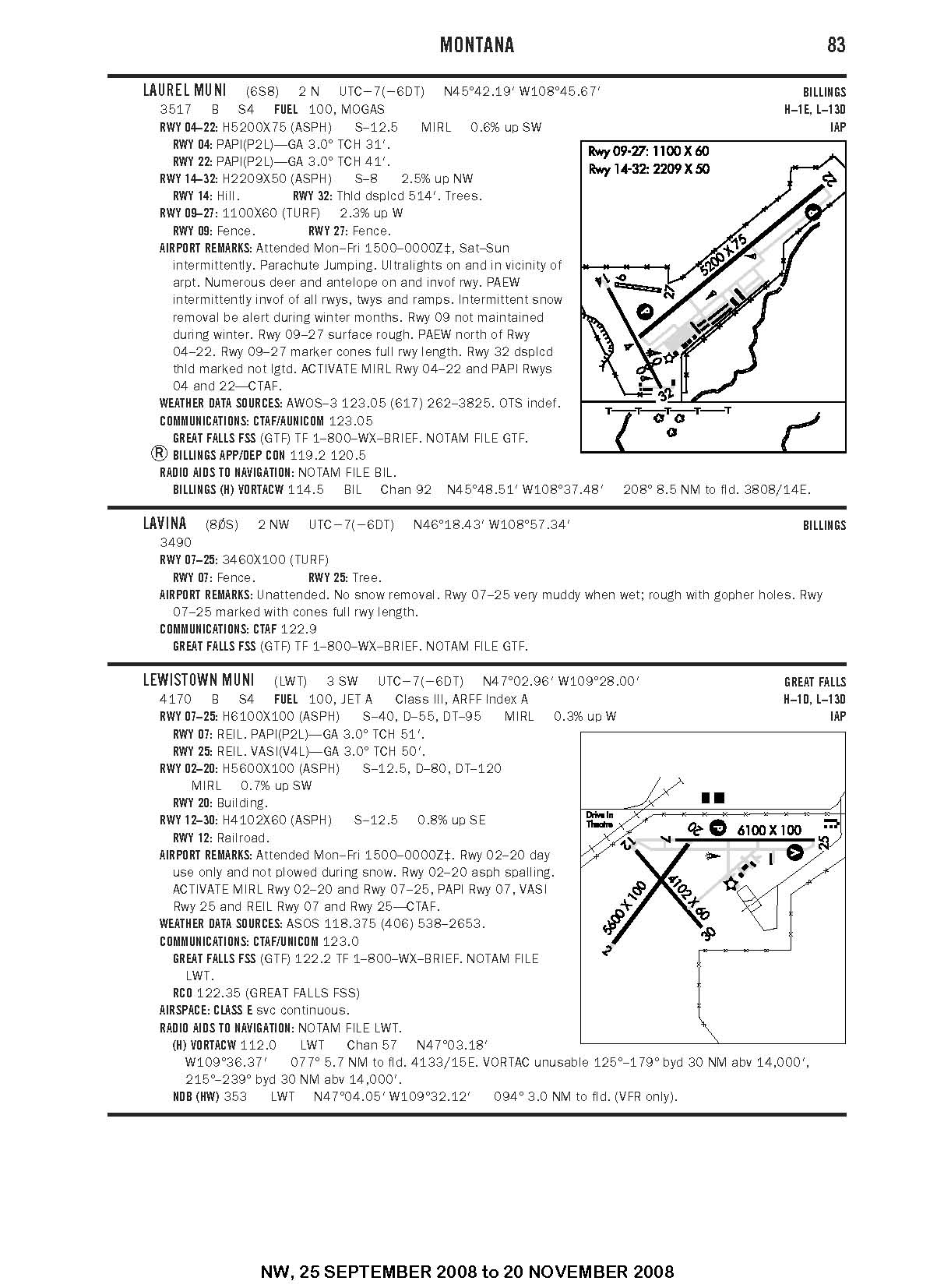
- FAA airport/facility directory, 2008

- Location in Montana

Runways
Direction	Length		Surface
Direction	ft	m	Surface
4/22	5,200	1,585	Asphalt
14/32	2,725	831	Asphalt
9/27	1,100	335	Turf

Statistics (2010)
- Aircraft operations: 41,900
- Based aircraft: 89
- Source: Federal Aviation Administration

Laurel Municipal Airport (FAA LID: 6S8) is two miles north of Laurel, in Yellowstone County, Montana, and eleven miles (18 km) southwest of Billings, Montana, United States. The National Plan of Integrated Airport Systems for 2011–2015 categorized it as a general aviation facility. It sees no airlines.

== Facilities ==
Laurel Municipal Airport covers 254 acres (103 ha) at an elevation of 3,517 feet (1,072 m). It has three runways: 4/22 is 5,200 by 75 feet (1,585 by 23 metres) asphalt; 14/32 is 2,725 by 50 feet (831 by 15 metres) asphalt; 9/27 is 1,100 by 60 feet (335 by 18 metres) turf.

In the year ending September 15, 2010 the airport had 41,900 general aviation aircraft operations, average 114 per day. 89 aircraft were then based at the airport: 84% single-engine, 6% multi-engine, 7% helicopter, and 3% ultralight.

Northern Skies Aviation is the only fixed-base operator.

== Accidents and incidents ==
On May 3, 2023, a plane crashed near Laurel after an oil pressure problem. The pilot decided to turn off the engine and divert to Laurel. About a quarter mile away from the airport, the plane stalled and impacted an open field. The left wing of the aircraft struck a fence post, causing it to spin into an irrigation ditch. The pilot survived and the aircraft subsequently was damaged. The NTSB determined that cylinder deterioration had caused a partial loss of engine power to the rear engine, causing a forced landing.

== See also ==
- List of airports in Montana
