= U.S. Route 212 =

U.S. Numbered Highway in Montana, Wyoming, South Dakota and Minnesota, United States

U.S. Route 212
- US 212 highlighted in red

Route information
- Auxiliary route of US 12
- Length: 950.68 mi (1,529.97 km)
- Existed: 1926–present

Major junctions
- West end: Yellowstone National Park
- I-90 / US 310 in Laurel, MT; I-94 in Lockwood, MT; US 85 in Belle Fourche, SD; US 83 near Gettysburg, SD; US 281 in Redfield, SD; US 81 in Watertown, SD; I-29 in Watertown, SD; US 75 near Madison, MN; US 59 in Montevideo, MN; US 71 in Olivia, MN
- East end: US 169 / MN 62 in Edina, MN

Location
- Country: United States
- States: Montana, Wyoming, South Dakota, Minnesota

Highway system
- United States Numbered Highway System; List; Special; Divided

U.S. Route 212 (US 212) is a spur of US 12. It runs for 949 miles (1,527 km) from Yellowstone National Park to Minnesota Highway 62 at Edina, Minnesota. It does not intersect US 12 now, but it once had an eastern terminus at US 12 in St. Paul, Minnesota. US 212 passes through the states of Minnesota, South Dakota, Wyoming, and Montana. It goes through the cities of Watertown, South Dakota and Billings, Montana.

== Route description ==
Lengths
| | mi | km |
|---|---|---|
| MT | 321.23 | 516.97 |
| WY | 55.21 | 88.85 |
| SD | 412.45 | 663.77 |
| MN | 161.79 | 260.38 |
| Total | 950.68 | 1,529.97 |

=== Montana and Wyoming ===
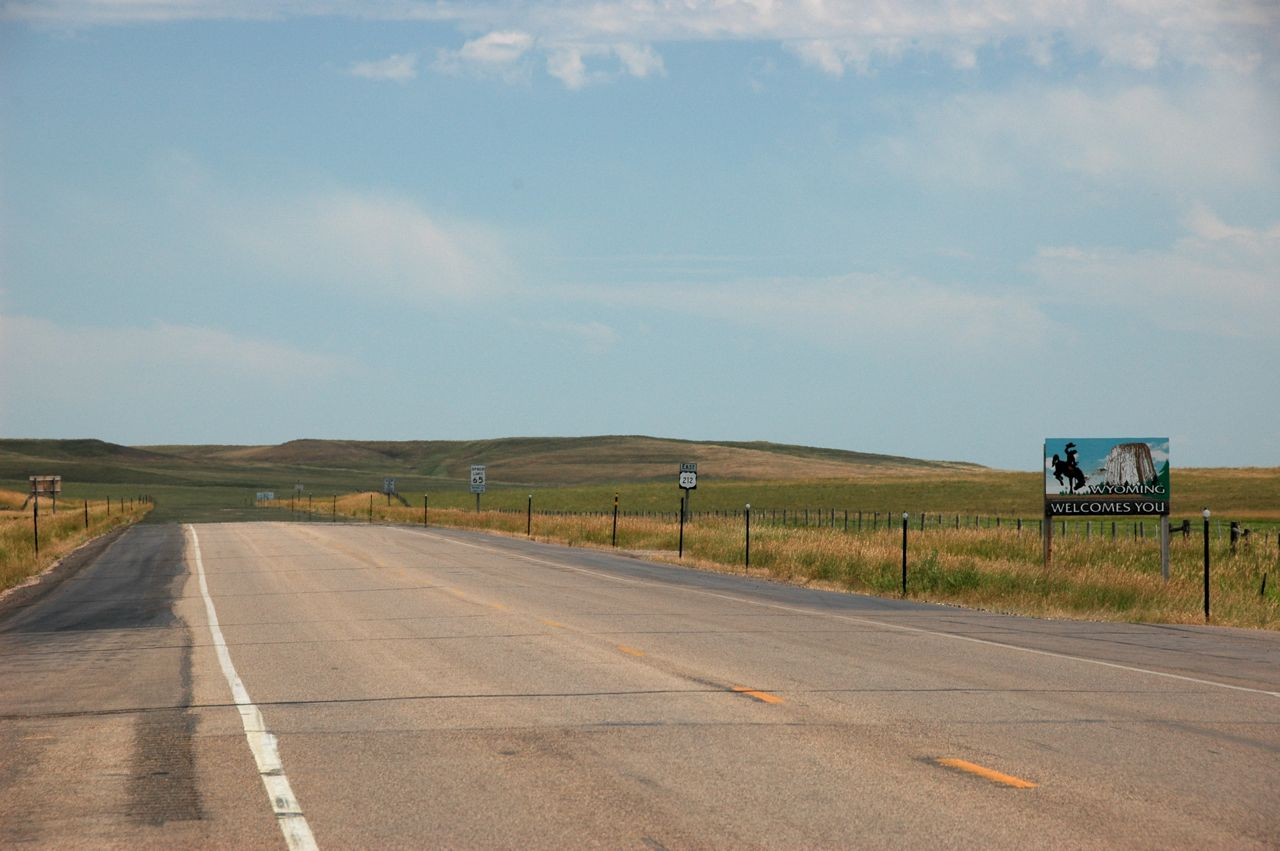
US 212 looking southeast into Wyoming from Montana

While the official western terminus of US 212 is at the Northeast Entrance of Yellowstone National Park near the Wyoming–Montana state line, some commercially produced maps show the highway within the park itself, contiguous with Northeast Entrance Road, starting from its western end at Tower Junction on the Grand Loop. From the park, US 212 heads east through Cooke City, Montana, then crosses the Wyoming state line and re-emerges into Montana approximately 38 miles (61 km) later. The section of US 212 between Cooke City and Red Lodge is known as the Beartooth Highway. Rising to an elevation of 10,974 feet (3,345 m) above sea level at Beartooth Pass, the highway traces the historical route of Civil War General Philip Sheridan over the Beartooth Mountains. In his book Dateline America published in 1979, the late CBS correspondent Charles Kuralt referred to the highway as "the most beautiful drive in America".

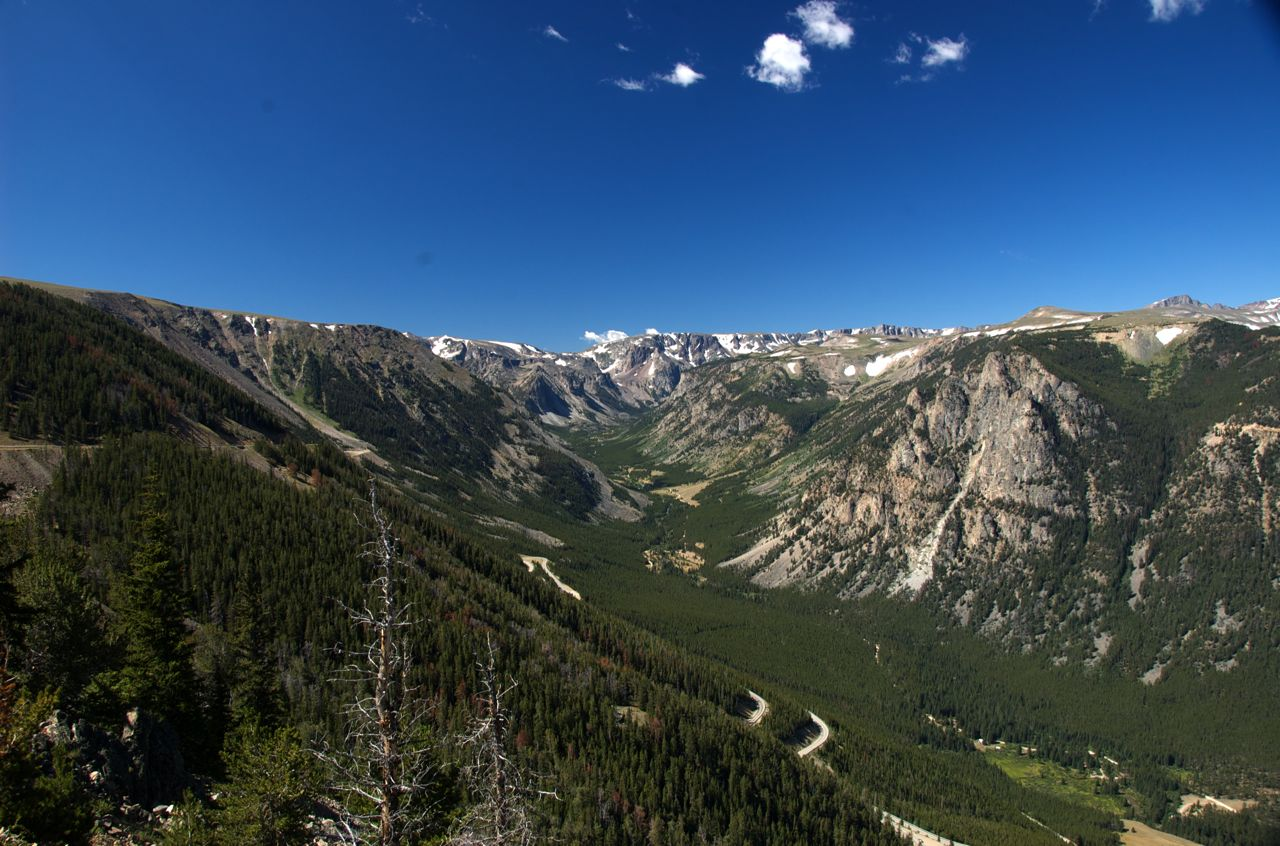
US 212 looking west from Vista Point towards the Beartooth Mountains. Along this series of switchbacks, US 212 climbs over 3,000 feet (910 m) to Beartooth Pass.

Running northeast from the Beartooth Mountains, US 212 joins US 310 before passing into the town of Laurel, Montana. Here US 212 joins Interstate 90 (I-90) eastbound, while US 310 ends. Together, US 212 and I-90 run east through Billings to the town of Crow Agency between mile markers 434 and 510, a distance of 76 miles (122 km).

Within the Crow Indian Reservation, US 212 leaves I-90 and runs east and southeast through the high plains of Montana. It is the main east–west road through the Northern Cheyenne Indian Reservation. Southeast of Alzada, US 212 recrosses the Wyoming state line; after about 20.3 miles (32.7 km), US 212 enters South Dakota. For the entire length of US 212 in Montana between I-90 and the Wyoming state line, it is also known as the Warrior Trail Highway.

=== South Dakota ===
US 212 enters South Dakota near the junction of the Montana, Wyoming and South Dakota state lines, and continues southeast to Belle Fourche. Here it intersects US 85, and then continues eastward, skirting the southern end of the Belle Fourche Reservoir.

It continues east, passing the town of Nisland, until connecting with South Dakota Highway 79 (SD 79) south of Newell. It runs north into Newell, then turns generally east again, passing through the town of Faith and entering the Cheyenne River Indian Reservation. US 212 then passes through Dupree and North Eagle Butte, finally crossing the Missouri River.

Continuing east, it then intersects (and is co-signed briefly) with US 83 near Gettysburg and then continues eastward, passing through Gettysburg, Seneca, and Faulkton. It intersects with SD 45, where it is cosigned for a brief southern leg, before turning eastward again and passing through Rockham, Zell and Redfield, where it intersects with US 281.

Continuing east, US 212 passes through Clark, before entering Watertown, following 9th Avenue SW. Just east of Watertown, it intersects with I-29 and continues east of the Minnesota state line.

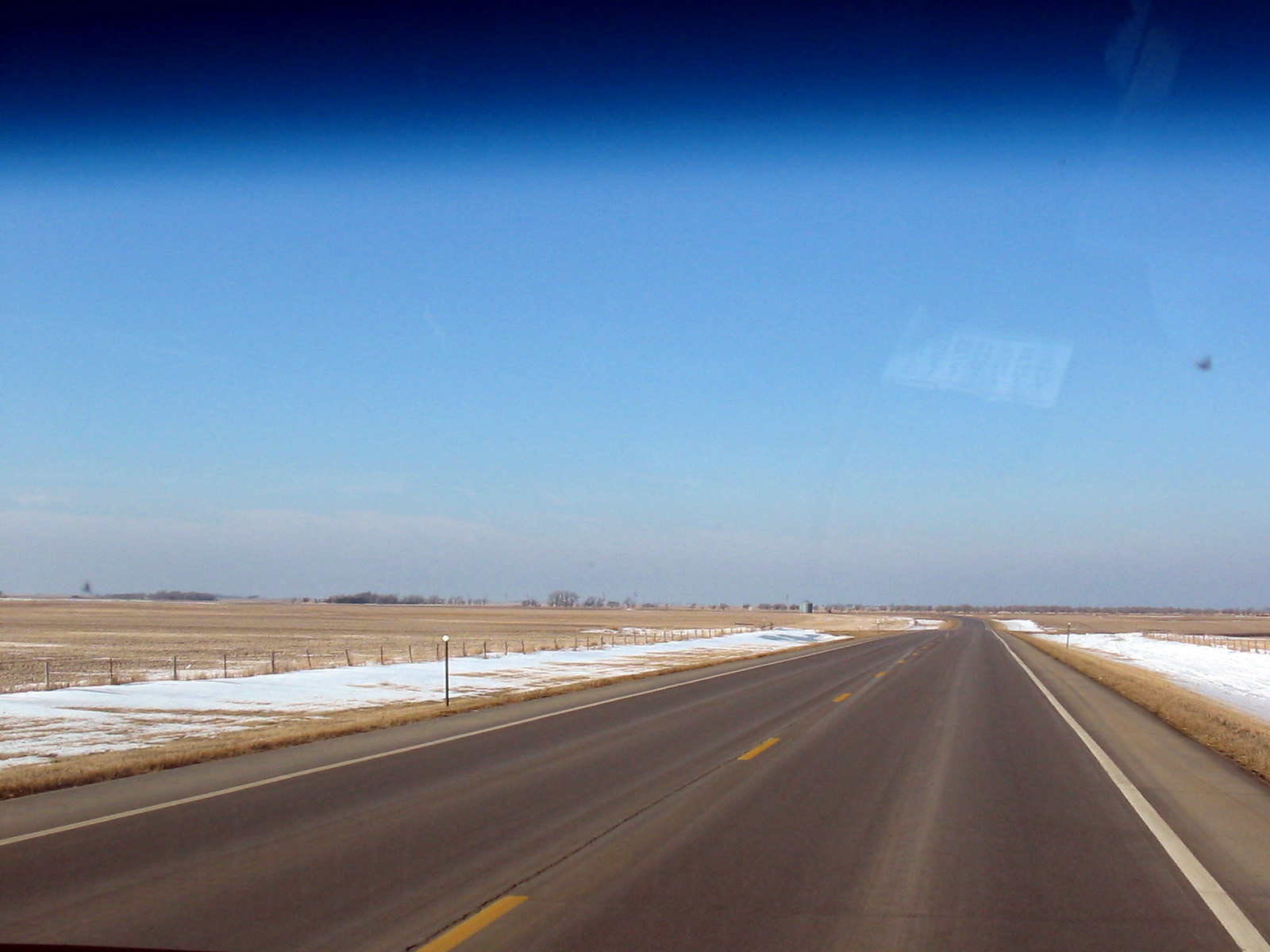
US 212 near Carpenter, South Dakota

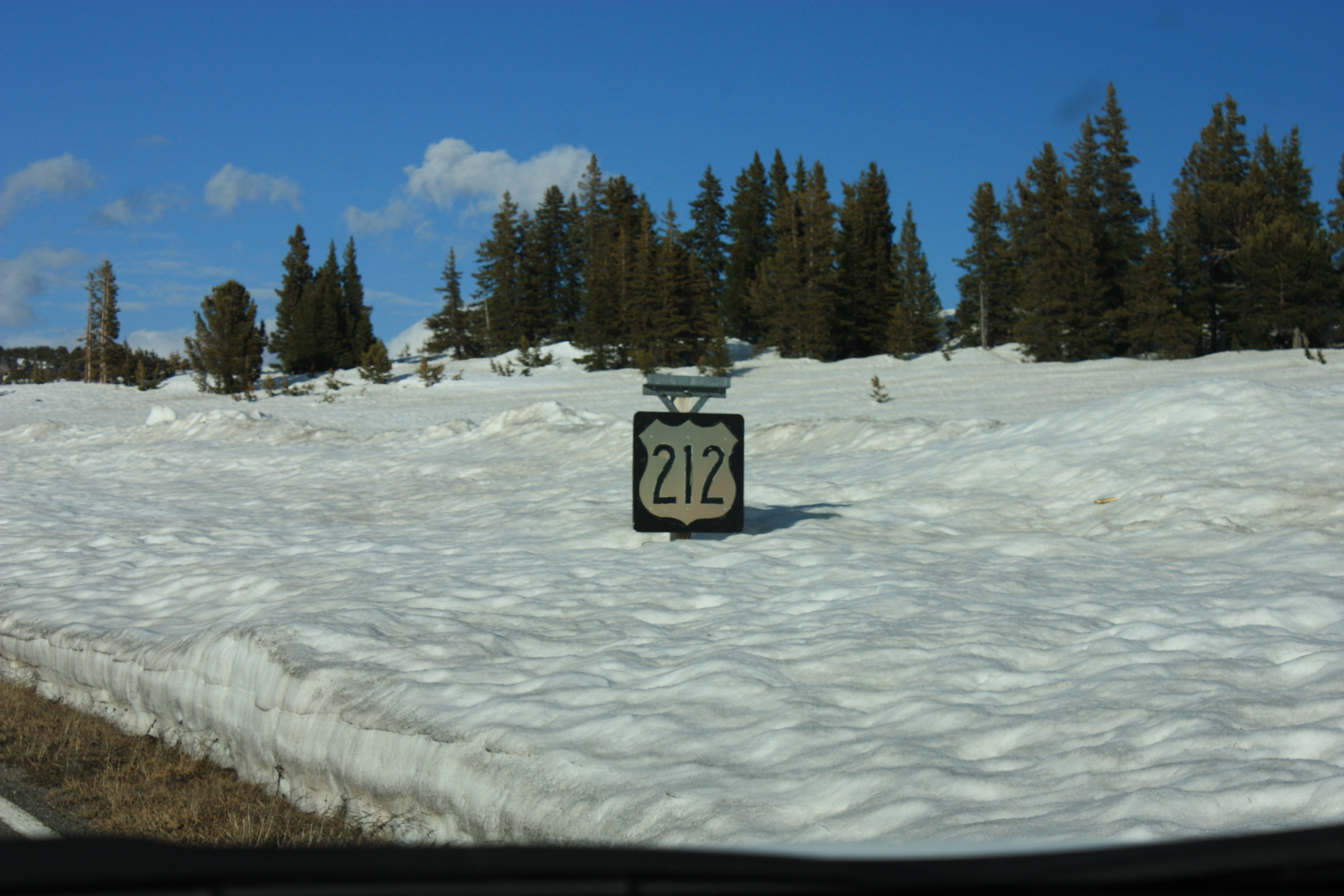
US 212 sign nearly buried in snow during late May 2009 in Wyoming

Legally, the South Dakota section of US 212 is defined at South Dakota Codified Laws § 31-4-206.

=== Minnesota ===
The 160 miles (260 km) of US 212 in Minnesota are officially designated Minnesota Veterans Memorial Highway. Yellowstone Trail is the original name designation for this same stretch of US 212 from the auto trail days. Yellowstone Trail was one of the first designated names written into law in the state.

The route in Minnesota connects the cities of Montevideo, Granite Falls, Olivia, Glencoe, Norwood Young America, and the southwest suburbs of Minneapolis.

Legally, the Minnesota section of US 212 is defined as Routes 155, 12, 187, and 260 in Minnesota Statutes §§ 161.114(2) and 161.115(86), (118), and (191).

== Major intersections ==
Montana (western segment)
Northeast Entrance Road at the northeast entrance to Yellowstone National Park, west of Silver Gate
Wyoming
No major intersections
Montana (eastern segment)
US 310 north-northwest of Edgar. The highways travel concurrently to Laurel.
I-90 / US 310 in Laurel. I-90/US 212 travels concurrently to Crow Agency.
US 87 in Lockwood. The highways travel concurrently to Crow Agency.
I-94 in Lockwood
South Dakota
US 85 in Belle Fourche
US 83 west of Gettysburg. The highways travel concurrently for approximately 0.9 miles (1.4 km).
US 281 in Redfield. The highways travel concurrently through Redfield.
US 81 in Watertown
I-29 in Watertown
Minnesota
US 75 south of Madison
US 59 west-southwest of Montevideo. The highways travel concurrently to Montevideo.
US 71 in Olivia. The highways travel concurrently through Olivia.
I-494 in Eden Prairie
US 169 in Eden Prairie
