= Beartooth Highway =

Scenic road in Montana and Wyoming, United States

Beartooth Highway
- Beartooth Highway highlighted in red

Route information
- Maintained by National Park Service and Montana Department of Transportation
- Length: 68.291 mi (109.904 km)
- Existed: June 4, 1936; 90 years ago–present
- Component highways: US 212

Major junctions
- West end: US 212 at the Northeast Entrance Station of Yellowstone National Park
- WYO 296 near Beartooth Lake
- East end: US 212 / MT 78 in Red Lodge

Location
- Country: United States
- State: Montana

Highway system
- Scenic Byways; National; National Forest; BLM; NPS; Montana Highway System; Interstate; US; State; Secondary
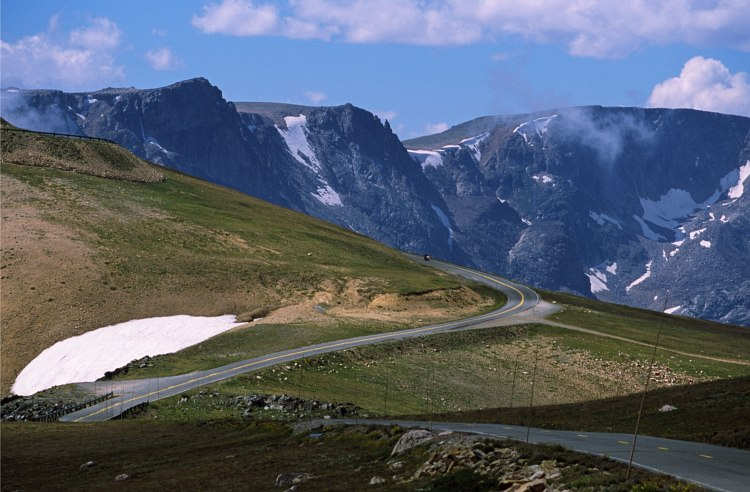
- Approaching Beartooth Pass from the east

- Location within the United States Location within Wyoming
- Elevation: 10,947 ft (3,337 m)
- Traversed by: US 212

Location
- Location: Wyoming, United States
- Range: Beartooth Mountains
- Coordinates: 44°58.1′N 109°27.9′W

The Beartooth Highway is an All-American Road in the western United States on a section of U.S. Route 212 in Montana and Wyoming between Red Lodge and the Northeast entrance of Yellowstone National Park. It crests at Beartooth Pass in Wyoming at 10,947 feet (3,337 m) above sea level, and was called "the most beautiful drive in America," by late CBS News correspondent Charles Kuralt. Because of heavy snowfall at the top, the pass is usually open for about five months per year, from mid-May to mid-October, weather conditions permitting.

== Route description ==
The Beartooth Highway is the section of U.S. Route 212 between Red Lodge and Cooke City, Montana. It traces a series of steep zigzags and switchbacks, along the Montana–Wyoming border (45th parallel) to the 10,947-foot-high (3,337 m) Beartooth Pass in Wyoming. The approximate elevation rise is from 5,200 ft (1,580 m) to 10,947 ft (3,337 m) in twelve miles (19 km) in the most daring and picturesque landscapes.

When driving east to west, the highest parts of the Beartooth Highway level off into a wide plateau near the top of the pass, then descend to the junction with Wyoming Highway 296 (Chief Joseph Scenic Byway), then further west Cooke City (MT), then further west the northeast entrance into Yellowstone National Park. On the way one passes numerous lakes typical of the Absaroka–Beartooth Wilderness which borders the highway along much of its route.

The highway officially opened June 14, 1936.

At this elevation and latitude, snowstorms can occur even in the middle of the summer, and the pass is also known for strong winds and severe thunderstorms. Drivers should plan on a driving time of at least two hours for the 69-mile (111 km) trip from Red Lodge to Cooke City, and it is advised to check with the Red Lodge Chamber of Commerce or the Beartooth Ranger District beforehand in case of road closures. Montana Traveler Information and Wyoming Travel Information Service both provide online information on Beartooth Highway travel conditions for their respective portions of the highway. Altitude sickness is also a risk for susceptible individuals going to this altitude with such a rapid increase in elevation.

The Beartooth Highway passes through portions of Custer, Shoshone, and Gallatin national forests, and near the Absaroka–Beartooth Wilderness.

Despite this, and the U.S. highway number (212), and also connecting to state highway 296 (Chief Joseph Scenic Byway in WY), it is not maintained by the Wyoming Department of Transportation or even the U.S. Forest Service, with WYDOT stating it does not meet standards for Wyoming state highways. It is instead maintained by the National Park Service, despite not being part of the park (like the Foothills Parkway or Skyline Drive) or being its own unit (like the Blue Ridge Parkway and Natchez Trace Parkway). The Montana Department of Transportation does maintain its portions in Custer and Gallatin national forests at the east and west ends of the highway, respectively.

Neither MDT nor NPS perform snow removal except for once in the spring, typically in May, but sometimes not until June if there has been heavy snowfall. Once the road opens, Beartooth Basin Ski Area opens near the state line at Beartooth Pass, for a short summer-only season that lasts until July. The entire Beartooth Pass, as a general rule, opens to the public on Memorial Day Weekend, and closes around Columbus Day (mid-October). The actual date of closure each year is weather-dependent, and can be as early as September depending on conditions.

== History ==
In August 1872, the pass was crossed by Civil War General Philip Sheridan and 120 men returning from an inspection tour of Yellowstone National Park. Rather than take the long detour down the Clarks Fork Yellowstone River to return to Billings, Sheridan took the advice of an old hunter named Shuki Greer, who claimed intimate knowledge of the Beartooth Mountains. When the road was opened in 1936, it essentially followed Sheridan's route over the pass.

=== 2005 closure ===
During the spring of 2005, several large mudslides and rockslides on May 19–20 damaged or destroyed the Montana side of the Beartooth Highway in a dozen places between mile markers 39 and 51. The road was closed for reconstruction, and a $20.4 million construction contract issued which stipulated an October 2005 completion date. Construction was completed ahead of schedule; however, the highway did not reopen for a year. An estimated 100,000 cubic yards (76,500 m^{3}) of rock was removed from a 0.5-mile-long (0.8 km) section of the highway near the top of the switchbacks, and construction crews drilled down to solid bedrock to create new supports for the road.

== Major intersections ==
State	County	Location	mi	km	Destinations	Notes
Montana	Park	Yellowstone National Park	0.000	0.000	US 212 begins / Northeast Entrance Road	Continuation into Yellowstone National Park; US 212 / Beartooth Highway western terminus
Montana	Park	Yellowstone National Park	0.000	0.000	Yellowstone National Park boundary (Northeast Entrance); fees required	
Montana	Park	Silver Gate	0.658	1.059		
Montana	Park	Cooke City	3.930	6.325	Winter closure gate	
Montana	Park	Cooke City	Beartooth Highway (US 212) closed mid-October – Memorial Day weekend			
Montana	Park		5.600	9.012	Colter Pass – elevation 8,048 ft (2,453 m)	
Montana–Wyoming state line			8.340	13.422		
Wyoming	Park		12.557	20.209	Winter closure gate	
Wyoming	Park		12.557	20.209	Pilot Creek Parking Lot	Section between Pilot Creek Parking Lot and WYO 296 open year-round
Wyoming	Park		17.357	27.933	Chief Joseph Scenic Byway (WYO 296 east)	Section between Pilot Creek Parking Lot and WYO 296 open year-round
Wyoming	Park		17.357	27.933	Winter closure gate	
Wyoming	Park		36.900	59.385	Beartooth Pass – elevation 10,974 ft (3,345 m)	
Wyoming–Montana state line			43.104	69.369		
Montana	Carbon		55.709	89.655	Winter closure gate	
Montana	Carbon	Red Lodge	66.799	107.503	S-308 east – Belfry	
Montana	Carbon	Red Lodge	68.291	109.904	MT 78 north (Third Street) – Absarokee, Columbus US 212 east – Billings	Roundabout; Beartooth Highway eastern terminus
1.000 mi = 1.609 km; 1.000 km = 0.621 mi: Closed/former; Concurrency terminus; Tolled; Route transition

== Gallery ==
Beartooth Highway
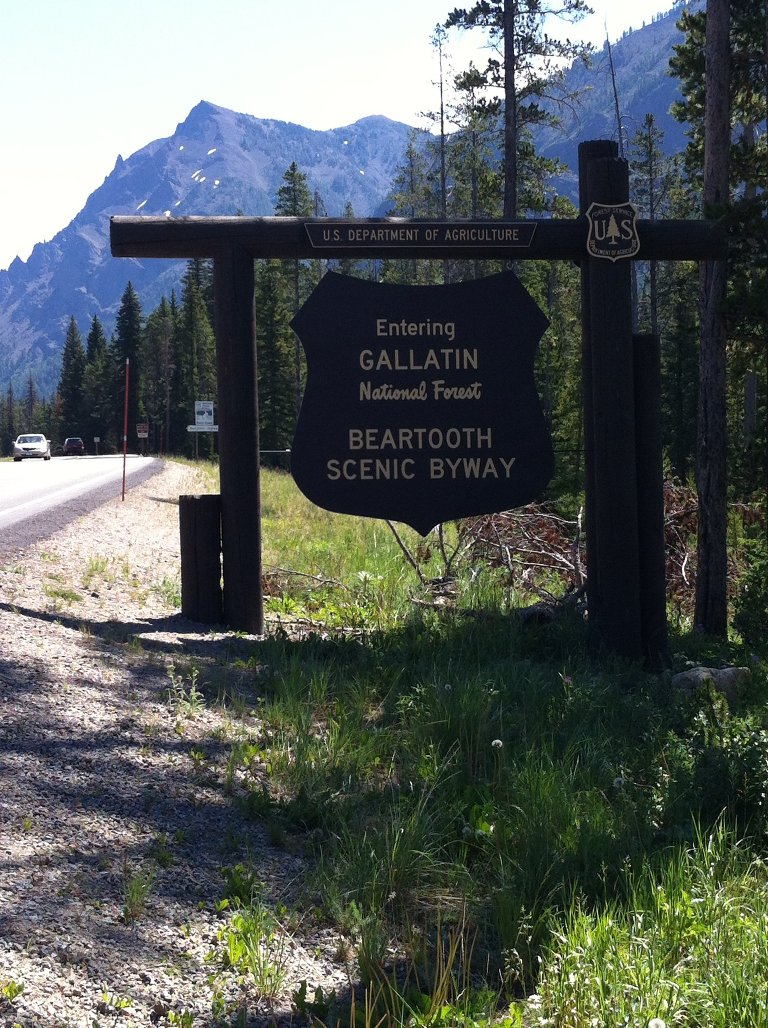
The sign marking the beginning of Beartooth Highway at the exit to Yellowstone National Park

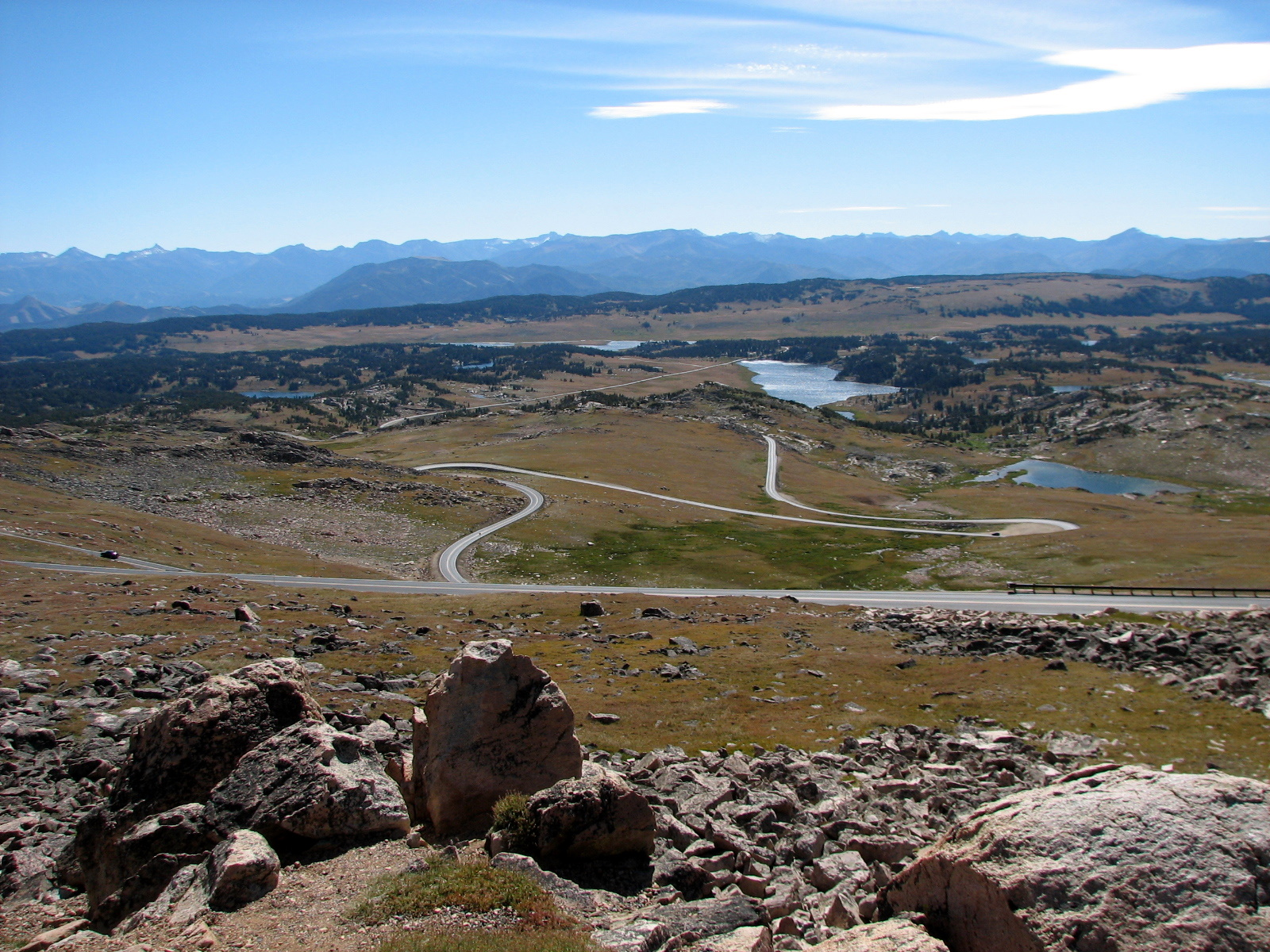
Beartooth Highway weaving its way through the Beartooth Mountains

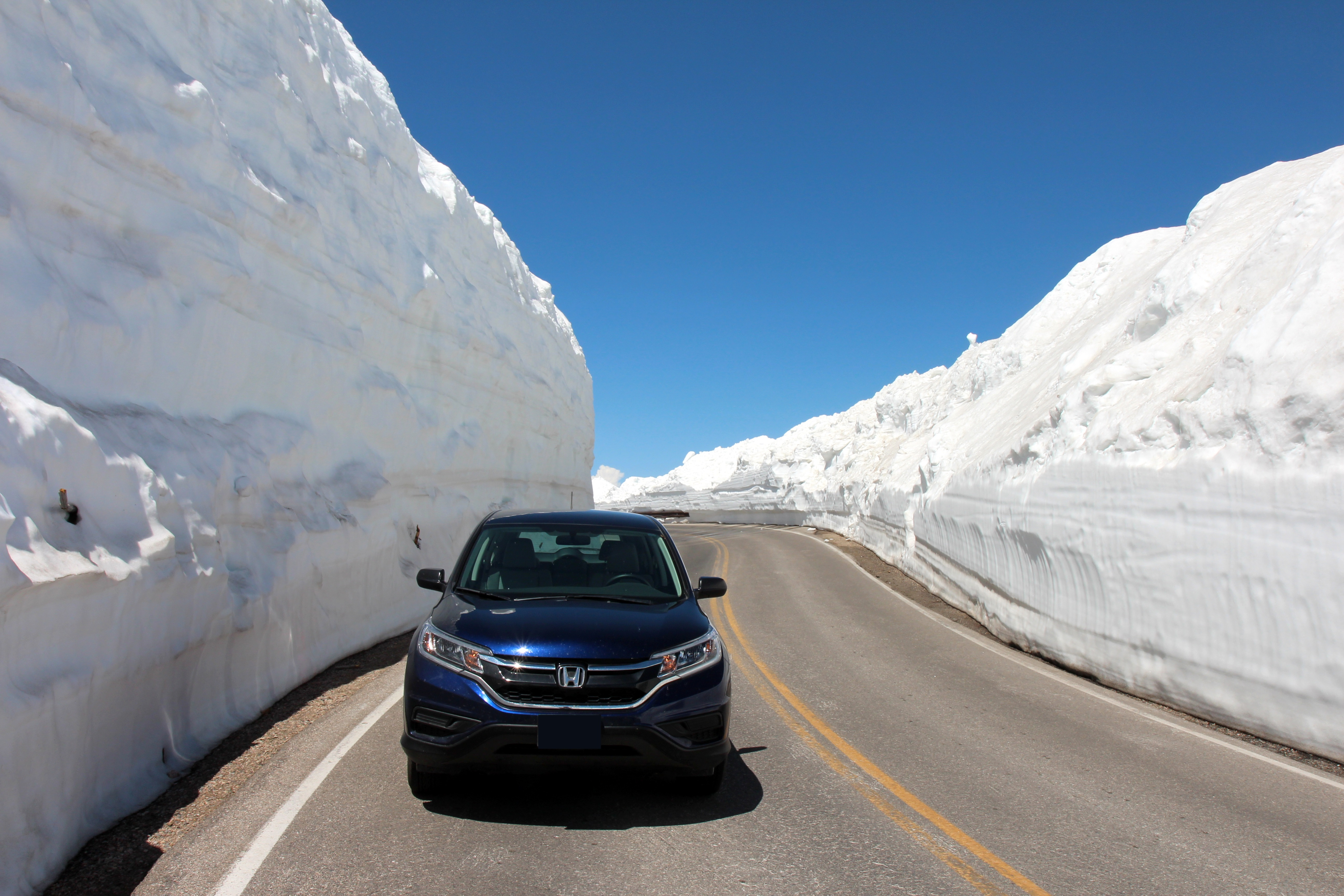
The Beartooth Highway after the snow is plowed in the spring.

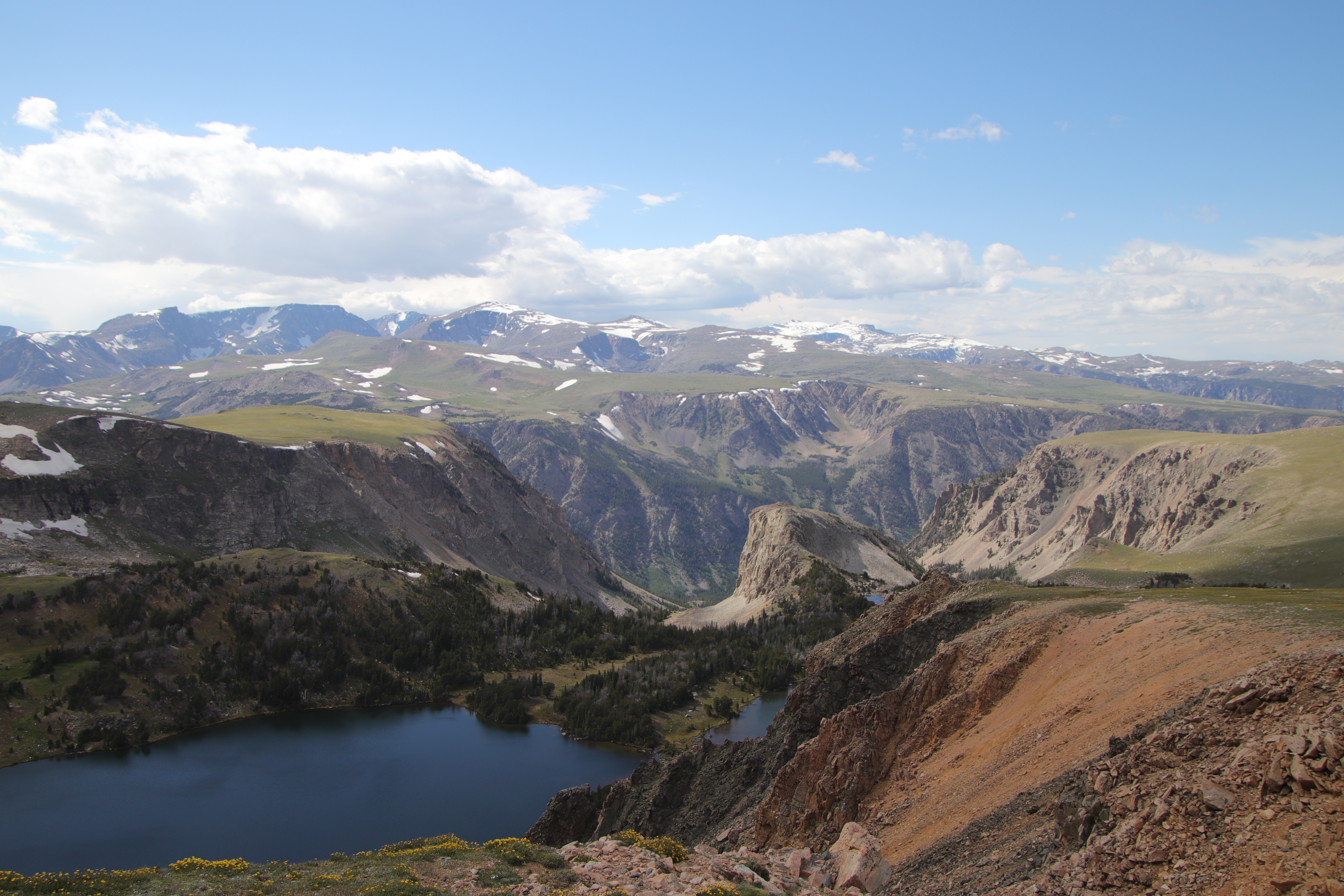
A summertime view from the Beartooth Highway.
