= Silver Gate, Montana =

- Census-designated place
- Location within Montana Location within the United States
- Coordinates: 45°01′19″N 109°59′22″W
- Country: United States
- State: Montana
- County: Park

Area
  - Total: 4.36 sq mi (11.30 km^{2})
  - Land: 4.36 sq mi (11.30 km^{2})
  - Water: 0 sq mi (0.00 km^{2})
- Elevation: 8,573 ft (2,613 m)

Population (2020)
  - Total: 19
  - Density: 4.4/sq mi (1.68/km^{2})
- Time zone: UTC-7 (Mountain (MST))
  - Summer (DST): UTC-6 (MDT)
- ZIP Code: 59081
- Area code: 406
- FIPS code: 30-68425
- GNIS feature ID: 2583847

Silver Gate is an unincorporated community and census-designated place (CDP) in Park County, Montana, United States. As of the 2020 census, Silver Gate had a population of 19. Prior to 2010, it was part of the Cooke City-Silver Gate CDP.

The community sits northeast of Yellowstone National Park on the Beartooth Highway (U.S. Route 212). It is the closest community to the park's Northeast Entrance Station.

== Geography ==
Silver Gate is in the southeast part of Park County, bordered to the south by the North Absaroka Wilderness within Shoshone National Forest in the state of Wyoming, to the west by Yellowstone National Park, and to the east by Cooke City. The two towns sit in the valley of Soda Butte Creek, which flows southwest into Wyoming to join the Lamar River within Yellowstone Park. The valley is part of the Yellowstone River watershed.

== Climate ==
Climate data for Silver Gate, Montana, 1991–2020 normals, precipitation 1991–2020 (Cooke City)
Month	Jan	Feb	Mar	Apr	May	Jun	Jul	Aug	Sep	Oct	Nov	Dec	Year
Mean daily maximum °F (°C)	26.7 (−2.9)	30.2 (−1.0)	38.6 (3.7)	44.3 (6.8)	55.3 (12.9)	64.8 (18.2)	73.8 (23.2)	72.8 (22.7)	63.8 (17.7)	49.6 (9.8)	33.0 (0.6)	24.3 (−4.3)	48.1 (9.0)
Daily mean °F (°C)	14.8 (−9.6)	17.7 (−7.9)	25.4 (−3.7)	32.1 (0.1)	42.0 (5.6)	49.7 (9.8)	56.8 (13.8)	54.7 (12.6)	46.9 (8.3)	36.2 (2.3)	22.5 (−5.3)	13.1 (−10.5)	34.3 (1.3)
Mean daily minimum °F (°C)	2.9 (−16.2)	5.1 (−14.9)	12.2 (−11.0)	19.9 (−6.7)	28.6 (−1.9)	34.5 (1.4)	39.8 (4.3)	36.6 (2.6)	30.0 (−1.1)	22.8 (−5.1)	12.0 (−11.1)	1.8 (−16.8)	20.5 (−6.4)
Average precipitation inches (mm)	2.23 (57)	2.04 (52)	1.94 (49)	2.29 (58)	2.85 (72)	3.16 (80)	1.97 (50)	1.82 (46)	1.74 (44)	2.23 (57)	2.17 (55)	2.13 (54)	26.57 (674)
Average snowfall inches (cm)	38.8 (99)	29.7 (75)	31.0 (79)	22.4 (57)	9.0 (23)	3.4 (8.6)	0.0 (0.0)	0.0 (0.0)	1.0 (2.5)	13.4 (34)	26.5 (67)	37.9 (96)	213.1 (541.1)
Source 1: NOAA
Source 2: National Oceanic and Atmospheric Administration

== Demographics ==
Historical population
Census	Pop.	Note	%±
2020	19		—
U.S. Decennial Census

== Education ==
The CDP is in Cooke City Elementary School District and Gardiner High School District The high school district is a component of Gardiner Public Schools.
