= Cooke City, Montana =

- Census-designated place
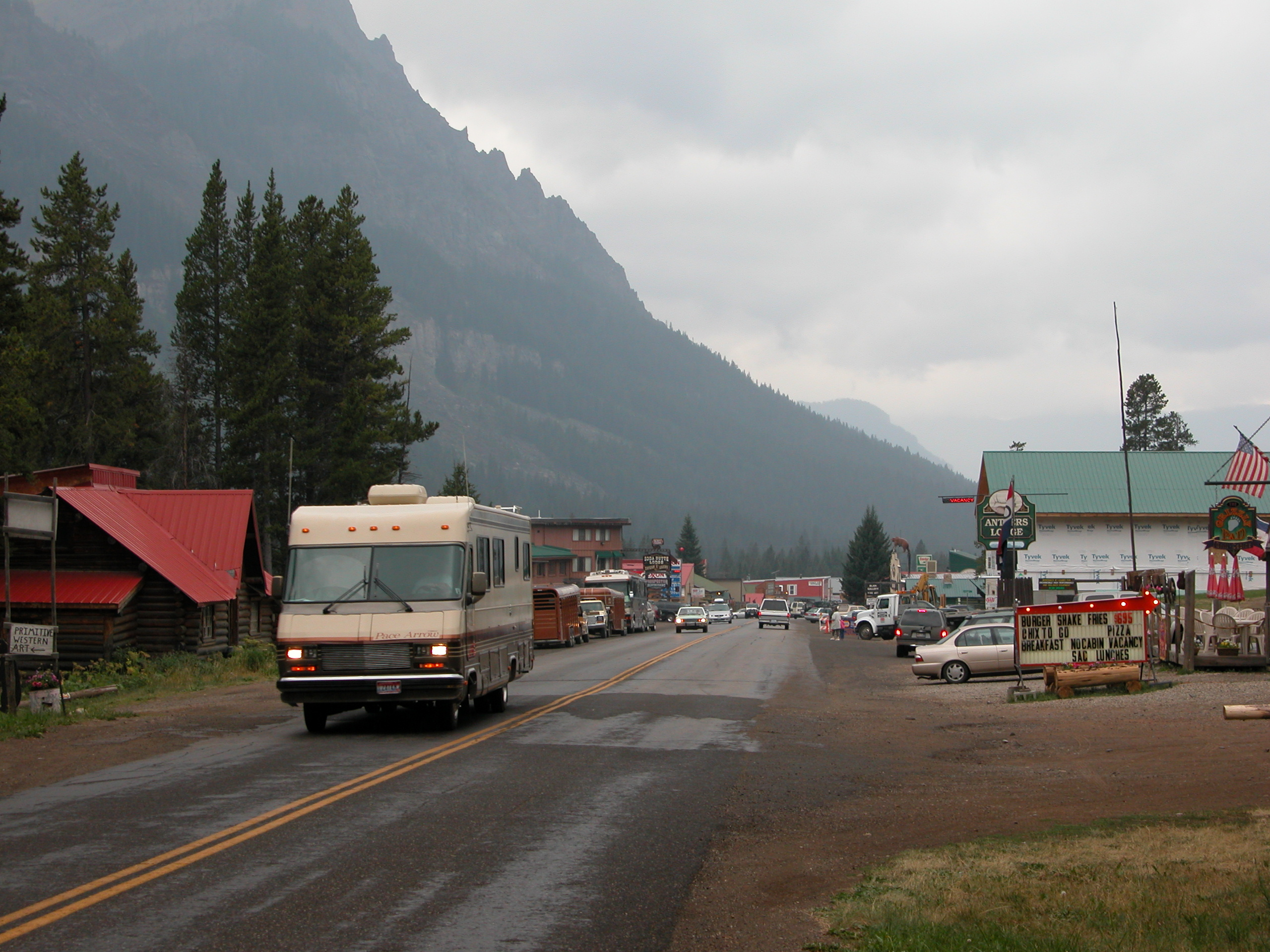
- Entering Cooke City from the east

- Location within Montana Location within the United States
- Coordinates: 45°00′57″N 109°53′24″W
- Country: United States
- State: Montana
- County: Park

Area
  - Total: 9.54 sq mi (24.70 km^{2})
  - Land: 9.54 sq mi (24.70 km^{2})
  - Water: 0 sq mi (0.00 km^{2})
- Elevation: 8,127 ft (2,477 m)

Population (2020)
  - Total: 77
  - Density: 8.1/sq mi (3.12/km^{2})
- Time zone: UTC-7 (Mountain (MST))
  - Summer (DST): UTC-6 (MDT)
- ZIP Code: 59020
- Area code: 406
- FIPS code: 30-17350
- GNIS feature ID: 2583800

Cooke City is an unincorporated community and census-designated place (CDP) in Park County, Montana, United States. As of the 2020 census, it had a population of 77. Prior to 2010, it was part of the Cooke City-Silver Gate CDP.

The community sits northeast of Yellowstone National Park on the Beartooth Highway, which leads east to Red Lodge, Montana, on a scenic route climbing to 10,947 feet (3,337 m) in elevation through the Beartooth Mountains and across the Beartooth Plateau. The town's chief industry is tourism, which during the winter includes skiing and snowmobiling.

It is named for Jay Cooke, financier of the Northern Pacific Railroad.

== Geography ==
Cooke City is near the southeast corner of Park County, bordered to the south by the North Absaroka Wilderness within Shoshone National Forest in the state of Wyoming, and to the west by the community of Silver Gate, Montana. The two towns sit in the valley of Soda Butte Creek, which flows southwest into Wyoming to join the Lamar River in Yellowstone National Park. The valley is part of the Yellowstone River watershed.

U.S. Route 212, the Beartooth Highway, passes through the center of Cooke City, leading southwest into Yellowstone National Park, and east over 8,040-foot (2,450 m) Colter Pass in the eastern part of the CDP to continue southeast back into Wyoming in the valley of the Clarks Fork Yellowstone River and thence into the Beartooth Mountains.

=== Climate ===
Cooke City has a subarctic climate (Dfc) or subalpine climate due to its high elevation at 7,580 feet (2,310 m), with only two months averaging above 50 °F (10 °C). Summers consist of mild to warm days with crisp, cool mornings, and winters are long and very cold, with many nights falling below zero. Snowfall is abundant, with most of it falling between the months of October to May, though snow does occasionally fall in the months of June and September. Cooke City is listed as the snowiest community in Montana.

Climate data for Cooke City, Montana, 1991–2020 normals, extremes 1946–2013 (Note: Records from January 1946 to October 1967 were at Yellowstone National Park's Northeast Entrance. From November 1967 to 2013 records were at a station approximately 2 miles (3.2 km) west of the city.)
Month	Jan	Feb	Mar	Apr	May	Jun	Jul	Aug	Sep	Oct	Nov	Dec	Year
Record high °F (°C)	48 (9)	54 (12)	58 (14)	74 (23)	80 (27)	88 (31)	100 (38)	90 (32)	86 (30)	85 (29)	60 (16)	47 (8)	100 (38)
Mean maximum °F (°C)	37.8 (3.2)	44.2 (6.8)	51.4 (10.8)	61.2 (16.2)	71.1 (21.7)	79.9 (26.6)	84.9 (29.4)	82.7 (28.2)	77.1 (25.1)	66.2 (19.0)	48.1 (8.9)	36.3 (2.4)	85.3 (29.6)
Mean daily maximum °F (°C)	24.2 (−4.3)	28.6 (−1.9)	36.9 (2.7)	43.4 (6.3)	53.5 (11.9)	63.9 (17.7)	73.7 (23.2)	71.1 (21.7)	62.0 (16.7)	47.0 (8.3)	30.9 (−0.6)	22.4 (−5.3)	46.5 (8.0)
Daily mean °F (°C)	15.0 (−9.4)	18.0 (−7.8)	25.3 (−3.7)	32.2 (0.1)	40.9 (4.9)	49.2 (9.6)	56.3 (13.5)	54.4 (12.4)	46.6 (8.1)	35.5 (1.9)	22.1 (−5.5)	14.3 (−9.8)	34.2 (1.2)
Mean daily minimum °F (°C)	5.8 (−14.6)	7.4 (−13.7)	13.7 (−10.2)	21.0 (−6.1)	28.4 (−2.0)	34.5 (1.4)	38.9 (3.8)	37.7 (3.2)	31.2 (−0.4)	24.1 (−4.4)	13.3 (−10.4)	6.3 (−14.3)	21.9 (−5.6)
Mean minimum °F (°C)	−23.1 (−30.6)	−24.5 (−31.4)	−13.4 (−25.2)	−0.4 (−18.0)	14.5 (−9.7)	25.6 (−3.6)	30.6 (−0.8)	28.7 (−1.8)	18.3 (−7.6)	5.8 (−14.6)	−10.7 (−23.7)	−22.7 (−30.4)	−32.2 (−35.7)
Record low °F (°C)	−51 (−46)	−47 (−44)	−40 (−40)	−18 (−28)	1 (−17)	16 (−9)	22 (−6)	12 (−11)	3 (−16)	−13 (−25)	−36 (−38)	−50 (−46)	−51 (−46)
Average precipitation inches (mm)	2.23 (57)	2.04 (52)	1.94 (49)	2.29 (58)	2.85 (72)	3.16 (80)	1.97 (50)	1.82 (46)	1.74 (44)	2.23 (57)	2.17 (55)	2.13 (54)	26.57 (674)
Average snowfall inches (cm)	38.8 (99)	29.7 (75)	31.0 (79)	22.4 (57)	9.0 (23)	3.4 (8.6)	0.0 (0.0)	0.0 (0.0)	1.0 (2.5)	13.4 (34)	26.5 (67)	37.9 (96)	213.1 (541.1)
Average precipitation days (≥ 0.01 in)	17.3	13.3	13.1	13.1	14.1	14.5	11.1	10.4	9.5	11.6	13.4	17.2	158.6
Average snowy days (≥ 0.1 in)	17.0	12.6	11.3	9.4	4.0	0.8	0.0	0.0	0.8	6.7	11.8	16.4	90.8
Source 1: XMACIS2 (mean maxima/minima 1981–2010)
Source 2: NOAA

== Demographics ==
Historical population
Census	Pop.	Note	%±
2020	77		—
U.S. Decennial Census

== Education ==
The CDP is in Cooke City Elementary School District and Gardiner High School District The high school district is a component of Gardiner Public Schools.

== Gallery ==
Images

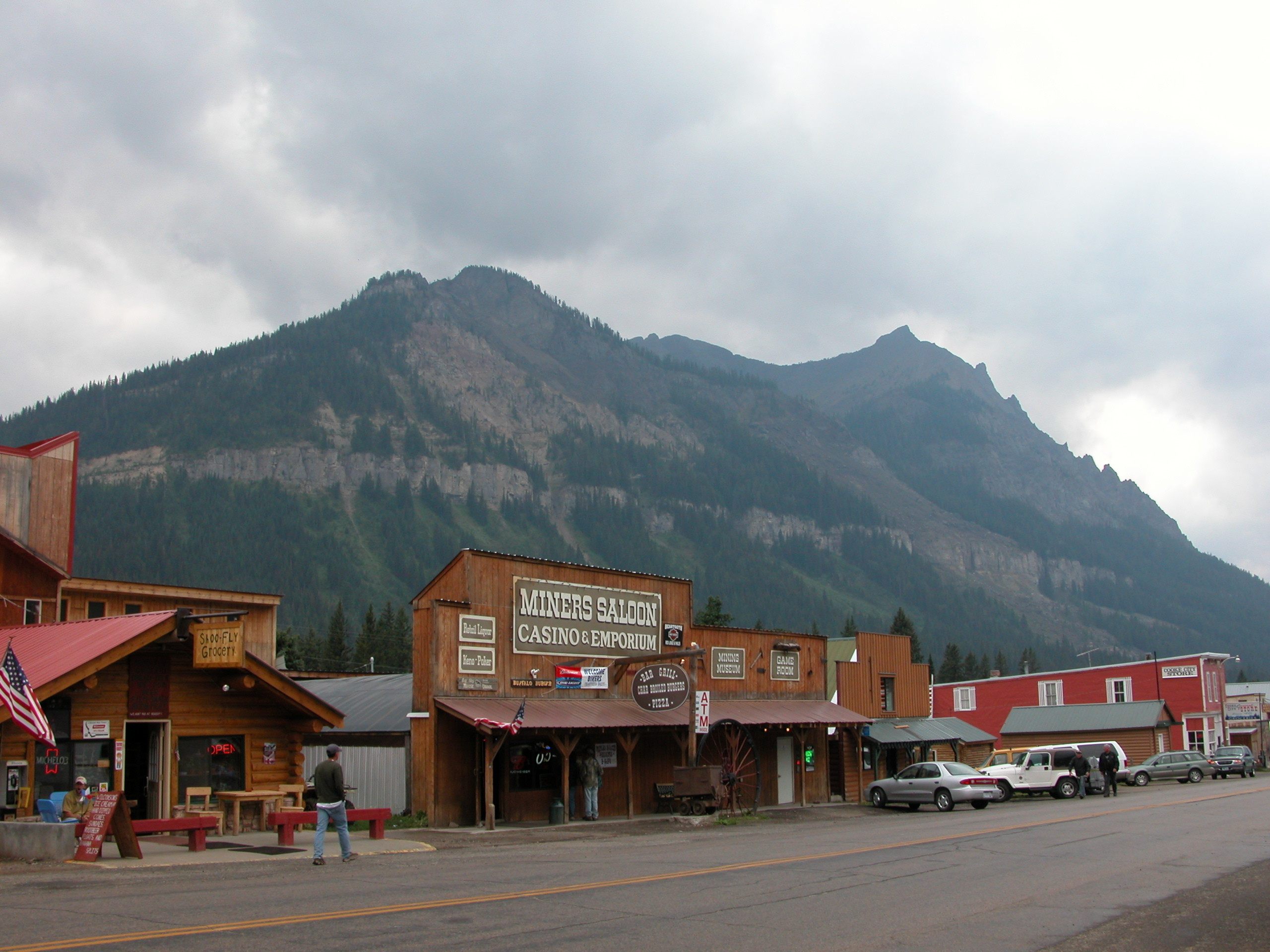
Miners Saloon and Republic Mountain, 2003

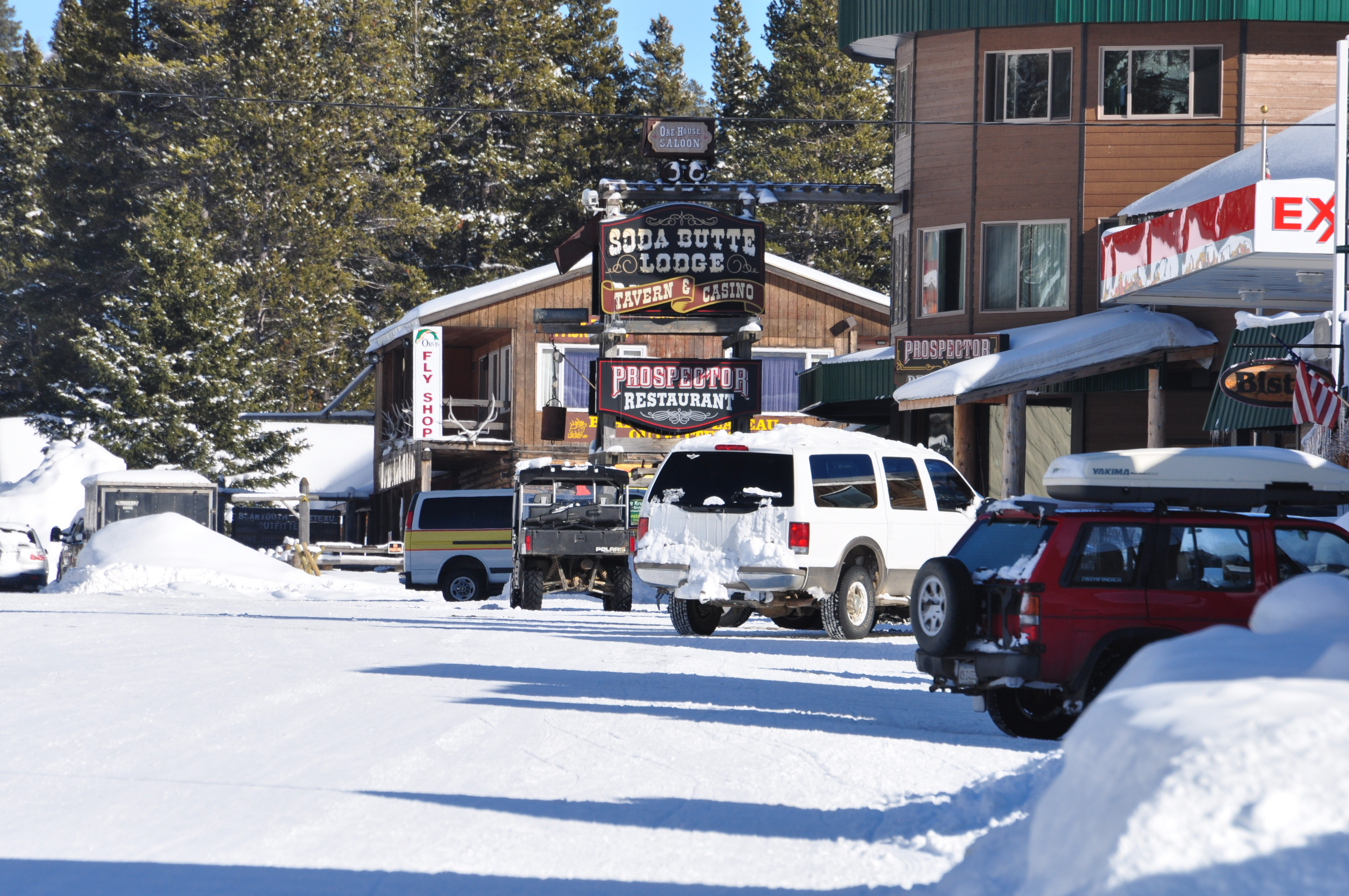
Looking east, January 2010
