= Northeast Entrance Station =

- U.S. National Register of Historic Places
- U.S. National Historic Landmark
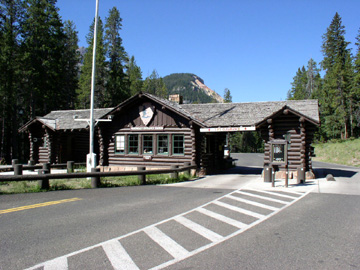

- Location within Montana Location within the United States
- Location: US 212 – Yellowstone National Park, Montana
- Coordinates: 45°0′17″N 110°0′33″W
- Built: 1935
- Architect: NPS Branch of Plans & Design; George Larkin
- NRHP reference No.: 87001435

Significant dates
- Added to NRHP: May 28, 1987
- Designated NHL: May 28, 1987

The Northeast Entrance Station to Yellowstone National Park, in Park County, Montana, is a rustic log building designed by the National Park Service Branch of Plans and Design under the direction of Thomas Chalmers Vint and built in 1935. The entrance station straddles U.S. Route 212 (US 212) west of Silver Gate. A combined ranger station and residence is located nearby. All buildings were constructed by George Larkin of Gardiner, Montana.

== Description ==
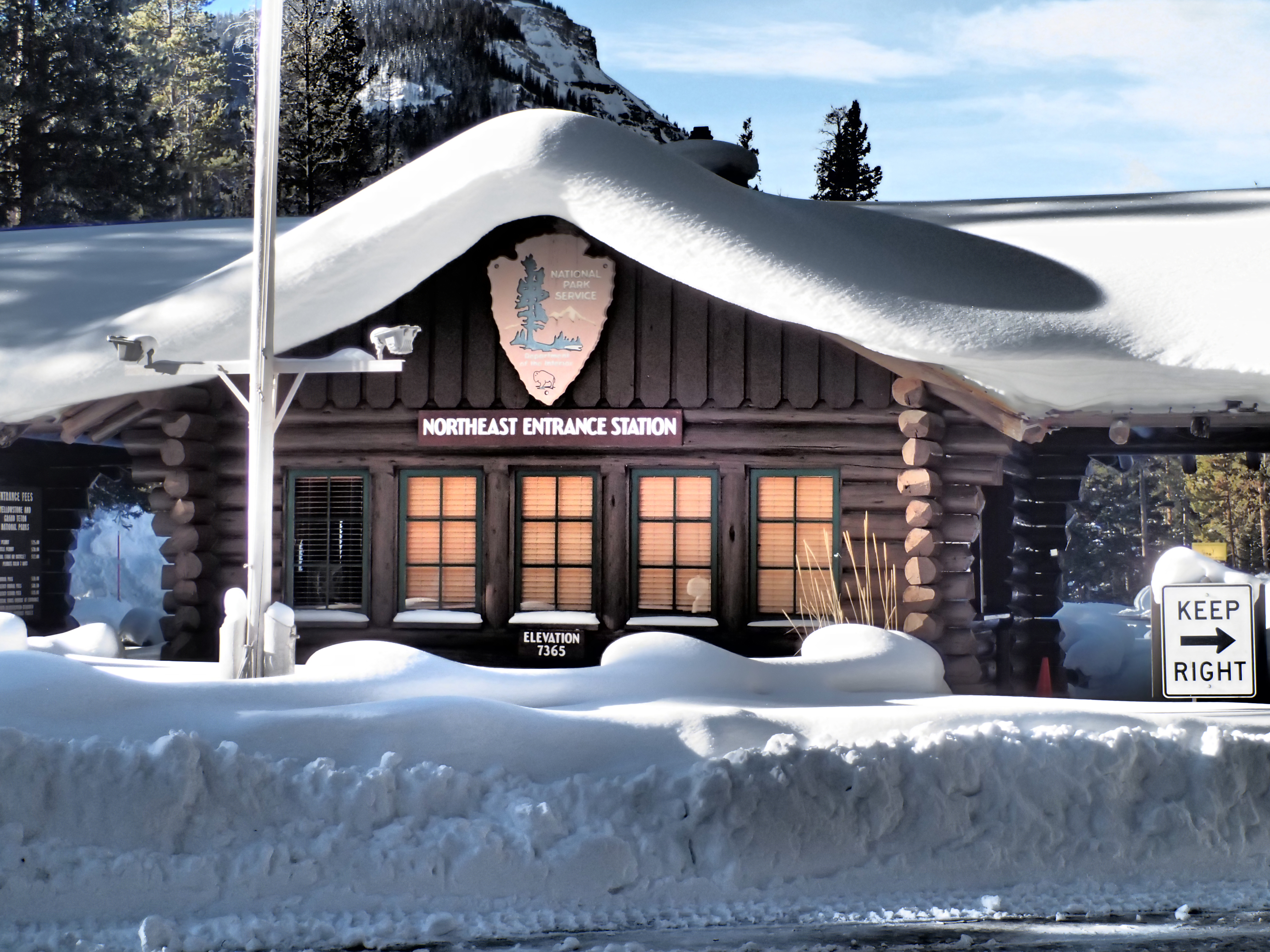
January 2014

The Northeast Entrance Station spans the center of the road into the park from Silver Gate. A central block housing the office and two checking windows is flanked by smaller blocks, each housing a checking window and joined to the main block by a long gabled roof that spans the ensemble. Each block is marked by a cross gable proportional to the block's size. The walls are lodgepole pine logs cut within the park with saddle-jointed corner, randomly beveled. Log poles support the shingled roof. The entrance station rests on a local stone foundation. A stone chimney for the heating stove projects above the central block. Earth floors have been replaced with concrete slabs.

The ranger residence is a matching log building, rectangular in plan with a small extension housing an office. The residence is one story with seven rooms. Unusually for its time it was insulated during construction to try to prevent ice from building up on the roof.

== Influence ==
The Northeast Entrance Station was featured in a planbook published by the National Park Service as an example of appropriate design for national and state park structures. Park and Recreational Structures was greatly influential in the design of park facilities in North America in the late 1930s, when many parks were being developed as job-creation projects. The design of the entrance station may itself have been influenced by the 1932 decision of the small community of Silver Gate, just beyond the entrance station, to build entirely in log construction.

== Historic designation ==
As a pristine example of its type, and being an ambitious one for its time, it was declared a National Historic Landmark in 1987, and was placed on the National Register of Historic Places at the same time.

== See also ==
- List of National Historic Landmarks in Montana
- National Register of Historic Places listings in Park County, Montana
