= Washoe, Montana =

Coordinates: 45°09′50″N 109°12′48″W

Washoe is a settlement in Carbon County, Montana, United States, situated at the foot of the Beartooth Mountains. It is situated on Montana Secondary Highway 308.

== History ==
"In 1903, Fred and Annie Bartels purchased the land from the U. S. Government. Coal mining was a thriving industry in this area. Anaconda Copper Company purchased the land from the Bartels in 1906."

"In 1907, on the head waters of the Bearcreek stream, the Anaconda Copper Mining Co. and its subsidiary, the Washoe Coal Co. developed the company coal mining town. Large daily freight shipments of 1,200 tons of coal went to the Anaconda smelters," via the Northern Pacific Railroad. "With the formation of the Montana Power Co. in 1912, soon there was less use of coal and the Washoe Mine closed."

The town was completely devastated by the Smith Mine disaster of Feb. 27, 1943, considered to be the worst coal mining disaster in Montana history. The traumatic mining accident coupled with the withdrawal of the railroad sealed the demise of the town.

Today Washoe is a ghost town with many buildings still standing intact. The town can be easily visited by taking the Washoe turnoff on State Highway 93. Washoe is located on Highway 308 between Belfry and Red Lodge. The population, which was as high as 3,000, is now only a "handful of people."

A post office opened in Washoe on December 2, 1907, with Earle E. Lombard as its first postmaster. It was closed July 31, 1959.
