= List of Montana railroads =

The following railroads operate in the U.S. state of Montana.

== Common freight carriers ==
- BNSF Railway (BNSF)
- Butte, Anaconda and Pacific Railway (BAP)
- Central Montana Rail, Inc. (CM)
- Dakota, Missouri Valley and Western Railroad (DMVW)
- Mission Mountain Railroad (MMT)
- Montana Rail Link (MRL)
- Union Pacific Railroad (UP)
- Yellowstone Valley Railroad (YSVR)

== Private freight carriers ==
- Global Rail Group
- Lincoln County Port Authority (LCPA)
- Montana Limestone Company (MLC)
- Port of Montana (POM)
- Transco

== Passenger carriers ==
- Amtrak (AMTK)

== Defunct railroads ==
Name	Mark	System (Note: This is one or more of the Class I railroads that the railroad became part of, if any.)	From	To	Successor	Notes
Big Blackfoot Railway		MILW	1910	1916	Chicago, Milwaukee and St. Paul Railway	
Big Horn Railroad		CB&Q	1905	1916	Chicago, Burlington and Quincy Railroad	
Big Horn Southern Railroad		CB&Q	1888	1897	Chicago, Burlington and Quincy Railroad	
Billings and Central Montana Railway		NP	1912	1921	Northern Pacific Railway	
Billings and Northern Railroad		GN	1902	1907	Great Northern Railway	
Bozeman Street Railway		MILW	1892	1909	Gallatin Valley Electric Railway	
Burlington Northern Inc.	BN		1970	1981	Burlington Northern Railroad	
Burlington Northern Railroad	BN		1981	1996	Burlington Northern and Santa Fe Railway	
Butte, Anaconda and Pacific Railway	BA&P, BAP		1892	1985	Rarus Railway	
Butte, Wisdom and Pacific Railway			1913	1914	Southern Montana Railway	
Camp Creek Railway		NP	1911	1914	Northern Pacific Railway	
Chicago, Burlington and Quincy Railroad	CB&Q	CB&Q	1894	1970	Burlington Northern Inc.	
Chicago, Burlington and Quincy Railway		CB&Q	1901	1907	N/A	Leased the Chicago, Burlington and Quincy Railroad
Chicago, Milwaukee and Puget Sound Railway		MILW	1909	1912	Chicago, Milwaukee and St. Paul Railway	
Chicago, Milwaukee and St. Paul Railway		MILW	1912	1928	Chicago, Milwaukee, St. Paul and Pacific Railroad	
Chicago, Milwaukee and St. Paul Railway of Montana		MILW	1905	1908	Chicago, Milwaukee and St. Paul Railway of Washington	
Chicago, Milwaukee and St. Paul Railway of Washington		MILW	1908	1909	Chicago, Milwaukee and Puget Sound Railway	
Chicago, Milwaukee, St. Paul and Pacific Railroad	MILW	MILW	1928	1982	Burlington Northern Railroad	
Clearwater Short Line Railway		NP	1898	1914	Northern Pacific Railway	
Coeur d'Alene Railway and Navigation Company		NP	1886	1897	Northern Pacific Railway	
Drummond and Philipsburg Railroad		NP	1887	1888	Northern Pacific and Montana Railroad	
Elliston and Southern Railroad			1896		N/A	
Gallatin Valley Railway		MILW	1910	1918	Chicago, Milwaukee and St. Paul Railway	
Gallatin Valley Electric Railway		MILW	1908	1910	Gallatin Valley Railway	
Gaylord and Ruby Valley Railway		NP	1897	1899	Northern Pacific Railway	
Gilmore and Pittsburgh Railroad		NP	1907	1939	N/A	
Great Falls and Canada Railway		GN	1889	1901	Montana and Great Northern Railway	
Great Falls Terminal Railway		MILW	1912	1914	Chicago, Milwaukee and St. Paul Railway	
Great Falls and Teton County Railway		GN	1912	1914	Great Northern Railway	
Great Northern Railway	GN	GN	1890	1970	Burlington Northern Inc.	
Helena, Boulder Valley and Butte Railroad		NP	1886	1888	Northern Pacific and Montana Railroad	
Helena and Jefferson County Railroad		NP	1883	1898	Northern Pacific Railway	
Helena and Northern Railroad		NP	1886	1888	Northern Pacific and Montana Railroad	
Helena and Red Mountain Railroad		NP	1886	1899	Northern Pacific Railway	
Minneapolis, St. Paul and Sault Ste. Marie Railroad	SOO	CP	1944	1961	Soo Line Railroad	
Minneapolis, St. Paul and Sault Ste. Marie Railway	SOO	CP	1913	1944	Minneapolis, St. Paul and Sault Ste. Marie Railroad	
Missoula and Bitter Root Valley Railroad		NP	1887	1888	Northern Pacific and Montana Railroad	
Missoula and Hamilton Railway		NP	1911	1916	Northern Pacific Railway	
Missouri River Railway		NP	1906	1914	Northern Pacific Railway	
Montana Railroad		MILW	1894	1910	Chicago, Milwaukee and Puget Sound Railway	
Montana Railway		NP	1881	1898	Northern Pacific Railway	
Montana Central Railway		GN	1886	1907	Great Northern Railway	
Montana Eastern Railway		GN	1912	1928	Great Northern Railway	
Montana and Great Northern Railway		GN	1901	1907	Great Northern Railway, St. Paul, Minneapolis and Manitoba Railway	
Montana Southern Railway			1917	1940	N/A	
Montana Southern Railway		NP	1893	1897	Gaylord and Ruby Valley Railway	
Montana Union Railway		NP	1886	1898	Northern Pacific Railway	
Montana Western Railway	MWRR		1986	2003	Burlington Northern and Santa Fe Railway	
Montana Western Railway			1909	1970	Burlington Northern Inc.	
Montana, Wyoming and Southern Railroad	MW&S, MWS		1909	1955	N/A	
Northern Pacific Railroad		NP	1864	1896	Northern Pacific Railway	
Northern Pacific Railway	NP	NP	1896	1970	Burlington Northern Inc.	
Northern Pacific and Montana Railroad		NP	1888	1898	Northern Pacific Railway	
Oregon Short Line Railroad		UP	1897	1987	Union Pacific Railroad	
Oregon Short Line and Utah Northern Railway		UP	1889	1897	Oregon Short Line Railroad	
Rarus Railway	RARW		1985	2007	Butte, Anaconda and Pacific Railway	
Rocky Fork and Cooke City Railway		NP	1886	1898	Northern Pacific Railway	
Rocky Mountain Railroad of Montana		NP	1881	1898	Northern Pacific Railway	
St. Paul, Minneapolis and Manitoba Railway		GN	1879	1907	Great Northern Railway	
Shields River Valley Railway		NP	1908	1914	Northern Pacific Railway	
Soo Line Railroad	SOO	CP	1961			Still exists in Montana as a lessor of the Dakota, Missouri Valley and Western Railroad
Southern Montana Railway			1914	1917	Montana Southern Railway	
Utah and Northern Railway		UP	1878	1889	Oregon Short Line and Utah Northern Railway	
White Sulphur Springs and Yellowstone Park Railway	WSYP	MILW	1910	1980	N/A	
Yellowstone Park Railroad			1905	1909	Montana, Wyoming and Southern Railroad	

Electric

- Amador Railway
- Anaconda Copper Mining Company (Electric Light and Railway Department)
- Bozeman Street Railway
- Butte, Anaconda and Pacific Railway (BA&P, BAP)
- Butte Consolidated Railway
- Butte Electric Railway
- Gallatin Light, Power and Railway Company
- Gallatin Valley Railway
- Gallatin Valley Electric Railway
- Great Falls Street Railway
- Helena Light and Railway Company
- Helena Light and Traction Company

Not completed

- Montana Railway
- North and South Railway
