= Smith Mine Historic District =

Historic district in Montana, United States

- U.S. National Register of Historic Places
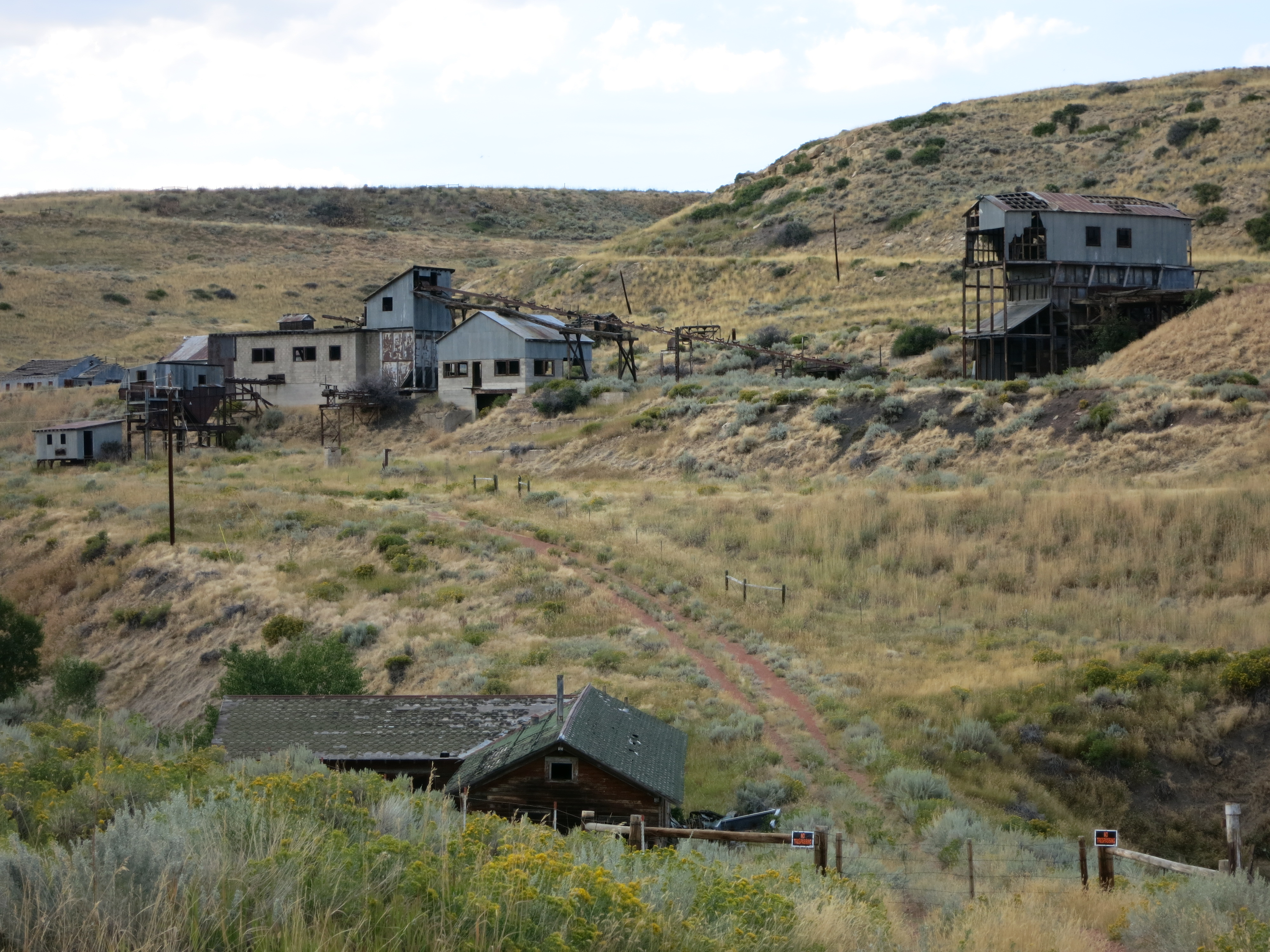
- Site of Smith Mine disaster

- Location within Montana Location within the United States
- Nearest city: Bearcreek, Montana
- Area: 200 acres (81 ha)
- Built: 1906
- Built by: Montana Coal & Iron Co.
- Architectural style: Functional utilitarian
- NRHP reference No.: 09000788
- Added to NRHP: September 30, 2009

The Smith Mine Historic District, in Carbon County, Montana, near Bearcreek, Montana, is a historic district which was listed on the National Register of Historic Places in 2009. The district included 27 contributing buildings and 12 contributing structures on 200 acres (81 ha).

It was the site of the Smith Mine disaster in 1943, which killed 75 men, and is among the 50 most deadly mining incidents ever in the United States.
