= Gary D. Robson =

American author

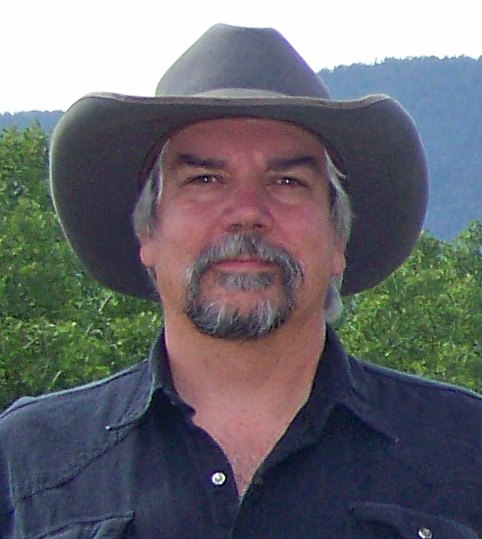
- Robson in 2009
- Born: Gary Douglas Robson; May 11, 1958; Poughkeepsie, New York
- Occupation: Author
- Spouse: Kathryn Robson
- Writing career
- Genres: Nonfiction, Fantasy, and Children's Nature/Science
- Notable works: Who Pooped in the Park?, The Closed Captioning Handbook
- Website: garydrobson.com

Gary D. Robson (May 11, 1958) is an American author from Red Lodge, Montana. He is best known for his children's picture book series entitled Who Pooped in the Park?, which teaches children about animal scat and tracks. The series currently comprises 20 books, mostly set in United States National Parks. The 20th book in the series was released in 2016, covering Central Park in New York City.

Robson is also an expert in closed captioning and subtitling technologies for deaf and hard of hearing people.

== Biography ==
Robson was born in Poughkeepsie, New York, in 1958 and grew up in Colorado, where he graduated from Boulder High School in 1976. He began writing for technical journals in 1984, and wrote a series of computer manuals before writing his first book in 1996 with Richard Sherman (a.k.a. Mr. Modem). He continued to write while working in the electronics industry until 2001, when he and his wife moved to Montana and purchased a bookstore. He was the publisher and editor-in-chief of the monthly alternative newspaper in Red Lodge, The Local Rag.

=== Closed captioning ===
Cheetah International, the company founded by Robson and his wife, began producing software and equipment for closed captioning in 1997, and Robson published articles on the subject for a variety of publications, including the Journal of Court Reporting, Newswaves, and Nuts & Volts. He holds three patents related to closed captioning: U.S. Patent #7,360,234 (2008), U.S. Patent #8,245,252 B2 (2012), and U.S. Patent #8,312,485 (2008). He was presented with the Andrew Saks Engineering Award for "outstanding contributions in improving visual accessibility to information via realtime captioning for deaf and hard-of-hearing Americans" by Telecommunications for the Deaf, Inc. in 1997.

He wrote three books about closed captioning, most notably The Closed Captioning Handbook, published by Focal Press, then an imprint of Elsevier.

He presented a TED Talk at TEDxBozeman in 2014 entitled, "Does closed captioning still serve deaf people?"

== Works ==
=== Children's picture books ===
The Who Pooped in the Park? series is published by Farcountry Press in Helena, Montana. Each book in the series focuses on the indigenous wildlife of a particular National Park or ecosystem in the United States. Robson has used two different illustrators. Elijah Brady Clark illustrated the first six books, and Robert Rath has illustrated the rest.

- Who Pooped in Central Park? – ISBN 9781560376545 (2016)
- Who Pooped in the Redwoods? – ISBN 9781560376293 (2015)
- Who Pooped in the Cascades? – ISBN 9781560373629 (2013)
- Who Pooped in the North Woods? – ISBN 9781560374343 (2008)
- Who Pooped on the Colorado Plateau? – ISBN 9781560374305 (2008)
- Who Pooped in the Black Hills? – ISBN 9781560373872 (2007)
- Who Pooped in the Park? (Death Valley National Park) – ISBN 9781560374039 (2007)
- Who Pooped in the Park? (Big Bend National Park) – ISBN 9781560373889 (2006)
- Who Pooped in the Park? (Acadia National Park) – ISBN 9781560373384 (2006)
- Who Pooped in the Park? (Olympic National Park) – ISBN 9781560373377 (2006)
- Who Pooped in the Sonoran Desert? – ISBN 9781560373490 (2006)
- Who Pooped in the Park? (Shenandoah National Park) – ISBN 9781560373391 (2006)
- Who Pooped in the Park? (Sequoia/Kings Canyon National Parks) – ISBN 9781560373278 (2006)
- Who Pooped in the Park? (Rocky Mountain National Park) – ISBN 9781560373209 (2005)
- Who Pooped in the Park? (Grand Canyon National Park) – ISBN 9781560373193 (2005)
- Who Pooped in the Park? (Red Rock Canyon National Conservation Area) – ISBN 9781560373711 (2005)
- Who Pooped in the Park? (Yosemite National Park) – ISBN 9781560373186 (2005)
- Who Pooped in the Park? (Grand Teton National Park) – ISBN 9781560372806 (2004)
- Who Pooped in the Park? (Glacier National Park) – ISBN 9781560372790 (2004)
- Who Pooped in the Park? (Yellowstone National Park) – ISBN 9781560372738 (2004)

=== Fantasy ===
- The Bounds of Magic – ISBN 9781945110139 (2026) – Proseyr Publishing

=== Tea Books ===
- Myths & Legends of Tea, Volume 1 – ISBN 9780965960953 (2015) – Proseyr Publishing
- A Tea Journey: Your Personal Tea Cupping Journal – ISBN 9780965960960 (2015) – Proseyr Publishing

=== Closed captioning and related technologies ===
- The Closed Captioning Handbook – ISBN 9780240805610 (2004) – Focal Press
- Alternative Realtime Careers – ISBN 9781881859512 (2000) – NCRA Press
- Inside Captioning – ISBN 9780965960908 (1997) – NCRA Press

=== Other nonfiction ===
- Gary's Guide to Successful Book Signings – ISBN 9780965960984 (2016) – Proseyr Publishing
- The Very Best of the Red Lodge Local Rag – ISBN 9780965960977 (2015) – Proseyr Publishing
- The Darkest Hour: A Comprehensive Account of the Smith Mine Disaster of 1943, 3rd edition – ISBN 9780965960946 (2015) – Proseyr Publishing (with Fay Kuhlman)
- The Court Reporter's Guide to Cyberspace – ISBN 9780965151801 (1996) – Cyberdawg Publishing (with Richard A. Sherman)

== Awards and recognition ==
- 1997 Andrew Saks Engineering Award
- 2014 Moonbeam Children's Book Awards Silver medal in Non-Fiction – Animals, Who Pooped in the Cascades?
- 2014 High Plains Book Award Finalist, Who Pooped in the Cascades?
- 2025 Next Generation Indie Book Award Winner, Children's Educational Picture Book, Who Pooped in the Park, Rocky Mountain National Park
- 2025 Creative Child Magazine Award Book of the Year in the Adventure Storybooks category, Who Pooped in the Park, Yellowstone National Park
