= Pig racing =

Sport in which juvenile pigs race around track

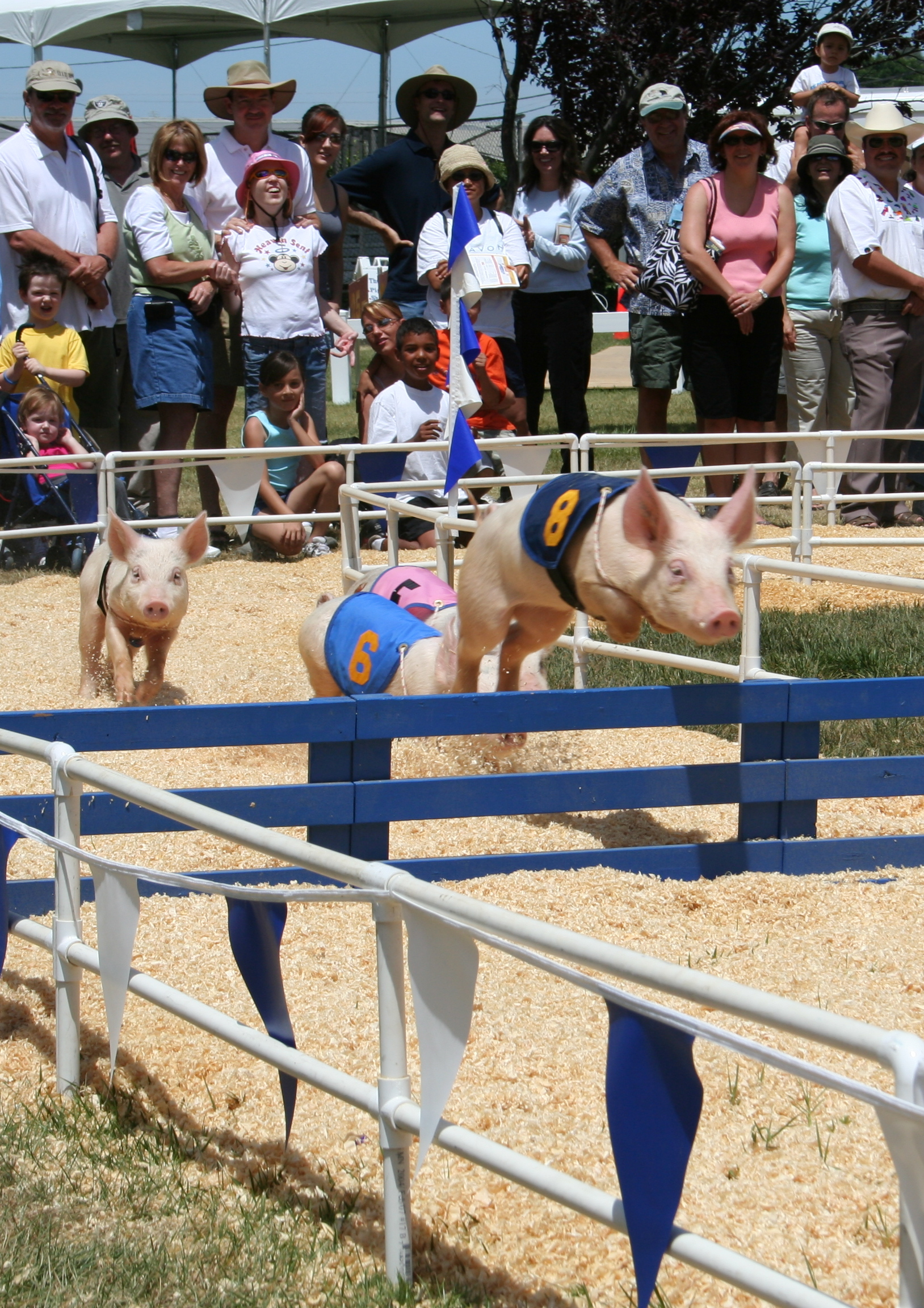
A pig leaping a fence in a race at Pleasanton, California.

Pig racing is a sport in which juvenile pigs race around in a small, enclosed area of either dirt, fake grass, gravel track or steel-framed enclosures. This racing is usually purely for entertainment or charity, and betting is rarely part of it, as the races are family-friendly events.

== Equipment ==
The pigs are equipped with vests to differentiate each pig from another. To distinguish the pigs racing, the vests are either colour-coded or have numbers on them. Puppet jockeys are sometimes attached to the vests for entertainment purposes.

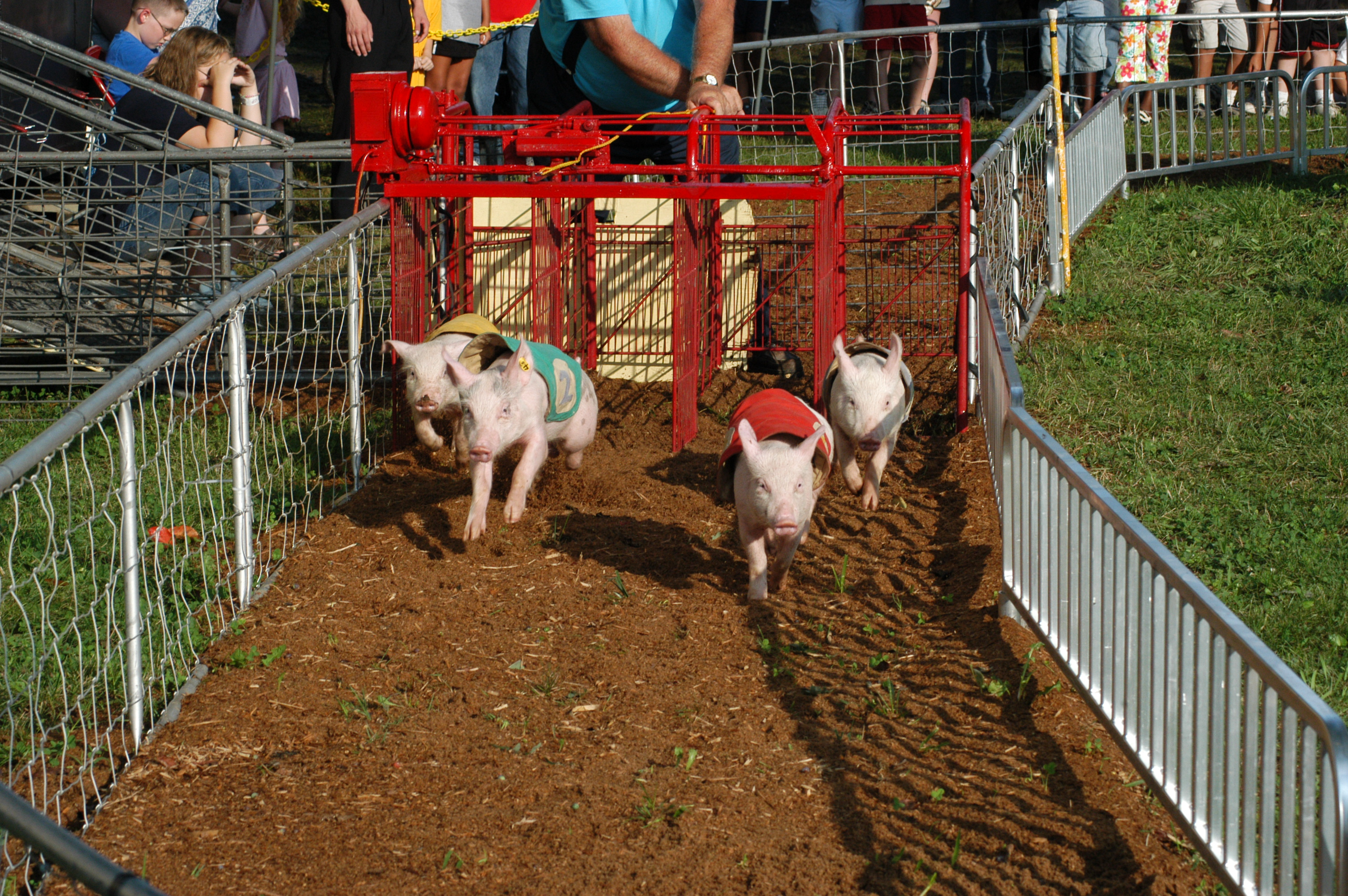
Pigs race away from the starting gate

The course includes a variety of obstacles which the pigs have to race through, such as tunnels, tyre ramps, hay bales and a series of locked gates. The course distance can vary in length depending on the type of race. The race can be a normal race on the track or a race with obstacles. Most races at the end of the finishing line have a prize waiting for the winning pig, usually food.

== Countries ==
=== Australia ===
Pig racing is practised in Australia. The MTV Promotions Pig Racing hosts pig racing events which cover all Major Royal Shows and have been running since 1993. The pigs are trained through a 4-week course to prepare them mentally and physically for the race. The pigs run a 50-metre (55 yd) track in a 10-by-20-metre (11 yd × 22 yd) space and there are two races within the 15-minute show production. The pigs get ready at the starting gates while their coloured vests are fitted on them and they wait for the whistle to be blown before they start to race.

Noah's Farm Thoroughbred Pig Racing hosts pig races for entertainment purposes and fundraisers for organisations. The pigs are raised in free-range conditions and begin training for races when they are approximately 5 to 6 weeks of age. For the race, five pigs are pitted against each other wearing coloured jackets. The track dimensions are 14 by 6 metres (15.3 yd × 6.6 yd), and 15 to 20 small square bales of hay are used as obstacles. The race begins with a bugle call as the pigs begin to position themselves in their starting box and wait for the commencement of the race. The crowd counts down from five and then the starting gate opens once the count is finished. On the course, the pigs face tyres, gates and a maze of hay bales. The pigs start to race when they are around 4 weeks old an after being weaned, they continue racing until they are around 12 to 15 weeks old. For each race, a "Race Steward" is picked from the crowd to oversee the pig race. Children are allowed to name each pig, and the best name wins a prize.

The 2003 Sydney Royal Easter Show in held a pig racing event on Olympic Boulevard. The race featured nine pigs racing around a 36 metres (39 yd) track.

=== Ireland ===
The festival in Portlaoise is known for pig-racing, and it was tried in Durrow for their St. Patrick's day parade in 2009.

=== United Kingdom ===
Pig racing is practised in the United Kingdom. The South of England Rare Breeds Centre holds regular pig races in the summer. Natasha Raskin has also commented that Hall Park in Oswestry is also famous for pig racing. Piglet racing has become popular at the Royal Norfolk Show, which has a course of about 80 metres (87 yd) with three jumps with various breeds participating.

A proposal by the Winchester Cheese and Chilli Festival in August 2018 to stage a steeplechase for six rare-breed pigs over hurdles was abandoned after a campaign group, "Pigs Don't Race", got 46,873 signatures in an online campaign. The charity Animal Aid was quoted as noting "to run in front of potentially loud crowds in scorching heat...caused these sensitive animals undue stress, in addition to the distress and heat produced through transportation". The organisers said they withdrew the event due to continued hot temperatures and after consultations with relevant parties.

Joseph's Amazing Racing Pigs has five different breeds of pigs for racing: Tamworths, Gloucester Old Spots, Saddlebacks, Berkshires, and Oxford Sandy and Blacks. The track dimensions are 65 by 5 metres (71.1 yd × 5.5 yd) of roped off grass area for the track and a 15 by 15 metres (16 yd × 16 yd) display area for the pigs to interact with the audience. The pigs are encouraged to race down the track by the handlers, who shake a bucket of food for the pigs. The pigs are weaned for approximately 10 to 12 weeks and are raised naturally and are not given growth hormones or antibiotics. Once the pigs become too big to race, they are returned to where they came from and new sets of pigs replace them.

Pennywell Farm in South Devon, England holds pig races every day. They use specially-bred pigs called miniature pigs, which they started breeding in 1992. The average pig weighs 250 grams (8.8 oz) at birth.

=== United States ===
A pig race in the United States.

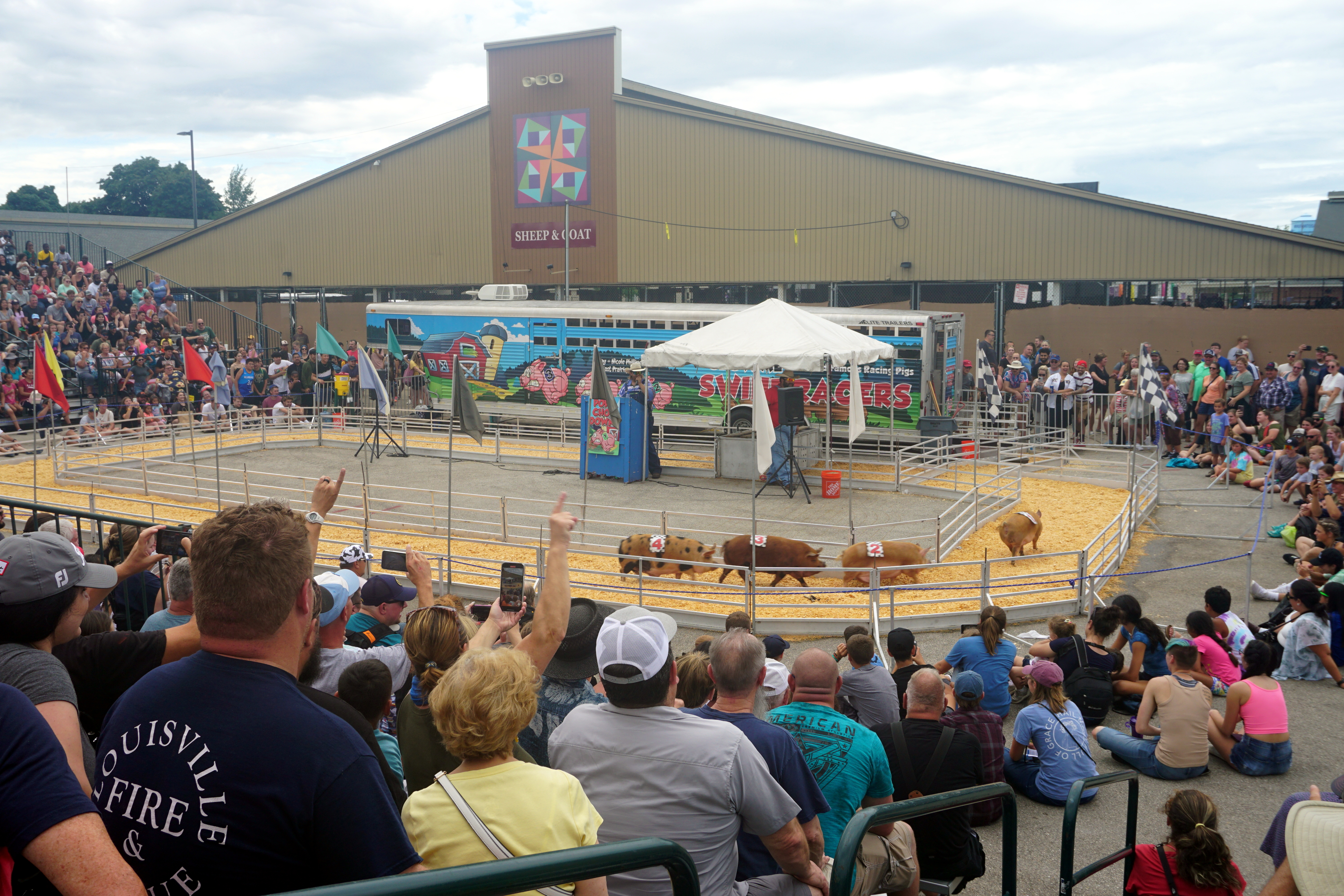
A pig race at the Wisconsin State Fair

Pig racing is most popular in the Southern United States. The city of Charlotte, North Carolina will occasionally host pig races before other sporting events. The annual Houston Livestock Show and Rodeo bills itself as the largest in the world, and the second-largest fair or festival of any kind in North America. Besides the pro rodeo events and livestock exhibitions, pig racing is featured. The minor league baseball team the St. Paul Saints hosts pig races at their stadium during select home games.

The newest pig-racing show traveling the United States is called Hot Dog Pig Races, which includes pig racing and dachshunds. You can find them at fairs and festivals such as Meadowlands State Fair, New Jersey; Ocean County Fair, New Jersey; Dundalk Heritage Festival, Maryland; and the Pig Gig Bay City, Michigan. All-Alaskan Racing Pigs, Sue Wee Pigs and Ugly Pig Racing are other shows traveling the United States. The Bear Creek Saloon and Steakhouse in Bear Creek, Montana, has hosted pig races during the summer season since 1992.

The All-Alaskan Racing Pig hosts pig racing events in the northwest United States with pigs racing on a 91-metre (100 yd) dash course and 46-metre (50 yd) hurdle course. During every show, two teams of four pigs race on flat tracks and high hurdles. At the end of each show, there is a championship round. The race is mainly for entertainment purposes, as it is only for 'pure fun'. They use Gloucestershire Old Spots to race and begin training when they are about 10 weeks old. They travel with 10 pigs, eight for daily races and two spares. The pigs race four times a day.

Bob Hale Racing Stables holds pig races at the Michigan State Fair in which 19 pigs race in seven free daily shows. The pigs race around a 27-metre (90 ft) oval track with 20-centimetre (8 in) bars as obstacles to jump over. The pigs are trained and take four 8-hour days to complete a lap. The pigs run from the starting line to the paddock, where there is food. Once they finish eating the food, the pigs are put back on the starting line and the food on the paddock is replenished. They run to get the food again. The pigs are checked by vets if any of them catch a disease after a carnival or event.

Vogel's Pig Racing hosts pig racing events at many state fairs. The pigs are three months old and race around a series of red pens set up like a circular racetrack. The pigs can be trained to run in three days. The pigs are split into three divisions: men's, women's and Nascar at the South Dakota State Fair in Huron. Three pigs compete in each division, weighing around 27–29 kilograms (60–65 lb) each. At the end of the finish line, there would be an Oreo waiting for the pig who crosses the finish line first.

Leader Area Pig Races hosts county fairs, special events, and benefits from Memorial Day to Labor Day. They use five pigs at a time to race on a circular track. The pigs are named after a person in the crowd, and the prizes won by the winning pig are awarded to both the pig and the person from the crowd. Originally it was supposed to be a gambling/betting race, but the state of Minnesota wouldn't allow gambling on pigs, so it became a family-friendly event. It takes two weeks to train the pigs for racing. The first week of training is teaching the pigs to run around the track by bribing them with doughnuts at the finish line. The second week is devoted to getting the pigs used to large crowds.

The Swifty Swine Productions showcases pig racing events at the Franklin County Show located in Greenfield, Ohio. The pig race is held at the 'Pork Chop International Speedway' track course featuring two races, one with baby pigs and the other with full-grown pigs. Both piglets and full-grown pigs are given names spun off of celebrities' names, such as Brad Pig, Kevin Bacon, Justin Beiboar and Elvis Pigsley. Once the gate opens, the pigs race around a track, competing for an Oreo cookie on a silver plate at the end of the finish line. The races are held on Saturdays and Sundays. After each race, the pigs return to their trailer to take a nap and wait for the next race. However, if they do not return to the trailer, they stay behind to take photos with the public. The races are sponsored by the Greenfield Farmers Cooperative Exchange.

The PigTuckey Derby is a pig race held in Denver Down Farm every fall.

The Bengston's Pumpkin Farm and Fall Fast often holds pig races. The pigs wear a colored, numbered bib when racing around the track.

== International ==
Pig racing also occurs in the Pig Olympics. 12 pigs participate in the race from seven countries with each pig wearing a numbered bib. Betting occurs in the Pig Olympics. After the pigs participate in the Pig Olympics, 'they go on to produce a new generation of sport pigs'.

== Controversy ==
Some see pig racing as a cruel sport, and have called for pig racing events to be cancelled. In Australia in 2010, animal rights activists protested against a race at the Paddington Tavern in Brisbane and called for the event to be cancelled. The event had the support of the Royal Society for the Prevention of Cruelty to Animals (RSPCA).

In Ireland in 2015, an online petition against a pig racing event at the Arklow Seabreeze Festival held in Wicklow was signed by over 2,400 people. The pigs race in an hour-long event, running the course five times for a total distance of around 30 metres (33 yd). The festival committee was quoted as saying "the welfare of the pigs is of utmost concern and important to us... a pig handler is also present to ensure no harm or cruelty is inflicted on any of his pigs". The race went ahead, and the festival committee defended the event by saying that many other Irish festivals hold pig races.

The Comet Pub in Santry's hosts pig races at the Comet 4th of July Festival in Dublin, Ireland. The pig race is the main event of the festival, and all money raised is donated to two charities. In 2018, the pig racing event gained the public's awareness, which resulted in protests to cancel the event. This was due to health concerns about the heat on the day of the race, which was 26 °C (79 °F). For the event, the pub was supported by the Gardai, the Dublin City Council, and the Dublin Fire Brigade. A vet from the Department of Agriculture agreed to supervise the race to ensure the pigs welfare. Six pigs wore puppet jockeys on their backs and raced down a ramp and up to the pub while jumping over hurdles. Protesters in 2018 said it was cruel for the pigs to be put on a noisy track with the sun on their skin. In response, the pub noted that "It's done in fun, it's not done in a dangerous way".
