= Bear Creek Saloon and Steakhouse =

Restaurant in Montana

Bearcreek Downs
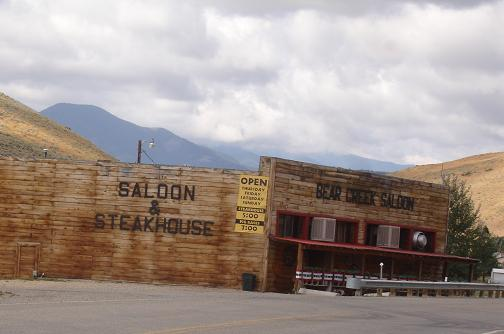
- Headquarters: Bearcreek, Montana, USA
- Services: Saloon and Steakhouse
- Owner: Dawn Deville & Tim Ryan
- Website: www.redlodge.com/bearcreek/

Bearcreek Saloon and Steakhouse is a restaurant in the small town of Bearcreek, Montana. The Saloon was family owned by (Bobby) Pits & Lynn DeArmond since it was purchased in 1982. Until Bobby "Pits" DeArmond passed away on April 4, 2020, while he was still included in the establishment. Lynn soon sold the restaurant to a close family friend Dawn Deville. The restaurant houses fund-raising pig races throughout the year that use full grown pigs in the summer and piglets in the winter, which are overseen by the Carbon County Health Department and the U.S. Department of Agriculture. The Saloon was involved in a lengthy legal battle over the legality of pig races with the Montana Board of Horse Racing, and it was eventually made legal in House Bill 433 in 1993. The Saloon is located seven miles outside of the city of Red Lodge, Montana on Montana Secondary Highway 308. Owner Bobby "Pitts" Dearmond was born and raised in Spearman, Texas before moving to Montana in the late 1970s.

== History ==
The saloon and steakhouse was bought in 1982 by the DeArmond family, and at the time was only a bar. A kitchen was added and began serving Mexican food in 1984. The bar's main clientele is tourists, but due to the 1988 Yellowstone Fires there was a sharp downturn in tourism in 1988. The DeArmond family developed the idea of pig races to draw more customers to the area and started the races in 1992. In 1994 the menu was switched to a classic saloon and steakhouse, to which it remains today. Bobby "Pitts" was featured on ABC Good Morning America a couple of times during this period.

== Pig races ==
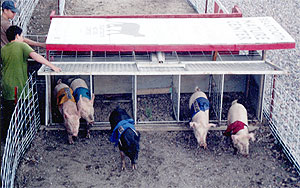
Pigs just getting out of the gate

The pig races are the main attraction at the Bear Creek Saloon. As told by the Füd Report from Montana, the racetrack is a short oval that is surrounding a golden statue of a pig, set up like a "minor league stadium" . The pigs start in a gate much like horse racing, and each race starts with the playing of "The Call to the Post" over a loudspeaker. The pigs race around the track to a trough full of vegetables. There are a total of 12 races each night, one every 15 minutes, and each race has five pigs racing.

The pigs are provided by a local 4-H club, and each pig can be purchased by a sponsor every racing season. The sponsor names the pig and a jersey made for it. Some past pigs names have been "Pumpkin Butt", "Raquel Belch", "Knuckles", "Pig O'War", "Ursowla Hamdress", and "Notta Hot Dog". After the racing season is over, the pig is slaughtered and the sponsor has the option of donating the meat to charity or to keep it themselves. Pig Sponsors also can purchase billboard space around the racetrack, adding to the "stadium" effect. Some sponsors in the past have been the Riverboat Casino in Billings, Montana, the U.S. Bank in Red Lodge, Shipton's Big R ranch supplies in Billings, and Maxwell's restaurant in Cody, Wyoming. The Carbon County Health Department and the U.S. Department of Agriculture oversee the health and condition of the pigs.

In December 2003 the DeArmond family developed the idea to host indoor pig races in the winter season by using a custom built racetrack on the stage inside the Saloon. The piglets are all between 5–6 weeks old and they race until they get to be 10–12 weeks old.

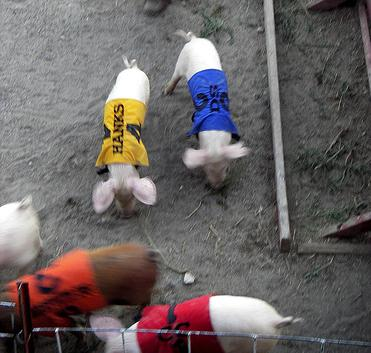
Pigs enjoying a meal after a race!

== Betting for fund raising ==
The Pig races that the Saloon hosts are fundraisers. Each race has a betting card assigned to it, which has a total of 25 spots. In the first eleven races the cost for one spot is $2. In the final race one spot costs $5. The total for the first eleven races is $50 a betting card and $125 for the final race.

Racemaster Pits DeArmond starts the race process by asking for a volunteer, who rolls a pair of five sided dice. The first die has the letters A-E on a side, and the second die has the numbers 1-5 on a side. The rolling of the dice essentially creates coordinates on the betting card determine which slots are assigned to a pig. After all five pigs have been assigned the race proceeds and the winning pig's owner claims their prize. The prize is $25 for the first eleven races and $100 for the final race. Fund raising is part of every race, with the remaining $25 being donated to local scholarships to Carbon County students. Over $107,000 has been raised to date.

== Legal battle ==
According to the Seattle Post Intelligencer, the DeArmond family held pig races for four years before being served with a cease and desist letter from the Montana Board of Horse Racing in 1992. The Board argued that recent drop in gambling revenue to the State was due partly "because of the pig racing operation and the relaxing of gambling laws." The board only had jurisdiction over pigs because of an older segment of law that gave them jurisdiction over racing of all animals

After the pig racing was shut down at the Saloon, business was down 60 percent. The DeArmond Family, along with the help of State Rep. Alvin Ellis Jr., found a loophole in the law that allowed sports pools, which led to the fund raising system and the use of betting cards. Ellis said the anti-pig-racing forces were "very heavy-handed, belligerent, and talked nonsense about things like doping (racing) pigs. They pretended not to know there's no way you can `fix' a pool-betting situation, where 20 of the 25 people on the board don't get anything because there's only five pigs racing." Eventually the DeArmond family won out and have been hosting pig racing ever since.

== See also ==
- Bearcreek, Montana
- Red Lodge, Montana
- Yellowstone National Park
- Billings, Montana
