= Bearcreek Bank =

- U.S. National Register of Historic Places
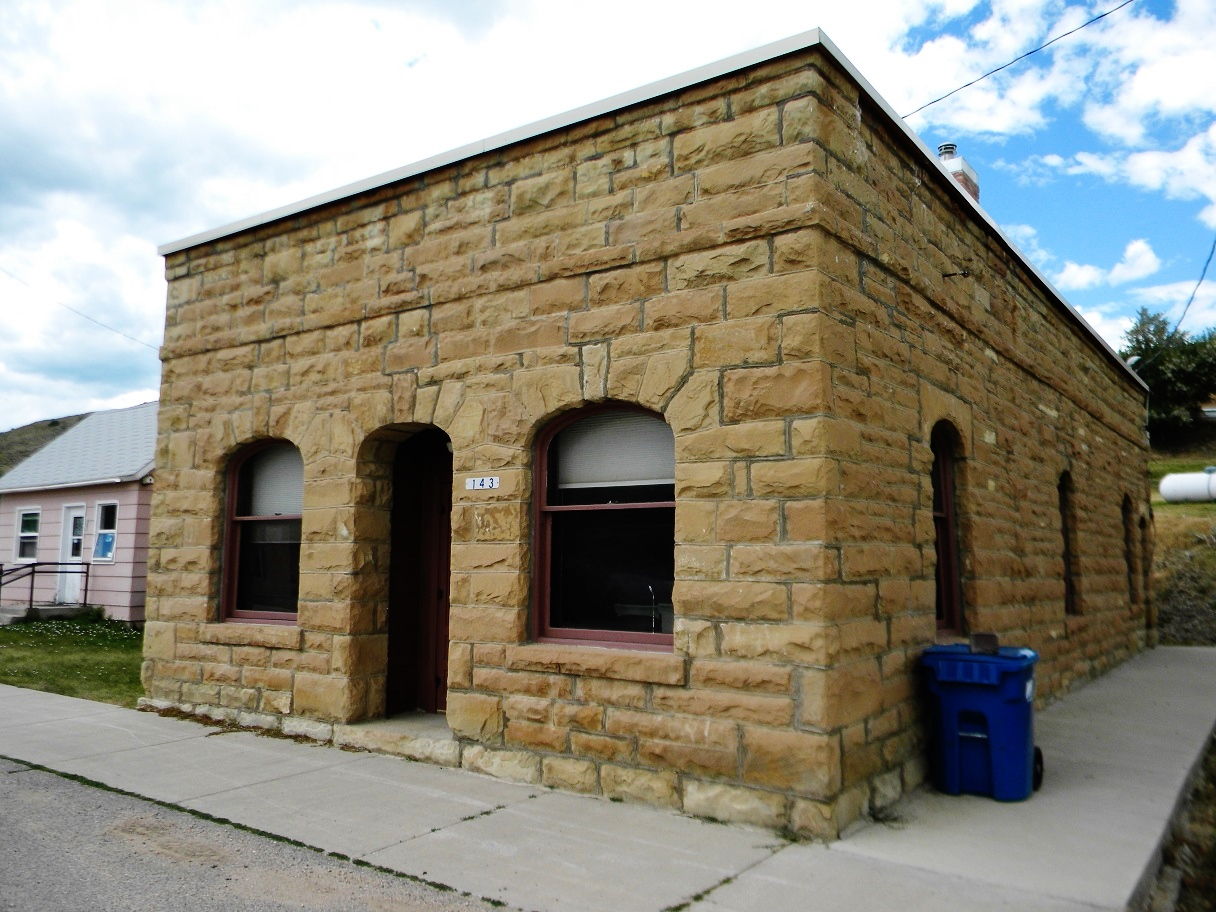
- Bearcreek Bank in 2015

- Location within Montana Location within the United States
- Location: Main and Second Sts., Bearcreek, Montana
- Coordinates: 45°9′40″N 109°9′30″W
- Area: less than one acre
- Built: 1906
- Built by: Russell, John
- Architectural style: Romanesque
- NRHP reference No.: 04000251
- Added to NRHP: March 31, 2004

Bearcreek Bank is a site on the National Register of Historic Places located in Bearcreek, Montana. It was added to the Register on March 31, 2004.

Initially the bank was a branch of Carbon County Bank headquartered in Red Lodge, Montana. In 1907, the bank was renamed the Bearcreek Bank with Copper King William A. Clark as the president. Beginning in 1911 the name Clark-Wright Bank in Bearcreek began appearing in advertisements. The bank closed in 1920 after the International Coal Company defaulted on a $170,000 loan. In 1921 it reopened as Miners' State Bank with former mine foreman Tom Frasure as president. The bank closed permanently in 1928.

The bank building serves as a hub for the Bearcreek commercial district. When the nomination form was submitted in 2002 the building housed the town hall. Purchased by Bert Vaill and built by prominent area stonemason John Russell, it is a one-story Romanesque style with sandstone quarried just north of town. According to the site placard: "Symbolizing Vaill’s faith in Bearcreek’s future, the bank’s thick stone walls were also meant to assure customers that their money was safe from theft and bank failure, a tenuous assumption in the days before Federal Deposit Insurance."
