= Bearcreek, Montana =

- Town
- Location of Bearcreek, Montana
- Coordinates: 45°09′38″N 109°09′27″W
- Country: United States
- State: Montana
- County: Carbon

Area
  - Total: 0.12 sq mi (0.30 km^{2})
  - Land: 0.12 sq mi (0.30 km^{2})
  - Water: 0 sq mi (0.00 km^{2})
- Elevation: 4,551 ft (1,387 m)

Population (2020)
  - Total: 91
  - Density: 795.5/sq mi (307.14/km^{2})
- Time zone: UTC-7 (Mountain (MST))
  - Summer (DST): UTC-6 (MDT)
- ZIP code: 59007
- Area code: 406
- FIPS code: 30-04300
- GNIS feature ID: 2411671
- Website: townofbearcreekmt.com

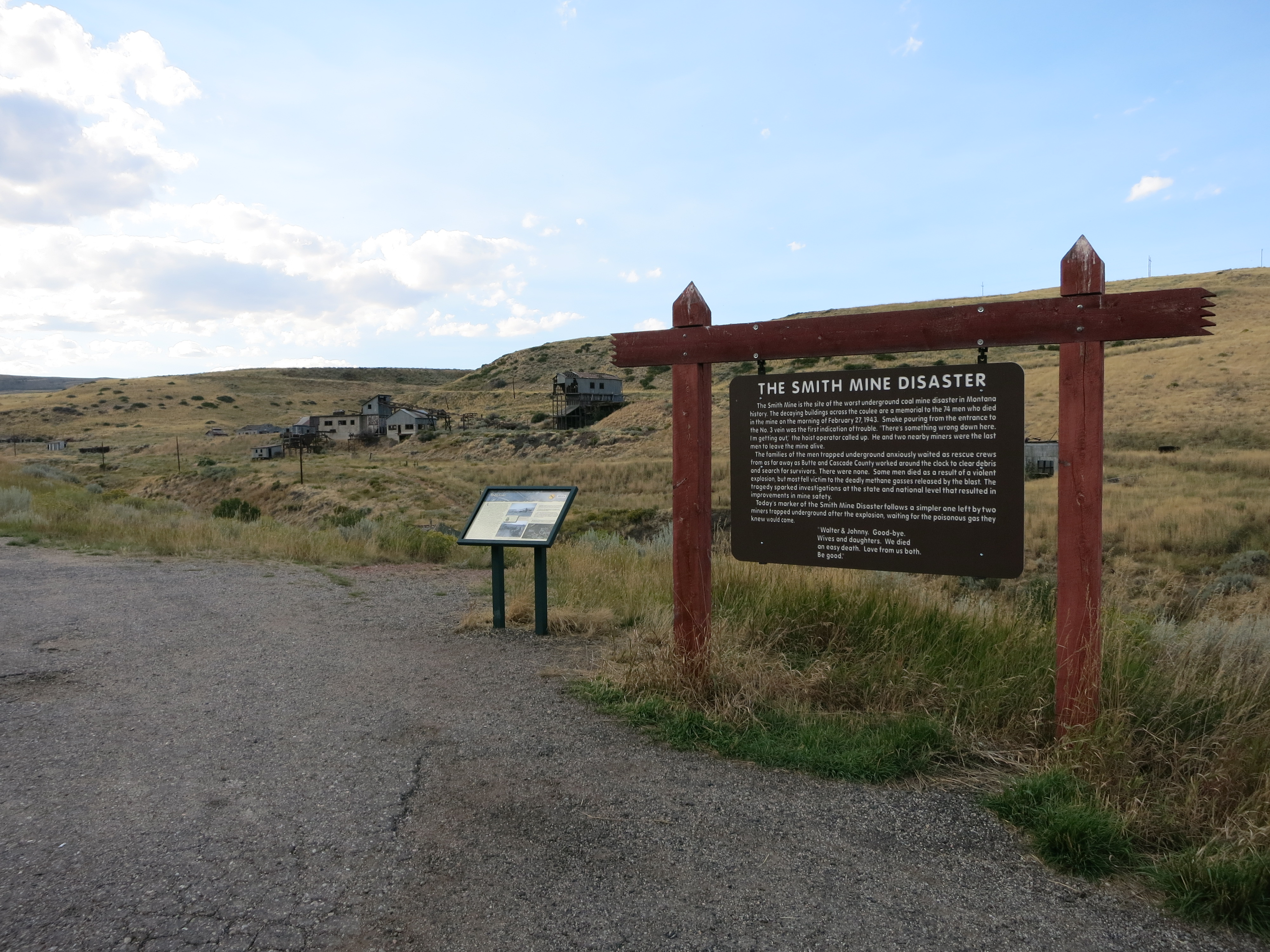
Smith Mine Historic District, Montana Highway 308 Bearcreek

Bearcreek is an incorporated town in Carbon County, Montana, United States. It is part of the Billings, Montana Metropolitan Statistical Area. The population was 91 at the 2020 census. Bearcreek uses the Mayor/Council form of government.

== History ==
Bearcreek owes its existence to area coal mining that began in the 1890s to supply coal for the Northern Pacific Railway and the Anaconda Company. The Bearcreek Post Office was established on November 22, 1905, with Sarah Criger as the town's first postmaster. The town was platted and incorporated after the arrival of the Montana, Wyoming & Southern Railroad in 1906.

The town of Bearcreek was named for Bear Creek, which runs through the middle of town. Bearcreek came into existence due to coal mines and grew rapidly following the building of a short line railroad connecting the Bearcreek mines to the Northern Pacific Railroad in 1906. Between 1906 and 1953, the mines at Bearcreek produced large volumes of coal, which was a higher grade than other regional sources, from the extensive underground coal mining deposits. The mines were located along the creek and also in the surrounding coulees. The development of the coal mines after 1906 drew miners to the area. They came from other parts of America, and from Serbia, Montenegro, Germany, Scotland and Italy. The recent immigrants built separate ethnic-based communities in the steep coulees that run down into Bearcreek, with names like Washoe, New Caledonia, Chickentown, Scotch Coulee, International, and Stringtown. At one time in the 1920s and 1930s the population of Bearcreek combined with the other surrounding small communities was close to 3,000 persons. Bearcreek and the surrounding communities had seven mercantiles, a bank, two hotels, two billiard halls, a brickyard, numerous saloons, and Bearcreek sported concrete sidewalks and their own water system. Allegedly, the town had no churches. The economy of Bear Creek was based on coal. The Smith Mine Disaster in 1943, followed by the decline in demand for coal in the late 1940s and 1950s caused the closure of the connecting railroad in 1953 and subsequently most of the coal mines, and the population declined steadily to less than 100 persons. Many buildings in Bearcreek and the surrounding communities were moved to other towns or demolished, and only a few structures remain.

The town is home to the Bearcreek Saloon which hosts fundraising pig races throughout the year. In addition, Bearcreek plays host every autumn to Montana Falconer Symposium, the state's largest gathering of falcon trainers and birds of prey enthusiasts.

Featured in the Star Trek television series Strange New Worlds Episode 1 of Season 1 as the home of Captain Christopher Pike.

=== The Montana Wyoming and Southern Railroad ===
The Montana, Wyoming and Southern (or MW&S) was an independent privately owned short rail spur built in 1906 from the main Northern Pacific Railroad (NP) line at Bridger, Montana through Belfry and on to the mines in and around Bearcreek.

=== Attraction of American and foreign born workers ===
After the MW&S railroad was built, Bearcreek expanded rapidly as coal production increased. American and foreign-born workers moved there, drawn by the expanding coal mining activity and the promise of steady work. By 1917, the mines around Bearcreek were employing 1,200 men. As the miners came they settled in small communities built in the small steep coulees running down into Bear Creek. At its peak, Bearcreek and the surrounding communities of Washoe, New Caledonia, Chickentown, Scotch Coulee, International, and Stringtown, had a population of about 3,000 people, most of whom worked in the coal mines.

From 1906 onward, Bearcreek attracted a large contingent of Serbian/Slavic immigrants from Serbia and Montenegro. The many Serb families brought their culture and their customs to Bearcreek. With its diverse ethnic composition, Bearcreek traditionally celebrated Christmas twice, on December 25 and January 6, the Serbian Orthodox Church holiday.

=== Smith Mine Disaster ===
On February 27, 1943, the Smith Mine #3 exploded in the worst coal mining accident in the history of Montana. Of the 77 men who had gone underground at the start of the shift, only 3 survived. The bodies were all recovered. Thirty had died instantly. Forty four of the miners survived the initial blast, but were trapped underground in isolated parts of the mine, dying from initial injuries or from suffocation from methane and carbon monoxide poisoning. Some left farewell notes to their families. The Smith Mine reopened a few months after the disaster, yet closed for good two years later due to financial strain.

=== Events after the Smith Mine Disaster ===
In the late 1940s and early 1950s, there was a marked trend away from coal consumption in the American economy, due to utilization of natural gas or fuel oil for heating and the increasing use of diesel to power locomotives. Bearcreek's coal production went into a steady decline.

After the closure of the Smith Mine, and as the demand for coal declined so did the financial health of the Montana, Wyoming and Southern, which had always been precarious. The railroad ceased to operate in 1953. When the railroad ceased to function so did most of mining activity in and around Bearcreek, since the railroad was the only efficient way for mines to ship their coal to market. Some mines struggled on, but the last mine closed in the 1970s. After the closure of the railroad followed by most of the mines the town's population rapidly dwindled, eventually declining to under 100 people. The rails and ties were removed from the railroad bed and over time the many empty miners houses that once filled the coulees along Bear Creek were sold and moved, or they simply sat vacant and deteriorated until they were torn down.

Today, the many surrounding communities that made up Bearceek are almost completely gone, with only a few houses marking Washoe, currently the largest of them. In the last decades there is some growth of the tiny remaining community of Bearcreek thanks to its proximity to Red Lodge which has developed an economy to serve tourists who come to ski, or to use summer cabins, or to pass through to Yellowstone Park.

== Geography ==
Bearcreek is situated on Montana Secondary Highway 308, Bearcreek is about halfway between Red Lodge and Belfry.

According to the United States Census Bureau, the town has a total area of 0.12 square miles (0.31 km^{2}), all land.

== Demographics ==
Historical population
Census	Pop.	Note	%±
1910	302		—
1920	744		146.4%
1930	472		−36.6%
1940	324		−31.4%
1950	162		−50.0%
1960	61		−62.3%
1970	31		−49.2%
1980	61		96.8%
1990	37		−39.3%
2000	83		124.3%
2010	79		−4.8%
2020	91		15.2%
U.S. Decennial Census

=== 2010 census ===
As of the census of 2010, there were 79 people, 44 households, and 20 families residing in the town. The population density was 658.3 inhabitants per square mile (254.2/km^{2}). There were 51 housing units at an average density of 425.0 per square mile (164.1/km^{2}). The racial makeup of the town was 98.7% White and 1.3% from two or more races.

There were 44 households, of which 15.9% had children under the age of 18 living with them, 40.9% were married couples living together, 2.3% had a female householder with no husband present, 2.3% had a male householder with no wife present, and 54.5% were non-families. 43.2% of all households were made up of individuals, and 13.6% had someone living alone who was 65 years of age or older. The average household size was 1.80 and the average family size was 2.50.

The median age in the town was 53.5 years. 13.9% of residents were under the age of 18; 1.3% were between the ages of 18 and 24; 17.8% were from 25 to 44; 39.2% were from 45 to 64; and 27.8% were 65 years of age or older. The gender makeup of the town was 49.4% male and 50.6% female.

=== 2000 census ===
As of the census of 2000, there were 83 people, 38 households, and 22 families residing in the town. The population density was 690.3 inhabitants per square mile (266.5/km^{2}). There were 40 housing units at an average density of 332.7 per square mile (128.5/km^{2}). The racial makeup of the town was 96.39% White, 1.20% African American, and 2.41% from two or more races.

There were 38 households, out of which 31.6% had children under the age of 18 living with them, 34.2% were married couples living together, 18.4% had a female householder with no husband present, and 39.5% were non-families. 34.2% of all households were made up of individuals, and 7.9% had someone living alone who was 65 years of age or older. The average household size was 2.18 and the average family size was 2.35.

In the town, the population was spread out, with 21.7% under the age of 18, 10.8% from 18 to 24, 33.7% from 25 to 44, 28.9% from 45 to 64, and 4.8% who were 65 years of age or older. The median age was 35 years. For every 100 females, there were 97.6 males. For every 100 females age 18 and over, there were 85.7 males.

The median income for a household in the town was $32,917, and the median income for a family was $32,500. Males had a median income of $20,250 versus $25,000 for females. The per capita income for the town was $13,572. There were 3.8% of families and 12.6% of the population living below the poverty line, including 20.0% of under eighteens and none of those over 64.

== Education ==
Bearcreek is within the Belfry School District.

== Infrastructure ==
Red Lodge Airport is the nearest public airport. Billings Logan International Airport is the nearest commercial service airport.

The town is served by a volunteer fire department.

Beartooth Billings Clinic provides medical service to Carbon County.

== See also ==
- Bearcreek Bank
- Bear Creek Saloon and Steakhouse
