= The Local Rag =

The Local Rag may refer to:

- The Local Rag (newspaper), a newspaper published in Red Lodge, Montana
- The Local Rag (film), a 1986 Australian TV movie
