= Red Lodge Commercial Historic District =

Historic district in Montana, United States

- U.S. National Register of Historic Places
- U.S. Historic district
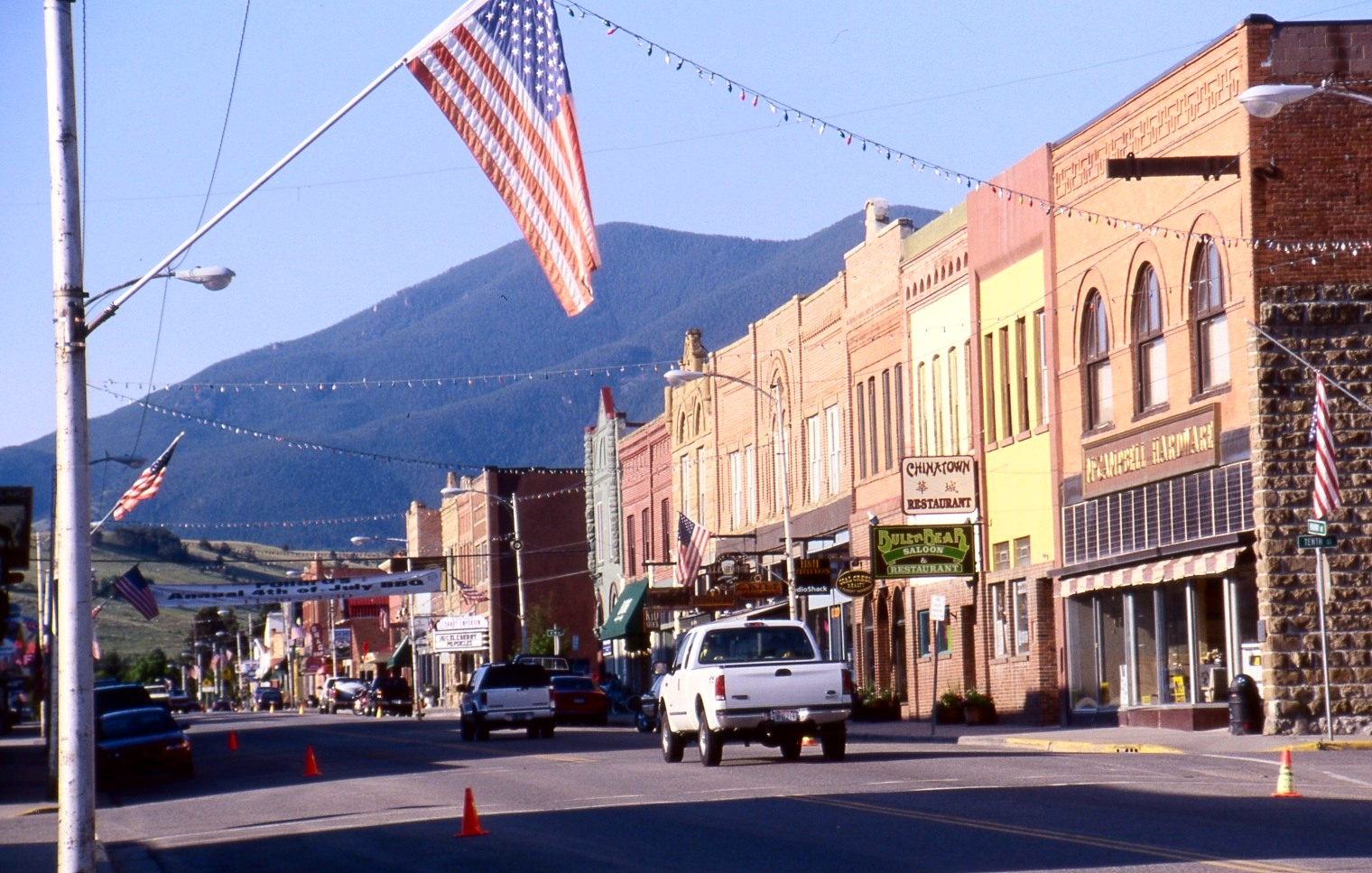
- Main Street, Red Lodge, July 2000

- Location within Montana Location within the United States
- Location: Roughly Broadway from 8th to 13th Sts., Red Lodge, Montana
- Coordinates: 45.18836°N 109.24704°W
- Area: 12 acres (4.9 ha)
- Architect: Multiple
- Architectural style: Classical Revival, Gothic, Romanesque
- NRHP reference No.: 83001057
- Added to NRHP: April 14, 1983

The Red Lodge Commercial Historic District is located in Red Lodge, Montana, between Broadway from 8th to 13th Sts. Its buildings include the Carbon County Courthouse, the Carbon County Hospital and Sanitarium, and the Iris Theater.

The downtown has been redeveloped for historic and cultural tourism. The Carbon County Historic District released its Revitalization Plan for the Historic District in 1986. The buildings in downtown Red Lodge had fallen into disrepair, in large part because population had dropped from its 1915 peak of 6000 people to about 2,000.

As of 2006, an estimate suggests that the population of Red Lodge may increase from about 1,200 people in the winter to over 1,800 people during the summer tourist season, arriving via the Beartooth Highway.

"In early 2006, Red Lodge was selected to become a pilot community in the first year of Montana's new Main Street program, which is an affiliate of the National Main Street Center. The program is designed to assist with the economic and historic revitalization of traditional downtown districts."

In 2010, the American Planning Association featured the district as one of its "Great Places in America - Streets."
