= Montana Southern Railway =

Railroad in Montanta

Overview
- Headquarters: Wise River (Allentown), Montana
- Locale: Divide - Coolidge, Montana
- Dates of operation: 1917–1940

Technical
- Track gauge: 3 ft (914 mm)

The Montana Southern Railway, now defunct, was an American 3 ft (914 mm) narrow gauge railroad constructed between Divide, Montana and the mining district of Coolidge, Montana. The short-lived line was noteworthy in that it was the last common carrier narrow gauge railroad to be constructed in the United States.

== History ==
The Montana Southern Railway was largely the brainchild of William R. Allen, a politician and entrepreneur who had served as the lieutenant governor of Montana between 1909 and 1913. Allen was the president of the Boston-Montana Mining Company, which was developing a large silver-mining operation in the remote Pioneer Mountains of far southwestern Montana. Because of the site's remoteness and poor access, a railroad was considered to be a necessary component of the mining district's development.

The railway was first incorporated in 1914 as the "Southern Montana Railway." Construction of the line began in earnest in 1917 after the company was reincorporated as the Montana Southern Railway. Completed on November 1, 1919, the railroad ran westward from a connection with the Oregon Short Line Railroad at Divide, following the Big Hole River upstream to the town of Wise River, Montana, also known as Allentown. From there, the railroad headed south into the Pioneer Mountains, terminating at the booming mining camp of Coolidge, where the Boston-Montana had constructed a 750-ton per day oil flotation mill and other developments. In all, the line was about 38 miles long.

The headquarters and repair shops of the Montana Southern were located in Wise River. The steam locomotives and rolling stock used on the line were acquired second-hand from the Florence and Cripple Creek Railroad in Colorado, which had recently been abandoned.

The vast majority of the Montana Southern's freight and passenger traffic came from the Coolidge mining region, and as the mines there declined in the 1920s, the railroad followed suit. The railroad entered receivership in 1923 and was reorganized twice, first as the "Montana Southern Railroad" and later as the "Montana Southwestern Railway." The line was heavily damaged by a flood in 1927, and apparently not reopened until 1930. The railroad sat mostly idle after about 1933, and the tracks were finally removed in 1940. Its formal abandonment was completed in 1941.
