= The Local Rag (newspaper) =

- Type: Monthly newspaper
- Format: Tabloid
- Owner(s): Gary D. Robson and Kathryn Robson
- Publisher: Gary D. Robson
- Editor: Heather Robson
- Founded: 1991 (as The Red Lodge Local)
- Headquarters: Red Lodge, MT; United States
- Price: Free

The Local Rag was a monthly alternative newspaper published in Red Lodge, Montana. It focused on local content. It shipped free to every mailing address in Red Lodge and the surrounding towns of Bearcreek, Fox, Roberts, Luther, and Washoe. The Local Rag was funded by advertising.

The paper was founded in 1991 by Lou Ward, former owner of the Jemez Valley Voice in New Mexico.

The business was listed as inactive in 2019 by the Montana Secretary of State's office.
