= Red Lodge, Montana =

City in Montana, United States

- City
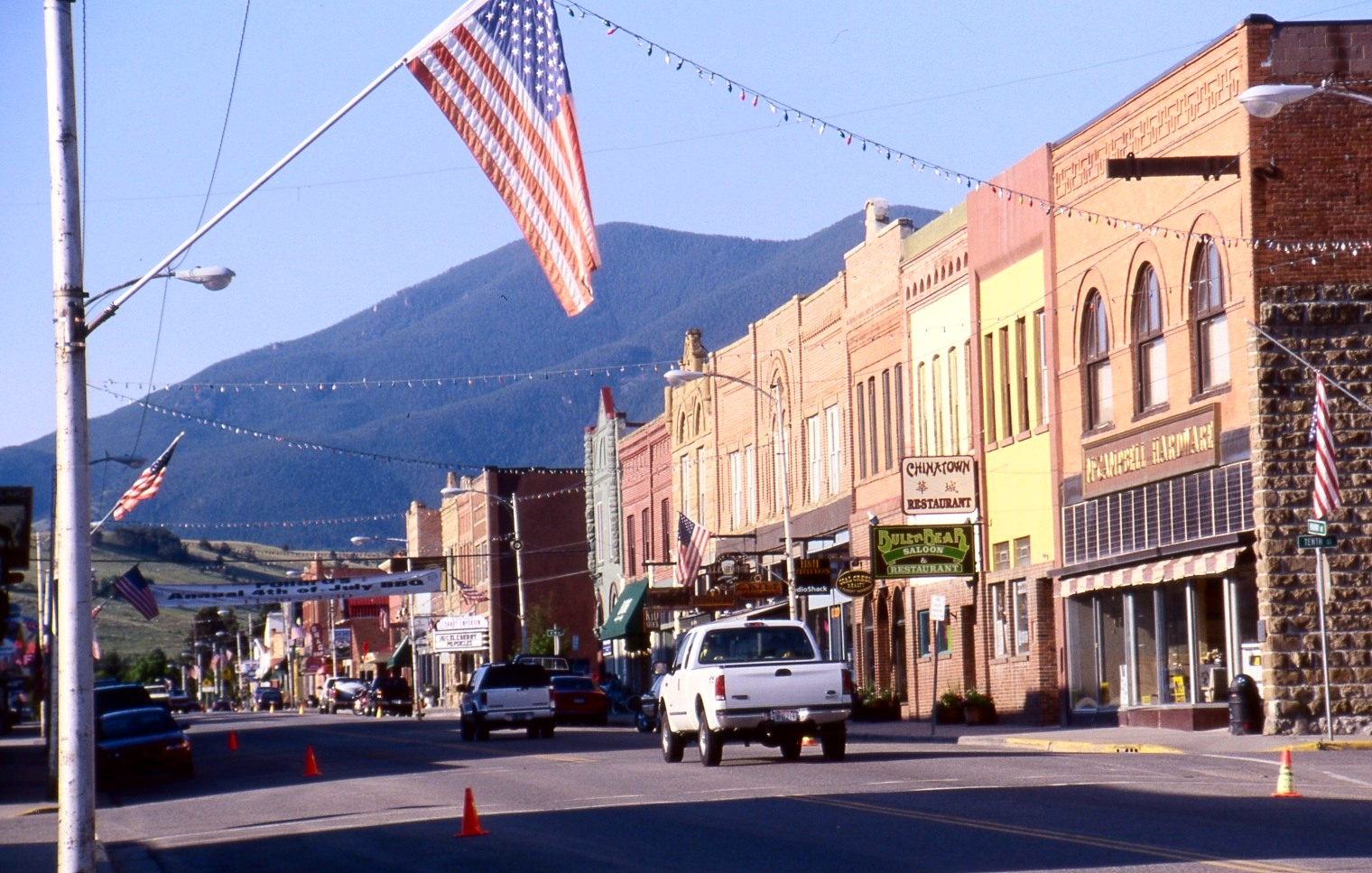
- Main Street (2000)

- Flag Logo

- Location within Carbon County and Montana
- Coordinates: 45°11′36″N 109°14′55″W
- Country: United States
- State: Montana
- County: Carbon

Area
  - Total: 2.71 sq mi (7.03 km^{2})
  - Land: 2.71 sq mi (7.03 km^{2})
  - Water: 0 sq mi (0.00 km^{2})
- Elevation: 5,588 ft (1,703 m)

Population (2020)
  - Total: 2,257
  - Density: 832.1/sq mi (321.27/km^{2})
- Time zone: UTC-7 (Mountain (MST))
  - Summer (DST): UTC-6 (MDT)
- ZIP code: 59068
- Area code: 406
- FIPS code: 30-61525
- GNIS ID: 2411529
- Website: cityofredlodge.net

Red Lodge is a city and county seat of Carbon County, Montana, United States. As of the 2020 census, the population of the city was 2,257.

== History ==
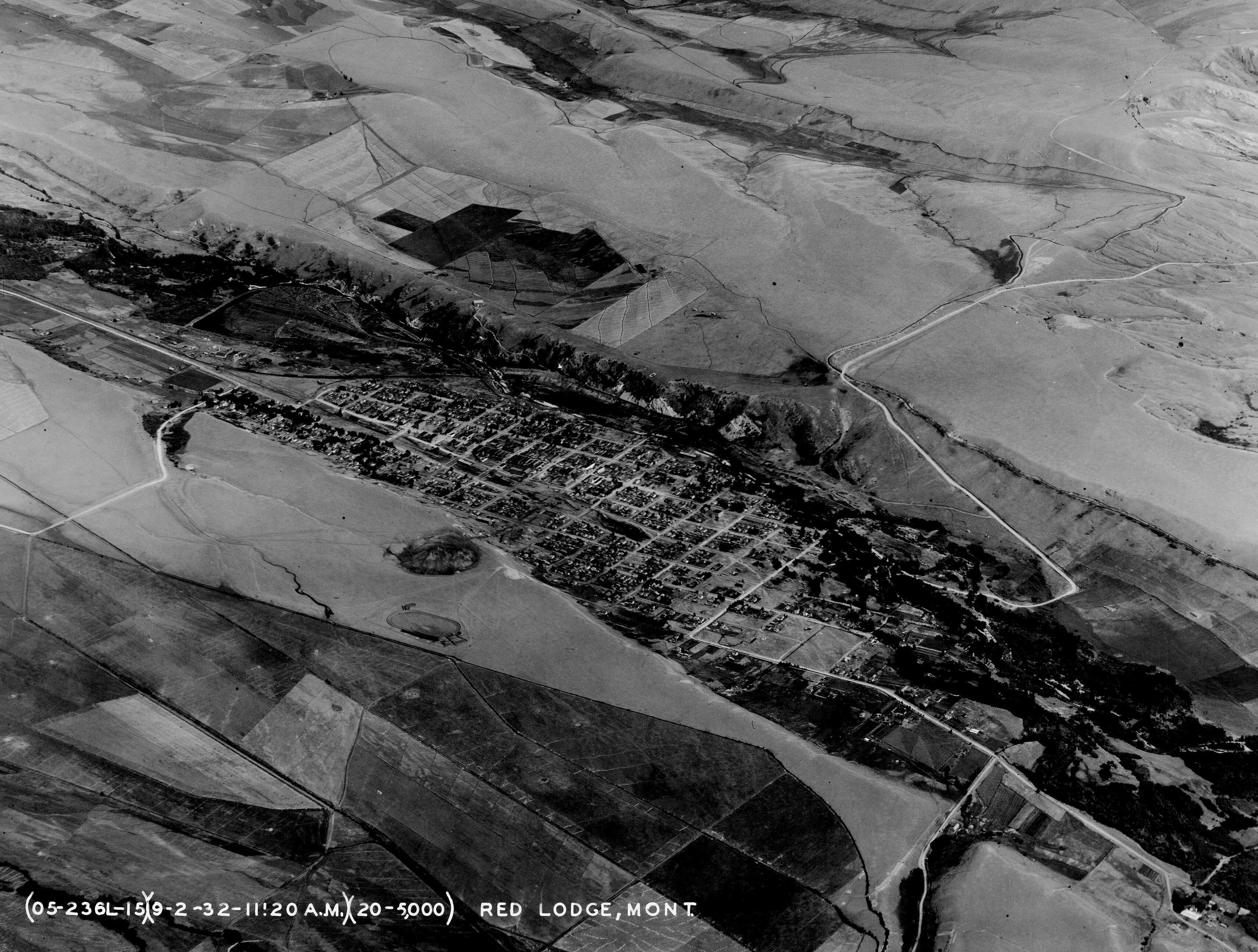
Aerial view, 1932

On September 17, 1851, the United States government signed a treaty with the Crow Nation, confirming control of the area which now contains Red Lodge to the Crow Indians. Rich coal deposits were found there in 1866, and gold was discovered nearby in 1870. An 1880 treaty between the U.S. government and the Crow allowed the area to be settled starting April 11, 1882.

The Red Lodge post office was established on December 9, 1884, with Postmaster Ezra L. Benton. A rail line was constructed into town, and coal shipments began in June 1889. The boundaries of the Crow Reservation were redrawn October 15, 1892, opening the whole area to settlement. From then until the 1930s, coal mining defined the town.

In the late 19th century, many new settlers came to Red Lodge, MT. The majority came from Italy, the British Isles, Finland, Norway, Sweden, Germany, and Austria-Hungary. By the mid-1880s, migrants were still outnumbered by large numbers of Native Americans. By 1892 the population reached 1,180.

In 1896, Red Lodge had twenty saloons and, as the library records show, riotous and violent living was characteristic of the town. By 1906 the population had grown to 4,000 and by 1911 this had increased to 5,000.

Red Lodge suffered in the Great Depression, which forced many mines to close. To offset this downturn, the manufacture of illegal bootleg liquor, labeled syrup, became an economic mainstay and was sold as far away as Chicago and San Francisco.

In 1931 work began on the Beartooth Highway linking Red Lodge to Yellowstone National Park; it was officially opened in 1936.

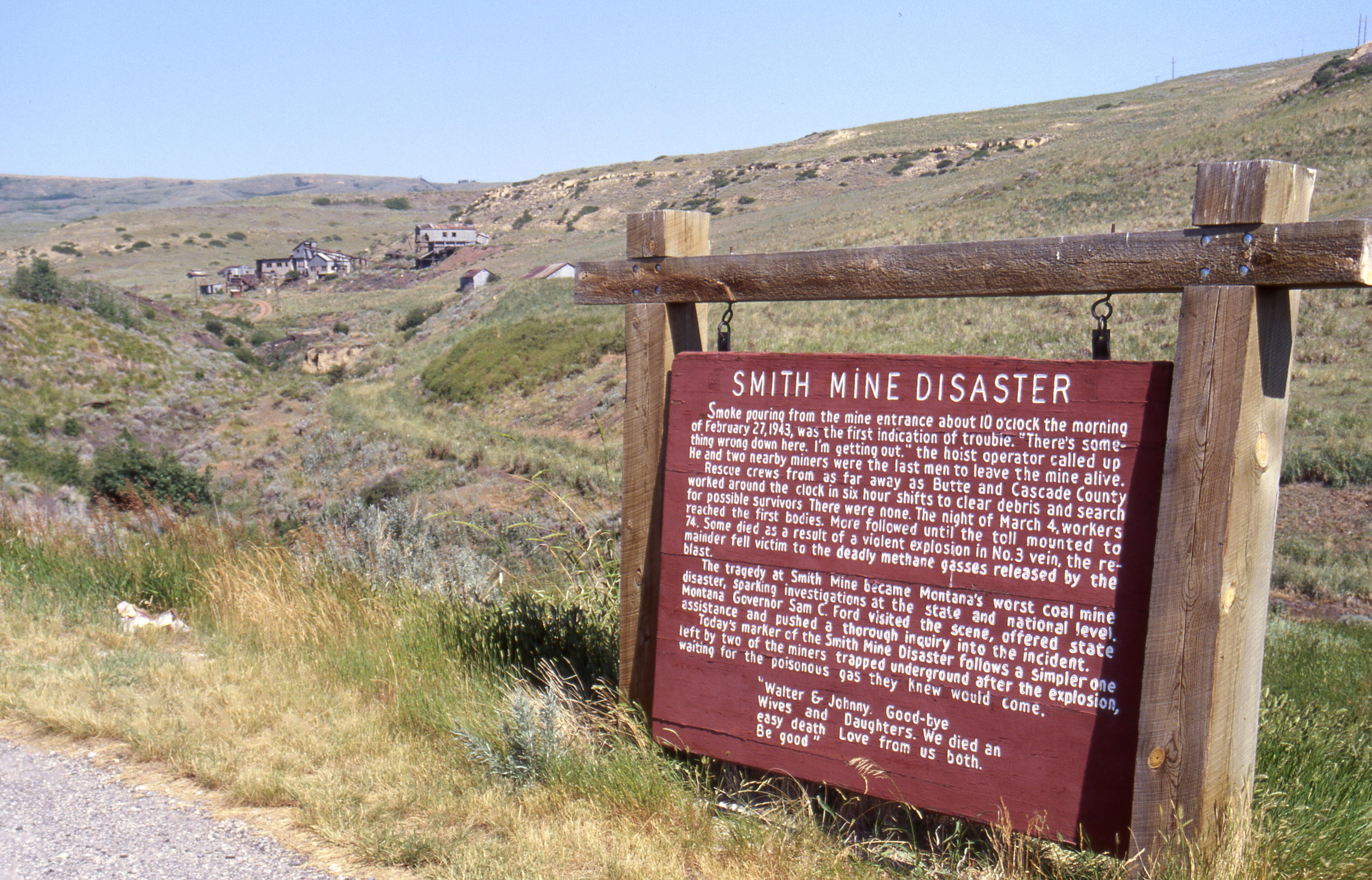
Site of the Smith Mine disaster

In 1943 tragedy hit Smith Mine #3 near Bearcreek, the area's largest remaining mine. An explosion trapped and killed 74 men with only three of the workers in the mine that day escaping, making it the worst coal mine disaster in Montana's history. The mine was shut down shortly thereafter but was reopened in the late 1970s. The Red Lodge cemetery contains a memorial.

The downtown has been redeveloped since the mid-1980s for historic and cultural tourism, as the Red Lodge Commercial Historic District. The buildings in downtown Red Lodge fell into disrepair in large part because population had dropped from its 1915 peak of 6,000 people to about 2,000.

As of 2006, an estimate suggests that the population of Red Lodge may increase from about 1,200 people in the winter to over 1,800 people during the summer tourist season, arriving via the Beartooth Highway.

Red Lodge was heavily affected by the 2022 Montana floods.

In the November 2026 elections the town voted 51% yes "to allow a commercial cultivator marijuana business or grow facility the ability to operate within the city limits".

== Geography ==
Red Lodge is located adjacent to the Beartooth Mountains just to the south. Rock Creek flows along the eastern border. About 30 miles to the southwest of town, in the Custer Gallatin National Forest, is Granite Peak, the highest point in Montana. Grizzly Peak, of the Red Lodge Mountain ski area, is one of several mountains surrounding the town.

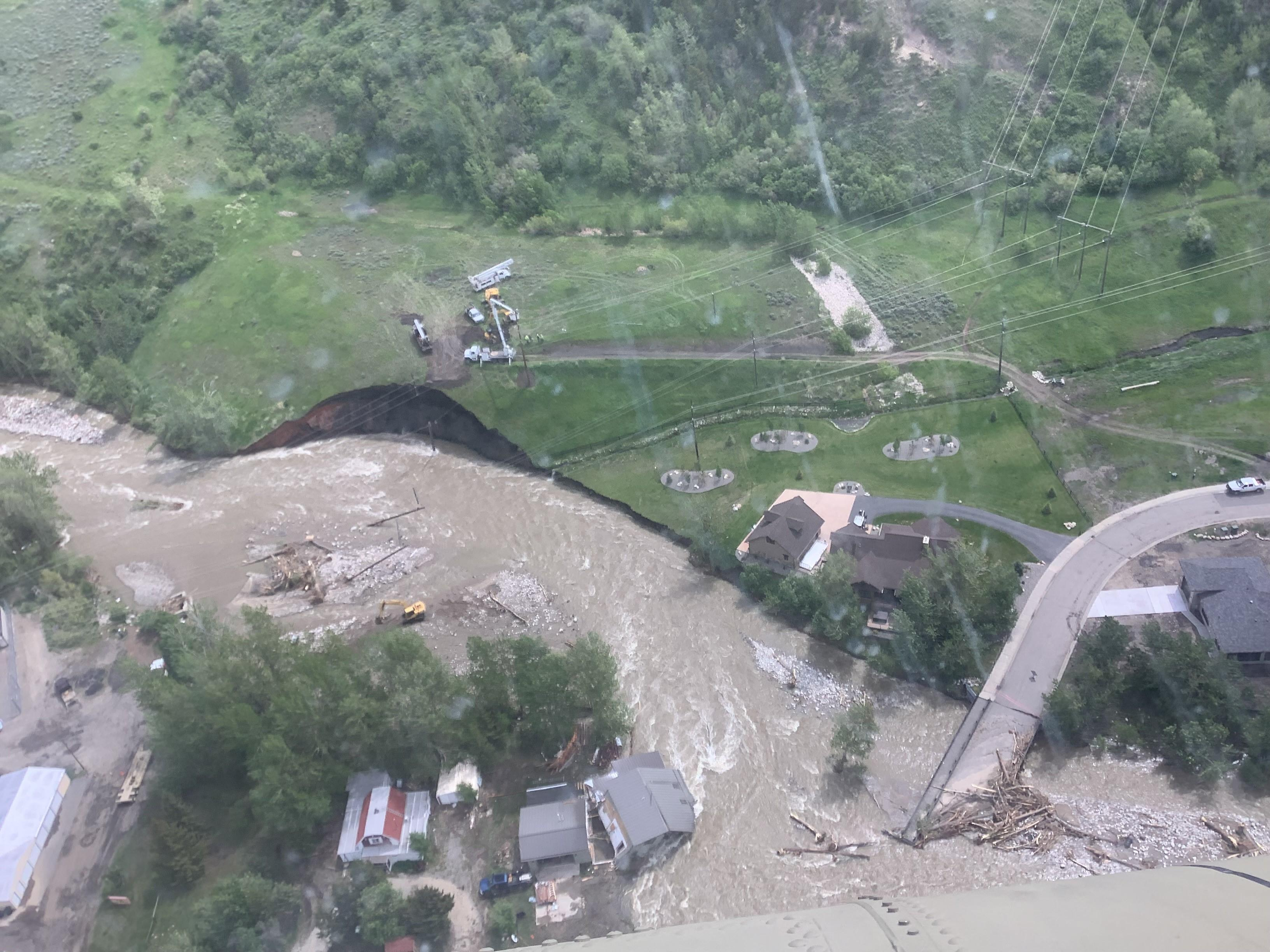
June 14, 2022, flood damage

According to the United States Census Bureau, the city has a total area of 2.80 square miles (7.25 km^{2}), all land.

=== Climate ===
Red Lodge experiences a continental climate (Köppen Dfb) with cold, somewhat dry winters and warm, wetter summers. Summers are cooler than in areas of Montana further north, due to the high elevation. Winters however, are milder than areas further to the east due to the chinook wind influence, as with most of Montana.

Climate data for Red Lodge, Montana, 1991–2020 normals, extremes 1894–present
Month	Jan	Feb	Mar	Apr	May	Jun	Jul	Aug	Sep	Oct	Nov	Dec	Year
Record high °F (°C)	70 (21)	70 (21)	75 (24)	80 (27)	88 (31)	96 (36)	101 (38)	99 (37)	97 (36)	86 (30)	80 (27)	71 (22)	101 (38)
Mean maximum °F (°C)	53.9 (12.2)	54.3 (12.4)	61.6 (16.4)	70.5 (21.4)	77.9 (25.5)	85.2 (29.6)	90.9 (32.7)	90.0 (32.2)	85.5 (29.7)	74.7 (23.7)	61.5 (16.4)	54.6 (12.6)	91.5 (33.1)
Mean daily maximum °F (°C)	37.5 (3.1)	36.7 (2.6)	45.7 (7.6)	53.3 (11.8)	62.0 (16.7)	71.6 (22.0)	81.2 (27.3)	80.6 (27.0)	71.2 (21.8)	56.4 (13.6)	43.1 (6.2)	35.7 (2.1)	56.3 (13.5)
Daily mean °F (°C)	25.7 (−3.5)	25.5 (−3.6)	33.7 (0.9)	40.9 (4.9)	49.3 (9.6)	57.6 (14.2)	65.6 (18.7)	64.7 (18.2)	56.4 (13.6)	43.9 (6.6)	32.1 (0.1)	25.0 (−3.9)	43.4 (6.3)
Mean daily minimum °F (°C)	13.9 (−10.1)	14.3 (−9.8)	21.7 (−5.7)	28.5 (−1.9)	36.6 (2.6)	43.7 (6.5)	49.9 (9.9)	48.7 (9.3)	41.6 (5.3)	31.4 (−0.3)	21.2 (−6.0)	14.2 (−9.9)	30.5 (−0.8)
Mean minimum °F (°C)	−9.9 (−23.3)	−8.7 (−22.6)	−1.5 (−18.6)	12.9 (−10.6)	23.7 (−4.6)	31.2 (−0.4)	40.9 (4.9)	37.5 (3.1)	28.3 (−2.1)	12.4 (−10.9)	−2.3 (−19.1)	−9.7 (−23.2)	−20.4 (−29.1)
Record low °F (°C)	−38 (−39)	−42 (−41)	−30 (−34)	−10 (−23)	7 (−14)	20 (−7)	30 (−1)	22 (−6)	8 (−13)	−13 (−25)	−25 (−32)	−42 (−41)	−42 (−41)
Average precipitation inches (mm)	0.84 (21)	1.14 (29)	1.78 (45)	2.77 (70)	4.72 (120)	2.59 (66)	1.45 (37)	1.01 (26)	1.63 (41)	2.34 (59)	1.39 (35)	1.00 (25)	22.66 (574)
Average snowfall inches (cm)	13.5 (34)	19.4 (49)	20.2 (51)	25.5 (65)	6.2 (16)	0.6 (1.5)	0.0 (0.0)	0.0 (0.0)	2.1 (5.3)	17.0 (43)	18.7 (47)	18.7 (47)	141.9 (358.8)
Average precipitation days (≥ 0.01 in)	4.6	4.8	7.1	9.3	12.1	11.4	9.9	8.1	7.1	6.6	5.7	5.7	92.4
Average snowy days (≥ 0.1 in)	5.1	5.2	6.1	5.5	2.5	0.4	0.0	0.0	0.7	3.1	5.0	5.8	39.4
Source 1: NOAA
Source 2: National Weather Service

== Demographics ==
Historical population
Census	Pop.	Note	%±
1890	624		—
1900	2,152		244.9%
1910	4,860		125.8%
1920	4,515		−7.1%
1930	3,026		−33.0%
1940	2,950		−2.5%
1950	2,730		−7.5%
1960	2,278		−16.6%
1970	1,844		−19.1%
1980	1,896		2.8%
1990	1,958		3.3%
2000	2,177		11.2%
2010	2,125		−2.4%
2020	2,257		6.2%
source: U.S. Decennial Census

Red Lodge is part of the Billings Metropolitan Statistical Area.

=== 2020 census ===
As of the 2020 census, Red Lodge had a population of 2,257. The median age was 49.0 years. 15.1% of residents were under the age of 18 and 26.1% of residents were 65 years of age or older. For every 100 females there were 99.4 males, and for every 100 females age 18 and over there were 97.7 males age 18 and over.

0.0% of residents lived in urban areas, while 100.0% lived in rural areas.

There were 1,135 households in Red Lodge, of which 18.7% had children under the age of 18 living in them. Of all households, 38.3% were married-couple households, 24.4% were households with a male householder and no spouse or partner present, and 30.4% were households with a female householder and no spouse or partner present. About 42.4% of all households were made up of individuals and 16.2% had someone living alone who was 65 years of age or older.

There were 1,689 housing units, of which 32.8% were vacant. The homeowner vacancy rate was 1.3% and the rental vacancy rate was 17.1%.

Racial composition as of the 2020 census
Race	Number	Percent
White	2,062	91.4%
Black or African American	12	0.5%
American Indian and Alaska Native	29	1.3%
Asian	15	0.7%
Native Hawaiian and Other Pacific Islander	0	0.0%
Some other race	15	0.7%
Two or more races	124	5.5%
Hispanic or Latino (of any race)	65	2.9%

=== 2010 census ===
As of the census of 2010, there were 2,125 people, 1,082 households, and 513 families residing in the city. The population density was 758.9 inhabitants per square mile (293.0/km^{2}). There were 1,675 housing units at an average density of 598.2 per square mile (231.0/km^{2}). The racial makeup of the city was 96.3% White, 0.4% African American, 0.6% Native American, 0.3% Asian, 0.1% Pacific Islander, 0.6% from other races, and 1.6% from two or more races. Hispanic or Latino of any race were 1.9% of the population.

There were 1,082 households, of which 19.5% had children under the age of 18 living with them, 35.6% were married couples living together, 8.2% had a female householder with no husband present, 3.6% had a male householder with no wife present, and 52.6% were non-families. 43.8% of all households were made up of individuals, and 14.4% had someone living alone who was 65 years of age or older. The average household size was 1.92 and the average family size was 2.62.

The median age in the city was 47.3 years. 16.8% of residents were under the age of 18; 6.4% were between the ages of 18 and 24; 22.8% were from 25 to 44; 34.4% were from 45 to 64; and 19.8% were 65 years of age or older. The gender makeup of the city was 49.4% male and 50.6% female.

=== 2000 census ===
As of the census of 2000, there were 2,177 people, 1,020 households, and 528 families residing in the city. The population density was 846.0 inhabitants per square mile (326.6/km^{2}). There were 1,415 housing units at an average density of 549.9 per square mile (212.3/km^{2}). The racial makeup of the city was 96.14% White, 0.41% African American, 1.10% Native American, 0.46% Asian, 0.46% from other races, and 1.42% from two or more races. Hispanic or Latino of any race were 1.98% of the population.

There were 1,020 households, out of which 22.8% had children under the age of 18 living with them, 41.3% were married couples living together, 7.3% had a female householder with no husband present, and 48.2% were non-families. 39.8% of all households were made up of individuals, and 15.0% had someone living alone who was 65 years of age or older. The average household size was 2.04 and the average family size was 2.76.

In the city, the population was spread out, with 20.2% under the age of 18, 6.9% from 18 to 24, 28.6% from 25 to 44, 24.9% from 45 to 64, and 19.4% who were 65 years of age or older. The median age was 42 years. For every 100 females, there were 93.5 males. For every 100 females age 18 and over, there were 88.9 males.

The median income for a household in the city was $31,750, and the median income for a family was $40,260. Males had a median income of $30,250 versus $20,208 for females. The per capita income for the city was $19,090. About 6.9% of families and 9.7% of the population were below the poverty line, including 12.4% of those under age 18 and 9.3% of those age 65 or over.

== Government ==
Red Lodge is an incorporated city. It operates on a Charter Form of Government. There are six members of the city council, elected from one of three wards of roughly equal population. There are two council members from each ward. The mayor is elected in a citywide vote and serves 2 years.

== Education ==
Red Lodge is served by three public schools: Mountain View Elementary School, Roosevelt Middle School, and Red Lodge High School. For the 2021-2022 school year, there were 319 students enrolled in kindergarten to 8th grade. The high school, 9th to 12th grade, had 180 students. The team name for Red Lodge schools is the Rams.

Red Lodge Carnegie Library serves the area.

The Yellowstone Bighorn Research Association's Geology Field Station is located south of Red Lodge.

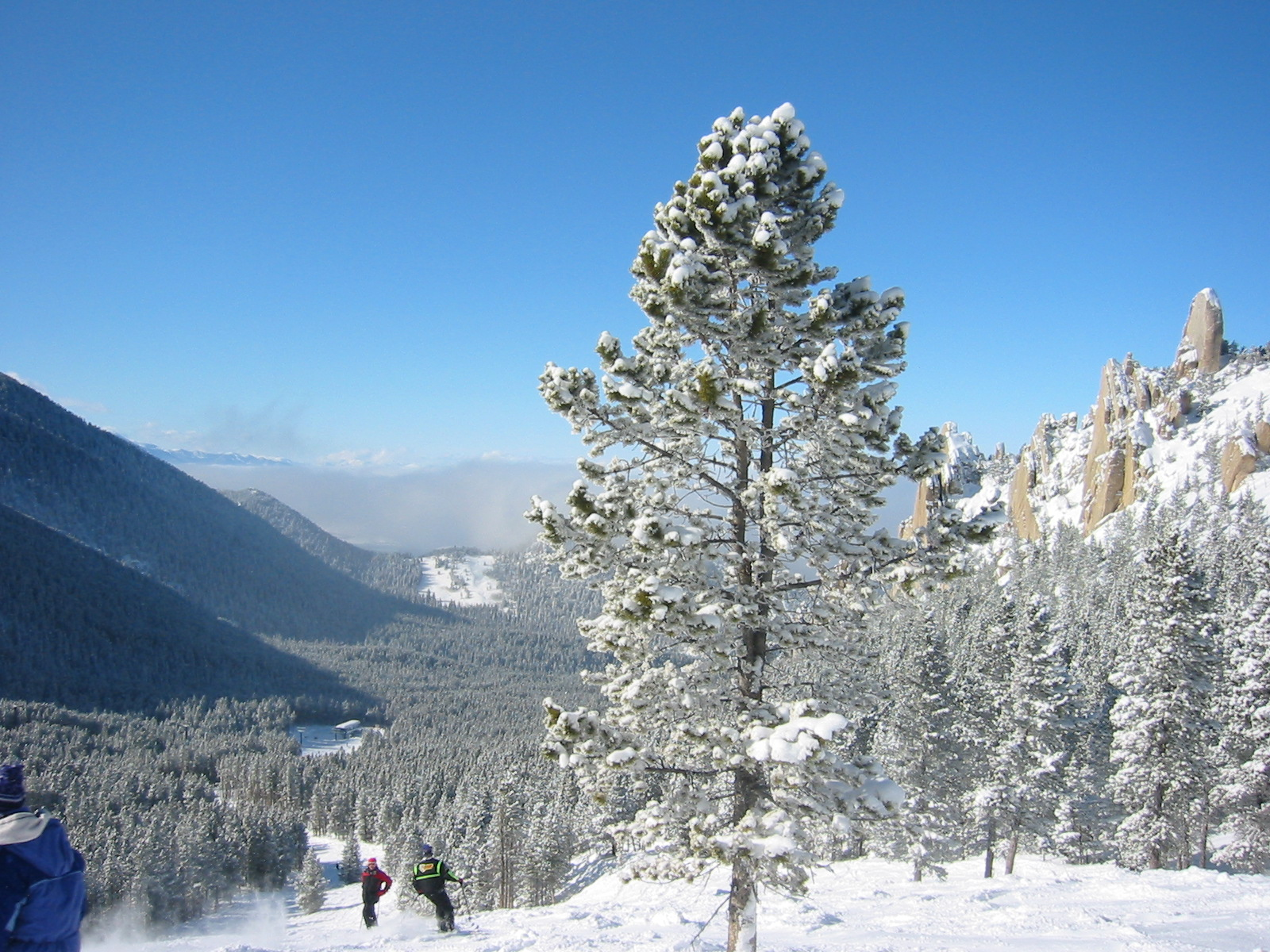
Red Lodge Mountain Palisades

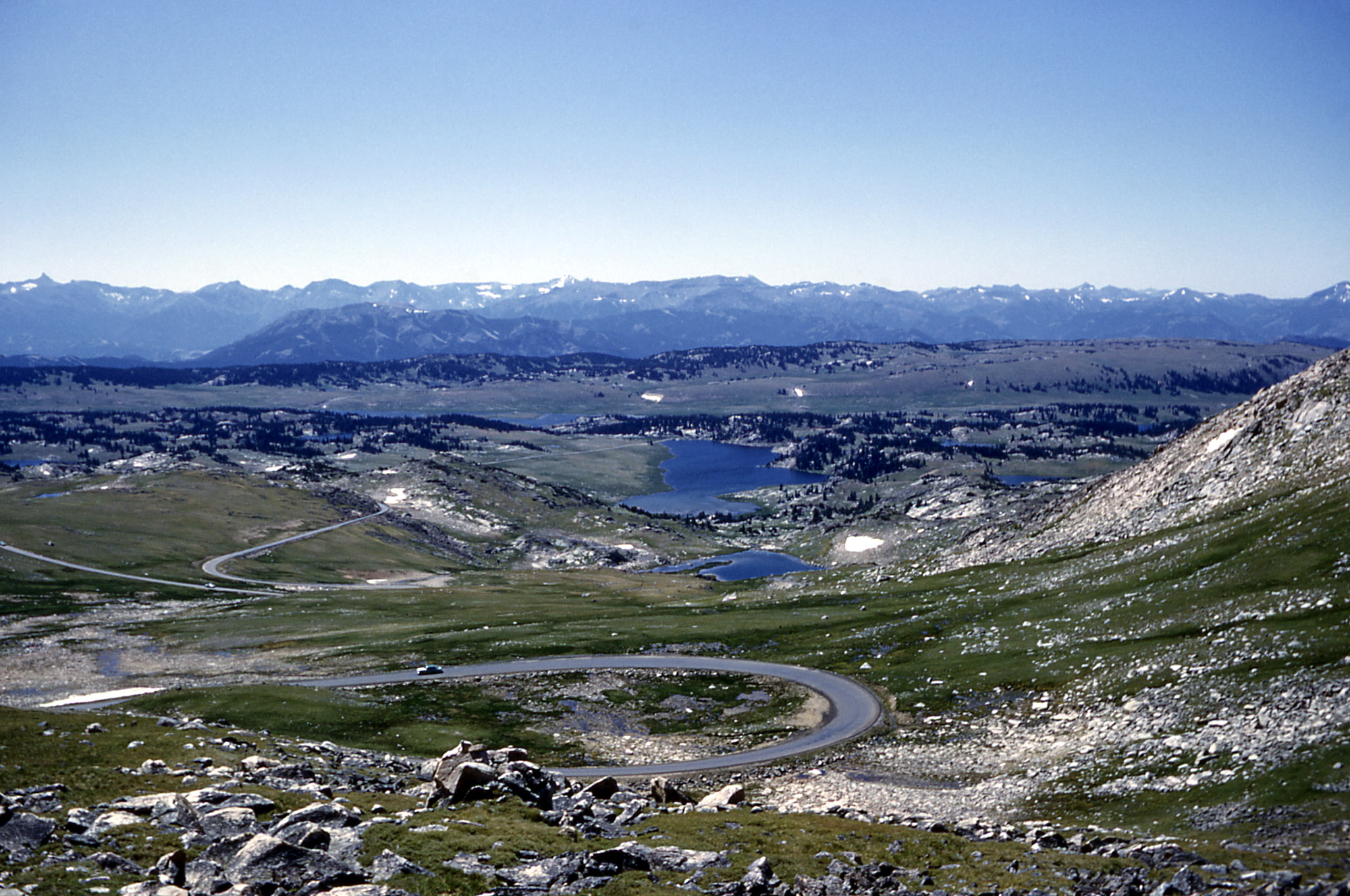
The Beartooth Highway in the Beartooth Mountains

== Outdoor recreation ==
Red Lodge is well known for many outdoor recreation opportunities: skiing, mountain biking, fly fishing, and backpacking are nearby. They are home to the national skijoring finals.

== Infrastructure ==
U.S. Route 212 runs through the town from north to south. South of town it becomes Beartooth Highway, a National Scenic Byway. Montana Highway 78 enters west of town from Columbus to the north. Secondary Highway 308 connects the town east to Belfry.

Red Lodge Airport is a public use airport located adjacently on the (1.85 km) westside of town. The nearest commercial airport is Billings Logan International Airport.

The Beartooth Billings Clinic provides medical care for the area. Services include emergency, same-day care, mental health and primary care.

== Media ==
=== Radio ===
- KMXE FM 99.3

=== Newspapers ===
- Carbon County News (Weekly)
- The Local Rag (1991-2019)
- Red Lodge Pickett (1892-1922)

== Notable people ==
- Doug Brown, long-distance runner
- Brady Canfield, Bronze medal winner in the 2003 FIBT World Championships in skeleton racing
- Kim Gillan, former Montana State Senator and 2012 candidate for the U.S. House of Representatives
- John Johnston was elected the first marshal in Red Lodge in 1888.
- Laurie Niemi, Washington Redskins offensive tackle
- Alice Greenough Orr, internationally renowned rodeo performer
- Gary D. Robson, author and closed captioning innovator
- Emily E. Sloan, lawyer and author
- K. Ross Toole, Montana historian
