= Belfry, Montana =

- Census-designated place
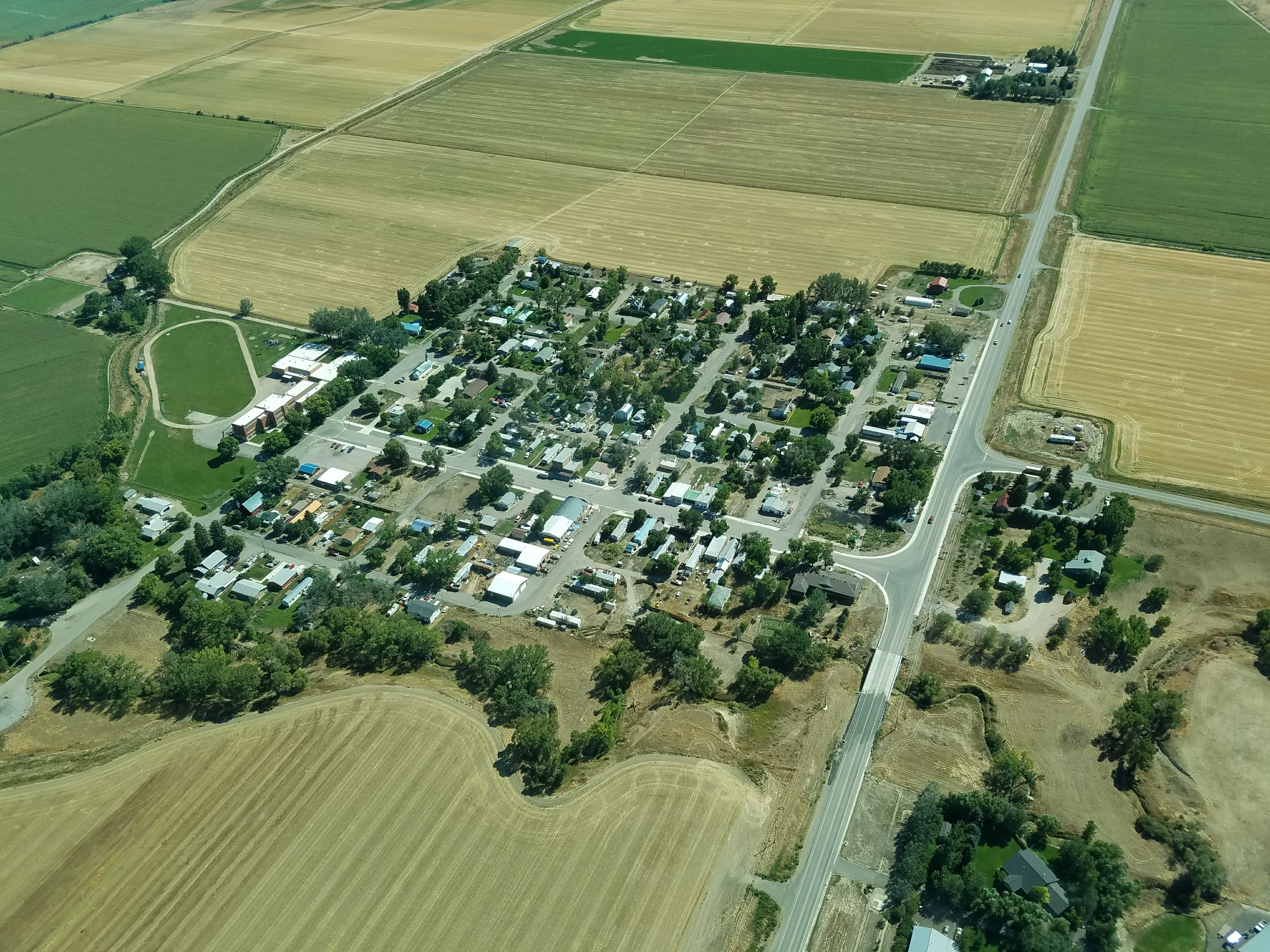
- Aerial view of Belfry

- Location of Belfry, Montana
- Coordinates: 45°08′05″N 109°00′12″W
- Country: United States
- State: Montana
- County: Carbon

Area
  - Total: 1.72 sq mi (4.45 km^{2})
  - Land: 1.66 sq mi (4.31 km^{2})
  - Water: 0.054 sq mi (0.14 km^{2})
- Elevation: 3,845 ft (1,172 m)

Population (2020)
  - Total: 193
  - Density: 115.9/sq mi (44.76/km^{2})
- Time zone: UTC-7 (Mountain (MST))
  - Summer (DST): UTC-6 (MDT)
- ZIP code: 59008
- Area code: 406
- FIPS code: 30-04900
- GNIS feature ID: 2407824

Belfry is a census-designated place (CDP) in Carbon County, Montana, United States. It is an unincorporated town, and is part of the Billings, Montana Metropolitan Statistical Area. The population was 193 at the 2020 census, down from 218 in the 2010 census. It is located approximately 11 miles (18 km) from the Wyoming border, roughly halfway between Billings, Montana and Cody, Wyoming.

Belfry is predominantly an agricultural community. The primary crops are sugar beets, alfalfa, and feed corn. Ranchers raise cattle and sheep. Water for agricultural use comes mostly from the Clarks Fork of the Yellowstone River through several cooperative ditch companies, with water rights dating back 100 years or more.

The town was created by the construction of the Yellowstone Park Railroad in 1905. The line, known as Montana, Wyoming & Southern Railroad beginning in 1909, was a short line between Bridger and the coal mines. The town was named for Dr. Oran Merton Belfry, an investor in the railroad. The post office was established on February 26, 1906, with Mary Hall as the first postmaster.

Belfry was the headquarters of the railroad and anchored the business district. With demand for coal down, the railroad went bankrupt in 1954. The Depot was listed on the National Register of Historic Places in 2012.

Kose Hall is also listed on the Register. The building has functioned as a dance hall, restaurant, and general store.

== Geography ==
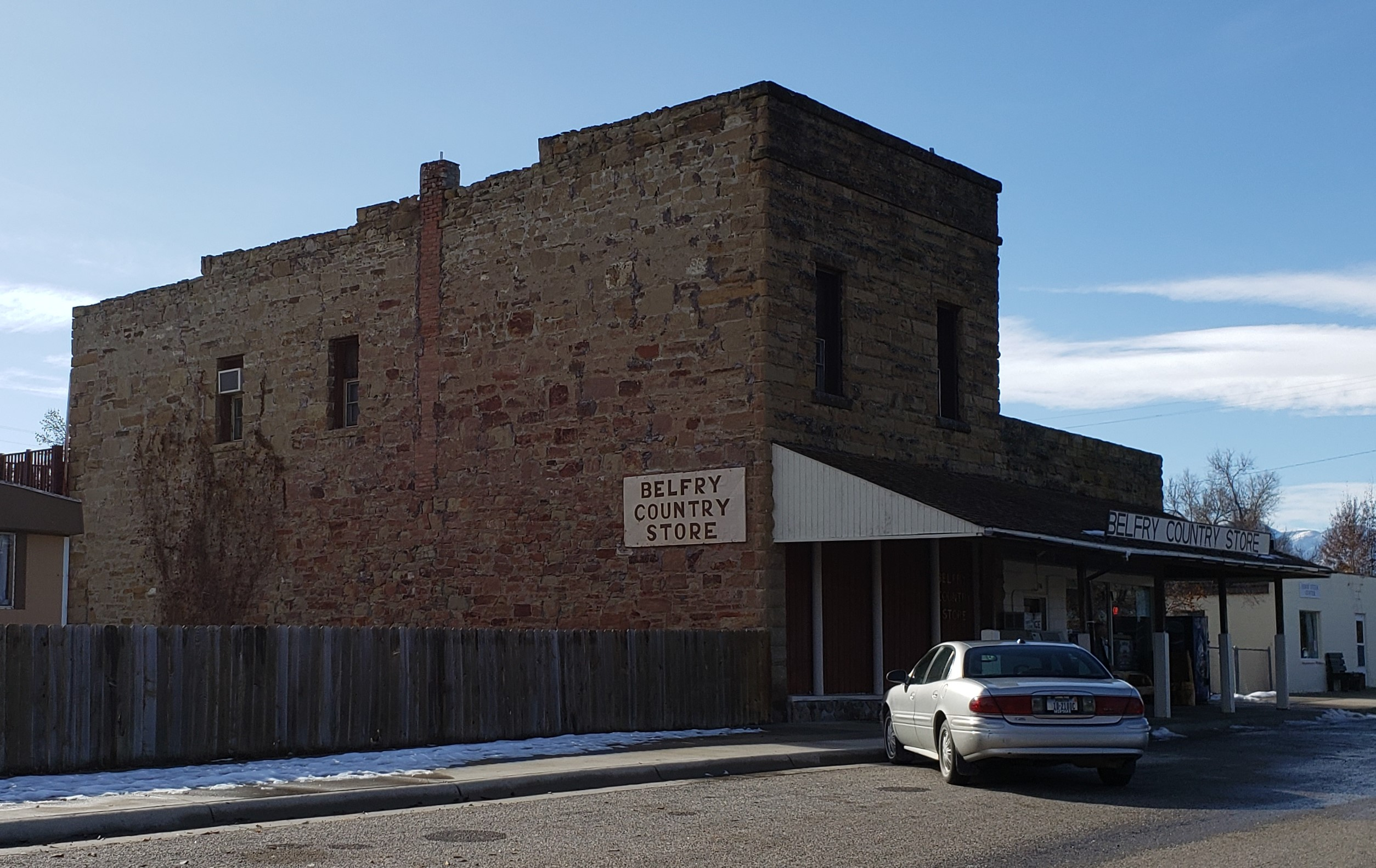
Kose Hall

Belfry is located in south-central Carbon County.

According to the United States Census Bureau, the CDP has a total area of 1.72 square miles (4.45 km^{2}), of which 1.66 square miles (4.31 km^{2}) is land and 0.054 square miles (0.14 km^{2}), or 3.10%, is water. The Clarks Fork of the Yellowstone River runs just east of the main part of the town.

== Demographics ==
Historical population
Census	Pop.	Note	%±
2020	193		—
U.S. Decennial Census

As of the census of 2000, there were 219 people, 98 households, and 53 families residing in the CDP. The population density was 115.1 inhabitants per square mile (44.4/km^{2}). There were 119 housing units at an average density of 62.5 per square mile (24.1/km^{2}). The racial makeup of the CDP was 98.63% White, 0.91% Native American, and 0.46% from two or more races. Hispanic or Latino of any race were 1.83% of the population.

There were 98 households, out of which 29.6% had children under the age of 18 living with them, 45.9% were married couples living together, 8.2% had a female householder with no husband present, and 44.9% were non-families. 41.8% of all households were made up of individuals, and 16.3% had someone living alone who was 65 years of age or older. The average household size was 2.23 and the average family size was 3.17.

In the CDP, the population was spread out, with 27.4% under the age of 18, 6.8% from 18 to 24, 21.5% from 25 to 44, 23.3% from 45 to 64, and 21.0% who were 65 years of age or older. The median age was 41 years. For every 100 females, there were 95.5 males. For every 100 females age 18 and over, there were 87.1 males.

The median income for a household in the CDP was $25,313, and the median income for a family was $43,750. Males had a median income of $16,667 versus $15,500 for females. The per capita income for the CDP was $13,186. About 16.3% of families and 20.3% of the population were below the poverty line, including 15.1% of those under the age of eighteen and 11.6% of those 65 or over.

== Schools ==
Belfry has its own school district, comprising two schools (elementary and high school) in adjoining buildings. In the 2024-2025 school year 51 students attended Belfry schools, including children from Bearcreek, Montana, Bridger, Montana, and Clark, Wyoming. The school mascot is the bat, and the sports teams are known as the Belfry Bats.

== Infrastructure ==
Belfry is near public use airports Bridger Municipal Airport and Red Lodge Airport. The nearest commercial airport is Billings Logan International Airport.
