= Smith Mine disaster =

1943 coal mine explosion in Montana, US

Coordinates: 45°09′36″N 109°11′32″W

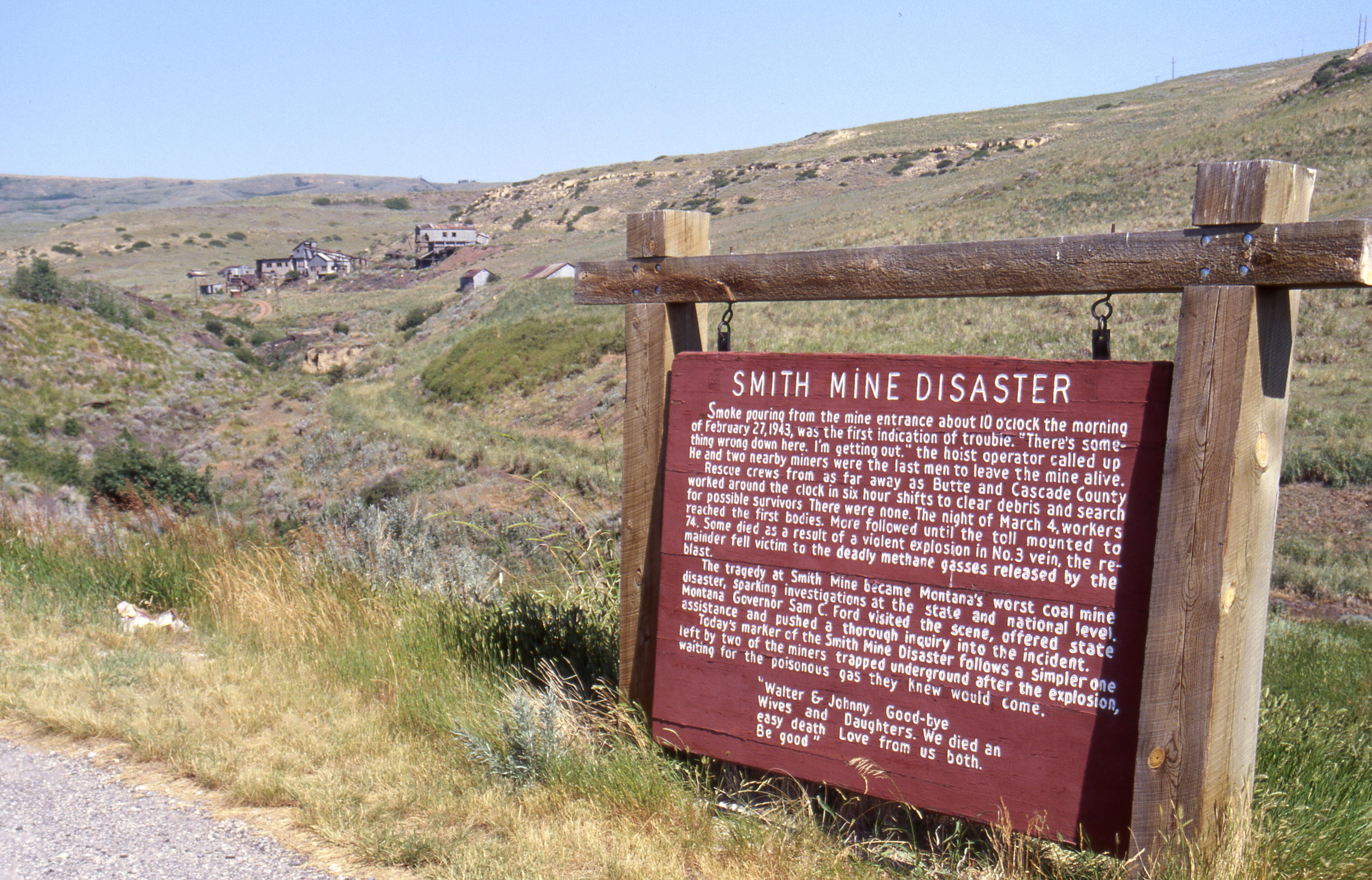
Site of the Smith Mine disaster

Memorial of the Smith Mine disaster

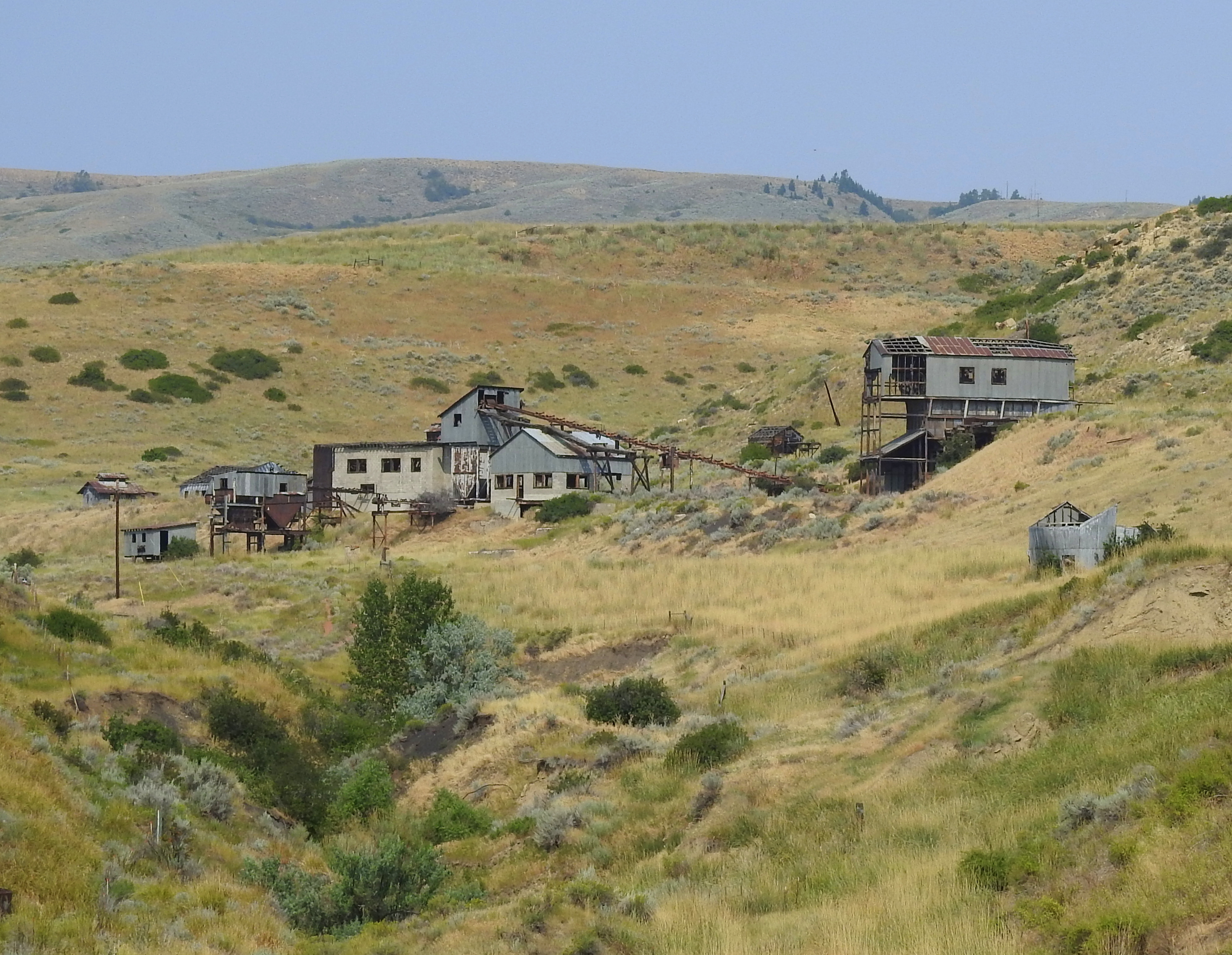
Smith Mine, Bearcreek, Carbon County, Montana

The Smith Mine disaster was the worst coal mining disaster in the U.S. state of Montana, and the 43rd worst in the United States, according to the National Institute for Occupational Safety and Health (NIOSH).

On February 27, 1943, at approximately 9:37 a.m., an explosion ripped through Smith Mine No. 3, a coal mine located between the towns of Bearcreek and Washoe. Since it was a Saturday, only a limited crew was in the mine. Of the 77 men working that day, only three got out of the mine alive, and one of the rescue workers died soon afterward. The report from the United States Bureau of Mines states that 30 men were killed instantly in the explosion, while the others died either because of injuries sustained in the explosion or because of suffocation from the carbon monoxide and methane gas in the mine. The explosion was deep underground and was not heard at the mouth of the mine, despite having enough power to knock a 20-ton locomotive off its tracks, 0.25 mile (0.4 km) from the blast origin.

All the bodies were eventually removed from the mine. There is a highway plaque near the mouth of the mine, which was never reopened. Additionally, memorials can be found in the cemeteries in Bearcreek and nearby Red Lodge, which serves as the county seat of Carbon County.

The explosion was attributed to a build-up of methane gas in the mine. While the cause of detonation is unknown, various reports note that men were allowed to smoke inside the mine and that fuses for blasting were lit with matches.

The site of the disaster is included in the Smith Mine Historic District, listed on the National Register of Historic Places in 2009.

== See also ==
- Argonaut Mine
- Monongah mining disaster
- Coal mining disasters in United States
- Treadwell Gold Mine
