= Red Lodge Airport =

Airport in Montana, United States

- IATA: none; ICAO: KRED; FAA LID: RED

Summary
- Airport type: Public
- Owner: City of Red Lodge & Carbon County
- Serves: Red Lodge, Montana
- Elevation AMSL: 5,763 ft (1,757 m)
- Coordinates: 45°11′10″N 109°15′28″W
- Interactive map of Red Lodge Airport

Runways
Direction	Length		Surface
Direction	ft	m	Surface
16/34	4,000	1,219	Asphalt

Statistics (2005)
- Aircraft operations: 8,050
- Based aircraft: 14
- Source: Federal Aviation Administration

Red Lodge Airport (ICAO: KRED, FAA LID: RED) is a public use airport located one nautical mile (1.85 km) northwest of the central business district of Red Lodge, a city in Carbon County, Montana, United States. It is owned by the City of Red Lodge and Carbon County. According to the FAA's National Plan of Integrated Airport Systems for 2009–2013, it is categorized as a general aviation airport.

Although many U.S. airports use the same three-letter location identifier for the FAA and IATA, this airport is assigned RED by the FAA but has no designation from the IATA (which assigned RED to Mifflin County Airport in Reedsville, Pennsylvania).

== Facilities and aircraft ==
Red Lodge Airport covers an area of 212 acres (86 ha) at an elevation of 5,763 feet (1,757 m) above mean sea level. It has one runway designated 16/34 with an asphalt surface measuring 4,000 by 75 feet (1,219 x 23 m).

For the 12-month period ending September 20, 2005, the airport had 8,050 aircraft operations, an average of 22 per day: 97% general aviation, 3% air taxi, and <1% military. At that time there were 14 aircraft based at this airport: 86% single-engine and 14% multi-engine.

== See also ==
- List of airports in Montana
