= Montaqua, Montana =

Community in Montana, United States

- Census-designated place
- Location within Montana Location within the United States
- Coordinates: 45°30′14″N 108°54′51″W
- Country: United States
- State: Montana
- County: Carbon

Area
  - Total: 1.41 sq mi (3.65 km^{2})
  - Land: 1.41 sq mi (3.65 km^{2})
  - Water: 0 sq mi (0.00 km^{2})
- Elevation: 3,593 ft (1,095 m)

Population (2020)
  - Total: 120
  - Density: 85.2/sq mi (32.91/km^{2})
- Time zone: UTC-7 (Mountain (MST))
  - Summer (DST): UTC-6 (MDT)
- ZIP Code: 59041 (Joliet)
- Area code: 406
- FIPS code: 30-51475
- GNIS feature ID: 2804696

Montaqua is a census-designated place (CDP) in Carbon County, Montana, United States. As of the 2020 census, Montaqua had a population of 120. It is in the northern part of the county, along U.S. Route 212, which leads northeast 15 miles (24 km) to Laurel and southwest 30 miles (48 km) to Red Lodge. Montaqua is on the north side of Rock Creek, a northeast-flowing tributary of the Clarks Fork Yellowstone River. The community is bordered to the northeast by Rockvale.

Montaqua was first listed as a CDP prior to the 2020 census.

== Demographics ==
Historical population
Census	Pop.	Note	%±
2020	120		—
U.S. Decennial Census
