= Rock Creek (Clarks Fork Yellowstone River tributary) =

River in Montana and Wyoming, United States

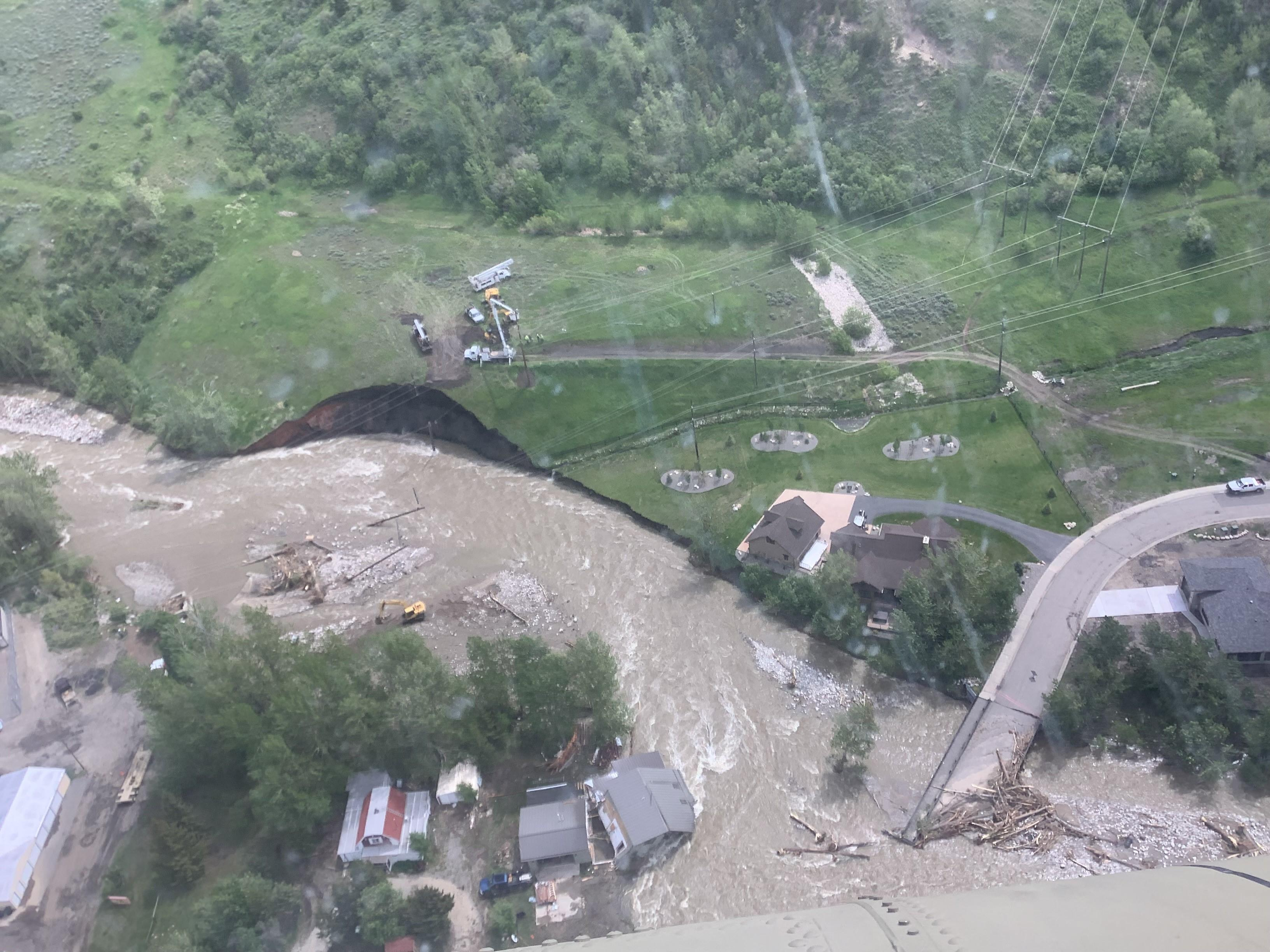
- Rock Creek flooding in 2022 near Red Lodge

- Location of the river's mouth in Montana Rock Creek (Clarks Fork Yellowstone River tributary) (the United States)

Location
- Country: United States
- States: Montana; Wyoming

Physical characteristics
- Source: Glacier Lake
  - coordinates: 45.0054°N 109.5328°W
- Mouth: Clarks Fork Yellowstone River
  - location: Carbon County
  - coordinates: 45.5273°N 108.8228°W

Basin features
- Progression: Clarks Fork Yellowstone River; Yellowstone River; Missouri River; Mississippi River
- River system: Missouri River
- Tributaries
  - left: Hellroaring Creek; Lake Fork; Snow Creek; West Rock Creek
  - right: Chain Creek; Wyoming Creek; Clear Creek
- Bridges: Joliet Bridge; Rock Creek Bridge

Rock Creek is a river in the U.S. states of Montana and Wyoming. It is a tributary of the Clarks Fork Yellowstone River in the Missouri River drainage basin.

Rock Creek flows from Glacier Lake, travels south into Wyoming before turning north back into Montana. It flows through the city of Red Lodge before entering the Clarks Fork Yellowstone River. When Rock Creek flooded in 2022, it caused significant damage to parts of Red Lodge.

Communities along the course of Rock Creek include Rockvale, Montaqua, Joliet, Roberts, and Red Lodge. U.S. Route 212 follows the river for most of its length.

== See also ==
- List of rivers of Wyoming
- List of rivers of Montana
- List of tributaries of the Mississippi River
- Rock Creek (Saskatchewan–Montana), a tributary of Milk River
- Rock Creek (Clark Fork River tributary), a tributary of Clark Fork River
