= Edgar, Montana =

Unincorporated community in Montana, United States

- Census-designated place
- Location within Montana Location within the United States
- Coordinates: 45°27′49″N 108°51′19″W
- Country: United States
- State: Montana
- County: Carbon

Area
  - Total: 0.69 sq mi (1.79 km^{2})
  - Land: 0.68 sq mi (1.76 km^{2})
  - Water: 0.012 sq mi (0.03 km^{2})
- Elevation: 3,471 ft (1,058 m)

Population (2020)
  - Total: 110
  - Density: 161.8/sq mi (62.49/km^{2})
- Time zone: UTC-7 (Mountain (MST))
  - Summer (DST): UTC-6 (MDT)
- ZIP code: 59026
- Area code: 406
- GNIS feature ID: 2583805

Edgar is a census-designated place and unincorporated community in Carbon County, Montana, United States. As of the 2020 census, Edgar had a population of 110. Edgar has a post office with a ZIP code 59026. The post office was established May 28, 1909 with John J. Thornton as its first postmaster. Thornton named the town after his brother.

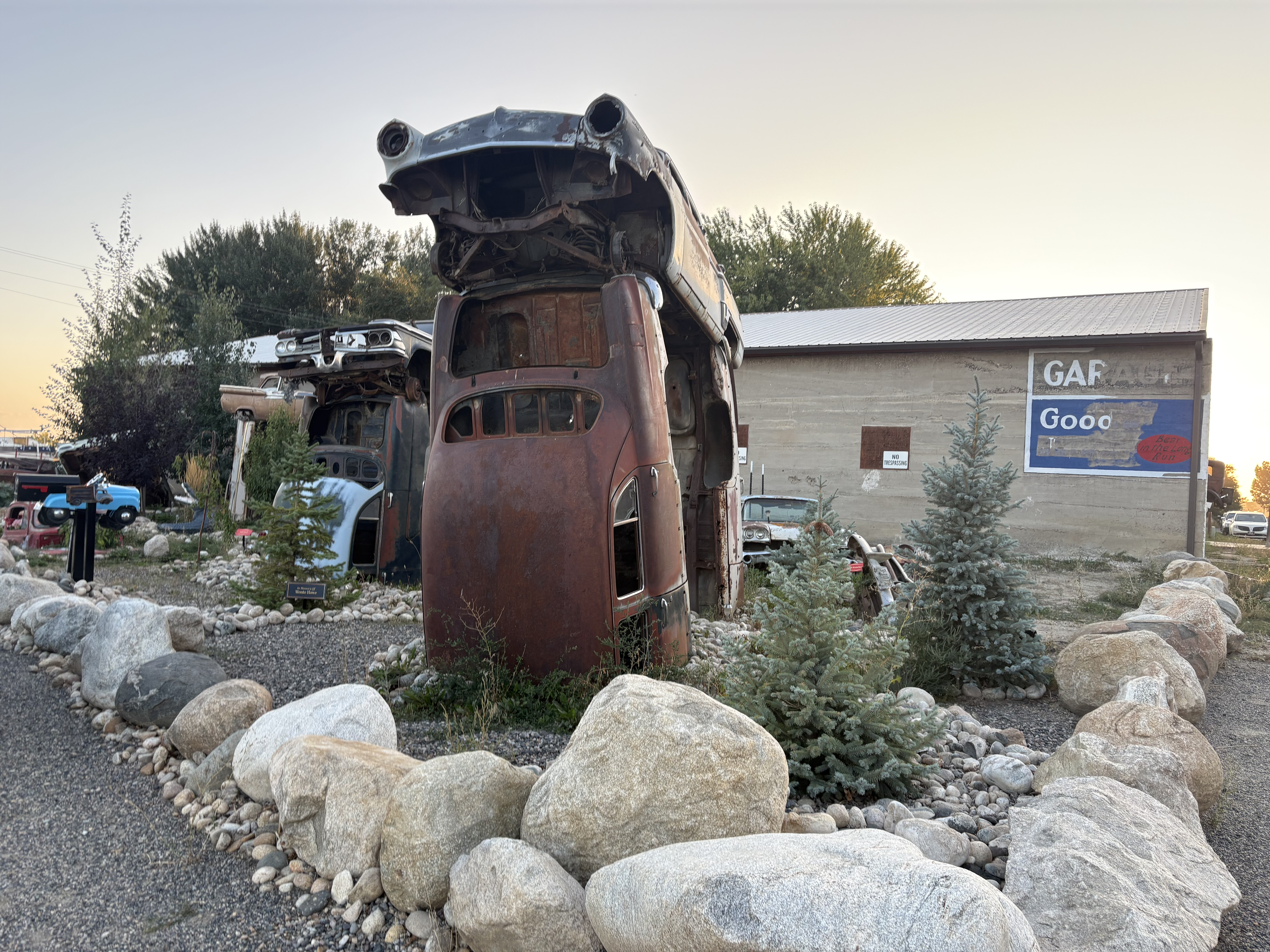
Fordhedge in Edgar

Edgar lies east of the intersection of U.S. Route 310 and Elwell Street. Edgar is south of Rockvale and northeast of Fromberg. Edgar is a small, agricultural community with a number of silos and elevators.

== Demographics ==
Historical population
| Census | Pop. | Note | %± |
|---|---|---|---|
| 2020 | 110 | | — |
U.S. Decennial Census
