= Boyd, Montana =

Unincorporated community in Montana, United States

- Census-designated place
- Location within Montana Location within the United States
- Coordinates: 45°27′15″N 109°04′11″W
- Country: United States
- State: Montana
- County: Carbon

Area
  - Total: 0.27 sq mi (0.71 km^{2})
  - Land: 0.27 sq mi (0.71 km^{2})
  - Water: 0 sq mi (0.00 km^{2})
- Elevation: 4,068 ft (1,240 m)

Population (2020)
  - Total: 19
  - Density: 69.1/sq mi (26.69/km^{2})
- Time zone: UTC-7 (Mountain (MST))
  - Summer (DST): UTC-6 (MDT)
- ZIP code: 59013
- Area code: 406
- GNIS feature ID: 2583791

Boyd is a census-designated place and unincorporated community in Carbon County, Montana, United States. As of the 2020 census, Boyd had a population of 19. Boyd was a stop on the Northern Pacific Railway en route to Red Lodge. A post office was first established at Boyd on March 12, 1909, with Roland N. Doughty as the town's first postmaster. Since December 3, 1965, the office has operated as a rural station or a CPO of Roberts with the ZIP code of 59013.

As a station for the Northern Pacific Railway, Boyd prospered. Once travel by automobile became common, the town's economy declined.

Situated on U.S. Route 212, Boyd is about 21 miles from Red Lodge. The turnoff to Cooney Reservoir is in town.

== Demographics ==
Historical population
Census	Pop.	Note	%±
2020	19		—
U.S. Decennial Census
