= Fox, Montana =

Unincorporated community in Montana, United States

- Unincorporated community
- Location within Montana Location within the United States
- Coordinates: 45°17′18″N 109°12′45″W
- Country: United States
- State: Montana
- County: Carbon

Area
  - Total: 2.94 sq mi (7.61 km^{2})
  - Land: 2.94 sq mi (7.61 km^{2})
  - Water: 0 sq mi (0.00 km^{2})
- Elevation: 4,964 ft (1,513 m)

Population (2020)
  - Total: 100
  - Density: 34.0/sq mi (13.14/km^{2})
- Time zone: UTC-7 (Mountain (MST))
  - Summer (DST): UTC-6 (MDT)
- ZIP code: 59070
- Area code: 406
- GNIS feature ID: 2804692

Fox is an unincorporated community in Carbon County, Montana, United States. It was named for Dr. J.M. Fox, first manager of the Rocky Fork Coal Company and the Rocky Fork & Cooke City Railroad.

At one time, Fox had two grain elevators and was the largest grain shipping point in Carbon County. Finnish immigrant miners settled here, and as late as 1920 their children still spoke Finnish at home and on the playground, and English only in the classroom.

Fox was an important stop on the Northern Pacific Railway to Red Lodge.

Fox has a post office with a ZIP code 59070. It lies on U.S. Route 212, southwest of Roberts and northeast of Red Lodge.

== Demographics ==
Historical population
Census	Pop.	Note	%±
2020	100		—
U.S. Decennial Census
