= Luther, Montana =

Unincorporated community in Montana, United States

- Unincorporated community
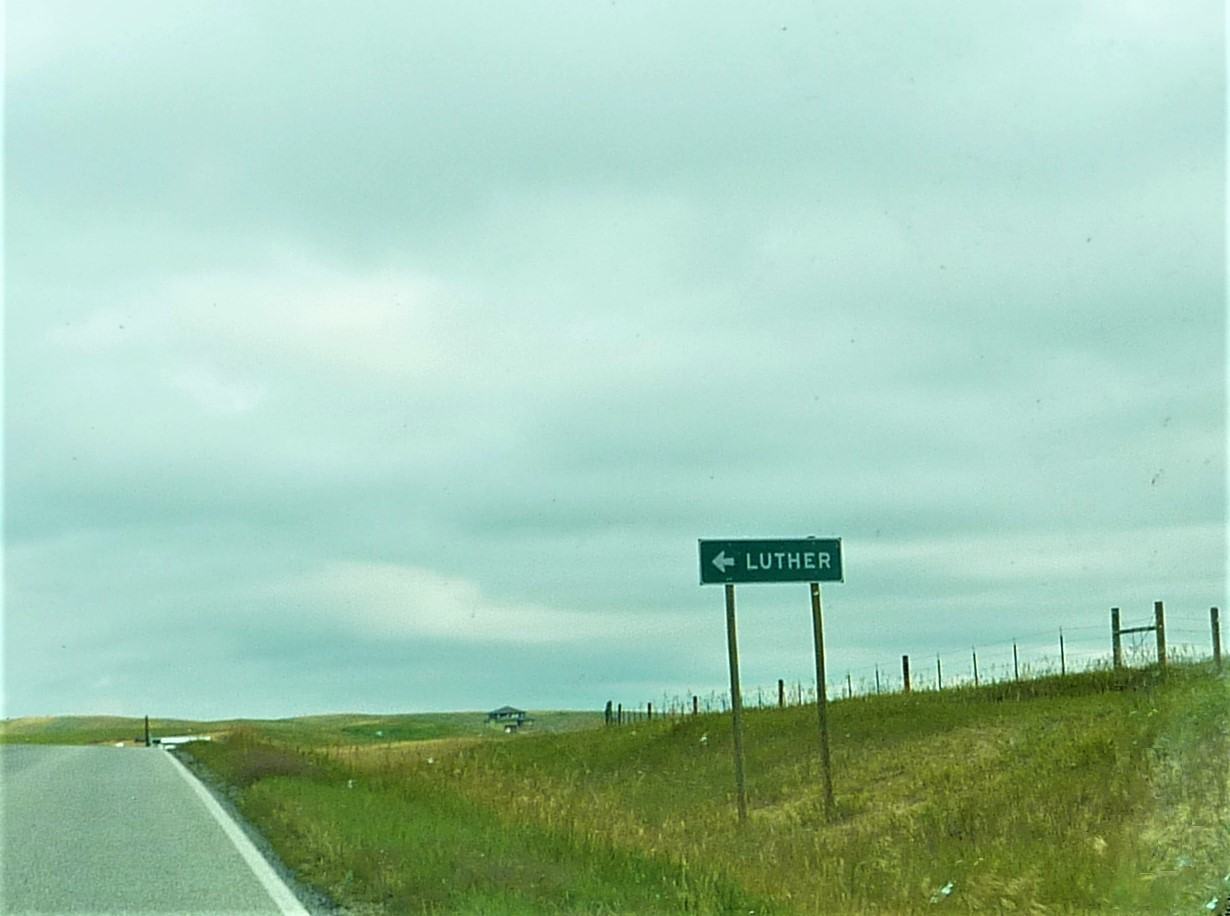

- Location within Montana Location within the United States
- Coordinates: 45°17′06″N 109°24′58″W
- Country: United States
- State: Montana
- County: Carbon

Area
  - Total: 0.57 sq mi (1.48 km^{2})
  - Land: 0.57 sq mi (1.48 km^{2})
  - Water: 0 sq mi (0.00 km^{2})
- Elevation: 5,135 ft (1,565 m)

Population (2020)
  - Total: 30
  - Density: 52.6/sq mi (20.32/km^{2})
- Time zone: UTC-7 (Mountain (MST))
  - Summer (DST): UTC-6 (MDT)
- ZIP code: 59068
- Area code: 406
- GNIS feature ID: 2804694

Luther is an unincorporated community in Carbon County, Montana, United States. Luther lies on Montana Highway 78, southeast of Roscoe and northwest of Red Lodge.

As of the 2020 census, Luther had a population of 30.

Luther was originally called Linley. Its first post office was established on March 12, 1902, with Walter R. Linley as the postmaster, and a ZIP code of 59068. The name was officially changed to "Luther" on March 4, 1907, with Grace R. Luther named as postmaster. On July 22, 1983, the post office was closed, and Luther is now serviced out of Red Lodge.

== Demographics ==
Historical population
Census	Pop.	Note	%±
2020	30		—
U.S. Decennial Census
