= Baker and Lovering Store =

- U.S. National Register of Historic Places
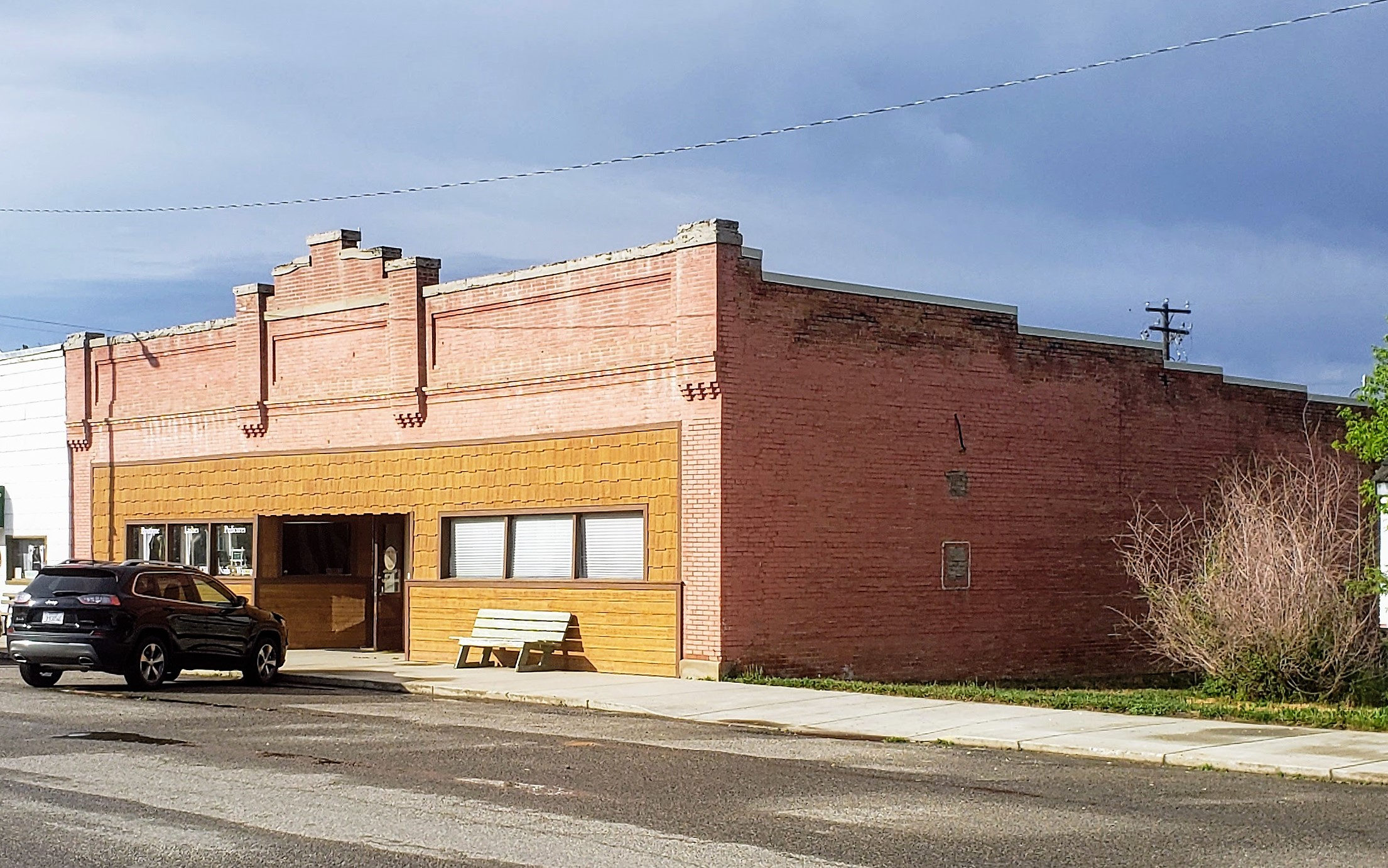

- Location within Montana Location within the United States
- Location: Main St., Joliet, Montana
- Coordinates: 45°29′6″N 108°58′10″W
- Area: less than one acre
- Built: 1902
- Built by: Goss & Lancaster; Patsy Lothus for 1910 addition
- Architect: original build unknown; Curtis C. Oehme for 1910 addition
- MPS: Joliet Montana MRA
- NRHP reference No.: 86000885
- Added to NRHP: May 2, 1986

Baker and Lovering Store is a site on the National Register of Historic Places located in Joliet, Montana. It was added to the Register on May 2, 1986. It was also known as Lovering and Smith.

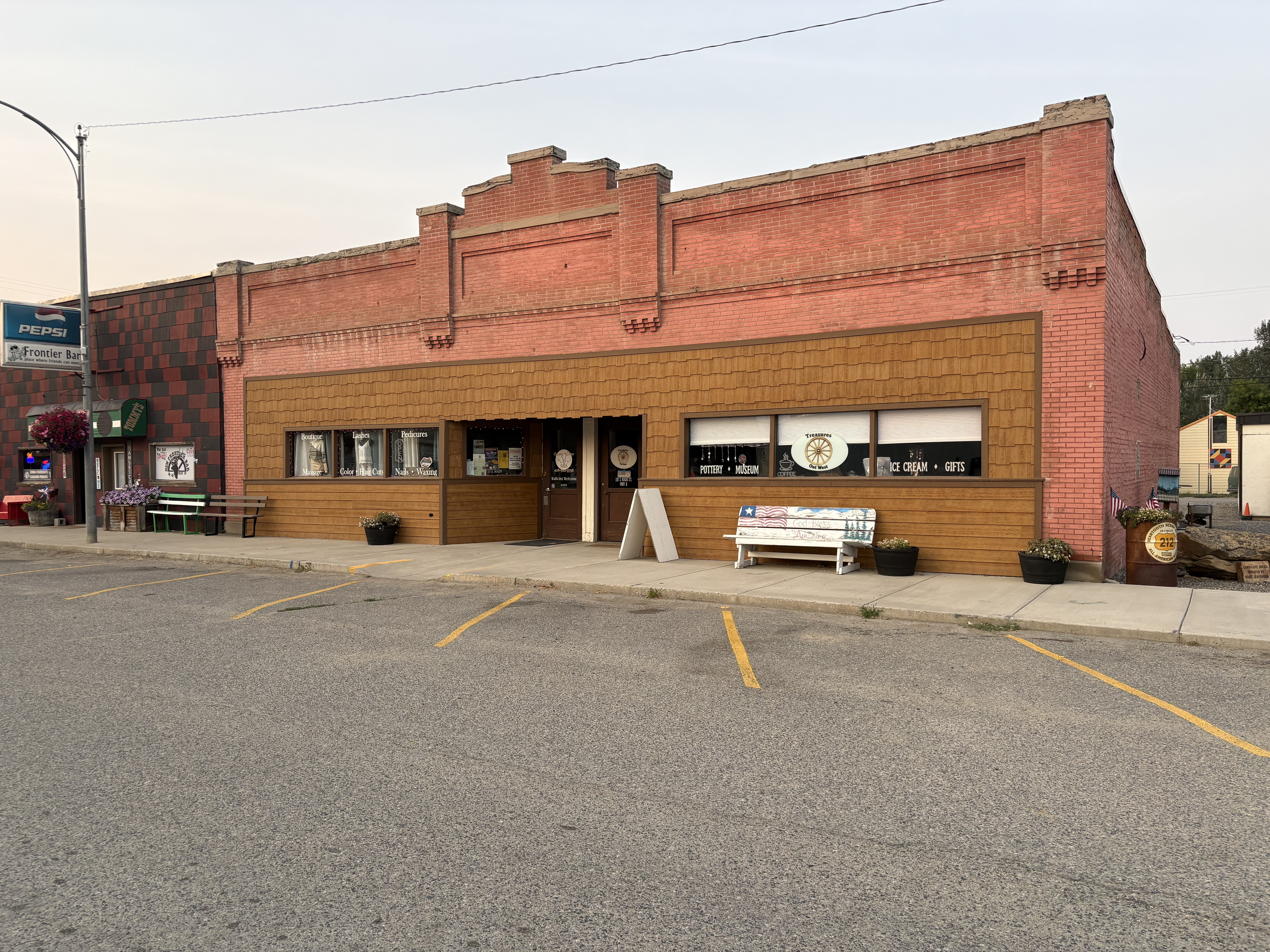
The Baker and Lovering Store in September 2025

It was the first brick building in Joliet and served as the only primary mercantile business in Joliet until 1929. The store was originally owned by G.A. Lovering and C.W. Baker. Baker sold his half of the business to T.W. Smith in 1907.

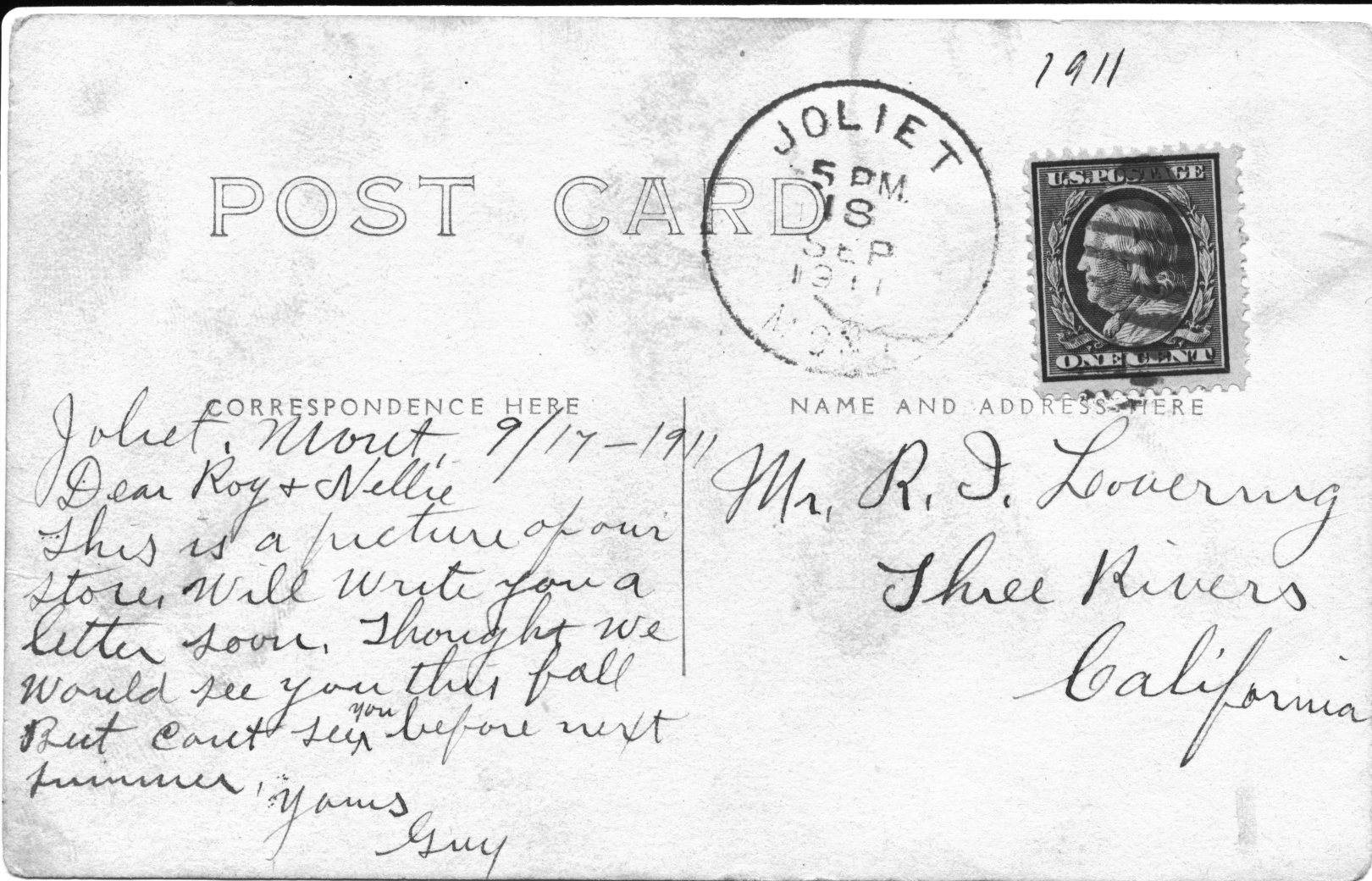
Postcard message referring to the store, 1911, Joliet, Montana

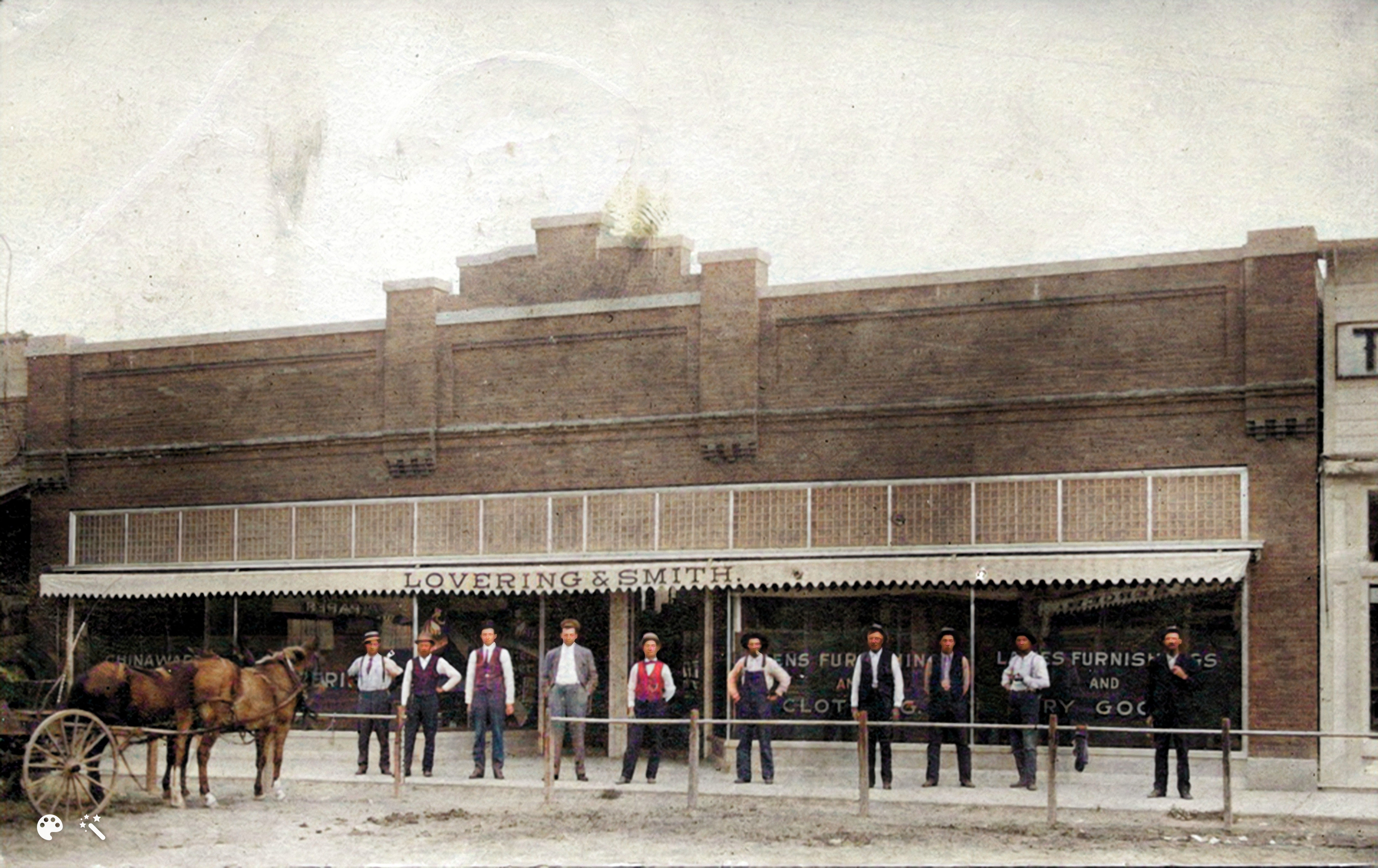
Guy Lovering and T.W. Smith (previously Baker and Lovering) Store, 1911, Joliet, Montana

== Current state ==
The Baker and Lovering Store is now a salon and a pottery museum.
