= Red Lodge Mountain =

Ski area in Montana, United States

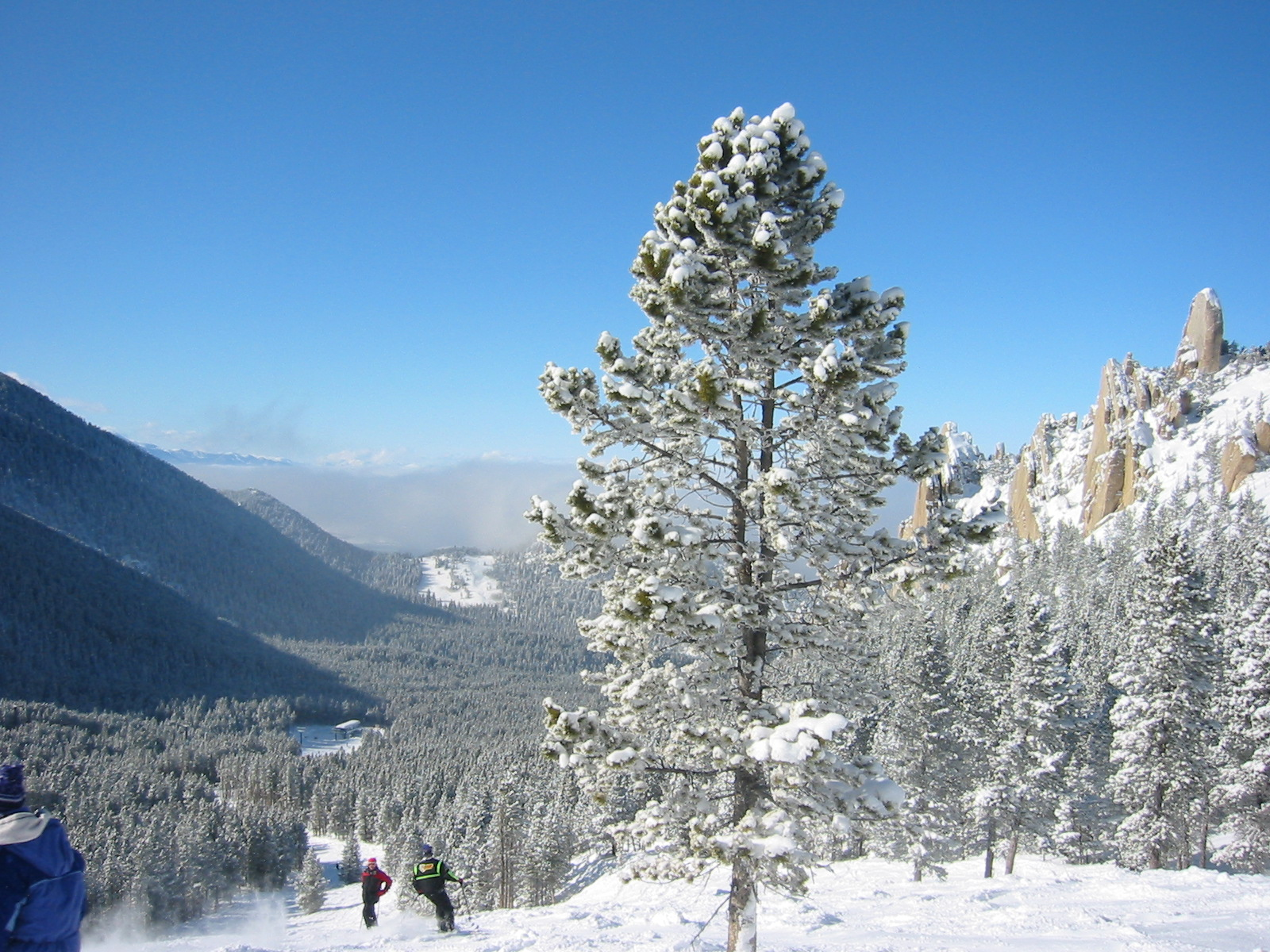
- Palisades area at north end

- Location in Montana Red Lodge Mountain (the United States)
- Location: Carbon County, Montana
- Nearest city: Red Lodge; Billings
- Coordinates: 45.191°N 109.335°W
- Vertical: 2,400 ft (732 m)
- Top elevation: 9,416 ft (2,870 m)
- Base elevation: 7,016 ft (2,138 m)
- Skiable area: 1,600 acres (6.5 km^{2})
- Trails: 65: 17% easiest; 45% more difficult; 38% most difficult
- Longest run: Lazy M - 2.5 miles (4.0 km)
- Lift system: 6 Chairlifts: 2 High-speed Quads; 1 High Speed Triple; 1 Triple; 2 Doubles; 1 Magic Carpet
- Lift capacity: 10,690 per hour
- Terrain parks: 1
- Snowfall: 250 in (640 cm)
- Snowmaking: 31% of runs, full coverage
- Night skiing: none
- Website: redlodgemountain.com

Red Lodge Mountain is an alpine ski area in the western United States, located in south-central Montana along the eastern front of the Beartooth Mountains, west of the town of Red Lodge.

== History of Red Lodge Mountain ==
In the late 1950s, an enthusiastic group of Red Lodge and Billings skiers formed Grizzly Peak, Inc. The group raised $250,000 through stock sales to develop a ski area. Red Lodge Grizzly Peak opened on January 2, 1960, with one double chair, three trails, and a small lodge.

Over the next few years, the ski area continued to expand, adding lifts and more trails. The Grizzly Peak Chair was added in 1971 and the Miami Beach Chair in 1973. The word was spreading throughout the region that Red Lodge Mountain was a fun place to ski and the old mining town of Red Lodge was full of western hospitality and colorful characters.

The ski area continued to grow with the addition in 1983 of the Winter Sports Center and the Triple Chair and the replacement of Midway Lodge in 1986. In the spring of 1994, Red Lodge Mountain purchased the Red Lodge Golf Course and it became the business complement for the ski business. This 18-hole championship golf course and substantial real estate development has offered more and varied work opportunities for seasonal and year-round employees.

In the summer of 1996, the ski area undertook the largest expansion in its history and opened the Cole Creek area which included two high-speed detachable quad chairlifts, 18 new slopes and trails, a complete overhaul of the mountain’s snow-making system and other improvements to the skiing experience. Red Lodge Mountain opened its first snowboard park in 1996. This park attracted so many snowboarders that it was expanded and opened to skiers in 1999.

JMA Ventures, owners of Homewood Mountain Resort, bought Red Lodge Mountain in 2007. Elevation at Red Lodge Mountain is 7,016 ft (2,138 m).
