= Fire Hall (Joliet, Montana) =

- U.S. National Register of Historic Places
- Location within Montana
- Location: Main St., Joliet, Montana
- Coordinates: 45°29′05″N 108°58′10″W
- Area: less than one acre
- Built: 1910
- Built by: Howatt, Jack
- MPS: Joliet Montana MRA
- NRHP reference No.: 86000884
- Added to NRHP: May 2, 1986

The Fire Hall in Joliet, Montana, located on its Main Street and also known as City Hall, was built in 1910. It was listed on the National Register of Historic Places in 1986.

It is a one-story frame structure. It was built behind the Rock Creek State Bank on Carbon Avenue. The building included a space for equipment, a bedroom, and a bell and hose tower.

It was moved to its current location in the 1940s to serve as the Town of Joliet's city hall and was still in use for that purpose in 1985.
