= Joliet, Montana =

Town in Montana, United States

- Town
- Location of Joliet, Montana
- Coordinates: 45°29′04″N 108°58′20″W
- Country: United States
- State: Montana
- County: Carbon

Area
  - Total: 0.27 sq mi (0.71 km^{2})
  - Land: 0.27 sq mi (0.71 km^{2})
  - Water: 0 sq mi (0.00 km^{2})
- Elevation: 3,737 ft (1,139 m)

Population (2020)
  - Total: 577
  - Density: 2,102/sq mi (811.7/km^{2})
- Time zone: UTC-7 (Mountain (MST))
  - Summer (DST): UTC-6 (MDT)
- ZIP code: 59041
- Area code: 406
- FIPS code: 30-39700
- GNIS feature ID: 2412808
- Website: www.townofjolietmt.net

Joliet is a town in Carbon County, Montana, United States. It is part of the Billings, Montana Metropolitan Statistical Area. The population was 577 at the 2020 census.

== History ==
The construction of the Rocky Fork & Cooke City Railway in 1892 made Joliet a shipping point. The Joliet Post Office was established on June 10, 1893, with Maud Smith as its first postmaster. The town was named for Joliet, Illinois.

The Fire Hall is listed on the NRHP.

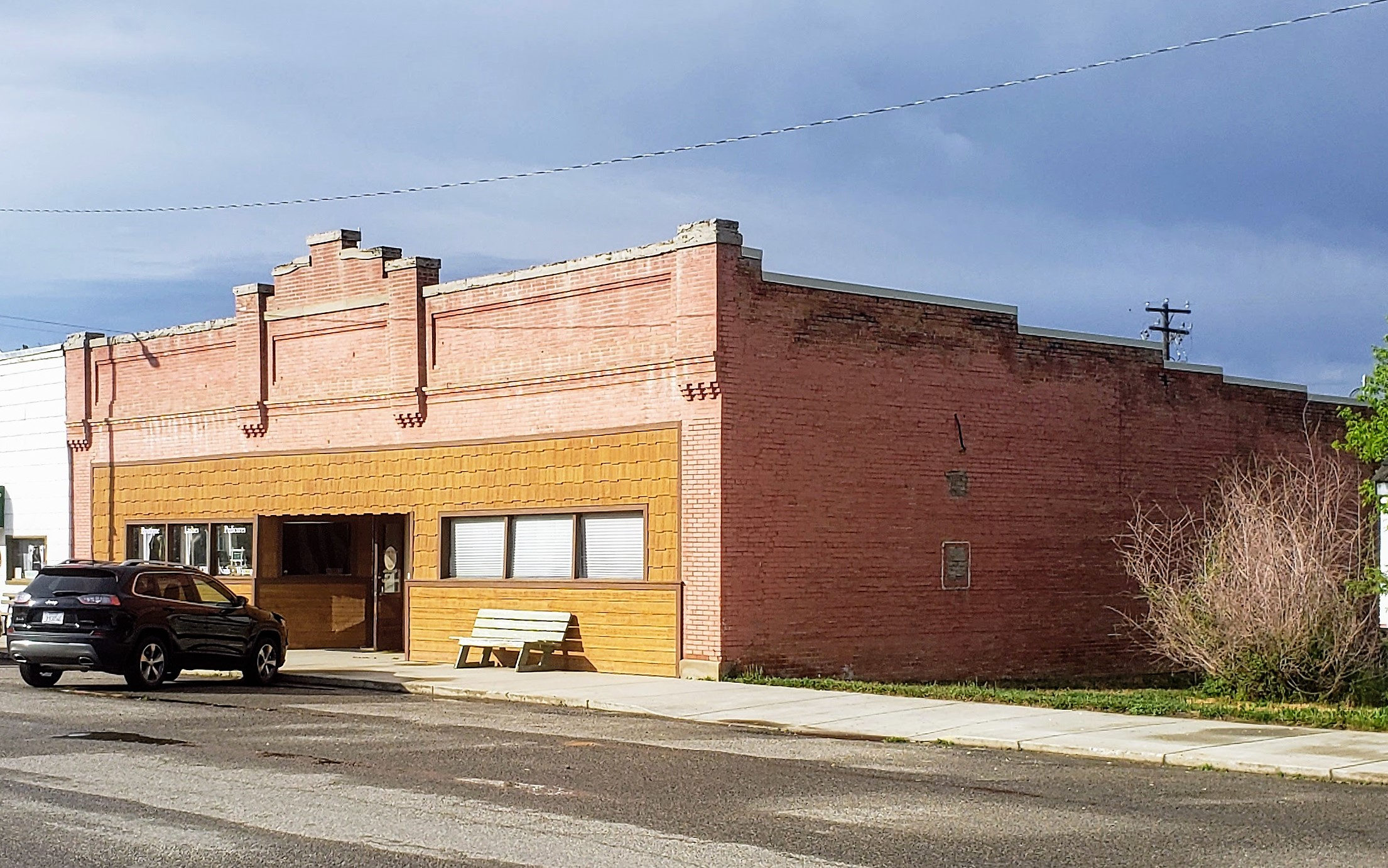
The Baker and Lovering Store on Main St.

== Geography ==
Rock Creek flows south of town. The Beartooth Mountains are to the west.

According to the United States Census Bureau, the town has a total area of 0.30 square miles (0.78 km^{2}), all land.

== Climate ==
According to the Köppen Climate Classification system, Joliet has a warm-summer humid continental climate, abbreviated "Dfb" on climate maps.

Climate data for Joliet, Montana, 1991–2020 normals, extremes 1956–present
Month	Jan	Feb	Mar	Apr	May	Jun	Jul	Aug	Sep	Oct	Nov	Dec	Year
Record high °F (°C)	63 (17)	73 (23)	78 (26)	87 (31)	94 (34)	102 (39)	106 (41)	104 (40)	101 (38)	91 (33)	75 (24)	69 (21)	106 (41)
Mean maximum °F (°C)	54.9 (12.7)	58.6 (14.8)	69.5 (20.8)	78.8 (26.0)	85.1 (29.5)	93.3 (34.1)	98.5 (36.9)	97.4 (36.3)	92.8 (33.8)	81.0 (27.2)	66.3 (19.1)	55.1 (12.8)	99.7 (37.6)
Mean daily maximum °F (°C)	35.9 (2.2)	38.6 (3.7)	49.0 (9.4)	56.5 (13.6)	65.7 (18.7)	75.8 (24.3)	85.7 (29.8)	84.3 (29.1)	73.7 (23.2)	58.8 (14.9)	45.3 (7.4)	35.8 (2.1)	58.8 (14.9)
Daily mean °F (°C)	22.9 (−5.1)	25.3 (−3.7)	34.1 (1.2)	41.5 (5.3)	51.0 (10.6)	60.1 (15.6)	67.8 (19.9)	66.1 (18.9)	56.5 (13.6)	43.7 (6.5)	32.1 (0.1)	23.4 (−4.8)	43.7 (6.5)
Mean daily minimum °F (°C)	9.8 (−12.3)	12.0 (−11.1)	19.1 (−7.2)	26.6 (−3.0)	36.3 (2.4)	44.3 (6.8)	49.9 (9.9)	47.9 (8.8)	39.3 (4.1)	28.6 (−1.9)	18.9 (−7.3)	11.1 (−11.6)	28.7 (−1.9)
Mean minimum °F (°C)	−13.7 (−25.4)	−7.6 (−22.0)	0.5 (−17.5)	14.7 (−9.6)	25.7 (−3.5)	34.4 (1.3)	42.8 (6.0)	39.3 (4.1)	29.5 (−1.4)	14.1 (−9.9)	−1.4 (−18.6)	−8.6 (−22.6)	−21.3 (−29.6)
Record low °F (°C)	−37 (−38)	−35 (−37)	−32 (−36)	−10 (−23)	15 (−9)	27 (−3)	32 (0)	29 (−2)	18 (−8)	−10 (−23)	−28 (−33)	−39 (−39)	−39 (−39)
Average precipitation inches (mm)	0.53 (13)	0.57 (14)	0.84 (21)	1.89 (48)	2.67 (68)	2.11 (54)	0.94 (24)	0.88 (22)	1.26 (32)	1.57 (40)	0.70 (18)	0.58 (15)	14.54 (369)
Average snowfall inches (cm)	7.7 (20)	9.5 (24)	8.0 (20)	4.1 (10)	0.8 (2.0)	0.0 (0.0)	0.0 (0.0)	0.0 (0.0)	0.4 (1.0)	4.8 (12)	6.5 (17)	9.1 (23)	50.9 (129)
Average precipitation days (≥ 0.01 in)	4.7	4.8	6.2	8.7	11.0	9.6	6.7	5.6	6.4	7.1	4.9	5.1	80.8
Average snowy days (≥ 0.1 in)	4.2	5.3	3.9	2.4	0.3	0.0	0.0	0.0	0.1	1.9	2.8	5.1	26.0
Source 1: NOAA
Source 2: National Weather Service

== Demographics ==
Historical population
Census	Pop.	Note	%±
1910	389		—
1920	440		13.1%
1930	359		−18.4%
1940	476		32.6%
1950	410		−13.9%
1960	452		10.2%
1970	412		−8.8%
1980	580		40.8%
1990	522		−10.0%
2000	575		10.2%
2010	595		3.5%
2020	577		−3.0%
U.S. Decennial Census

=== 2010 census ===
As of the census of 2010, there were 595 people, 260 households, and 165 families residing in the town. The population density was 178.3 inhabitants per square mile (68.8/km^{2}). There were 285 housing units at an average density of 950.0 per square mile (366.8/km^{2}). The racial makeup of the town was 97.3% White, 0.3% African American, 0.8% Native American, 0.2% Asian, 0.7% from other races, and 0.7% from two or more races. Hispanic or Latino people of any race were 1.8% of the population.

There were 260 households, of which 28.8% had children under the age of 18 living with them, 48.1% were married couples living together, 11.9% had a female householder with no husband present, 3.5% had a male householder with no wife present, and 36.5% were non-families. 32.3% of all households were made up of individuals, and 19.2% had someone living alone who was 65 years of age or older. The average household size was 2.29 and the average family size was 2.91.

The median age in the town was 41.1 years. 24.9% of residents were under the age of 18; 5.9% were between the ages of 18 and 24; 22.7% were from 25 to 44; 27% were from 45 to 64; and 19.7% were 65 years of age or older. The gender makeup of the town was 50.4% male and 49.6% female.

== Education ==
Joliet Public Schools educates students from kindergarten through 12th grade. The Joliet Elementary School District, which includes kindergarten to 8th grade, had 274 students enrolled in the 2021-2022 school year.

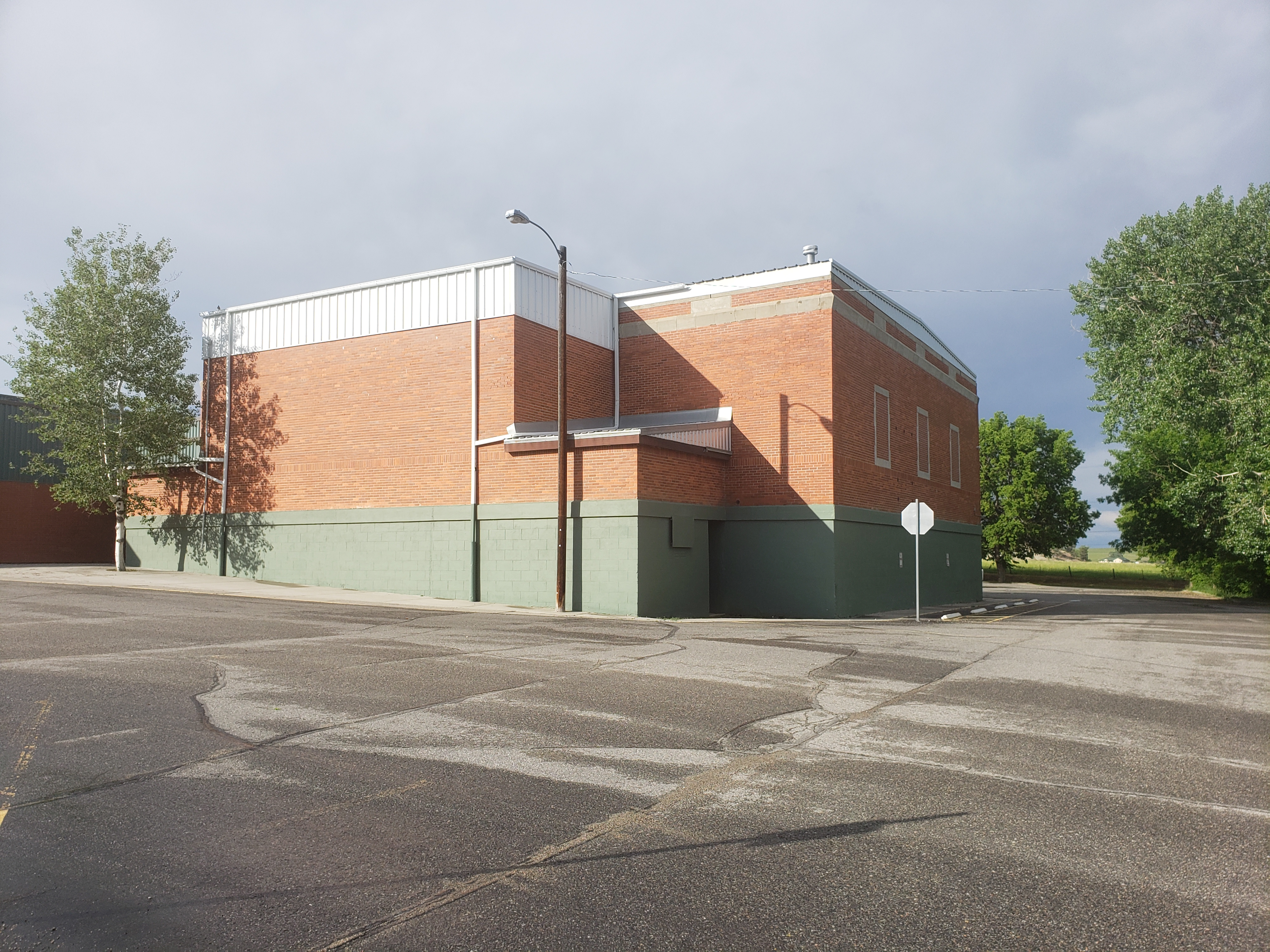
The older gym at the high school

Joliet High School had 129 students enrolled in the 2021-2022 school year. It is a Class B school, a Montana High School Association designation which helps determine athletic competitions. Their team name is the J-Hawks.

Joliet Public Library serves the area.

== Media ==
The FM radion station KWMY is licensed in Joliet.

== Infrastructure ==
U.S. Route 212 travels east to west through town. The secondary highway 421 is west of town.

== Notable people ==
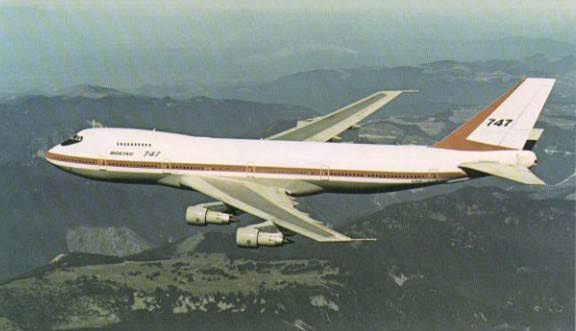
The first Boeing 747 (N7470), also known as the City of Everett, the plane Jack Waddell piloted.

- Jack Waddell, test pilot on the maiden flight of the Boeing 747
