= Roscoe, Montana =

Unincorporated community in Montana, United States

- Census-designated place
- Location within Montana Location within the United States
- Coordinates: 45°21′07″N 109°29′36″W
- Country: United States
- State: Montana
- County: Carbon

Area
  - Total: 0.23 sq mi (0.59 km^{2})
  - Land: 0.23 sq mi (0.59 km^{2})
  - Water: 0 sq mi (0.00 km^{2})
- Elevation: 4,987 ft (1,520 m)

Population (2020)
  - Total: 16
  - Density: 70.2/sq mi (27.11/km^{2})
- Time zone: UTC-7 (Mountain (MST))
  - Summer (DST): UTC-6 (MDT)
- ZIP code: 59001
- Area code: 406
- GNIS feature ID: 2583839

Roscoe is a census-designated place and unincorporated community in Carbon County, Montana, United States. As of the 2020 census, Roscoe had a population of 16.

Situated on Montana Highway 78, Roscoe is 20 miles from Red Lodge and 13 miles from Absarokee.

== History ==
Roscoe was originally called Morris. Its post office was established on July 6, 1901, with Timothy F. George at its first postmaster. The post office officially changed the name from Morris to Roscoe on February 14, 1905. This was to alleviate confusion with mail going to Norris, Montana.

== Demographics ==
Historical population
Census	Pop.	Note	%±
2020	16		—
U.S. Decennial Census
