= Carbon County, Montana =

County in Montana, United States

- County
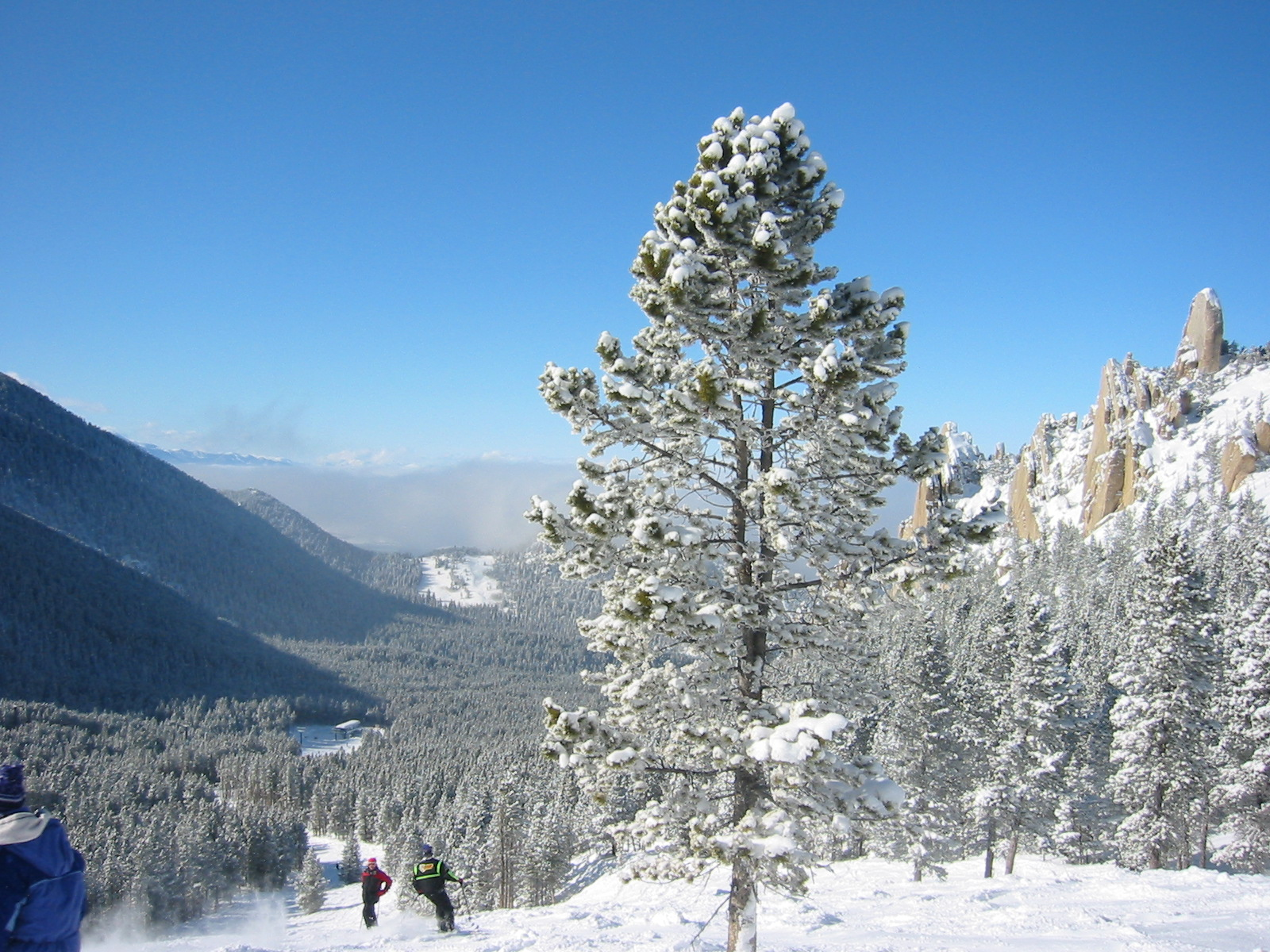
- Palisades

- Location within the U.S. state of Montana
- Coordinates: 45°14′N 109°01′W
- Country: United States
- State: Montana
- Founded: March 4, 1895
- Seat: Red Lodge
- Largest city: Red Lodge

Area
  - Total: 2,062 sq mi (5,340 km^{2})
  - Land: 2,049 sq mi (5,310 km^{2})
  - Water: 13 sq mi (34 km^{2}) 0.6%

Population (2020)
  - Total: 10,473
  - Estimate (2025): 11,466 ▲
  - Density: 5.111/sq mi (1.973/km^{2})
- Time zone: UTC−7 (Mountain)
  - Summer (DST): UTC−6 (MDT)
- Congressional district: 2nd
- Website: carbonmt.gov
- Montana county number 10

Carbon County is a county located in the U.S. state of Montana. As of the 2020 census, the population was 10,473. Its county seat is Red Lodge.

Carbon County is part of the Billings, MT Metropolitan Statistical Area.

== History ==
Carbon County was named for the rich coal deposits found in the area. It was organized on March 4, 1895, from portions of Park and Yellowstone counties.

Land from Park and Yellowstone counties was used to form Carbon County on March 4, 1895. More than sixty federally designated historic sites are located in the county, including Petroglyph Canyon, one of the state's most important rock art sites.

The first commercial oil well in the state was established in Elk Basin fields in 1915.

== Geography ==
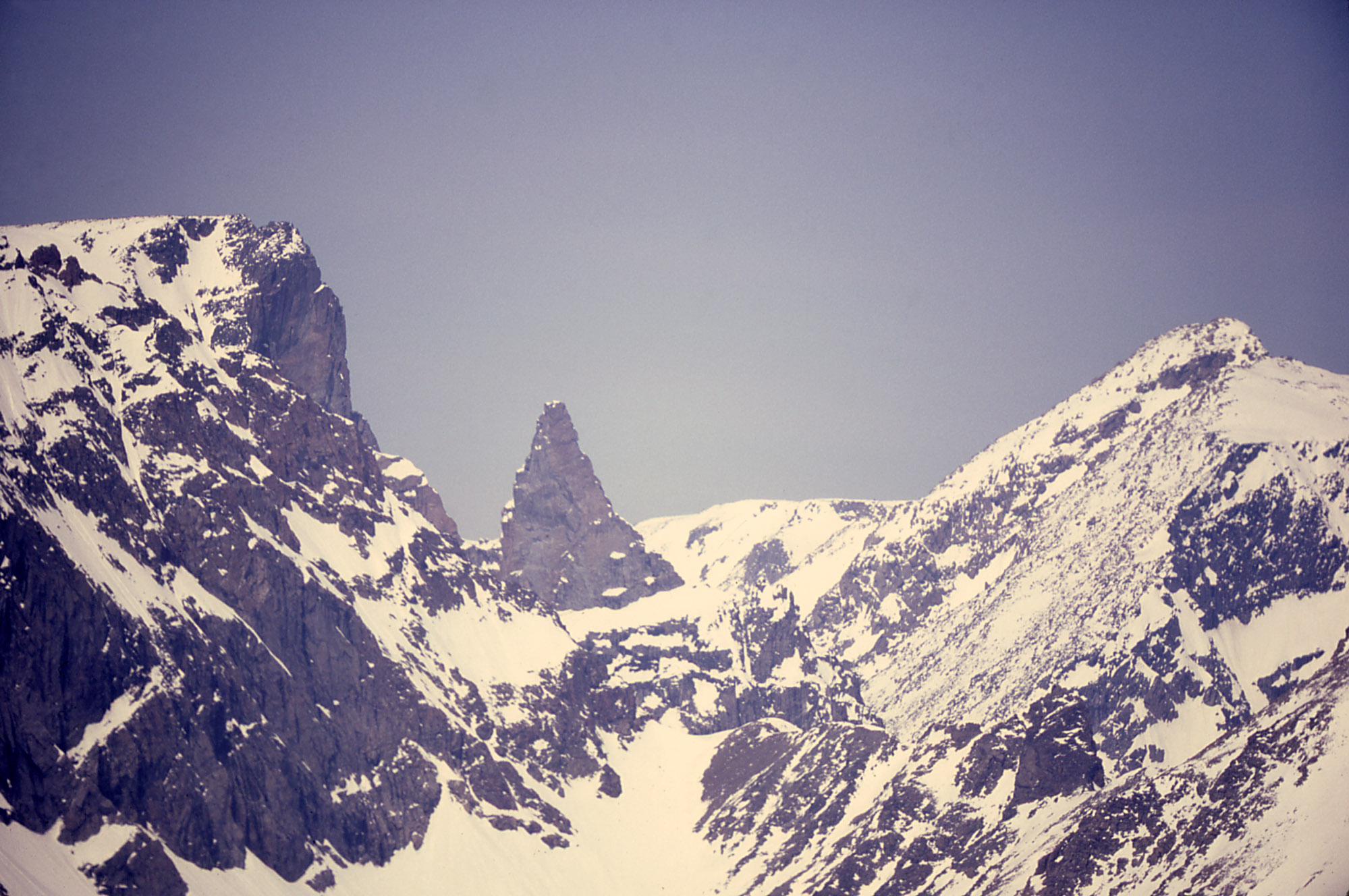
Bear's Tooth

According to the United States Census Bureau, the county has a total area of 2,062 square miles (5,340 km^{2}), of which 2,049 square miles (5,310 km^{2}) is land and 13 square miles (34 km^{2}) (0.6%) is water.

Granite Peak, the state's highest mountain, is found in Carbon County's Beartooth Mountains. The Beartooth Highway, one of the "most spectacular alpine highways", links Red Lodge to Cooke City. The Pryor Mountains are in the east of the county, along with the Big Horn River.

=== Major highways ===
- U.S. Highway 212
- U.S. Highway 310
- Montana Highway 72
- Montana Highway 78

=== Adjacent counties ===
- Park County - west
- Stillwater County - north
- Yellowstone County - northeast
- Big Horn County - east
- Big Horn County, Wyoming - southeast
- Park County, Wyoming - south

=== National protected areas ===
- Bighorn Canyon National Recreation Area (part)
- Custer National Forest (part)
- Gallatin National Forest (part)

== Politics ==
Carbon County has voted Republican in every presidential election since 1968.

United States presidential election results for Carbon County, Montana
Year	Republican		Democratic		Third party(ies)	
Year	No.	%	No.	%	No.	%
1904	1,130	59.07%	464	24.26%	319	16.68%
1908	1,205	52.01%	844	36.43%	268	11.57%
1912	646	24.88%	796	30.66%	1,154	44.45%
1916	1,708	42.56%	1,926	47.99%	379	9.44%
1920	2,700	64.07%	1,107	26.27%	407	9.66%
1924	1,891	44.33%	698	16.36%	1,677	39.31%
1928	2,514	58.10%	1,674	38.69%	139	3.21%
1932	1,942	38.26%	2,872	56.58%	262	5.16%
1936	1,617	33.16%	3,116	63.90%	143	2.93%
1940	2,421	46.91%	2,678	51.89%	62	1.20%
1944	2,126	50.26%	2,073	49.01%	31	0.73%
1948	1,901	45.60%	1,997	47.90%	271	6.50%
1952	2,734	61.16%	1,713	38.32%	23	0.51%
1956	2,345	56.30%	1,820	43.70%	0	0.00%
1960	2,050	51.75%	1,903	48.04%	8	0.20%
1964	1,535	42.25%	2,098	57.75%	0	0.00%
1968	1,972	54.98%	1,353	37.72%	262	7.30%
1972	2,378	61.91%	1,292	33.64%	171	4.45%
1976	2,121	52.44%	1,853	45.81%	71	1.76%
1980	2,471	56.64%	1,468	33.65%	424	9.72%
1984	2,877	62.72%	1,657	36.12%	53	1.16%
1988	2,360	52.80%	2,039	45.62%	71	1.59%
1992	1,562	33.81%	1,549	33.53%	1,509	32.66%
1996	2,147	45.09%	1,854	38.93%	761	15.98%
2000	3,008	62.81%	1,434	29.94%	347	7.25%
2004	3,342	62.81%	1,847	34.71%	132	2.48%
2008	3,108	54.05%	2,443	42.49%	199	3.46%
2012	3,533	60.42%	2,146	36.70%	168	2.87%
2016	3,748	62.56%	1,828	30.51%	415	6.93%
2020	4,468	63.35%	2,421	34.33%	164	2.33%
2024	4,719	64.67%	2,353	32.25%	225	3.08%

== Demographics ==
Historical population
Census	Pop.	Note	%±
1900	7,533		—
1910	13,962		85.3%
1920	15,279		9.4%
1930	12,571		−17.7%
1940	11,865		−5.6%
1950	10,241		−13.7%
1960	8,317		−18.8%
1970	7,080		−14.9%
1980	8,099		14.4%
1990	8,080		−0.2%
2000	9,552		18.2%
2010	10,078		5.5%
2020	10,473		3.9%
2025 (est.)	11,466	▲	9.5%
U.S. Decennial Census; 1790–1960, 1900–1990, 1990–2000, 2010–2020, 2023

=== 2020 census ===
As of the 2020 census, the county had a population of 10,473, with 18.8% of residents under the age of 18 and 25.6% aged 65 or older; the median age was 50.0 years. For every 100 females there were 102.1 males, and for every 100 females age 18 and over there were 103.0 males. None of the residents lived in urban areas and 100.0% lived in rural areas.

The racial makeup of the county was 92.8% White, 0.2% Black or African American, 1.1% American Indian and Alaska Native, 0.2% Asian, 0.7% from some other race, and 5.0% from two or more races; Hispanic or Latino residents of any race comprised 2.5% of the population.

There were 4,694 households, of which 21.7% had children under the age of 18 living with them and 20.9% had a female householder with no spouse or partner present. About 31.5% of all households were made up of individuals and 14.8% had someone living alone who was 65 years of age or older.

There were 6,359 housing units, of which 26.2% were vacant. Among occupied housing units, 77.1% were owner-occupied and 22.9% were renter-occupied. The homeowner vacancy rate was 1.7% and the rental vacancy rate was 11.7%.

=== 2010 census ===
As of the 2010 census, there were 10,078 people, 4,571 households, and 2,884 families living in the county. The population density was 4.9 inhabitants per square mile (1.9/km^{2}). There were 6,441 housing units at an average density of 3.1 units per square mile (1.2 units/km^{2}). The racial makeup of the county was 97.2% white, 0.8% American Indian, 0.3% black or African American, 0.2% Asian, 0.4% from other races, and 1.0% from two or more races. Those of Hispanic or Latino origin made up 1.9% of the population. In terms of ancestry, 32.3% were German, 16.2% were Irish, 14.5% were English, 12.6% were American, and 6.6% were Norwegian.

Of the 4,571 households, 23.6% had children under the age of 18 living with them, 53.4% were married couples living together, 6.1% had a female householder with no husband present, 36.9% were non-families, and 31.2% of all households were made up of individuals. The average household size was 2.19 and the average family size was 2.74. The median age was 48.1 years.

The median income for a household in the county was $49,010 and the median income for a family was $59,823. Males had a median income of $41,241 versus $26,150 for females. The per capita income for the county was $24,983. About 8.1% of families and 12.2% of the population were below the poverty line, including 14.1% of those under age 18 and 11.1% of those age 65 or over.

== Economy ==
During the early history of Carbon County, coal mining was the predominant industry. The current economy relies on agriculture, recreation, and tourism.

In 2009 the top employers were Beartooth Hospital & Health Center, Red Lodge Mountain, and the Red Lodge Pizza Company.

In December 2014, construction began on a large windfarm, Mud Springs Wind Ranch, with 120 wind turbines, 12 miles (19 km) southeast of Bridger.

== Communities ==
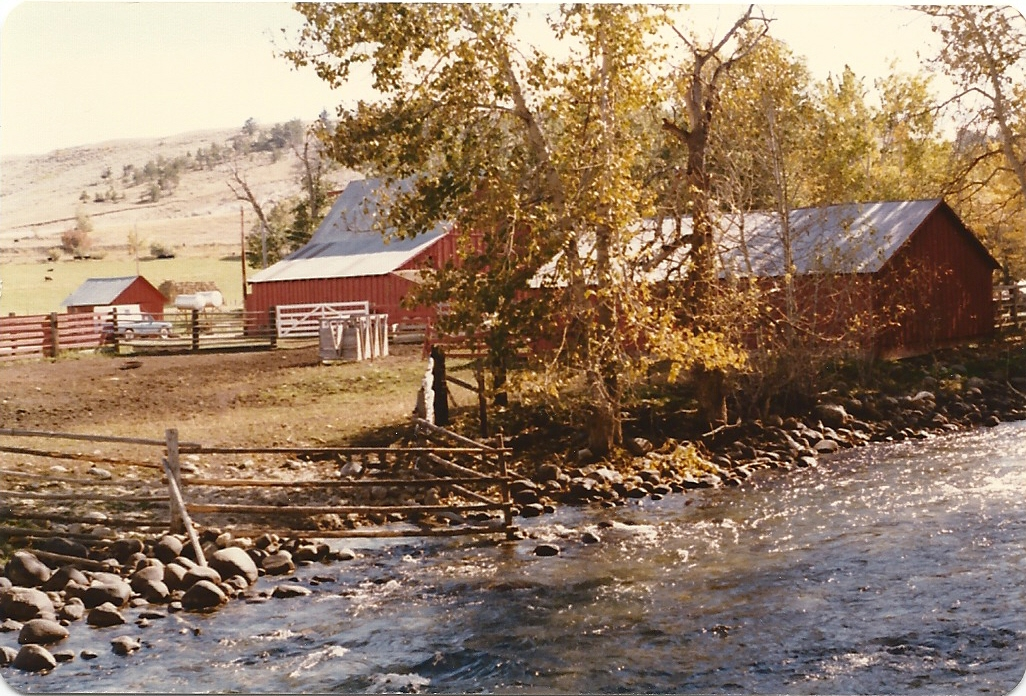
Farm along a creek in Roscoe, September 1978

=== City ===
- Red Lodge (county seat)

=== Towns ===
- Bearcreek
- Bridger
- Fromberg
- Joliet

=== Census-designated places ===
- Belfry
- Boyd
- Edgar
- Fox
- Luther (originally Linley)
- Montaqua
- Roberts
- Rockvale
- Roscoe (originally Morris)
- Silesia

=== Unincorporated communities ===
- Alpine
- Bowler
- George Place
- Peterson Place
- Richel Lodge
- Selmes
- Warren
- Washoe

=== Former communities ===
- Carbonado
- Chance
- Chickentown
- Fairbanks
- Gebo (originally Coalville)
- Golden
- International
- New Caledonia
- Riverview
- Scotch Coulee
- Stringtown

== See also ==
- List of lakes in Carbon County, Montana
- List of mountains in Carbon County, Montana
- National Register of Historic Places listings in Carbon County, Montana
