= Roberts, Montana =

Unincorporated town in Montana, United States

- Census-designated place
- Location within Montana Location within the United States
- Coordinates: 45°20′37″N 109°10′54″W
- Country: United States
- State: Montana
- County: Carbon

Area
  - Total: 3.98 sq mi (10.31 km^{2})
  - Land: 3.98 sq mi (10.31 km^{2})
  - Water: 0 sq mi (0.00 km^{2})
- Elevation: 4,666 ft (1,422 m)

Population (2020)
  - Total: 304
  - Density: 76.4/sq mi (29.49/km^{2})
- Time zone: UTC-7 (Mountain (MST))
  - Summer (DST): UTC-6 (MDT)
- ZIP code: 59070
- Area code: 406
- GNIS feature ID: 2583838

Roberts is a census-designated place and unincorporated town in Carbon County, Montana, United States. The population was 304 in the 2020 census compared to 361 in 2010.

Initially part of the Crow Indian Reservation, the location was part of lands ceded in 1892. Originally named Merritt, Roberts began as a Northern Pacific Railroad siding in 1893. The town was platted in 1902 and the name changed the same year. The name comes either from a surveyor of the railroad or the railroad manager between Billings and Red Lodge.

The nearby Kero Farmstead is listed in the National Register of Historic Places. Jacob Kero placed a homestead claim on the land in 1905. The Finnish style farmstead contains fourteen buildings and structures dating from around 1907 to 1958.

Situated on U.S. Route 212, Roberts is about 12 miles from Red Lodge. Rock Creek flows south of town. A former settlement named Roberts was located at 45°21′28″N 109°10′08″W.

== Demographics ==
Historical population
Census	Pop.	Note	%±
2020	304		—
U.S. Decennial Census

== Climate ==
The Köppen Climate Classification subtype for this climate is "Dfb" (Warm Summer Continental Climate).

== Education ==
It is home to the Roberts School District which educates students from kindergarten to 12th grade. The district had 97 total students in the 2024-2025 school year. Roberts High School is a Class C school (less than 108 students) which helps determine athletic competitions. They are known as the Rockets.
