= Rockvale, Montana =

Unincorporated community in Montana, United States

- Unincorporated community
- Location within Montana Location within the United States
- Coordinates: 45°31′04″N 108°52′32″W
- Country: United States
- State: Montana
- County: Carbon

Area
  - Total: 1.66 sq mi (4.30 km^{2})
  - Land: 1.66 sq mi (4.30 km^{2})
  - Water: 0 sq mi (0.00 km^{2})
- Elevation: 3,504 ft (1,068 m)

Population (2020)
  - Total: 193
  - Density: 116.3/sq mi (44.92/km^{2})
- Time zone: UTC-7 (Mountain (MST))
  - Summer (DST): UTC-6 (MDT)
- ZIP code: 59041
- Area code: 406
- GNIS feature ID: 2804699

Rockvale is an unincorporated community in Carbon County, Montana, United States. As of the 2020 census, Rockvale had a population of 193. As of 2024, it is the site of a bar, a casino, and some homes. Little remains of the original town site except a nearby cemetery.

It lies at the intersection of U.S. Route 212 and Montana Secondary Highway 310. Rock Creek runs south of town.

Rockvale is home to many different businesses, such as a restaurant and lounge, a drive in restaurant and U haul dealer.

== History ==
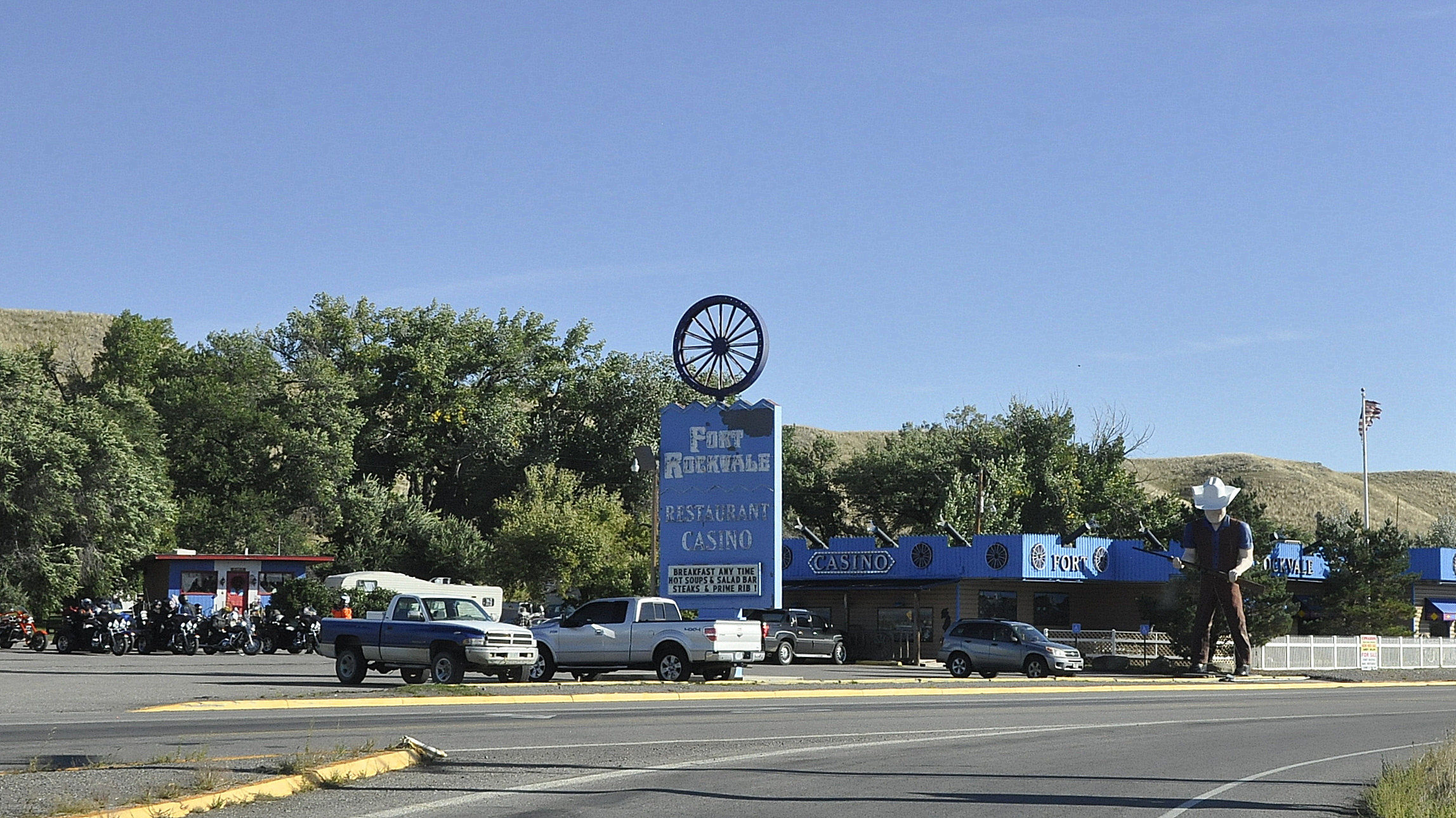
Rockvale

Rockvale post office was established on May 12, 1894, with Orren Clawson as its first postmaster. The post office closed on April 30, 1914.

== Demographics ==
Historical population
Census	Pop.	Note	%±
2020	193		—
U.S. Decennial Census
